= Mesosini =

- Coptops aedificator (Fabricius, 1792)

Scientific classification
- Kingdom: Animalia
- Phylum: Arthropoda
- Class: Insecta
- Order: Coleoptera
- Suborder: Polyphaga
- Infraorder: Cucujiformia
- Family: Cerambycidae
- Subfamily: Lamiinae
- Tribe: Mesosini; Mulsant, 1839

Tribe of beetles

Mesosini is a tribe of longhorn beetles of the subfamily Lamiinae.

== Taxonomy ==
- Aemocia
- Aesopida
- Agelasta
- Anagelasta
- Anancylus
- Anipocregyes
- Cacia
- Caciella
- Choeromorpha
- Clyzomedus
- Coptops
- Cristipocregyes
- Demodes
- Elelea
- Epimesosa
- Ereis
- Eurymesosa
- Falsocacia
- Falsomesosella
- Golsinda
- Hypocacia
- Leptomesosa
- Liosynaphaeta
- Mesocacia
- Mesoereis
- Mesoplanodes
- Mesosa
- Mesosaimia
- Metacoptops
- Metipocregyes
- Microcacia
- Mimagelasta
- Mimanancylus
- Mimocacia
- Mimosaimia
- Mnemea
- Mutatocoptops
- Pachyosa
- Paracaciella
- Paracoptops
- Paraereis
- Paragolsinda
- Paraplanodes
- Paripocregyes
- Planodes
- Plesiomesosites †
- Pseudipocregyes
- Pseudochoeromorpha
- Pseudoclyzomedus
- Pseudocoptops
- Pseudoplanodes
- Pseudozelota
- Silgonda
- Sorbia
- Spinipocregyes
- Stenomesosa
- Synaphaeta
- Syrrhopeus
- Therippia
- Trichomesosa
- Zelota
