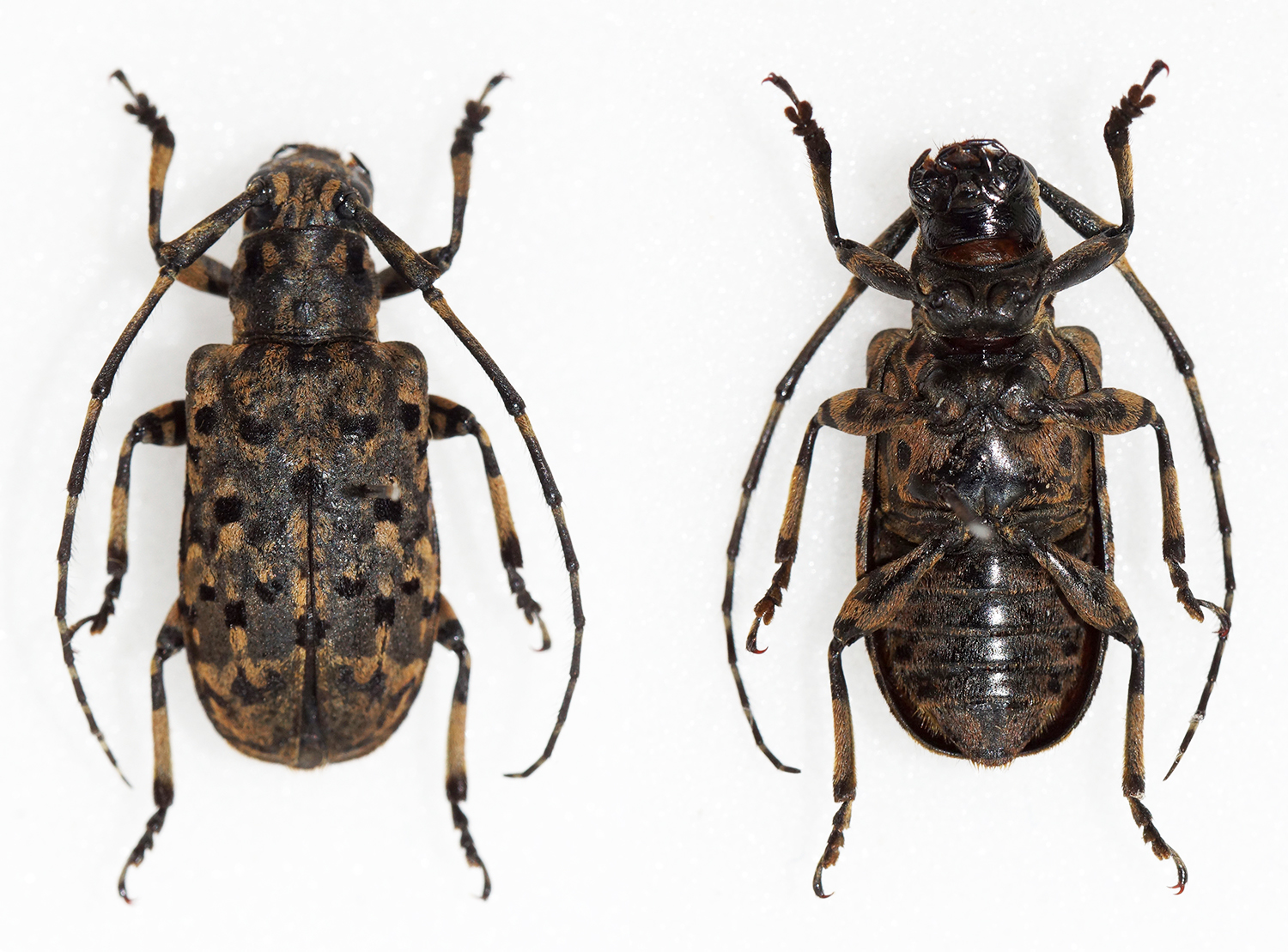
- Mesocacia multimaculata

Scientific classification
- Kingdom: Animalia
- Phylum: Arthropoda
- Class: Insecta
- Order: Coleoptera
- Suborder: Polyphaga
- Infraorder: Cucujiformia
- Family: Cerambycidae
- Subfamily: Lamiinae
- Tribe: Mesosini
- Genus: Mesocacia; Heller, 1926

= Mesocacia =

Genus of beetles

Mesocacia is a genus of longhorn beetles of the subfamily Lamiinae, containing the following species:

- Mesocacia elongata Breuning, 1936
- Mesocacia multimaculata (Pic, 1925)
- Mesocacia pulla Zhang, 1989 †
- Mesocacia punctifasciata Gressitt, 1940
- Mesocacia rugicollis Gressitt, 1940
