= Sorbia sericans =

Scientific classification
- Kingdom: Animalia
- Phylum: Arthropoda
- Class: Insecta
- Order: Coleoptera
- Suborder: Polyphaga
- Infraorder: Cucujiformia
- Family: Cerambycidae
- Subfamily: Lamiinae
- Tribe: Mesosini
- Genus: Sorbia
- Species: S. sericans

Binomial name
- Sorbia sericans Breuning, 1948

Species of beetle

Sorbia sericans is a species of beetle in the family Cerambycidae, found in Cambodia. It was described by Stephan von Breuning in 1948.
