= Clyzomedus annularis =

Scientific classification
- Domain: Eukaryota
- Kingdom: Animalia
- Phylum: Arthropoda
- Class: Insecta
- Order: Coleoptera
- Suborder: Polyphaga
- Infraorder: Cucujiformia
- Family: Cerambycidae
- Subfamily: Lamiinae
- Tribe: Mesosini
- Genus: Clyzomedus
- Species: C. annularis

Binomial name
- Clyzomedus annularis Pascoe, 1866

Species of beetle

Clyzomedus annularis is a species of beetle in the family Cerambycidae. It was described by Francis Polkinghorne Pascoe in 1866. It is known from Cambodia, the Andaman Islands, Malaysia, Laos, and the Nicobar Islands.
