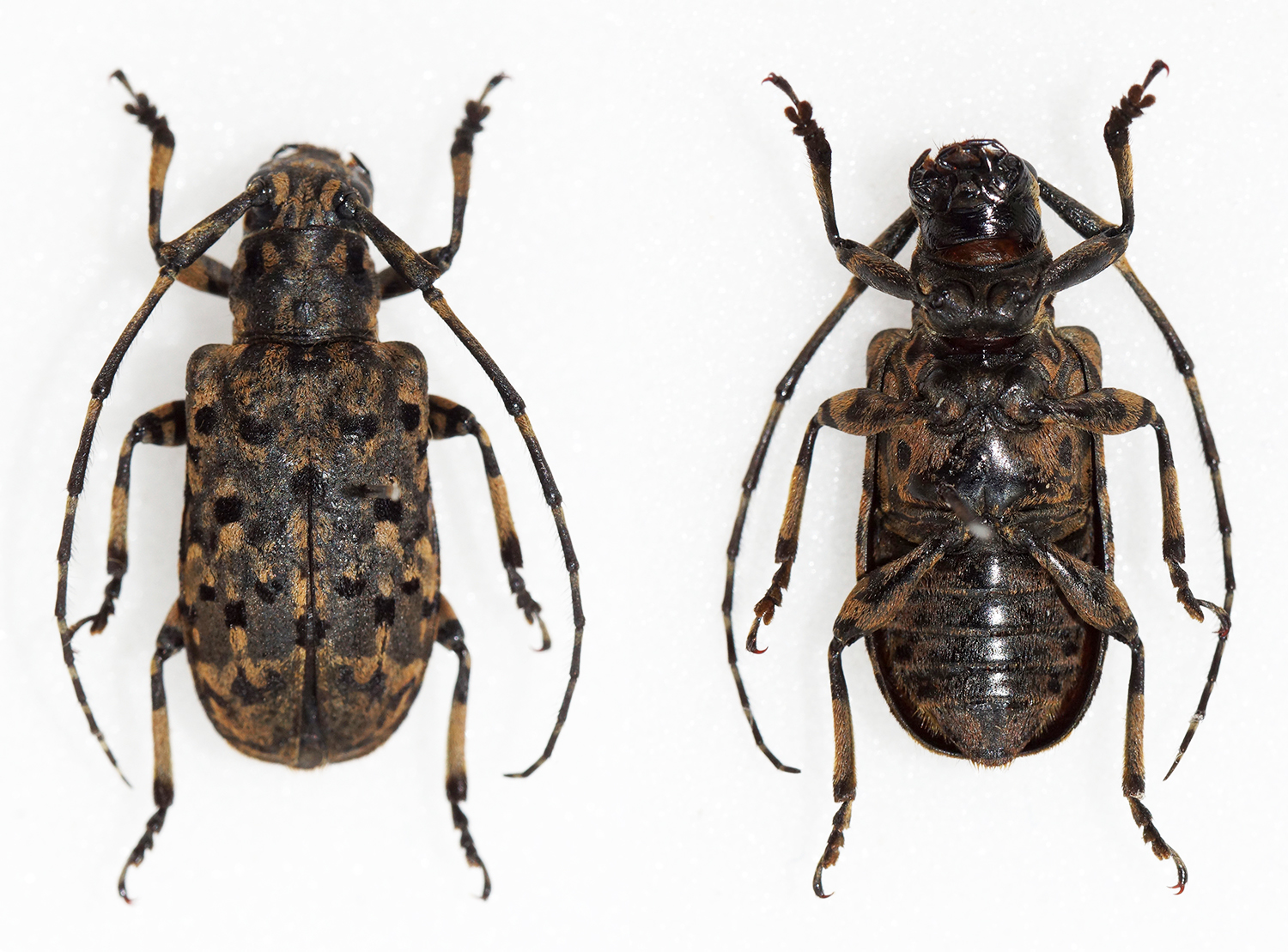

Scientific classification
- Kingdom: Animalia
- Phylum: Arthropoda
- Class: Insecta
- Order: Coleoptera
- Suborder: Polyphaga
- Infraorder: Cucujiformia
- Family: Cerambycidae
- Genus: Mesocacia
- Species: M. multimaculata

Binomial name
- Mesocacia multimaculata (Pic, 1925)

Synonyms
- Ereis multimaculata Pic, 1925; Mesocacia assamensis Heller, 1926

= Mesocacia multimaculata =

Species of beetle

Mesocacia multimaculata is a species of beetle in the family Cerambycidae. It was described by Maurice Pic in 1925, originally under the genus Ereis. It is known from India, China, Thailand, Laos, and Vietnam.
