= Clyzomedus borneensis =

Scientific classification
- Kingdom: Animalia
- Phylum: Arthropoda
- Class: Insecta
- Order: Coleoptera
- Suborder: Polyphaga
- Infraorder: Cucujiformia
- Family: Cerambycidae
- Subfamily: Lamiinae
- Tribe: Mesosini
- Genus: Clyzomedus
- Species: C. borneensis

Binomial name
- Clyzomedus borneensis Breuning, 1936

Species of beetle

Clyzomedus borneensis is a species of beetle in the family Cerambycidae. It was described by Stephan von Breuning in 1936. It is known from Borneo and Malaysia.
