= Clyzomedus fastidiosus =

Scientific classification
- Domain: Eukaryota
- Kingdom: Animalia
- Phylum: Arthropoda
- Class: Insecta
- Order: Coleoptera
- Suborder: Polyphaga
- Infraorder: Cucujiformia
- Family: Cerambycidae
- Subfamily: Lamiinae
- Tribe: Mesosini
- Genus: Clyzomedus
- Species: C. fastidiosus

Binomial name
- Clyzomedus fastidiosus (Boisduval, 1835)

Synonyms
- Acanthocinus fastidiosus Boisduval, 1835; Clyzomedus nanus (Pascoe, 1859); Coptops nanus Pascoe, 1859; Hebecerus fastidiosus (Boisduval, 1835)

Species of beetle

Clyzomedus fastidiosus is a species of beetle in the family Cerambycidae. It was described by Jean Baptiste Boisduval in 1835, originally under the genus Acanthocinus. It is known from Papua New Guinea, Indonesia, and the Philippines.

== Subspecies ==
- Clyzomedus fastidiosus fastidiosus (Boisduval, 1835)
- Clyzomedus fastidiosus philippinensis Breuning, 1965
- Clyzomedus fastidiosus toekanensis Breuning, 1965
