= Mesoereis bifasciata =

Scientific classification
- Kingdom: Animalia
- Phylum: Arthropoda
- Class: Insecta
- Order: Coleoptera
- Suborder: Polyphaga
- Infraorder: Cucujiformia
- Family: Cerambycidae
- Genus: Mesoereis
- Species: M. bifasciata

Binomial name
- Mesoereis bifasciata (Pic, 1925)

Synonyms
- Ereis bifasciata Pic, 1925; Mesoereis koshunensis Matsushita, 1933; Mesoereis koshunensis koshunensis Matsushita, 1933; Mesoereis koshunensis var. kikuchii Matsushita, 1933; Trichomesosa bifasciata (Pic, 1925)

Species of beetle

Mesoereis bifasciata is a species of beetle in the family Cerambycidae, and the type species of its genus. It was described by Maurice Pic in 1925, originally under the genus Ereis. It is known from Vietnam, China and Taiwan.
