= Sorbia tarsalis =

Scientific classification
- Domain: Eukaryota
- Kingdom: Animalia
- Phylum: Arthropoda
- Class: Insecta
- Order: Coleoptera
- Suborder: Polyphaga
- Infraorder: Cucujiformia
- Family: Cerambycidae
- Subfamily: Lamiinae
- Tribe: Mesosini
- Genus: Sorbia
- Species: S. tarsalis

Binomial name
- Sorbia tarsalis Pascoe, 1865

Synonyms
- Agelasta subtrigosa Pascoe, 1866; Paraemocia malaccensis Breuning, 1935

Species of beetle

Sorbia tarsalis is a species of beetle in the family Cerambycidae. It was described by Francis Polkinghorne Pascoe in 1865. It is known from Indonesia and Malaysia.
