= Clyzomedus javanicus =

Scientific classification
- Kingdom: Animalia
- Phylum: Arthropoda
- Clade: Pancrustacea
- Class: Insecta
- Order: Coleoptera
- Suborder: Polyphaga
- Infraorder: Cucujiformia
- Family: Cerambycidae
- Subfamily: Lamiinae
- Tribe: Mesosini
- Genus: Clyzomedus
- Species: C. javanicus

Binomial name
- Clyzomedus javanicus Breuning, 1963

Species of beetle

Clyzomedus javanicus is a species of beetle in the family Cerambycidae. It was described by Stephan von Breuning in 1963. It is known from Java.
