= Sorbia affinis =

Scientific classification
- Kingdom: Animalia
- Phylum: Arthropoda
- Class: Insecta
- Order: Coleoptera
- Suborder: Polyphaga
- Infraorder: Cucujiformia
- Family: Cerambycidae
- Subfamily: Lamiinae
- Tribe: Mesosini
- Genus: Sorbia
- Species: S. affinis

Binomial name
- Sorbia affinis Breuning, 1964

Species of beetle

Sorbia affinis is a species of beetle in the family Cerambycidae. It was described by Stephan von Breuning in 1964. It is known from Borneo.
