= Eurymesosa ventralis =

Scientific classification
- Kingdom: Animalia
- Phylum: Arthropoda
- Clade: Pancrustacea
- Class: Insecta
- Order: Coleoptera
- Suborder: Polyphaga
- Infraorder: Cucujiformia
- Family: Cerambycidae
- Genus: Eurymesosa
- Species: E. ventralis

Binomial name
- Eurymesosa ventralis (Pascoe, 1865)

Synonyms
- Ereis ventralis Pascoe, 1865

Species of beetle

Eurymesosa ventralis is a species of beetle in the family Cerambycidae. It was described Francis Polkinghorne Pascoe in 1865, originally under the genus Ereis. It is known from Java, Cambodia, Borneo, Malaysia and Vietnam.
