= Clyzomedus indicus =

Scientific classification
- Kingdom: Animalia
- Phylum: Arthropoda
- Class: Insecta
- Order: Coleoptera
- Suborder: Polyphaga
- Infraorder: Cucujiformia
- Family: Cerambycidae
- Subfamily: Lamiinae
- Tribe: Mesosini
- Genus: Clyzomedus
- Species: C. indicus

Binomial name
- Clyzomedus indicus Breuning, 1935

Species of beetle

Clyzomedus indicus is a species of beetle in the family Cerambycidae. It was described by Stephan von Breuning in 1935. It is known from India.
