= Eurymesosa albostictica =

Scientific classification
- Kingdom: Animalia
- Phylum: Arthropoda
- Class: Insecta
- Order: Coleoptera
- Suborder: Polyphaga
- Infraorder: Cucujiformia
- Family: Cerambycidae
- Genus: Eurymesosa
- Species: E. albostictica

Binomial name
- Eurymesosa albostictica Breuning, 1962

Species of beetle

Eurymesosa albostictica is a species of beetle in the family Cerambycidae. It was described by Stephan von Breuning in 1962. It is known from Laos.
