= Leptomesosa langana =

Scientific classification
- Kingdom: Animalia
- Phylum: Arthropoda
- Class: Insecta
- Order: Coleoptera
- Suborder: Polyphaga
- Infraorder: Cucujiformia
- Family: Cerambycidae
- Genus: Leptomesosa
- Species: L. langana

Binomial name
- Leptomesosa langana (Pic, 1917)

Synonyms
- Mesosa langana Pic, 1917

Species of beetle

Leptomesosa langana is a species of beetle in the family Cerambycidae. It was described by Maurice Pic in 1917, originally under the genus Mesosa. It is known from Vietnam and China.
