= Stenomesosa =

Scientific classification
- Kingdom: Animalia
- Phylum: Arthropoda
- Class: Insecta
- Order: Coleoptera
- Suborder: Polyphaga
- Infraorder: Cucujiformia
- Family: Cerambycidae
- Tribe: Mesosini
- Genus: Stenomesosa

Genus of beetles

Stenomesosa is a genus of longhorn beetles of the subfamily Lamiinae, containing the following species:

- Stenomesosa flavomaculata Breuning, 1939
- Stenomesosa rondoni Breuning, 1968
