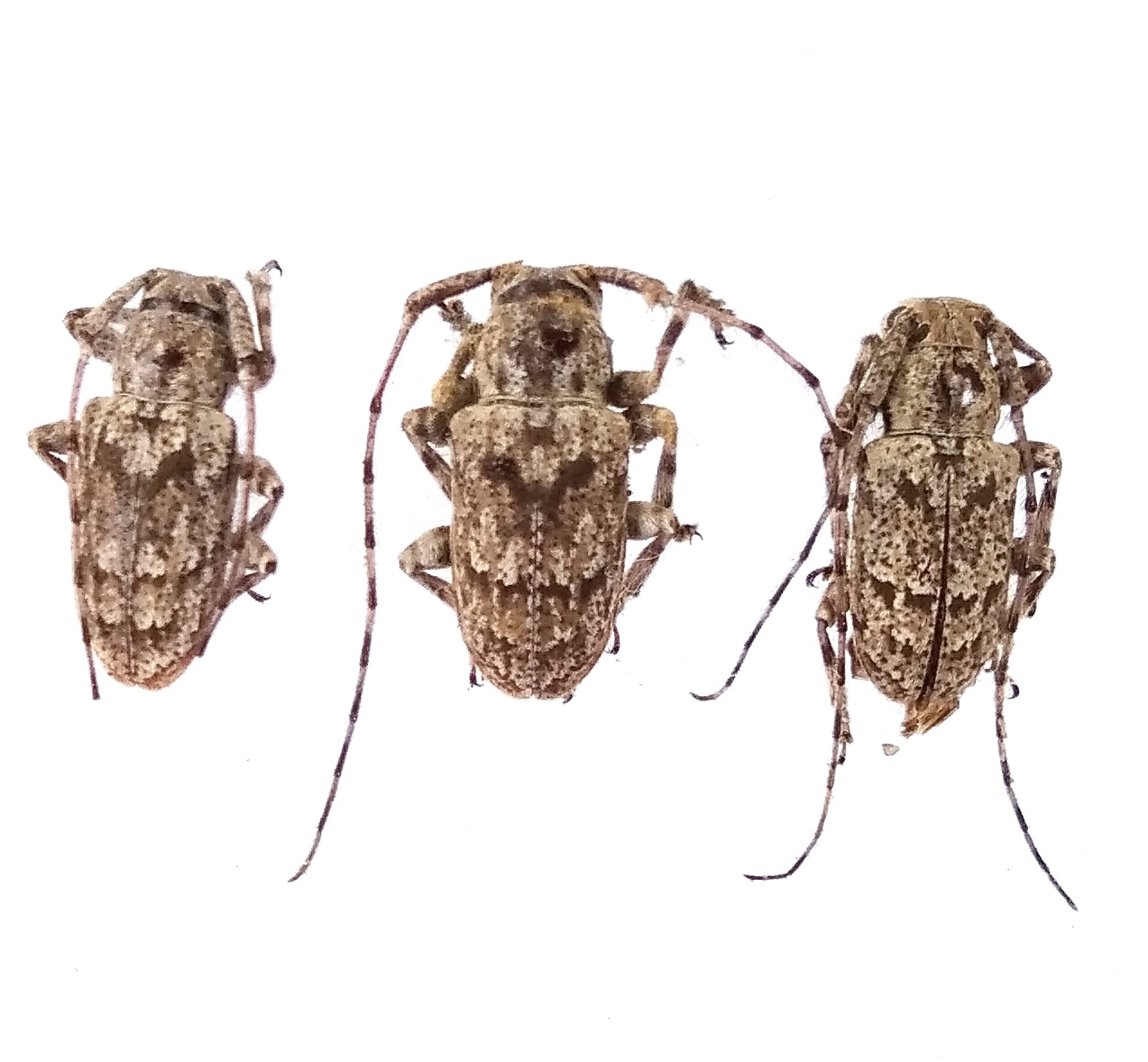
- Clyzomedus, Indonesia

Scientific classification
- Domain: Eukaryota
- Kingdom: Animalia
- Phylum: Arthropoda
- Class: Insecta
- Order: Coleoptera
- Suborder: Polyphaga
- Infraorder: Cucujiformia
- Family: Cerambycidae
- Subfamily: Lamiinae
- Tribe: Mesosini
- Genus: Clyzomedus; Pascoe, 1864

= Clyzomedus =

Genus of beetles

Clyzomedus is a genus of flat-faced longhorns in the beetle family Cerambycidae. There are about 10 described species in Clyzomedus.

The species of Clyzomedus have been recorded in China, Laos, India, Philippines, Malaysia, Indonesia, and Papua New Guinea.

== Species ==
These 10 species belong to the genus Clyzomedus:

- Clyzomedus annularis Pascoe, 1866 (Southeast Asia)
- Clyzomedus borneensis Breuning, 1936 (Borneo)
- Clyzomedus fastidiosus (Boisduval, 1835) (Molucca Islands, Papua New Guinea, Philippines)
- Clyzomedus indicus Breuning, 1935 (India)
- Clyzomedus javanicus Breuning, 1963 (Indonesia)
- Clyzomedus laosensis Breuning, 1965 (China: Hainan, Laos)
- Clyzomedus laosicus Breuning, 1962 (Laos)
- Clyzomedus pani Lin, Chen & Yamasako, 2023 (China: Beijing, Shaanxi, Henan and Anhui)
- Clyzomedus transversefasciatus Breuning, 1938 (India: Uttar Pradesh)
- Clyzomedus vittaticollis Breuning, 1938 (India)
