= Planodes vicarius =

Scientific classification
- Domain: Eukaryota
- Kingdom: Animalia
- Phylum: Arthropoda
- Class: Insecta
- Order: Coleoptera
- Suborder: Polyphaga
- Infraorder: Cucujiformia
- Family: Cerambycidae
- Genus: Planodes
- Species: P. vicarius

Binomial name
- Planodes vicarius Pascoe, 1865

Species of beetle

Planodes vicarius is a species of beetle in the family Cerambycidae. It was described by Francis Polkinghorne Pascoe in 1865.
