= Anipocregyes =

Scientific classification
- Kingdom: Animalia
- Phylum: Arthropoda
- Class: Insecta
- Order: Coleoptera
- Suborder: Polyphaga
- Infraorder: Cucujiformia
- Family: Cerambycidae
- Tribe: Mesosini
- Genus: Anipocregyes; Breuning, 1939

Genus of beetles

Anipocregyes is a genus of longhorn beetles of the subfamily Lamiinae, containing the following species:

- Anipocregyes laosensis Breuning, 1964
- Anipocregyes multifasciculatus Breuning, 1939
