= Plesiomesosites =

Scientific classification
- Kingdom: Animalia
- Phylum: Arthropoda
- Class: Insecta
- Order: Coleoptera
- Suborder: Polyphaga
- Infraorder: Cucujiformia
- Family: Cerambycidae
- Tribe: Mesosini
- Genus: †Plesiomesosites

Extinct genus of beetles

Plesiomesosites is an extinct genus of longhorn beetles of the subfamily Lamiinae, containing the following species:

- Plesiomesosites dissitus (Zhang, Sung & Zhang, 1994) †
- Plesiomesosites exaratus (Zhang, Sung & Zhang, 1994) †
- Plesiomesosites trigonius (Zhang, Sung & Zhang, 1994) †
