= Planodes deterrens =

Scientific classification
- Kingdom: Animalia
- Phylum: Arthropoda
- Class: Insecta
- Order: Coleoptera
- Suborder: Polyphaga
- Infraorder: Cucujiformia
- Family: Cerambycidae
- Genus: Planodes
- Species: P. deterrens

Binomial name
- Planodes deterrens Pascoe, 1865

Synonyms
- Planodes bifasciatus Aurivillius, 1911

Species of beetle

Planodes deterrens is a species of beetle in the family Cerambycidae. It was described by Francis Polkinghorne Pascoe in 1865. It is known from Malaysia and Borneo.
