= Pseudoplanodes xenoceroides =

Scientific classification
- Kingdom: Animalia
- Phylum: Arthropoda
- Class: Insecta
- Order: Coleoptera
- Suborder: Polyphaga
- Infraorder: Cucujiformia
- Family: Cerambycidae
- Genus: Pseudoplanodes
- Species: P. xenoceroides

Binomial name
- Pseudoplanodes xenoceroides Heller, 1923

Synonyms
- Cacia triangularis Breuning, 1980; Cerambyx xenoceroides Heller, 1923

Species of beetle

Pseudoplanodes xenoceroides is a species of beetle in the family Cerambycidae. It is known from Heller in 1923. It is known from the Philippines. It contains the varietas Pseudoplanodes xenoceroides var. helleri.
