= Eurymesosa affinis =

Scientific classification
- Kingdom: Animalia
- Phylum: Arthropoda
- Class: Insecta
- Order: Coleoptera
- Suborder: Polyphaga
- Infraorder: Cucujiformia
- Family: Cerambycidae
- Genus: Eurymesosa
- Species: E. affinis

Binomial name
- Eurymesosa affinis Breuning, 1970

Species of beetle

Eurymesosa affinis is a species of beetle in the family Cerambycidae. It was described by Stephan von Breuning in 1970. It is known from Laos.
