= Mesocacia punctifasciata =

Scientific classification
- Kingdom: Animalia
- Phylum: Arthropoda
- Class: Insecta
- Order: Coleoptera
- Suborder: Polyphaga
- Infraorder: Cucujiformia
- Family: Cerambycidae
- Genus: Mesocacia
- Species: M. punctifasciata

Binomial name
- Mesocacia punctifasciata Gressitt, 1940

Species of beetle

Mesocacia punctifasciata is a species of beetle in the family Cerambycidae. It was described by Gressitt in 1940. It is known from China.
