= Mesoereis =

Scientific classification
- Kingdom: Animalia
- Phylum: Arthropoda
- Class: Insecta
- Order: Coleoptera
- Suborder: Polyphaga
- Infraorder: Cucujiformia
- Family: Cerambycidae
- Tribe: Mesosini
- Genus: Mesoereis

Genus of beetles

Mesoereis is a genus of longhorn beetles of the subfamily Lamiinae, containing the following species:

- Mesoereis horianus (Breuning & Ohbayashi, 1966)
- Mesoereis koshunensis Matsushita, 1933
- Mesoereis yunnanus Breuning, 1974
