= Mesosaimia mausoni =

Scientific classification
- Kingdom: Animalia
- Phylum: Arthropoda
- Class: Insecta
- Order: Coleoptera
- Suborder: Polyphaga
- Infraorder: Cucujiformia
- Family: Cerambycidae
- Genus: Mesosaimia
- Species: M. mausoni

Binomial name
- Mesosaimia mausoni (Breuning, 1950)

Synonyms
- Trichipocregyes mausoni Breuning, 1950

Species of beetle

Mesosaimia mausoni is a species of beetle in the family Cerambycidae. It was described by Stephan von Breuning in 1950.
