= Anagelasta apicalis =

Scientific classification
- Kingdom: Animalia
- Phylum: Arthropoda
- Class: Insecta
- Order: Coleoptera
- Suborder: Polyphaga
- Infraorder: Cucujiformia
- Family: Cerambycidae
- Genus: Anagelasta
- Species: A. apicalis

Binomial name
- Anagelasta apicalis Pic, 1925

Synonyms
- Choeromorpha adspersa Schwarzer, 1931

Species of beetle

Anagelasta apicalis is a species of beetle in the family Cerambycidae. It was described by Maurice Pic in 1925. It is known from Laos, China and Vietnam.
