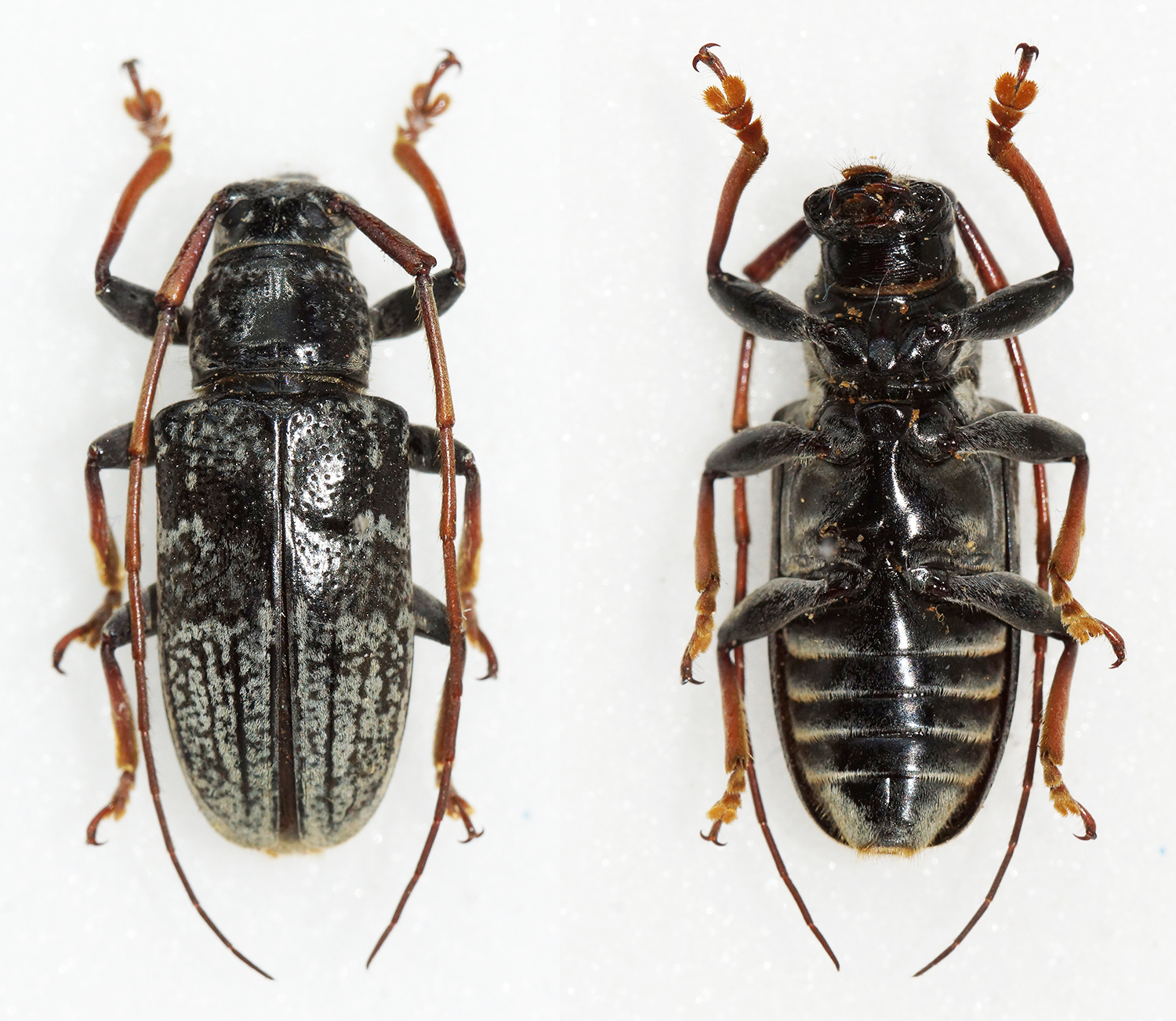

Scientific classification
- Kingdom: Animalia
- Phylum: Arthropoda
- Class: Insecta
- Order: Coleoptera
- Suborder: Polyphaga
- Infraorder: Cucujiformia
- Family: Cerambycidae
- Genus: Aemocia
- Species: A. farinosa

Binomial name
- Aemocia farinosa Pascoe, 1865

= Aemocia farinosa =

Species of beetle

Aemocia farinosa is a species of beetle in the family Cerambycidae. It was described by Francis Polkinghorne Pascoe in 1865. It is known from the Molucca Islands.
