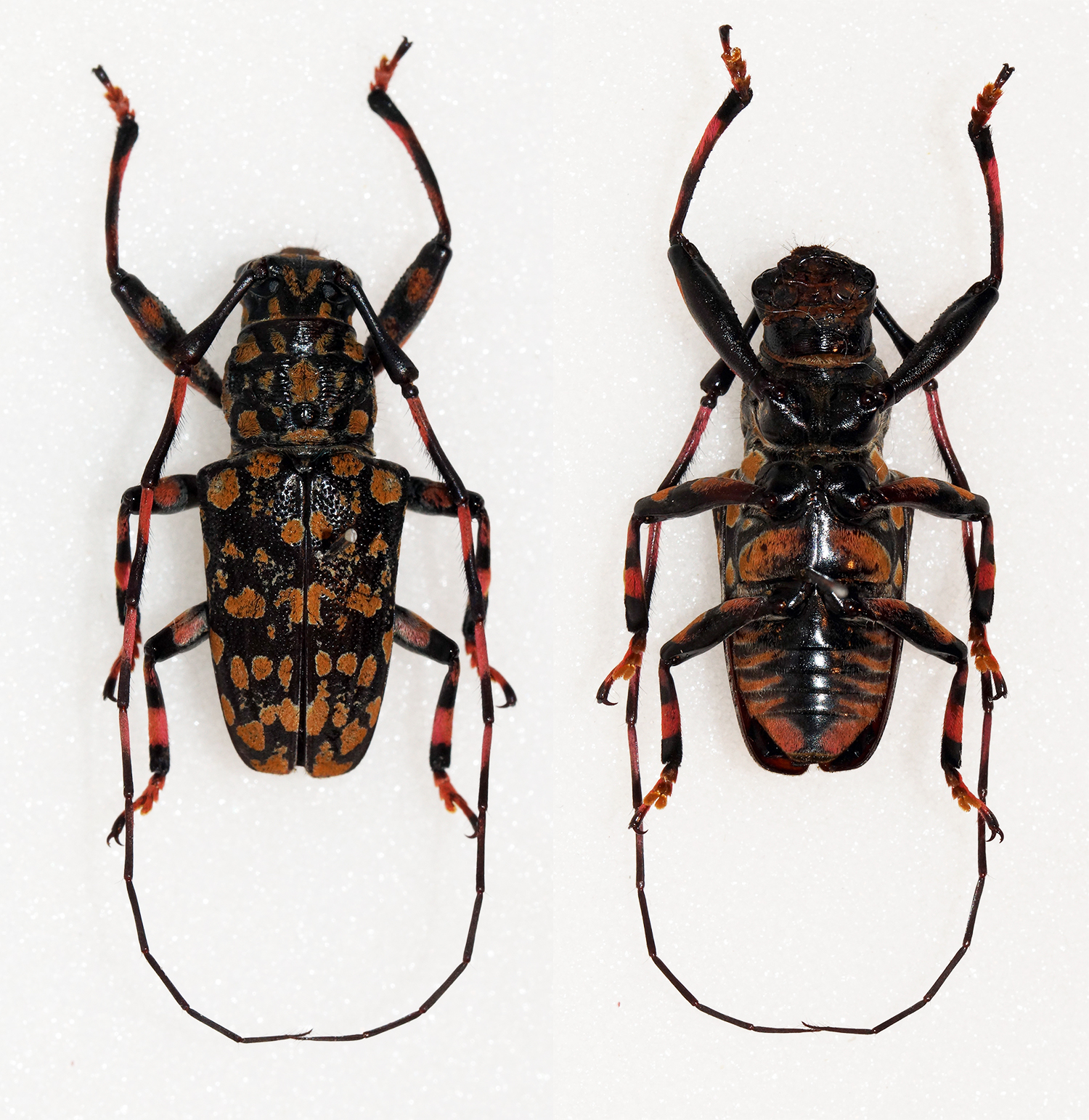
- Golsinda corallina

Scientific classification
- Kingdom: Animalia
- Phylum: Arthropoda
- Clade: Pancrustacea
- Class: Insecta
- Order: Coleoptera
- Suborder: Polyphaga
- Infraorder: Cucujiformia
- Family: Cerambycidae
- Subfamily: Lamiinae
- Tribe: Mesosini
- Genus: Golsinda; Thomson, 1861

= Golsinda =

Genus of beetles

Golsinda is a genus of longhorn beetles of the subfamily Lamiinae and tribe Mesosini, recorded from Indochina, Hainan island and Malaysia.

== Species ==
As of October 2026, Biolib includes the following species:

1. Golsinda basicornis Gahan, 1894
2. Golsinda basigranosa Breuning, 1938
3. Golsinda corallina Pascoe, 1857 - type species
4. Golsinda malaysiaca Yamasako & Makihara, 2011
