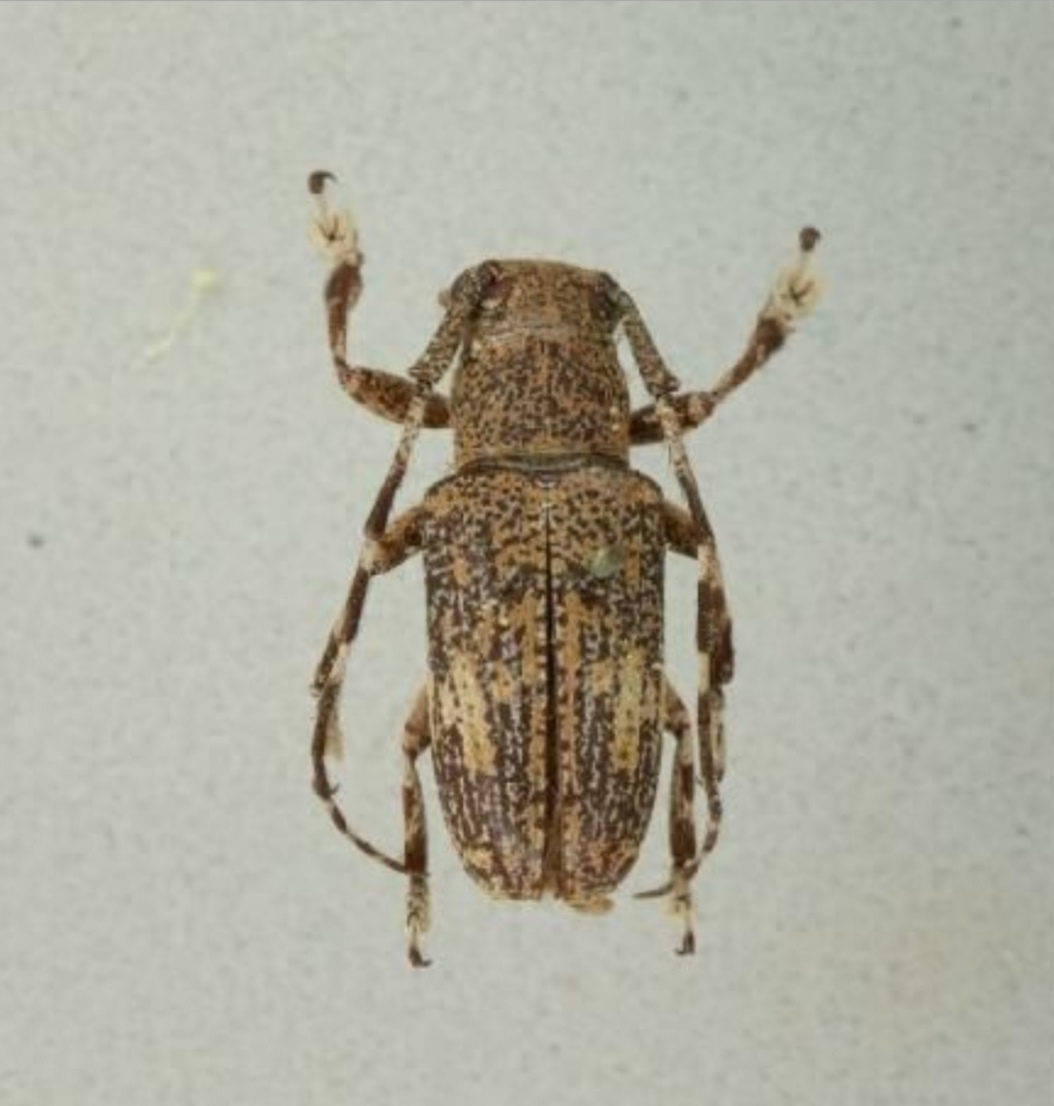
- Sorbia tarsalis, Borneo

Scientific classification
- Kingdom: Animalia
- Phylum: Arthropoda
- Class: Insecta
- Order: Coleoptera
- Suborder: Polyphaga
- Infraorder: Cucujiformia
- Family: Cerambycidae
- Subfamily: Lamiinae
- Tribe: Mesosini
- Genus: Sorbia; Pascoe, 1865

Synonyms
- Paraemocia Breuning, 1935

= Sorbia (beetle) =

Genus of beetles

Sorbia is a genus of long-horned beetles in the beetle family Cerambycidae. There are at least four described species in Sorbia, found in Southeast Asia.

== Species ==
These four species belong to the genus Sorbia:

- Sorbia affinis Breuning, 1964 (Indonesia and Malaysia)
- Sorbia laterialba Breuning, 1939 (Indonesia)
- Sorbia sericans Breuning, 1948 (Cambodia)
- Sorbia tarsalis Pascoe, 1865 (Indonesia and Malaysia)
