= Mesocacia pulla =

Scientific classification
- Kingdom: Animalia
- Phylum: Arthropoda
- Class: Insecta
- Order: Coleoptera
- Suborder: Polyphaga
- Infraorder: Cucujiformia
- Family: Cerambycidae
- Genus: Mesocacia
- Species: M. pulla

Binomial name
- Mesocacia pulla Zhang, 1989 †

Species of beetle

Mesocacia pulla is an extinct species of beetle in the family Cerambycidae, that existed between the Lower and Middle Miocene. It was described by Zhang in 1989.
