= Pseudoplanodes =

Scientific classification
- Kingdom: Animalia
- Phylum: Arthropoda
- Class: Insecta
- Order: Coleoptera
- Suborder: Polyphaga
- Infraorder: Cucujiformia
- Family: Cerambycidae
- Tribe: Mesosini
- Genus: Pseudoplanodes

Genus of beetles

Pseudoplanodes is a genus of longhorn beetles of the subfamily Lamiinae, containing the following species:

- Pseudoplanodes aurivilliusi (Schwarzer, 1926)
- Pseudoplanodes mindoroensis Breuning, 1945
- Pseudoplanodes xenoceroides Heller, 1923
