= Ereis sumatrensis =

Scientific classification
- Kingdom: Animalia
- Phylum: Arthropoda
- Class: Insecta
- Order: Coleoptera
- Suborder: Polyphaga
- Infraorder: Cucujiformia
- Family: Cerambycidae
- Genus: Ereis
- Species: E. sumatrensis

Binomial name
- Ereis sumatrensis Gahan, 1907

Species of beetle

Ereis sumatrensis is a species of beetle in the family Cerambycidae. It was described by Charles Joseph Gahan in 1907. It is known from Sumatra.
