= Zelota spathomelina =

Scientific classification
- Kingdom: Animalia
- Phylum: Arthropoda
- Class: Insecta
- Order: Coleoptera
- Suborder: Polyphaga
- Infraorder: Cucujiformia
- Family: Cerambycidae
- Genus: Zelota
- Species: Z. spathomelina

Binomial name
- Zelota spathomelina Gahan in Shelford, 1902

Species of beetle

Zelota spathomelina is a species of beetle in the family Cerambycidae. It was described by Charles Joseph Gahan in 1902. It is known from Borneo.
