= Mesoereis horianus =

Scientific classification
- Kingdom: Animalia
- Phylum: Arthropoda
- Class: Insecta
- Order: Coleoptera
- Suborder: Polyphaga
- Infraorder: Cucujiformia
- Family: Cerambycidae
- Genus: Mesoereis
- Species: M. horianus

Binomial name
- Mesoereis horianus (Breuning & Ohbayashi, 1966)

Species of beetle

Mesoereis horianus is a species of beetle in the family Cerambycidae. It was described by Stephan von Breuning and Ohbayashi in 1966.
