= Microcacia longiscapa =

Scientific classification
- Kingdom: Animalia
- Phylum: Arthropoda
- Class: Insecta
- Order: Coleoptera
- Suborder: Polyphaga
- Infraorder: Cucujiformia
- Family: Cerambycidae
- Genus: Microcacia
- Species: M. longiscapa

Binomial name
- Microcacia longiscapa Breuning, 1939

Species of beetle

Microcacia longiscapa is a species of beetle in the family Cerambycidae. It was described by Stephan von Breuning in 1939. It is known from Borneo.
