= Paragolsinda siamensis =

Scientific classification
- Kingdom: Animalia
- Phylum: Arthropoda
- Class: Insecta
- Order: Coleoptera
- Suborder: Polyphaga
- Infraorder: Cucujiformia
- Family: Cerambycidae
- Genus: Paragolsinda
- Species: P. siamensis

Binomial name
- Paragolsinda siamensis Yamasako & Ohbayashi, 2011

Species of beetle

Paragolsinda siamensis is a species of beetle in the family Cerambycidae. It was described by Yamasako and Ohbayashi in 2011.
