= Paraplanodes simplicornis =

Scientific classification
- Kingdom: Animalia
- Phylum: Arthropoda
- Class: Insecta
- Order: Coleoptera
- Suborder: Polyphaga
- Infraorder: Cucujiformia
- Family: Cerambycidae
- Genus: Paraplanodes
- Species: P. simplicornis

Binomial name
- Paraplanodes simplicornis Heller, 1921

Species of beetle

Paraplanodes simplicornis is a species of beetle in the family Cerambycidae. It was described by Heller in 1921.
