= Therippia latefasciata =

Scientific classification
- Kingdom: Animalia
- Phylum: Arthropoda
- Class: Insecta
- Order: Coleoptera
- Suborder: Polyphaga
- Infraorder: Cucujiformia
- Family: Cerambycidae
- Genus: Therippia
- Species: T. latefasciata

Binomial name
- Therippia latefasciata Breuning, 1936

Synonyms
- Therippia (Paratherippia) latefasciata Breuning, 1936

Species of beetle

Therippia latefasciata is a species of beetle in the family Cerambycidae. It was described by Stephan von Breuning in 1936.
