= Mesosaimia wakaharai =

Scientific classification
- Kingdom: Animalia
- Phylum: Arthropoda
- Class: Insecta
- Order: Coleoptera
- Suborder: Polyphaga
- Infraorder: Cucujiformia
- Family: Cerambycidae
- Genus: Mesosaimia
- Species: M. wakaharai

Binomial name
- Mesosaimia wakaharai Yamasako, 2014

Species of beetle

Mesosaimia wakaharai is a species of beetle in the family Cerambycidae. It was described by Yamasako in 2014.
