= Leptomesosa cephalotes =

Scientific classification
- Kingdom: Animalia
- Phylum: Arthropoda
- Class: Insecta
- Order: Coleoptera
- Suborder: Polyphaga
- Infraorder: Cucujiformia
- Family: Cerambycidae
- Genus: Leptomesosa
- Species: L. cephalotes

Binomial name
- Leptomesosa cephalotes (Pic, 1903)

Synonyms
- Mesosa cephalotes Pic, 1903; Mesosa nodosipennis Pic, 1917

Species of beetle

Leptomesosa cephalotes is a species of beetle in the family Cerambycidae. It was described by Maurice Pic in 1903, originally under the genus Mesosa. It is known from Laos and China.
