= Aemocia ichthyosomoides =

Scientific classification
- Kingdom: Animalia
- Phylum: Arthropoda
- Class: Insecta
- Order: Coleoptera
- Suborder: Polyphaga
- Infraorder: Cucujiformia
- Family: Cerambycidae
- Genus: Aemocia
- Species: A. ichthyosomoides

Binomial name
- Aemocia ichthyosomoides Thomson, 1864

Species of beetle

Aemocia ichthyosomoides is a species of beetle in the family Cerambycidae. It was described by James Thomson in 1864. It is known from Moluccas.
