= Metacoptops =

Scientific classification
- Kingdom: Animalia
- Phylum: Arthropoda
- Class: Insecta
- Order: Coleoptera
- Suborder: Polyphaga
- Infraorder: Cucujiformia
- Family: Cerambycidae
- Tribe: Mesosini
- Genus: Metacoptops; Breuning, 1939
- Species: M. fasciculata

Binomial name
- Metacoptops fasciculata (Aurivillius, 1911)

Genus of beetles

Metacoptops is a monotypic beetle genus in the family Cerambycidae described by Stephan von Breuning in 1939. Its single species, Metacoptops fasciculata, was described by Per Olof Christopher Aurivillius in 1911.
