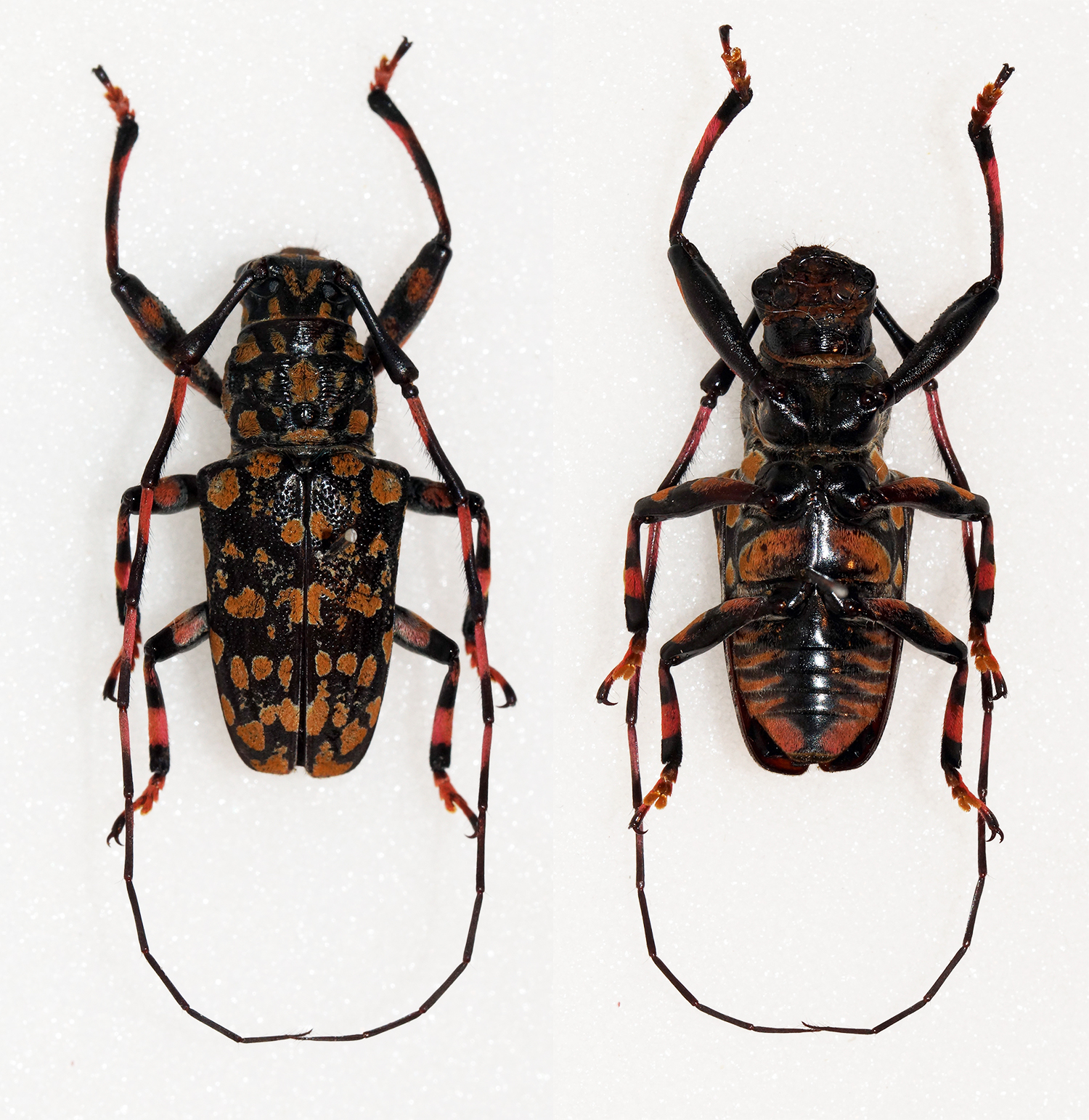

Scientific classification
- Kingdom: Animalia
- Phylum: Arthropoda
- Clade: Pancrustacea
- Class: Insecta
- Order: Coleoptera
- Suborder: Polyphaga
- Infraorder: Cucujiformia
- Family: Cerambycidae
- Genus: Golsinda
- Species: G. corallina

Binomial name
- Golsinda corallina Pascoe, 1857

= Golsinda corallina =

Species of beetle

Golsinda corallina is a species of beetle in the family Cerambycidae. It was described by Francis Polkinghorne Pascoe in 1857. It is known from Laos, Borneo and Sumatra.
