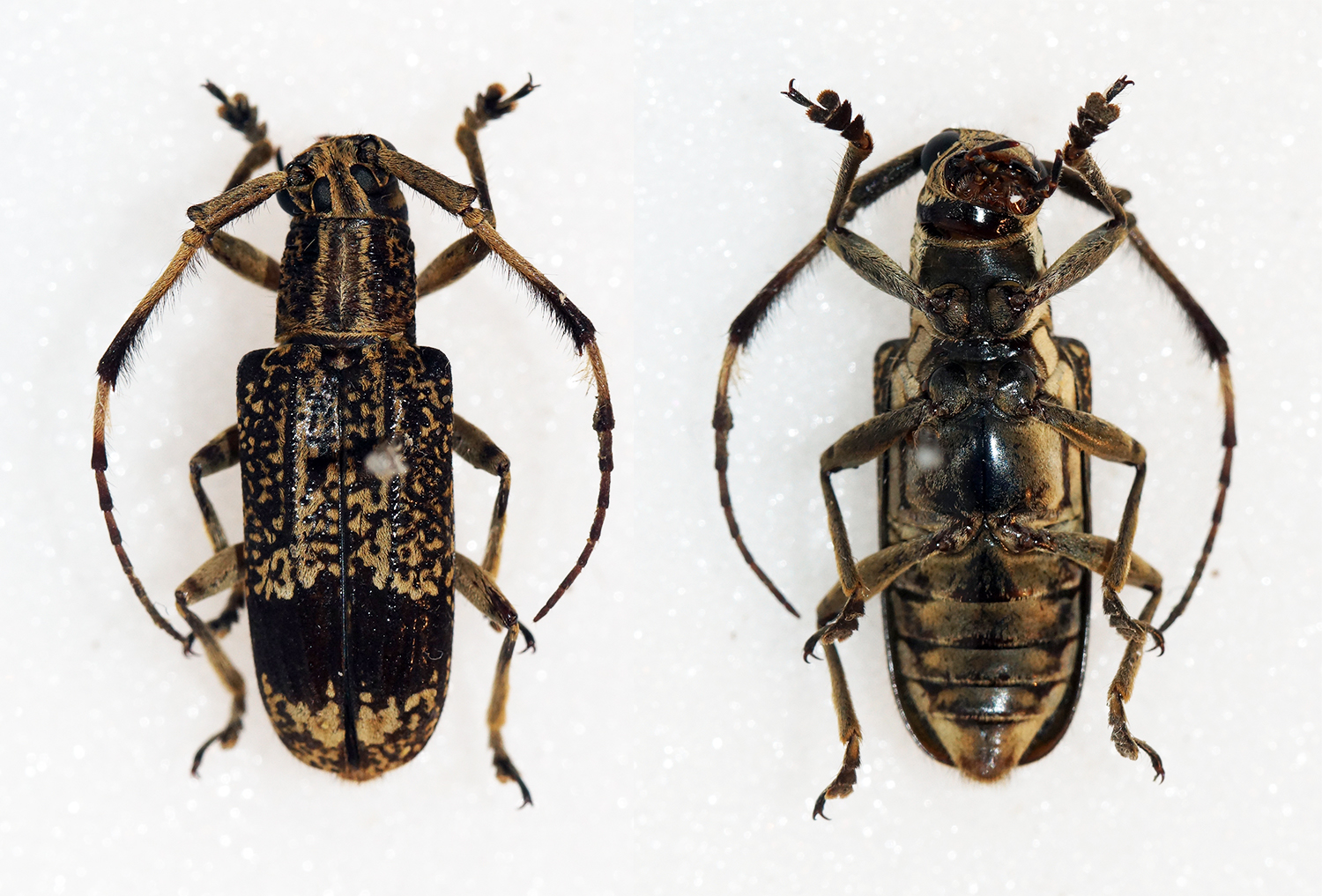
- Planodes denticornis

Scientific classification
- Domain: Eukaryota
- Kingdom: Animalia
- Phylum: Arthropoda
- Class: Insecta
- Order: Coleoptera
- Suborder: Polyphaga
- Infraorder: Cucujiformia
- Family: Cerambycidae
- Tribe: Mesosini
- Genus: Planodes

= Planodes =

Genus of beetles

Planodes is a genus of longhorn beetles of the subfamily Lamiinae, containing the following species:

- Planodes ambonensis Breuning & Chûjô, 1965
- Planodes annamensis Breuning, 1957
- Planodes denticornis (Chevrolat, 1858)
- Planodes deterrens Pascoe, 1865
- Planodes encaustus Pascoe, 1865
- Planodes eximius Aurivillius, 1926
- Planodes gebeensis Breuning, 1970
- Planodes johorensis Breuning, 1936
- Planodes leporinus Pascoe, 1865
- Planodes longemaculatus Breuning, 1960
- Planodes luctuosus Pascoe, 1865
- Planodes papuanus Breuning, 1948
- Planodes papulosus Pascoe, 1865
- Planodes pseudosatelles Breuning, 1948
- Planodes quaternarius Newman, 1842
- Planodes satelles Pascoe, 1865
- Planodes stratus Heller, 1900
- Planodes toekanensis Breuning, 1959
- Planodes variegatus Aurivillius, 1911
- Planodes vicarius Pascoe, 1865
