= Paripocregyes fuscovittatus =

Scientific classification
- Kingdom: Animalia
- Phylum: Arthropoda
- Class: Insecta
- Order: Coleoptera
- Suborder: Polyphaga
- Infraorder: Cucujiformia
- Family: Cerambycidae
- Genus: Paripocregyes
- Species: P. fuscovittatus

Binomial name
- Paripocregyes fuscovittatus Breuning, 1938

Species of beetle

Paripocregyes fuscovittatus is a species of beetle in the family Cerambycidae. It was described by Stephan von Breuning in 1938.
