= Paripocregyes terminaliae =

Scientific classification
- Kingdom: Animalia
- Phylum: Arthropoda
- Clade: Pancrustacea
- Class: Insecta
- Order: Coleoptera
- Suborder: Polyphaga
- Infraorder: Cucujiformia
- Family: Cerambycidae
- Genus: Paripocregyes
- Species: P. terminaliae

Binomial name
- Paripocregyes terminaliae (Fisher, 1933)

Synonyms
- Ipocregyes terminaliae Fisher, 1933

Species of beetle

Paripocregyes terminaliae is a species of cucujiform beetle that belongs to the family Cerambycidae.

It was described by Warren S. Fisher in 1933 being originally described under the genus Ipocregyes.
