= Paragolsinda =

Scientific classification
- Kingdom: Animalia
- Phylum: Arthropoda
- Class: Insecta
- Order: Coleoptera
- Suborder: Polyphaga
- Infraorder: Cucujiformia
- Family: Cerambycidae
- Subfamily: Lamiinae
- Tribe: Mesosini
- Genus: Paragolsinda; Breuning, 1956

Genus of beetles

Paragolsinda is a genus of longhorn beetles of the subfamily Lamiinae, containing the following species:

- Paragolsinda fruhstorferi Breuning, 1956
- Paragolsinda obscura (Matsushita, 1933)
- Paragolsinda siamensis Yamasako & Ohbayashi, 2011
- Paragolsinda tonkinensis (Breuning, 1938)
