= Planodes longemaculatus =

Scientific classification
- Kingdom: Animalia
- Phylum: Arthropoda
- Class: Insecta
- Order: Coleoptera
- Suborder: Polyphaga
- Infraorder: Cucujiformia
- Family: Cerambycidae
- Genus: Planodes
- Species: P. longemaculatus

Binomial name
- Planodes longemaculatus Breuning, 1960

Synonyms
- Planodes longemaculata Breuning, 1960 (misspelling)

Species of beetle

Planodes longemaculatus is a species of beetle in the family Cerambycidae. It was described by Stephan von Breuning in 1960, originally as Planodes longemaculata. It is known from the Philippines.
