= Spinipocregyes =

Scientific classification
- Kingdom: Animalia
- Phylum: Arthropoda
- Clade: Pancrustacea
- Class: Insecta
- Order: Coleoptera
- Suborder: Polyphaga
- Infraorder: Cucujiformia
- Family: Cerambycidae
- Tribe: Mesosini
- Genus: Spinipocregyes

Genus of beetles

Spinipocregyes is a genus of longhorn beetles of the subfamily Lamiinae, containing the following five species:

- Spinipocregyes laosensis Breuning, 1963
- Spinipocregyes nigrescens Breuning, 1949
- Spinipocregyes rufosignatus Breuning, 1968
- Spinipocregyes viridescens Yamasaka & Befu, 2016
- Spinipocregyes wenhsini Bi, 2013
