= Pseudochoeromorpha ochracea =

Scientific classification
- Kingdom: Animalia
- Phylum: Arthropoda
- Class: Insecta
- Order: Coleoptera
- Suborder: Polyphaga
- Infraorder: Cucujiformia
- Family: Cerambycidae
- Genus: Pseudochoeromorpha
- Species: P. ochracea

Binomial name
- Pseudochoeromorpha ochracea (Thomson, 1878)

Species of beetle

Pseudochoeromorpha ochracea is a species of beetle in the family Cerambycidae. It was described by James Thomson in 1878.
