= Mesosaimia =

Scientific classification
- Kingdom: Animalia
- Phylum: Arthropoda
- Class: Insecta
- Order: Coleoptera
- Suborder: Polyphaga
- Infraorder: Cucujiformia
- Family: Cerambycidae
- Subfamily: Lamiinae
- Tribe: Mesosini
- Genus: Mesosaimia; Breuning, 1938

Genus of beetles

Mesosaimia is a genus of longhorn beetles of the subfamily Lamiinae, containing the following species:

- Mesosaimia mausoni (Breuning, 1950)
- Mesosaimia robusta Breuning, 1938
- Mesosaimia similis (Breuning, 1950)
- Mesosaimia wakaharai Yamasako, 2014
