= Elelea concinna =

Scientific classification
- Kingdom: Animalia
- Phylum: Arthropoda
- Class: Insecta
- Order: Coleoptera
- Suborder: Polyphaga
- Infraorder: Cucujiformia
- Family: Cerambycidae
- Genus: Elelea
- Species: E. concinna

Binomial name
- Elelea concinna (Pascoe, 1857)

Synonyms
- Cacia concinna Pascoe, 1857

Species of beetle

Elelea concinna is a species of beetle in the family Cerambycidae. It was described by Francis Polkinghorne Pascoe in 1857. It is known from Borneo and Malaysia.
