= Eurymesosa multinigromaculata =

Scientific classification
- Kingdom: Animalia
- Phylum: Arthropoda
- Class: Insecta
- Order: Coleoptera
- Suborder: Polyphaga
- Infraorder: Cucujiformia
- Family: Cerambycidae
- Genus: Eurymesosa
- Species: E. multinigromaculata

Binomial name
- Eurymesosa multinigromaculata Breuning, 1974

Species of beetle

Eurymesosa multinigromaculata is a species of beetle in the family Cerambycidae. It was described by Stephan von Breuning in 1974. It is known from Cambodia.
