= Metipocregyes affinis =

Scientific classification
- Kingdom: Animalia
- Phylum: Arthropoda
- Class: Insecta
- Order: Coleoptera
- Suborder: Polyphaga
- Infraorder: Cucujiformia
- Family: Cerambycidae
- Genus: Metipocregyes
- Species: M. affinis

Binomial name
- Metipocregyes affinis Breuning, 1968

Species of beetle

Metipocregyes affinis is a species of beetle in the family Cerambycidae. It was described by Stephan von Breuning in 1968.
