= Hypocacia biplagiata =

Scientific classification
- Kingdom: Animalia
- Phylum: Arthropoda
- Class: Insecta
- Order: Coleoptera
- Suborder: Polyphaga
- Infraorder: Cucujiformia
- Family: Cerambycidae
- Genus: Hypocacia
- Species: H. biplagiata

Binomial name
- Hypocacia biplagiata Breuning, 1935

Species of beetle

Hypocacia biplagiata is a species of beetle in the family Cerambycidae. It was described by Stephan von Breuning in 1935. It is known from India.
