= Therippia decorata =

Scientific classification
- Kingdom: Animalia
- Phylum: Arthropoda
- Clade: Pancrustacea
- Class: Insecta
- Order: Coleoptera
- Suborder: Polyphaga
- Infraorder: Cucujiformia
- Family: Cerambycidae
- Genus: Therippia
- Species: T. decorata

Binomial name
- Therippia decorata Pascoe, 1865

Species of beetle

Therippia decorata is a species of beetle in the family Cerambycidae. It was described by Francis Polkinghorne Pascoe in 1865.
