= Therippia =

Scientific classification
- Kingdom: Animalia
- Phylum: Arthropoda
- Class: Insecta
- Order: Coleoptera
- Suborder: Polyphaga
- Infraorder: Cucujiformia
- Family: Cerambycidae
- Subfamily: Lamiinae
- Tribe: Mesosini
- Genus: Therippia; Pascoe, 1865

Genus of beetles

Therippia is a genus of longhorn beetles of the subfamily Lamiinae, containing the following species:

subgenus Paratherippia

- Therippia affinis Breuning, 1938
- Therippia latefasciata Breuning, 1936
- Therippia mediofasciata Breuning, 1935
- Therippia triloba (Pascoe, 1859)

subgenus Therippia

- Therippia decorata Pascoe, 1865
- Therippia signata (Gahan, 1890)
