= Paracoptops toxopoei =

Scientific classification
- Kingdom: Animalia
- Phylum: Arthropoda
- Class: Insecta
- Order: Coleoptera
- Suborder: Polyphaga
- Infraorder: Cucujiformia
- Family: Cerambycidae
- Genus: Paracoptops
- Species: P. toxopoei

Binomial name
- Paracoptops toxopoei Aurivillius, 1926

Species of beetle

Paracoptops toxopoei is a species of beetle in the family Cerambycidae. It was described by Per Olof Christopher Aurivillius in 1926.
