= Pseudochoeromorpha =

Scientific classification
- Kingdom: Animalia
- Phylum: Arthropoda
- Class: Insecta
- Order: Coleoptera
- Suborder: Polyphaga
- Infraorder: Cucujiformia
- Family: Cerambycidae
- Subfamily: Lamiinae
- Tribe: Mesosini
- Genus: Pseudochoeromorpha; Breuning, 1936

Genus of beetles

Pseudochoeromorpha is a genus of longhorn beetles of the subfamily Lamiinae, containing the following species:

- Pseudochoeromorpha lar (Pascoe, 1865)
- Pseudochoeromorpha ochracea (Thomson, 1878)
- Pseudochoeromorpha siamensis (Breuning, 1936)
- Pseudochoeromorpha vagemarmorata (Breuning, 1961)
