= Paripocregyes =

Scientific classification
- Kingdom: Animalia
- Phylum: Arthropoda
- Class: Insecta
- Order: Coleoptera
- Suborder: Polyphaga
- Infraorder: Cucujiformia
- Family: Cerambycidae
- Tribe: Mesosini
- Genus: Paripocregyes

Genus of beetles

Paripocregyes is a genus of longhorn beetles of the subfamily Lamiinae, containing the following species:

- Paripocregyes brunneomaculatus Breuning, 1938
- Paripocregyes fuscovittatus Breuning, 1938
- Paripocregyes terminaliae (Fisher, 1933)
