= Therippia affinis =

Scientific classification
- Kingdom: Animalia
- Phylum: Arthropoda
- Class: Insecta
- Order: Coleoptera
- Suborder: Polyphaga
- Infraorder: Cucujiformia
- Family: Cerambycidae
- Genus: Therippia
- Species: T. affinis

Binomial name
- Therippia affinis Breuning, 1938

Synonyms
- Therippia (Paratherippia) affinis Breuning, 1938

Species of beetle

Therippia affinis is a species of beetle in the family Cerambycidae. It was described by Stephan von Breuning in 1938.
