= Ereis subfasciata =

Scientific classification
- Kingdom: Animalia
- Phylum: Arthropoda
- Class: Insecta
- Order: Coleoptera
- Suborder: Polyphaga
- Infraorder: Cucujiformia
- Family: Cerambycidae
- Genus: Ereis
- Species: E. subfasciata

Binomial name
- Ereis subfasciata Pic, 1925

Species of beetle

Ereis subfasciata is a species of beetle in the family Cerambycidae. It was described by Maurice Pic in 1925. It is known from Vietnam and China.
