= Metipocregyes =

Scientific classification
- Kingdom: Animalia
- Phylum: Arthropoda
- Class: Insecta
- Order: Coleoptera
- Suborder: Polyphaga
- Infraorder: Cucujiformia
- Family: Cerambycidae
- Tribe: Mesosini
- Genus: Metipocregyes

Genus of beetles

Metipocregyes is a genus of longhorn beetles of the subfamily Lamiinae, containing the following species:

- Metipocregyes affinis Breuning, 1968
- Metipocregyes nodieri (Pic, 1933)
- Metipocregyes rondoni Breuning, 1965
