= Elelea multipunctata =

Scientific classification
- Kingdom: Animalia
- Phylum: Arthropoda
- Class: Insecta
- Order: Coleoptera
- Suborder: Polyphaga
- Infraorder: Cucujiformia
- Family: Cerambycidae
- Genus: Elelea
- Species: E. multipunctata

Binomial name
- Elelea multipunctata Heller, 1923

Species of beetle

Elelea multipunctata is a species of beetle in the family Cerambycidae. It was described by Heller in 1923. It inhabits the island of Borneo.
