= Ereis javanica =

Scientific classification
- Kingdom: Animalia
- Phylum: Arthropoda
- Clade: Pancrustacea
- Class: Insecta
- Order: Coleoptera
- Suborder: Polyphaga
- Infraorder: Cucujiformia
- Family: Cerambycidae
- Genus: Ereis
- Species: E. javanica

Binomial name
- Ereis javanica Breuning, 1936

Species of beetle

Ereis javanica is a species of beetle in the family Cerambycidae. It was described by Stephan von Breuning in 1936. It is known from Java.
