= Anagelasta =

Scientific classification
- Kingdom: Animalia
- Phylum: Arthropoda
- Class: Insecta
- Order: Coleoptera
- Suborder: Polyphaga
- Infraorder: Cucujiformia
- Family: Cerambycidae
- Tribe: Mesosini
- Genus: Anagelasta; Pic, 1925

Genus of beetles

Anagelasta is a genus of longhorn beetles of the subfamily Lamiinae, containing the following species:

subgenus Anagelasta

- Anagelasta apicalis Pic, 1925
- Anagelasta grisea Breuning, 1936
- Anagelasta lineifrons Gressitt, 1951

subgenus Mesagelasta

- Anagelasta nigromaculata Breuning, 1938
- Anagelasta transversevittata Breuning, 1964
- Anagelasta trimaculata Breuning, 1938
