= Eurymesosa =

Scientific classification
- Kingdom: Animalia
- Phylum: Arthropoda
- Class: Insecta
- Order: Coleoptera
- Suborder: Polyphaga
- Infraorder: Cucujiformia
- Family: Cerambycidae
- Subfamily: Lamiinae
- Tribe: Mesosini
- Genus: Eurymesosa; Breuning, 1938

Genus of beetles

Eurymesosa is a genus of longhorn beetles of the subfamily Lamiinae, containing the following species:

- Eurymesosa affinis Breuning, 1970
- Eurymesosa albostictica Breuning, 1962
- Eurymesosa multinigromaculata Breuning, 1974
- Eurymesosa ventralis (Pascoe, 1865)
- Eurymesosa ziranzhiyi (Meiying Lin, 2016)

Type species: Ereis ventralis Pascoe, 1865, by original designation
