= Ereis anthriboides =

Scientific classification
- Kingdom: Animalia
- Phylum: Arthropoda
- Class: Insecta
- Order: Coleoptera
- Suborder: Polyphaga
- Infraorder: Cucujiformia
- Family: Cerambycidae
- Genus: Ereis
- Species: E. anthriboides

Binomial name
- Ereis anthriboides (Pascoe, 1857)

Synonyms
- Eris anthriboides Pascoe, 1857

Species of beetle

Ereis anthriboides is a species of beetle in the family Cerambycidae. It was described by Francis Polkinghorne Pascoe in 1857. It is known from Sumatra and Malaysia.

== Subspecies ==
- Ereis anthriboides annamensis Breuning, 1967
- Ereis anthriboides anthriboides (Pascoe, 1857)
