= Elelea =

Scientific classification
- Kingdom: Animalia
- Phylum: Arthropoda
- Class: Insecta
- Order: Coleoptera
- Suborder: Polyphaga
- Infraorder: Cucujiformia
- Family: Cerambycidae
- Tribe: Mesosini
- Genus: Elelea

Genus of beetles

Elelea is a genus of longhorn beetles of the subfamily Lamiinae, containing the following species:

- Elelea concinna (Pascoe, 1857)
- Elelea multipunctata Heller, 1923
