= Mnemea =

Scientific classification
- Kingdom: Animalia
- Phylum: Arthropoda
- Class: Insecta
- Order: Coleoptera
- Suborder: Polyphaga
- Infraorder: Cucujiformia
- Family: Cerambycidae
- Tribe: Mesosini
- Genus: Mnemea

Genus of beetles

Mnemea is a genus of longhorn beetles of the subfamily Lamiinae, containing the following species:

- Mnemea javanica Breuning, 1939
- Mnemea laosensis Breuning, 1963
- Mnemea phalerata Pascoe, 1865
