= Planodes ambonensis =

Scientific classification
- Kingdom: Animalia
- Phylum: Arthropoda
- Class: Insecta
- Order: Coleoptera
- Suborder: Polyphaga
- Infraorder: Cucujiformia
- Family: Cerambycidae
- Genus: Planodes
- Species: P. ambonensis

Binomial name
- Planodes ambonensis Breuning & Chûjô, 1965

Species of beetle

Planodes ambonensis is a species of beetle in the family Cerambycidae. It was described by Stephan von Breuning and Chûjô in 1965.
