= Paraplanodes granulocostatus =

Scientific classification
- Kingdom: Animalia
- Phylum: Arthropoda
- Class: Insecta
- Order: Coleoptera
- Suborder: Polyphaga
- Infraorder: Cucujiformia
- Family: Cerambycidae
- Genus: Paraplanodes
- Species: P. granulocostatus

Binomial name
- Paraplanodes granulocostatus Heller, 1923

Species of beetle

Paraplanodes granulocostatus is a species of beetle in the family Cerambycidae. It was described by Heller in 1923.
