= Hypocacia shimomurai =

Scientific classification
- Kingdom: Animalia
- Phylum: Arthropoda
- Class: Insecta
- Order: Coleoptera
- Suborder: Polyphaga
- Infraorder: Cucujiformia
- Family: Cerambycidae
- Genus: Hypocacia
- Species: H. shimomurai

Binomial name
- Hypocacia shimomurai Holzschuh, 1989

Species of beetle

Hypocacia shimomurai is a species of beetle in the family Cerambycidae. It was described by Holzschuh in 1989. It is known from Taiwan.
