= Anagelasta lineifrons =

Scientific classification
- Domain: Eukaryota
- Kingdom: Animalia
- Phylum: Arthropoda
- Class: Insecta
- Order: Coleoptera
- Suborder: Polyphaga
- Infraorder: Cucujiformia
- Family: Cerambycidae
- Genus: Anagelasta
- Species: A. lineifrons

Binomial name
- Anagelasta lineifrons Gressitt, 1951

Species of beetle

Anagelasta lineifrons is a species of beetle in the family Cerambycidae. It was described by Gressitt in 1951. It is known from China.
