= Therippia triloba =

Scientific classification
- Kingdom: Animalia
- Phylum: Arthropoda
- Class: Insecta
- Order: Coleoptera
- Suborder: Polyphaga
- Infraorder: Cucujiformia
- Family: Cerambycidae
- Genus: Therippia
- Species: T. triloba

Binomial name
- Therippia triloba (Pascoe, 1859)

Synonyms
- Therippia (Paratherippia) triloba (Pascoe, 1859); Cacia triloba Pascoe, 1859

Species of beetle

Therippia triloba is a species of beetle in the family Cerambycidae. It was described by Francis Polkinghorne Pascoe in 1859, originally under the genus Cacia.
