= Paraplanodes =

Scientific classification
- Kingdom: Animalia
- Phylum: Arthropoda
- Class: Insecta
- Order: Coleoptera
- Suborder: Polyphaga
- Infraorder: Cucujiformia
- Family: Cerambycidae
- Tribe: Mesosini
- Genus: Paraplanodes

Genus of beetles

Paraplanodes is a genus of longhorn beetles of the subfamily Lamiinae, containing the following species:

- Paraplanodes granulocostatus Heller, 1923
- Paraplanodes simplicornis Heller, 1921
