= Metipocregyes nodieri =

Scientific classification
- Kingdom: Animalia
- Phylum: Arthropoda
- Class: Insecta
- Order: Coleoptera
- Suborder: Polyphaga
- Infraorder: Cucujiformia
- Family: Cerambycidae
- Genus: Metipocregyes
- Species: M. nodieri

Binomial name
- Metipocregyes nodieri (Pic, 1933)

Synonyms
- Mesosa nodieri Pic, 1933

Species of beetle

Metipocregyes nodieri is a species of beetle in the family Cerambycidae. It was described by Maurice Pic in 1933, originally under the genus Mesosa. It is known from Vietnam.
