= Paracoptops =

Scientific classification
- Kingdom: Animalia
- Phylum: Arthropoda
- Class: Insecta
- Order: Coleoptera
- Suborder: Polyphaga
- Infraorder: Cucujiformia
- Family: Cerambycidae
- Subfamily: Lamiinae
- Tribe: Mesosini
- Genus: Paracoptops; Aurivillius, 1926

Genus of beetles

Paracoptops is a genus of longhorn beetles of the subfamily Lamiinae, containing the following species:

- Paracoptops basalis (Pascoe, 1865)
- Paracoptops caledonica Breuning, 1942
- Paracoptops djampeanus Breuning, 1960
- Paracoptops isabellae Gilmour, 1947
- Paracoptops papuana Breuning, 1939
- Paracoptops toxopoei Aurivillius, 1926
