= Pseudochoeromorpha lar =

Scientific classification
- Kingdom: Animalia
- Phylum: Arthropoda
- Class: Insecta
- Order: Coleoptera
- Suborder: Polyphaga
- Infraorder: Cucujiformia
- Family: Cerambycidae
- Genus: Pseudochoeromorpha
- Species: P. lar

Binomial name
- Pseudochoeromorpha lar (Pascoe, 1865)

Synonyms
- Agelasta lar Pascoe, 1865; Agelasta sobrina Pascoe, 1865

Species of beetle

Pseudochoeromorpha lar is a species of beetle in the family Cerambycidae. It was described by Francis Polkinghorne Pascoe in 1865. It is known from Borneo.
