= Paracoptops basalis =

Scientific classification
- Kingdom: Animalia
- Phylum: Arthropoda
- Class: Insecta
- Order: Coleoptera
- Suborder: Polyphaga
- Infraorder: Cucujiformia
- Family: Cerambycidae
- Genus: Paracoptops
- Species: P. basalis

Binomial name
- Paracoptops basalis (Pascoe, 1865)

Synonyms
- Agelasta basalis Pascoe, 1865

Species of beetle

Paracoptops basalis is a species of beetle in the family Cerambycidae. It was described by Francis Polkinghorne Pascoe in 1865, originally under the genus Agelasta.
