= Zelota bryanti =

Scientific classification
- Kingdom: Animalia
- Phylum: Arthropoda
- Class: Insecta
- Order: Coleoptera
- Suborder: Polyphaga
- Infraorder: Cucujiformia
- Family: Cerambycidae
- Genus: Zelota
- Species: Z. bryanti

Binomial name
- Zelota bryanti Breuning, 1938

Species of beetle

Zelota bryanti is a beetle species belonging to the family Cerambycidae. It was first described by Stephan von Breuning in 1938 and is known to inhabit Borneo.
