= Planodes satelles =

Scientific classification
- Domain: Eukaryota
- Kingdom: Animalia
- Phylum: Arthropoda
- Class: Insecta
- Order: Coleoptera
- Suborder: Polyphaga
- Infraorder: Cucujiformia
- Family: Cerambycidae
- Genus: Planodes
- Species: P. satelles

Binomial name
- Planodes satelles Pascoe, 1865

Species of beetle

Planodes satelles is a species of beetle in the family Cerambycidae. It was described by Francis Polkinghorne Pascoe in 1865.
