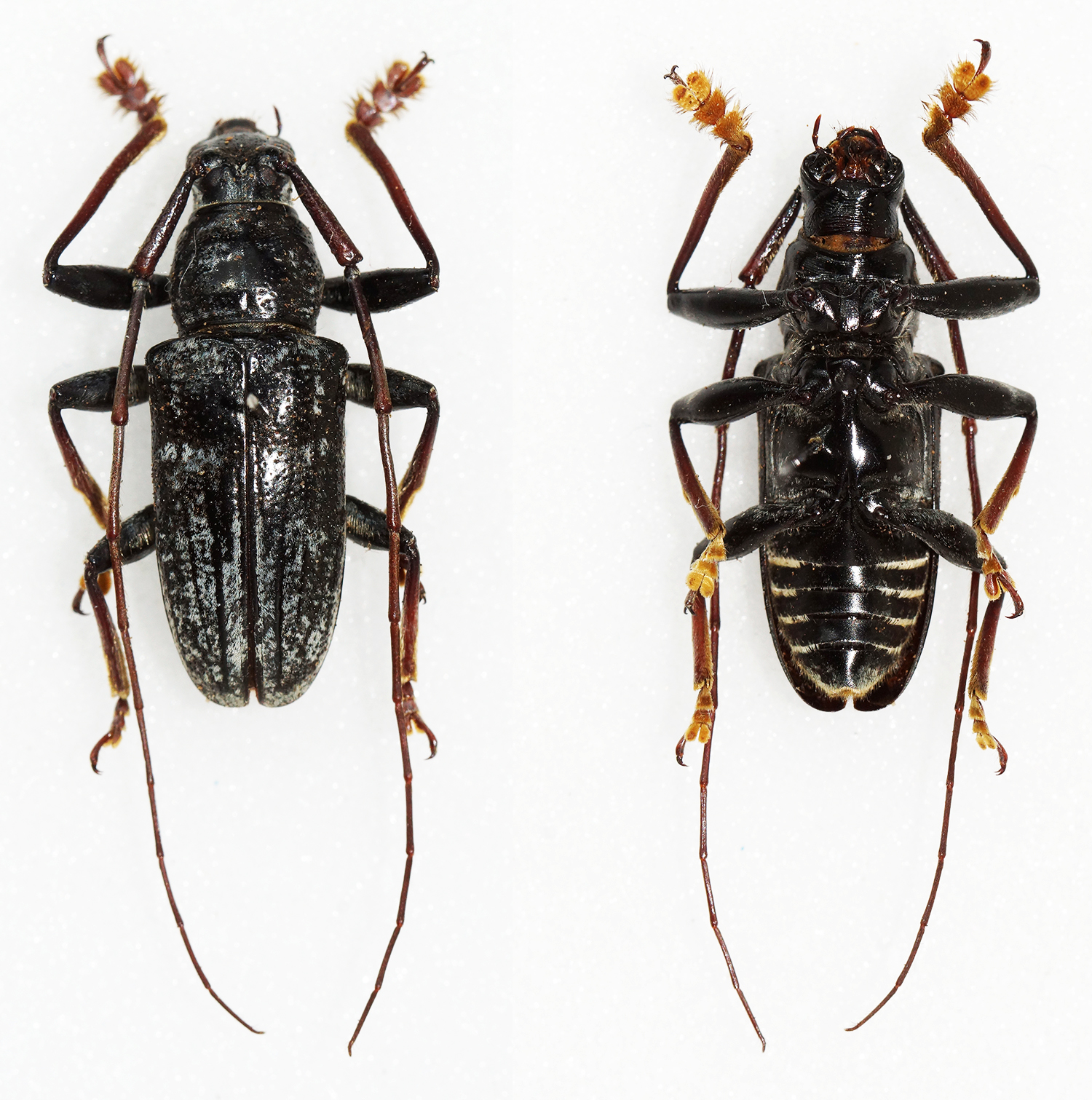
- Aemocia farinosa

Scientific classification
- Domain: Eukaryota
- Kingdom: Animalia
- Phylum: Arthropoda
- Class: Insecta
- Order: Coleoptera
- Suborder: Polyphaga
- Infraorder: Cucujiformia
- Family: Cerambycidae
- Tribe: Mesosini
- Genus: Aemocia; J. Thomson, 1864

= Aemocia =

Genus of beetles

Aemocia is a genus of longhorn beetles of the subfamily Lamiinae, containing the following species:

- Aemocia balteata Pascoe, 1865
- Aemocia borneana Breuning, 1974
- Aemocia farinosa Pascoe, 1865
- Aemocia griseomarmorata Breuning, 1970
- Aemocia ichthyosomoides Thomson, 1864
