= Therippia signata =

Scientific classification
- Kingdom: Animalia
- Phylum: Arthropoda
- Class: Insecta
- Order: Coleoptera
- Suborder: Polyphaga
- Infraorder: Cucujiformia
- Family: Cerambycidae
- Genus: Therippia
- Species: T. signata

Binomial name
- Therippia signata (Gahan, 1890)

Synonyms
- Cacia signata Gahan, 1890

Species of beetle

Therippia signata is a species of beetle in the family Cerambycidae. It was described by Charles Joseph Gahan in 1890, originally under the genus Cacia.
