= Ereis annulicornis =

Scientific classification
- Kingdom: Animalia
- Phylum: Arthropoda
- Class: Insecta
- Order: Coleoptera
- Suborder: Polyphaga
- Infraorder: Cucujiformia
- Family: Cerambycidae
- Genus: Ereis
- Species: E. annulicornis

Binomial name
- Ereis annulicornis (Pascoe, 1862)

Synonyms
- Eris annulicornis Pascoe, 1862

Species of beetle

Ereis annulicornis is a species of beetle in the family Cerambycidae. It was described by Francis Polkinghorne Pascoe in 1862. It is known from Cambodia.
