= Zelota =

Scientific classification
- Domain: Eukaryota
- Kingdom: Animalia
- Phylum: Arthropoda
- Class: Insecta
- Order: Coleoptera
- Suborder: Polyphaga
- Infraorder: Cucujiformia
- Family: Cerambycidae
- Tribe: Mesosini
- Genus: Zelota

Genus of beetles

Zelota is a genus of longhorn beetles of the subfamily Lamiinae, containing the following species:

- Zelota bryanti Breuning, 1938
- Zelota malaccensis Breuning, 1936
- Zelota spathomelina Gahan in Shelford, 1902
- Zelota sumatrana Breuning, 1938
