= Paragolsinda tonkinensis =

Scientific classification
- Kingdom: Animalia
- Phylum: Arthropoda
- Class: Insecta
- Order: Coleoptera
- Suborder: Polyphaga
- Infraorder: Cucujiformia
- Family: Cerambycidae
- Genus: Paragolsinda
- Species: P. tonkinensis

Binomial name
- Paragolsinda tonkinensis (Breuning, 1938)

Synonyms
- Mesoereis tonkinensis Breuning, 1938

Species of beetle

Paragolsinda tonkinensis is a species of beetle in the family Cerambycidae. It was described by Stephan von Breuning in 1938. It is known from Vietnam.
