= Mnemea phalerata =

Scientific classification
- Kingdom: Animalia
- Phylum: Arthropoda
- Class: Insecta
- Order: Coleoptera
- Suborder: Polyphaga
- Infraorder: Cucujiformia
- Family: Cerambycidae
- Genus: Mnemea
- Species: M. phalerata

Binomial name
- Mnemea phalerata Pascoe, 1865

Species of beetle

Mnemea phalerata is a species of beetle in the family Cerambycidae. It was described by Francis Polkinghorne Pascoe in 1865. It is known from Borneo and Malaysia.
