= Pseudoplanodes mindoroensis =

Scientific classification
- Kingdom: Animalia
- Phylum: Arthropoda
- Class: Insecta
- Order: Coleoptera
- Suborder: Polyphaga
- Infraorder: Cucujiformia
- Family: Cerambycidae
- Genus: Pseudoplanodes
- Species: P. mindoroensis

Binomial name
- Pseudoplanodes mindoroensis Breuning, 1945

Species of beetle

Pseudoplanodes mindoroensis is a species of beetle in the family Cerambycidae. It was described by Stephan von Breuning in 1945.
