= Paracoptops caledonica =

Scientific classification
- Kingdom: Animalia
- Phylum: Arthropoda
- Class: Insecta
- Order: Coleoptera
- Suborder: Polyphaga
- Infraorder: Cucujiformia
- Family: Cerambycidae
- Genus: Paracoptops
- Species: P. caledonica

Binomial name
- Paracoptops caledonica Breuning, 1942

Species of beetle

Paracoptops caledonica is a species of beetle in the family Cerambycidae. It was described by Stephan von Breuning in 1942.
