= Anipocregyes laosensis =

Scientific classification
- Kingdom: Animalia
- Phylum: Arthropoda
- Class: Insecta
- Order: Coleoptera
- Suborder: Polyphaga
- Infraorder: Cucujiformia
- Family: Cerambycidae
- Genus: Anipocregyes
- Species: A. laosensis

Binomial name
- Anipocregyes laosensis Breuning, 1964

Species of beetle

Anipocregyes laosensis is a species of beetle in the family Cerambycidae. It was described by Stephan von Breuning in 1964. It is known from Laos.
