= Planodes gebeensis =

Scientific classification
- Kingdom: Animalia
- Phylum: Arthropoda
- Class: Insecta
- Order: Coleoptera
- Suborder: Polyphaga
- Infraorder: Cucujiformia
- Family: Cerambycidae
- Genus: Planodes
- Species: P. gebeensis

Binomial name
- Planodes gebeensis Breuning, 1970

Species of beetle

Planodes gebeensis is a species of beetle in the family Cerambycidae. It was described by Stephan von Breuning in 1970.
