= Paragolsinda obscura =

Scientific classification
- Kingdom: Animalia
- Phylum: Arthropoda
- Class: Insecta
- Order: Coleoptera
- Suborder: Polyphaga
- Infraorder: Cucujiformia
- Family: Cerambycidae
- Genus: Paragolsinda
- Species: P. obscura

Binomial name
- Paragolsinda obscura (Matsushita, 1933)

Synonyms
- Mesoereis obscurus Matsushita, 1933

Species of beetle

Paragolsinda obscura is a species of beetle in the family Cerambycidae. It was described by Masaki Matsushita in 1933. It is known from Taiwan.
