= Pseudipocregyes =

Scientific classification
- Kingdom: Animalia
- Phylum: Arthropoda
- Class: Insecta
- Order: Coleoptera
- Suborder: Polyphaga
- Infraorder: Cucujiformia
- Family: Cerambycidae
- Tribe: Mesosini
- Genus: Pseudipocregyes

Genus of beetles

Pseudipocregyes is a genus of longhorn beetles of the subfamily Lamiinae, containing the following species:

- Pseudipocregyes albosignatus Breuning, 1974
- Pseudipocregyes fruhstorferi Breuning, 1968
- Pseudipocregyes maculatus Pic, 1923
