= Golsinda malaysiaca =

Scientific classification
- Kingdom: Animalia
- Phylum: Arthropoda
- Class: Insecta
- Order: Coleoptera
- Suborder: Polyphaga
- Infraorder: Cucujiformia
- Family: Cerambycidae
- Genus: Golsinda
- Species: G. malaysiaca

Binomial name
- Golsinda malaysiaca Yamasako & Makihara, 2011

Species of beetle

Golsinda malaysiaca is a species of beetle in the family Cerambycidae. It was first scientifically documented by Yamasako and Hiroshi Makihara in 2011. The Golsinda malaysiaca is known to be found in tropical forest areas around Malaysia.
