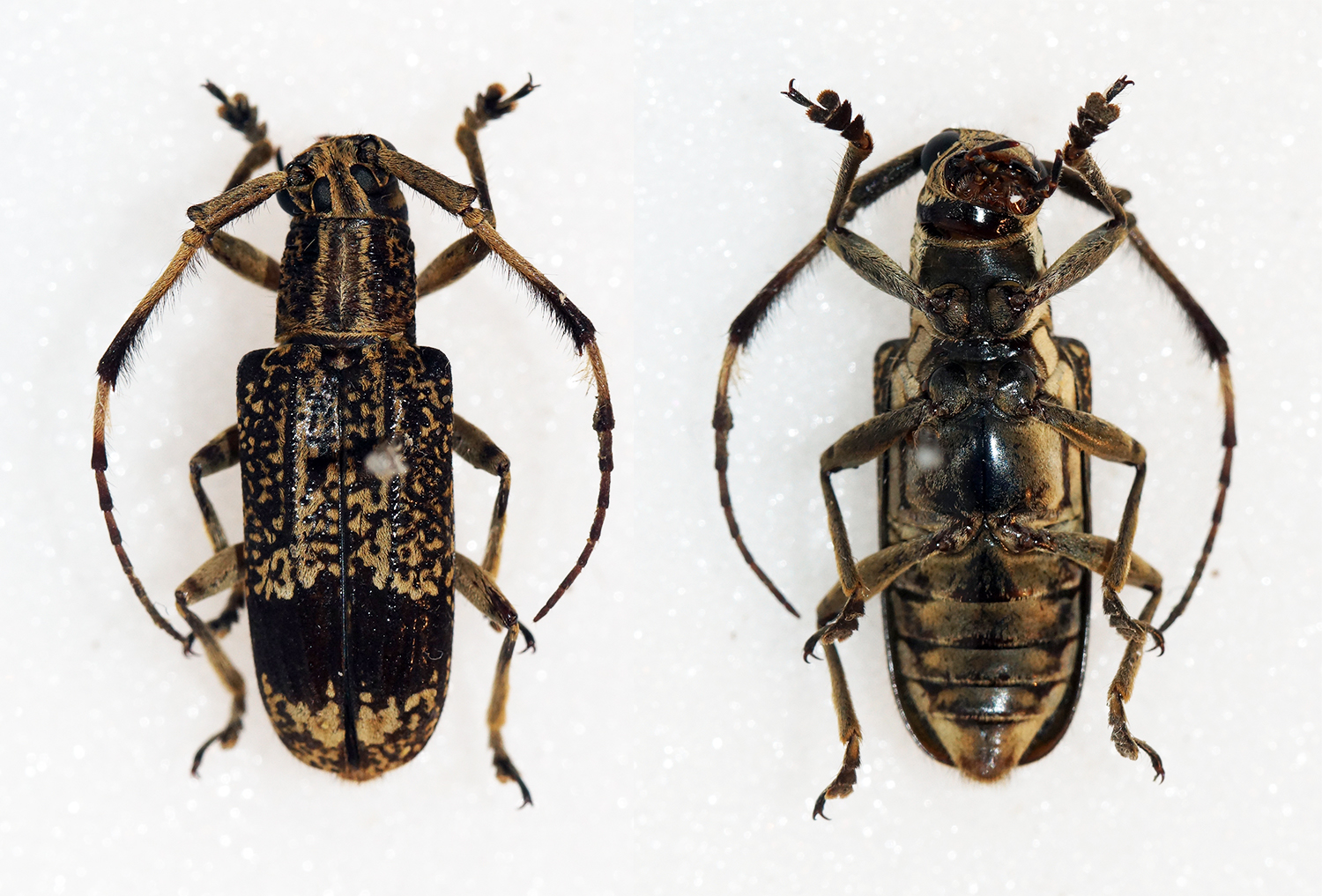

Scientific classification
- Kingdom: Animalia
- Phylum: Arthropoda
- Clade: Pancrustacea
- Class: Insecta
- Order: Coleoptera
- Suborder: Polyphaga
- Infraorder: Cucujiformia
- Family: Cerambycidae
- Genus: Planodes
- Species: P. denticornis

Binomial name
- Planodes denticornis (Chevrolat, 1858)

= Planodes denticornis =

Species of beetle

Planodes denticornis is a species of beetle in the family Cerambycidae. It was described by Louis Alexandre Auguste Chevrolat in 1858.
