= Microcacia =

Scientific classification
- Kingdom: Animalia
- Phylum: Arthropoda
- Class: Insecta
- Order: Coleoptera
- Suborder: Polyphaga
- Infraorder: Cucujiformia
- Family: Cerambycidae
- Tribe: Mesosini
- Genus: Microcacia

Genus of beetles

Microcacia is a genus of longhorn beetles of the subfamily Lamiinae, containing the following species:

- Microcacia albosignata Breuning, 1968
- Microcacia longiscapa Breuning, 1939
