= Anagelasta nigromaculata =

Scientific classification
- Kingdom: Animalia
- Phylum: Arthropoda
- Class: Insecta
- Order: Coleoptera
- Suborder: Polyphaga
- Infraorder: Cucujiformia
- Family: Cerambycidae
- Genus: Anagelasta
- Species: A. nigromaculata

Binomial name
- Anagelasta nigromaculata Breuning, 1938

Species of beetle

Anagelasta nigromaculata is a species of beetle in the family Cerambycidae. It was described by Stephan von Breuning in 1938. It is known from India.
