= Anipocregyes multifasciculatus =

Scientific classification
- Kingdom: Animalia
- Phylum: Arthropoda
- Class: Insecta
- Order: Coleoptera
- Suborder: Polyphaga
- Infraorder: Cucujiformia
- Family: Cerambycidae
- Genus: Anipocregyes
- Species: A. multifasciculatus

Binomial name
- Anipocregyes multifasciculatus Breuning, 1939

Species of beetle

Anipocregyes multifasciculatus is a species of beetle in the family Cerambycidae. It was described by Stephan von Breuning in 1939. It is known from Sumatra.
