= Planodes quaternarius =

Scientific classification
- Domain: Eukaryota
- Kingdom: Animalia
- Phylum: Arthropoda
- Class: Insecta
- Order: Coleoptera
- Suborder: Polyphaga
- Infraorder: Cucujiformia
- Family: Cerambycidae
- Genus: Planodes
- Species: P. quaternarius

Binomial name
- Planodes quaternarius Newman, 1842

Synonyms
- Planodes quaternaria Newman, 1842

Species of beetle

Planodes quaternarius is a species of beetle in the family Cerambycidae. It was described by Newman in 1842. It is known from the Philippines.

== Varietas ==
- Planodes quaternarius var. bimaculatus Aurivillius, 1927
- Planodes quaternarius var. evanescens Kriesche, 1936
- Planodes quaternarius var. schultzei Heller, 1913
