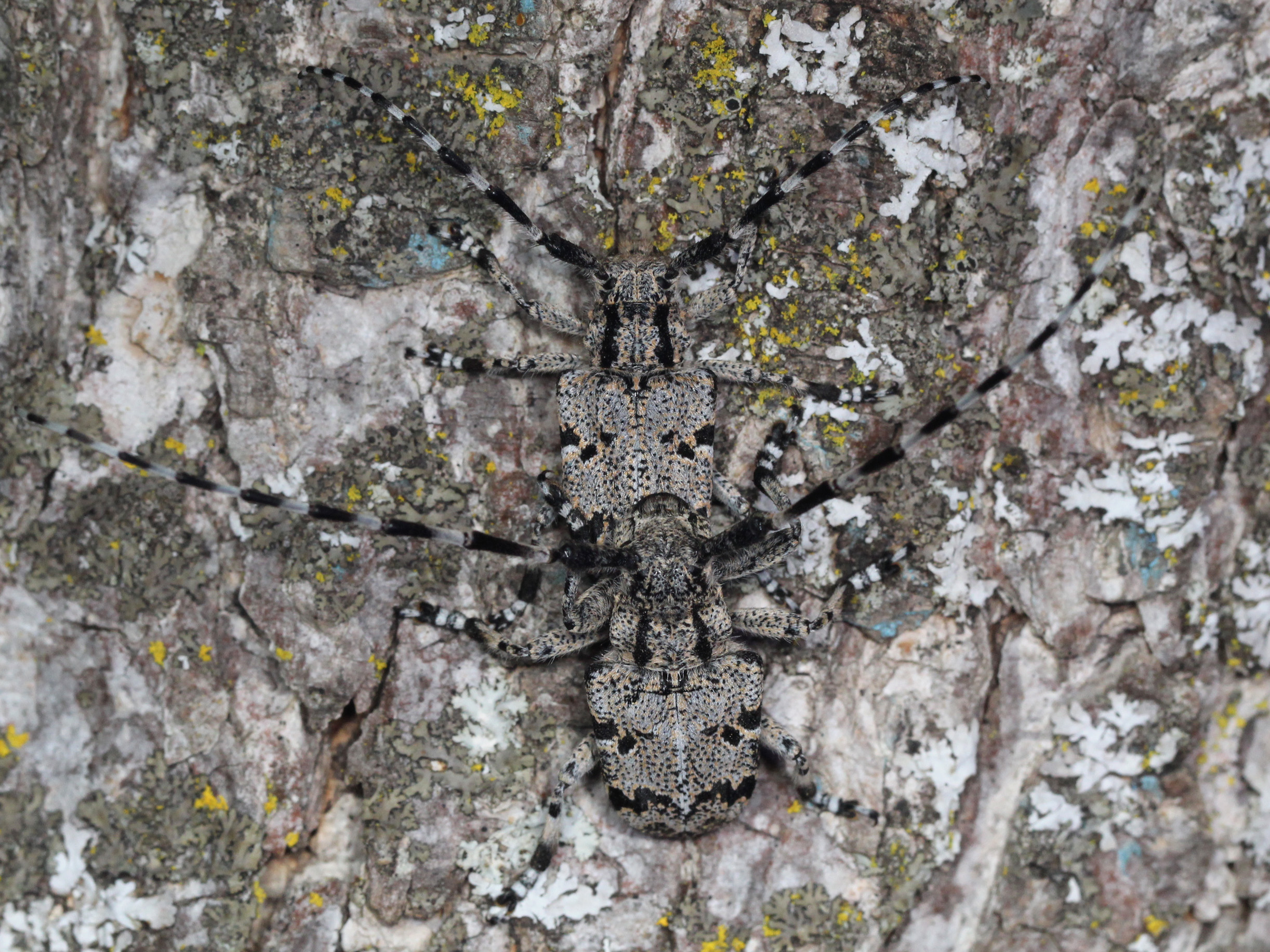
- Male and female

Scientific classification
- Kingdom: Animalia
- Phylum: Arthropoda
- Class: Insecta
- Order: Coleoptera
- Suborder: Polyphaga
- Infraorder: Cucujiformia
- Family: Cerambycidae
- Tribe: Mesosini
- Genus: Synaphaeta; Thomson, 1864
- Species: S. guexi

Binomial name
- Synaphaeta guexi (LeConte, 1852)

= Synaphaeta =

Genus of beetles

Synaphaeta is a monotypic beetle genus in the family Cerambycidae first described by Thomson in 1864. Its only species, Synaphaeta guexi (Also called the spotted tree borer), occurs in the Pacific states of North America, from British Columbia down to California. It has been reared from a variety of hardwood trees, including Pacific willow (Salix lasiandra), white alder (Alnus rhombifolia), coffeeberry (Frangula californica), English walnut (Juglans regia), and cherry (Prunus sp.). It was described by John Lawrence LeConte in 1852 based on a specimen from Benicia, California.
