= Therippia mediofasciata =

Scientific classification
- Kingdom: Animalia
- Phylum: Arthropoda
- Class: Insecta
- Order: Coleoptera
- Suborder: Polyphaga
- Infraorder: Cucujiformia
- Family: Cerambycidae
- Genus: Therippia
- Species: T. mediofasciata

Binomial name
- Therippia mediofasciata Breuning, 1935

Synonyms
- Therippia (Paratherippia) mediofasciata Breuning, 1935

Species of beetle

Therippia mediofasciata is a species of beetle in the family Cerambycidae. It was described by Stephan von Breuning in 1935.
