= Pseudipocregyes maculatus =

Scientific classification
- Kingdom: Animalia
- Phylum: Arthropoda
- Class: Insecta
- Order: Coleoptera
- Suborder: Polyphaga
- Infraorder: Cucujiformia
- Family: Cerambycidae
- Genus: Pseudipocregyes
- Species: P. maculatus

Binomial name
- Pseudipocregyes maculatus Pic, 1923

Synonyms
- Bulbipocregyes quadriplagiatus Breuning, 1965

Species of beetle

Pseudipocregyes maculatus is a species of beetle in the family Cerambycidae. It was described by Maurice Pic in 1923.
