= Pseudoplanodes aurivilliusi =

Scientific classification
- Kingdom: Animalia
- Phylum: Arthropoda
- Class: Insecta
- Order: Coleoptera
- Suborder: Polyphaga
- Infraorder: Cucujiformia
- Family: Cerambycidae
- Genus: Pseudoplanodes
- Species: P. aurivilliusi

Binomial name
- Pseudoplanodes aurivilliusi (Schwarzer, 1926)

Synonyms
- Planodes aurivilliusi Schwarzer, 1926; Pseudoplanodes mediofasciatus Breuning, 1935

Species of beetle

Pseudoplanodes aurivilliusi is a species of beetle in the family Cerambycidae. It was described by Bernhard Schwarzer in 1926.
