= Ereis distincta =

Scientific classification
- Kingdom: Animalia
- Phylum: Arthropoda
- Class: Insecta
- Order: Coleoptera
- Suborder: Polyphaga
- Infraorder: Cucujiformia
- Family: Cerambycidae
- Genus: Ereis
- Species: E. distincta

Binomial name
- Ereis distincta Pic, 1935

Species of beetle

Ereis distincta is a species of beetle in the family Cerambycidae. It was described by Maurice Pic in 1935. It is known to inhabit Vietnam.
