= Hypocacia =

Scientific classification
- Kingdom: Animalia
- Phylum: Arthropoda
- Class: Insecta
- Order: Coleoptera
- Suborder: Polyphaga
- Infraorder: Cucujiformia
- Family: Cerambycidae
- Tribe: Mesosini
- Genus: Hypocacia

Genus of beetles

Hypocacia is a genus of longhorn beetles of the subfamily Lamiinae, containing the following species:

- Hypocacia biplagiata Breuning, 1935
- Hypocacia shimomurai Holzschuh, 1989
