= Golsinda basicornis =

Scientific classification
- Kingdom: Animalia
- Phylum: Arthropoda
- Class: Insecta
- Order: Coleoptera
- Suborder: Polyphaga
- Infraorder: Cucujiformia
- Family: Cerambycidae
- Genus: Golsinda
- Species: G. basicornis

Binomial name
- Golsinda basicornis Gahan, 1894

Synonyms
- Mesocacia rugicollis Gressitt, 1940

Species of beetle

Golsinda basicornis is a species of beetle in the family Cerambycidae. It was described by Charles Joseph Gahan in 1894. It is known from Myanmar, China, Vietnam, Laos, and Thailand.
