= Silgonda =

Scientific classification
- Kingdom: Animalia
- Phylum: Arthropoda
- Class: Insecta
- Order: Coleoptera
- Suborder: Polyphaga
- Infraorder: Cucujiformia
- Family: Cerambycidae
- Genus: Silgonda
- Species: S. rufipes

Binomial name
- Silgonda rufipes Heller, 1924

Genus of beetles

Silgonda rufipes is a species of beetle in the family Cerambycidae, and the only species in the genus Silgonda. It was described by Heller in 1924.
