= Mimagelasta =

Scientific classification
- Kingdom: Animalia
- Phylum: Arthropoda
- Class: Insecta
- Order: Coleoptera
- Suborder: Polyphaga
- Infraorder: Cucujiformia
- Family: Cerambycidae
- Genus: Mimagelasta
- Species: M. grisescens

Binomial name
- Mimagelasta grisescens Breuning, 1939

Genus of beetles

Mimagelasta grisescens is a species of beetle in the family Cerambycidae, and the only species in the genus Mimagelasta. It was described by Stephan von Breuning in 1939.
