= Pseudocoptops =

Scientific classification
- Kingdom: Animalia
- Phylum: Arthropoda
- Class: Insecta
- Order: Coleoptera
- Suborder: Polyphaga
- Infraorder: Cucujiformia
- Family: Cerambycidae
- Genus: Pseudocoptops
- Species: P. seychellarum

Binomial name
- Pseudocoptops seychellarum Breuning, 1977

Genus of beetles

Pseudocoptops seychellarum is a species of beetle in the family Cerambycidae, and the only species in the genus Pseudocoptops. It was described by Stephan von Breuning in 1977.
