= Paraereis =

Scientific classification
- Kingdom: Animalia
- Phylum: Arthropoda
- Class: Insecta
- Order: Coleoptera
- Suborder: Polyphaga
- Infraorder: Cucujiformia
- Family: Cerambycidae
- Genus: Paraereis
- Species: P. javanica

Binomial name
- Paraereis javanica Breuning, 1938

Genus of beetles

Paraereis javanica is a species of beetle in the family Cerambycidae, and the only species in the genus Paraereis. It was described by Stephan von Breuning in 1938.
