= Trichomesosa =

Scientific classification
- Kingdom: Animalia
- Phylum: Arthropoda
- Class: Insecta
- Order: Coleoptera
- Suborder: Polyphaga
- Infraorder: Cucujiformia
- Family: Cerambycidae
- Genus: Trichomesosa
- Species: T. bifasciata

Binomial name
- Trichomesosa bifasciata (Pic, 1925)

Genus of beetles

Trichomesosa bifasciata is a species of beetle in the family Cerambycidae, and the only species in the genus Trichomesosa. It was described by Pic in 1925.
