= Epimesosa =

Scientific classification
- Kingdom: Animalia
- Phylum: Arthropoda
- Class: Insecta
- Order: Coleoptera
- Suborder: Polyphaga
- Infraorder: Cucujiformia
- Family: Cerambycidae
- Genus: Epimesosa
- Species: E. taliana

Binomial name
- Epimesosa taliana (Pic, 1917)

Genus of beetles

Epimesosa taliana is a species of beetle in the family Cerambycidae, and the only species in the genus Epimesosa. It was described by Maurice Pic in 1917.
