= Leptomesosa =

Scientific classification
- Kingdom: Animalia
- Phylum: Arthropoda
- Class: Insecta
- Order: Coleoptera
- Suborder: Polyphaga
- Infraorder: Cucujiformia
- Family: Cerambycidae
- Genus: Leptomesosa

Genus of beetles

Leptomesosa is a genus of longhorn beetles of the subfamily Lamiinae, containing the following species:

- Leptomesosa cephalotes (Pic, 1903)
- Leptomesosa langana (Pic, 1917)
- Leptomesosa minor Breuning, 1974
