= Mesoplanodes =

Scientific classification
- Kingdom: Animalia
- Phylum: Arthropoda
- Class: Insecta
- Order: Coleoptera
- Suborder: Polyphaga
- Infraorder: Cucujiformia
- Family: Cerambycidae
- Genus: Mesoplanodes
- Species: M. babyrussus

Binomial name
- Mesoplanodes babyrussus Yamasako & Ohbayashi, 2011

Genus of beetles

Mesoplanodes babyrussus is a species of beetle in the family Cerambycidae, and the only species in the genus Mesoplanodes. It was described by Yamasako and Ohbayashi in 2011.
