= Mimocacia =

Scientific classification
- Kingdom: Animalia
- Phylum: Arthropoda
- Class: Insecta
- Order: Coleoptera
- Suborder: Polyphaga
- Infraorder: Cucujiformia
- Family: Cerambycidae
- Genus: Mimocacia
- Species: M. ferruginea

Binomial name
- Mimocacia ferruginea Breuning, 1937

Genus of beetles

Mimocacia ferruginea is a species of beetle in the family Cerambycidae, and the only species in the genus Mimocacia. It was described by Stephan von Breuning in 1937.
