= Mimosaimia =

Scientific classification
- Kingdom: Animalia
- Phylum: Arthropoda
- Class: Insecta
- Order: Coleoptera
- Suborder: Polyphaga
- Infraorder: Cucujiformia
- Family: Cerambycidae
- Genus: Mimosaimia
- Species: M. fruhstorferi

Binomial name
- Mimosaimia fruhstorferi Breuning, 1971

Genus of beetles

Mimosaimia fruhstorferi is a species of beetle in the family Cerambycidae, and the only species in the genus Mimosaimia. It was described by Stephan von Breuning in 1971.
