= Mimanancylus =

Scientific classification
- Kingdom: Animalia
- Phylum: Arthropoda
- Class: Insecta
- Order: Coleoptera
- Suborder: Polyphaga
- Infraorder: Cucujiformia
- Family: Cerambycidae
- Genus: Mimanancylus
- Species: M. borneensis

Binomial name
- Mimanancylus borneensis Breuning, 1968

Genus of beetles

Mimanancylus borneensis is a species of beetle in the family Cerambycidae, and the only species in the genus Mimanancylus. It was described by Stephan von Breuning in 1968.
