= Liosynaphaeta =

Scientific classification
- Kingdom: Animalia
- Phylum: Arthropoda
- Class: Insecta
- Order: Coleoptera
- Suborder: Polyphaga
- Infraorder: Cucujiformia
- Family: Cerambycidae
- Genus: Liosynaphaeta
- Species: L. balloui

Binomial name
- Liosynaphaeta balloui Fisher, 1926

Genus of beetles

Liosynaphaeta balloui is a species of beetle in the family Cerambycidae, and the only species in the genus Liosynaphaeta. It was described by Fisher in 1926.
