= Syrrhopeus =

Scientific classification
- Kingdom: Animalia
- Phylum: Arthropoda
- Class: Insecta
- Order: Coleoptera
- Suborder: Polyphaga
- Infraorder: Cucujiformia
- Family: Cerambycidae
- Genu: Syrrhopeus
- Species: S. agelastoides

Binomial name
- Syrrhopeus agelastoides Pascoe, 1865

Genus of beetles

Syrrhopeus agelastoides is a species of beetle in the family Cerambycidae, and the only species in the genus Syrrhopeus. It was described by Pascoe in 1865.
