= Pseudoclyzomedus =

Scientific classification
- Kingdom: Animalia
- Phylum: Arthropoda
- Class: Insecta
- Order: Coleoptera
- Suborder: Polyphaga
- Infraorder: Cucujiformia
- Family: Cerambycidae
- Genus: Pseudoclyzomedus
- Species: P. ohbayashii

Binomial name
- Pseudoclyzomedus ohbayashii Yamasako, 2009

Genus of beetles

Pseudoclyzomedus ohbayashii is a species of beetle in the family Cerambycidae, and the only species in the genus Pseudoclyzomedus. It was described by Yamasako in 2009.
