= Falsocacia =

Scientific classification
- Kingdom: Animalia
- Phylum: Arthropoda
- Class: Insecta
- Order: Coleoptera
- Suborder: Polyphaga
- Infraorder: Cucujiformia
- Family: Cerambycidae
- Genus: Falsocacia
- Species: F. nigromaculata

Binomial name
- Falsocacia nigromaculata Pic, 1944

Genus of beetles

Falsocacia nigromaculata is a species of beetle in the family Cerambycidae, and the only species in the genus Falsocacia. It was described by Maurice Pic in 1944.
