= Paracaciella =

Scientific classification
- Kingdom: Animalia
- Phylum: Arthropoda
- Class: Insecta
- Order: Coleoptera
- Suborder: Polyphaga
- Infraorder: Cucujiformia
- Family: Cerambycidae
- Genus: Paracaciella
- Species: P. sumatrana

Binomial name
- Paracaciella sumatrana Breuning, 1969

Genus of beetles

Paracaciella sumatrana is a species of beetle in the family Cerambycidae, and the only species in the genus Paracaciella. It was described by Stephan von Breuning in 1969.
