= Ereis =

Scientific classification
- Kingdom: Animalia
- Phylum: Arthropoda
- Class: Insecta
- Order: Coleoptera
- Suborder: Polyphaga
- Infraorder: Cucujiformia
- Family: Cerambycidae
- Subfamily: Lamiinae
- Tribe: Mesosini
- Genus: Ereis; Pascoe, 1865

Genus of beetles

Ereis is a genus of longhorn beetles of the subfamily Lamiinae, containing the following species:

- Ereis annulicornis (Pascoe, 1862)
- Ereis anthriboides (Pascoe, 1857)
- Ereis distincta Pic, 1935
- Ereis javanica Breuning, 1936
- Ereis roseomaculata Breuning, 1968
- Ereis subfasciata Pic, 1925
- Ereis sumatrensis Gahan, 1907
