= Maribius =

Scientific classification
- Domain: Bacteria
- Kingdom: Pseudomonadati
- Phylum: Pseudomonadota
- Class: Alphaproteobacteria
- Order: Rhodobacterales
- Family: Rhodobacteraceae
- Genus: Maribius; Choi et al. 2007

Species
- Maribius bermudensis

Genus of bacteria

Maribius is a genus of bacteria in the family Rhodobacteraceae.
