= Primorskyibacter aestuariivivens =

Scientific classification
- Domain: Bacteria
- Kingdom: Pseudomonadati
- Phylum: Pseudomonadota
- Class: Alphaproteobacteria
- Order: Rhodobacterales
- Family: Rhodobacteraceae
- Genus: Primorskyibacter
- Species: P. aestuariivivens

Binomial name
- Primorskyibacter aestuariivivens Park et al. 2016

Type strain
- KCTC 52455, NBRC 112419, strain OITF-36

Species of bacterium

Primorskyibacter aestuariivivens is a Gram-negative, aerobic, non-spore-forming and motile bacterium from the genus of Primorskyibacter which has been isolated from tidal flat sediments from Oido in Korea.
