= Planktotalea =

Scientific classification
- Domain: Bacteria
- Kingdom: Pseudomonadati
- Phylum: Pseudomonadota
- Class: Alphaproteobacteria
- Order: Rhodobacterales
- Family: Rhodobacteraceae
- Genus: Planktotalea; Hahnke et al. 2012

Type species
- Planktotalea frisia

Species
- P. arctica P. frisia P. lamellibrachiae

Genus of bacteria

Planktotalea is a genus of bacteria from the family of Rhodobacteraceae.
