= Marinibacterium =

Scientific classification
- Domain: Bacteria
- Kingdom: Pseudomonadati
- Phylum: Pseudomonadota
- Class: Alphaproteobacteria
- Order: Rhodobacterales
- Family: Rhodobacteraceae
- Genus: Marinibacterium; Li et al. 2015

Type species
- Marinibacterium profundimaris

Species
- M. profundimaris

Genus of bacteria

Marinibacterium is a Gram-negative genus of bacteria from the family of Rhodobacteraceae with one known species (Marinibacterium profundimaris). Marinibacterium profundimaris has been isolated from deep seawater from the Atlantic Ocean.
