= Aliiroseovarius halocynthiae =

Scientific classification
- Domain: Bacteria
- Kingdom: Pseudomonadati
- Phylum: Pseudomonadota
- Class: Alphaproteobacteria
- Order: Rhodobacterales
- Family: Rhodobacteraceae
- Genus: Aliiroseovarius
- Species: A. halocynthiae

Binomial name
- Aliiroseovarius halocynthiae (Kim et al. 2012) Park et al. 2015

Synonyms
- Pseudoroseovarius halocynthiae, Roseovarius halocynthiae

Species of bacterium

Aliiroseovarius halocynthiae is a Gram-negative and motile bacterium from the genus of Aliiroseovarius which has been isolated from the sea squirt Halocynthia roretzi from the South Sea in Korea.
