= Psychromarinibacter =

Scientific classification
- Domain: Bacteria
- Kingdom: Pseudomonadati
- Phylum: Pseudomonadota
- Class: Alphaproteobacteria
- Order: Rhodobacterales
- Family: Rhodobacteraceae
- Genus: Psychromarinibacter; Qiao et al. 2017

Type species
- Psychromarinibacter halotolerans

Species
- P. halotolerans

Genus of bacteria

Psychromarinibacter is a Gram-negative, strictlyaerobic and motile genus of bacteria from the family of Rhodobacteraceae with one known species (Psychromarinibacter halotolerans). Psychromarinibacter halotolerans has been isolated from seawater from the Yellow Sea.
