= Gemmobacter lanyuensis =

Scientific classification
- Domain: Bacteria
- Kingdom: Pseudomonadati
- Phylum: Pseudomonadota
- Class: Alphaproteobacteria
- Order: Rhodobacterales
- Family: Rhodobacteraceae
- Genus: Gemmobacter
- Species: G. lanyuensis

Binomial name
- Gemmobacter lanyuensis Sheu et al. 2013

Type strain
- BCRC 80378, KCTC 23714, LMG 26667, Orc-4

Species of bacterium

Gemmobacter lanyuensis is a Gram-negative, facultatively anaerobic bacterium from the genus of Gemmobacter which has been isolated from a freshwater spring from Taiwan.
