= Yoonia =

Scientific classification
- Domain: Bacteria
- Kingdom: Pseudomonadati
- Phylum: Pseudomonadota
- Class: Alphaproteobacteria
- Order: Rhodobacterales
- Family: Rhodobacteraceae
- Genus: Yoonia; Wirth and Whitman 2018

Type species
- Yoonia vestfoldensis

Species
- Y. litorea Y. maricola Y. maritima Y. rosea Y. sediminilitoris Y. vestfoldensis

Genus of bacteria

Yoonia is a genus of bacteria from the family of Rhodobacteraceae. Yoonia is named after the microbiologist Jung-Hoon Yoon.
