= Limimaricola aestuariicola =

Scientific classification
- Domain: Bacteria
- Kingdom: Pseudomonadati
- Phylum: Pseudomonadota
- Class: Alphaproteobacteria
- Order: Rhodobacterales
- Family: Rhodobacteraceae
- Genus: Limimaricola
- Species: L. aestuariicola

Binomial name
- Limimaricola aestuariicola (Park et al. 2015) Wirth and Whitman 2018

Type strain
- KCTC 42135, J-TF4

Synonyms
- Loktanella aestuariicola Loktanella aestuariivita

Species of bacterium

Limimaricola aestuariicola is a Gram-negative, aerobic and non-motile bacterium from the genus of Limimaricola which has been isolated from tidal flat sediments from the South Sea in Korea.
