= Limimaricola pyoseonensis =

Yassine ben aouadi

Scientific classification
- Domain: Bacteria
- Kingdom: Pseudomonadati
- Phylum: Pseudomonadota
- Class: Alphaproteobacteria
- Order: Rhodobacterales
- Family: Rhodobacteraceae
- Genus: Limimaricola
- Species: L. pyoseonensis

Binomial name
- Limimaricola pyoseonensis ( Moon et al. 2010) Wirth and Whitman 2018

Type strain
- DSM 21424, KCTC 22372, strain JJM85

Synonyms
- Loktanella pyoseonensis

Species of bacterium

Limimaricola pyoseonensis is a Gram-negative, obligately halophilic, aerobic, heterotrophic, rod-shaped and motile bacterium from the genus of Limimaricola which has been isolated from sand from the beach from Pyoseon in Korea.
