= Tropicimonas aquimaris =

Scientific classification
- Domain: Bacteria
- Kingdom: Pseudomonadati
- Phylum: Pseudomonadota
- Class: Alphaproteobacteria
- Order: Rhodobacterales
- Family: Rhodobacteraceae
- Genus: Tropicimonas
- Species: T. aquimaris

Binomial name
- Tropicimonas aquimaris Oh et al. 2012

Type strain
- CCUG 60524, KCTC 23424

Synonyms
- Tropicimonas aquiaesta

Species of bacterium

Tropicimonas aquimaris is a Gram-negative, aerobic, rod-shaped and non-motile bacterium from the genus of Tropicimonas which has been isolated from seawater from the South Sea in Korea.
