= Defluviimonas alba =

Scientific classification
- Domain: Bacteria
- Kingdom: Pseudomonadati
- Phylum: Pseudomonadota
- Class: Alphaproteobacteria
- Order: Rhodobacterales
- Family: Rhodobacteraceae
- Genus: Defluviimonas
- Species: D. alba

Binomial name
- Defluviimonas alba Pan et al. 2015

Type strain
- CGMCC 1.12518, LMG 27406, b45, cai42

Species of bacterium

Defluviimonas alba is a Gram-negative and rod-shaped bacterium from the genus of Defluviimonas which has been isolated from water from the Xinjiang Oilfield in China.
