= Puniceibacterium confluentis =

Scientific classification
- Domain: Bacteria
- Kingdom: Pseudomonadati
- Phylum: Pseudomonadota
- Class: Alphaproteobacteria
- Order: Rhodobacterales
- Family: Rhodobacteraceae
- Genus: Puniceibacterium
- Species: P. confluentis

Binomial name
- Puniceibacterium confluentis Park et al. 2017

Type strain
- KCTC 52765, NBRC 112766

Species of bacterium

Puniceibacterium confluentis is a Gram-negative, aerobic and non-motile bacterium from the genus of Puniceibacterium which has been isolated from water near Jeju Island in Korea.
