= Arenibacterium =

Scientific classification
- Domain: Bacteria
- Kingdom: Pseudomonadati
- Phylum: Pseudomonadota
- Class: Alphaproteobacteria
- Order: Rhodobacterales
- Family: Rhodobacteraceae
- Genus: Arenibacterium; Baek et al. 2020

Type species
- Arenibacterium halophilum

Species
- A. arenosum; A. halophilum

Genus of bacteria

Arenibacterium is a bacterial genus from the family Rhodobacteraceae.
