= Pseudoruegeria haliotis =

Scientific classification
- Domain: Bacteria
- Kingdom: Pseudomonadati
- Phylum: Pseudomonadota
- Class: Alphaproteobacteria
- Order: Rhodobacterales
- Family: Rhodobacteraceae
- Genus: Pseudoruegeria
- Species: P. haliotis

Binomial name
- Pseudoruegeria haliotis Hyun et al. 2013

Type strain
- JCM 18872, KACC 17214, strain WM67

Species of bacterium

Pseudoruegeria haliotis is a Gram-negative, rod-shaped, aerobic and non-motile bacterium from the genus of Pseudoruegeria which has been isolated from the gut of an abalone (Haliotis discus hannai) from the coast of Jeju Island in Korea.
