= Shimia haliotis =

Scientific classification
- Domain: Bacteria
- Kingdom: Pseudomonadati
- Phylum: Pseudomonadota
- Class: Alphaproteobacteria
- Order: Rhodobacterales
- Family: Rhodobacteraceae
- Genus: Shimia
- Species: S. haliotis

Binomial name
- Shimia haliotis Hyun et al. 2013

Type strain
- DSM 28453, JCM 18870, KACC 17212

Species of bacterium

Shimia haliotis is a Gram-negative, rod-shaped and motile bacterium from the genus of Shimia which has been isolated from the intestinal tract of an abalone (Haliotis discus hannai) from the Jeju Island in Korea.
