= Pseudoruegeria =

Scientific classification
- Domain: Bacteria
- Kingdom: Pseudomonadati
- Phylum: Pseudomonadota
- Class: Alphaproteobacteria
- Order: Rhodobacterales
- Family: Rhodobacteraceae
- Genus: Pseudoruegeria; Yoon et al. 2007

Type species
- Pseudoruegeria aquimaris

Species
- P. aestuarii P. aquimaris P. haliotis P. indica P. insulae P. limi P. lutimaris P. marinistellae P. sabulilitoris

Genus of bacteria

Pseudoruegeria is a genus of bacteria from the family of Rhodobacteraceae.
