= Sedimentitalea nanhaiensis =

Scientific classification
- Domain: Bacteria
- Kingdom: Pseudomonadati
- Phylum: Pseudomonadota
- Class: Alphaproteobacteria
- Order: Rhodobacterales
- Family: Rhodobacteraceae
- Genus: Sedimentitalea
- Species: S. nanhaiensis

Binomial name
- Sedimentitalea nanhaiensis (Sun et al. 2010) Breider et al. 2014

Type strain
- CCTCC AB 208316, DSM 24252, LMG 24841, MCCC 1A04178, NH52F

Synonyms
- Leisingera nanhaiensis

Species of bacterium

Sedimentitalea nanhaiensis is a Gram-negative, rod-shaped, aerobic and motile bacterium from the genus of Sedimentitalea which has been isolated from sediments from the South China Sea in China.
