= Marinovum =

Scientific classification
- Domain: Bacteria
- Kingdom: Pseudomonadati
- Phylum: Pseudomonadota
- Class: Alphaproteobacteria
- Order: Rhodobacterales
- Family: Rhodobacteraceae
- Genus: Marinovum; Martens et al. 2006

Species
- Marinovum algicola

Genus of bacteria

Marinovum is a genus of bacteria in the family Rhodobacteraceae. Up to now there is only one species of this genus known (Marinovum algicola).
