= Gemmobacter nectariphilus =

Scientific classification
- Domain: Bacteria
- Kingdom: Pseudomonadati
- Phylum: Pseudomonadota
- Class: Alphaproteobacteria
- Order: Rhodobacterales
- Family: Rhodobacteraceae
- Genus: Gemmobacter
- Species: G. nectariphilus

Binomial name
- Gemmobacter nectariphilus (Tanaka et al. 2004) Chen et al. 2013

Type strain
- AST4, DSM 15620, JCM 11959, NBRC 100046

Synonyms
- Catellatibacterium nectariphilum Catellibacterium nectariphilum

Species of bacterium

Gemmobacter nectariphilus is a bacterium from the genus of Gemmobacter which has been isolated from activated sludge from Japan.
