= Albidovulum inexpectatum =

Scientific classification
- Domain: Bacteria
- Kingdom: Pseudomonadati
- Phylum: Pseudomonadota
- Class: Alphaproteobacteria
- Order: Rhodobacterales
- Family: Rhodobacteraceae
- Genus: Albidovulum
- Species: A. inexpectatum

Binomial name
- Albidovulum inexpectatum Albuquerque et al. 2003

Type strain
- ATCC BAA-387, DSM 12048, FPR-10

Synonyms
- Rhodovulum inexpectatum

Species of bacterium

Albidovulum inexpectatum is a thermophilic and strictly aerobic bacteria from the genus of Albidovulum which has been isolated from a marine hot spring from the Island of San Miquel.
