= Shimia abyssi =

Scientific classification
- Domain: Bacteria
- Kingdom: Pseudomonadati
- Phylum: Pseudomonadota
- Class: Alphaproteobacteria
- Order: Rhodobacterales
- Family: Rhodobacteraceae
- Genus: Shimia
- Species: S. abyssi

Binomial name
- Shimia abyssi (Nogi et al. 2016) Wirth and Whitman 2018

Type strain
- DSM 100673, JCM 30900

Synonyms
- Thalassobius abyssi

Species of bacterium

Shimia abyssi is a Gram-negative, rod-shaped, aerobic and non-motile bacterium from the genus of Shimia which has been isolated from sediments from the Sagami Bay in Japan.
