= Aestuariihabitans =

Scientific classification
- Domain: Bacteria
- Kingdom: Pseudomonadati
- Phylum: Pseudomonadota
- Class: Alphaproteobacteria
- Order: Rhodobacterales
- Family: Rhodobacteraceae
- Genus: Aestuariihabitans; Yoon et al. 2014

Type species
- Aestuariihabitans beolgyonensi

Species
- A. beolgyonensis

Genus of bacteria

Aestuariihabitans is a bacterial genus from the family of Rhodobacteraceae with one known species (Aestuariihabitans beolgyonensis).
