= Gemmobacter intermedius =

Scientific classification
- Domain: Bacteria
- Kingdom: Pseudomonadati
- Phylum: Pseudomonadota
- Class: Alphaproteobacteria
- Order: Rhodobacterales
- Family: Rhodobacteraceae
- Genus: Gemmobacter
- Species: G. intermedius

Binomial name
- Gemmobacter intermedius Kämpfer et al. 2015

Type strain
- CCM 8510, CIP 110795, LMG 28215

Species of bacterium

Gemmobacter intermedius is a Gram-negative, aerobic and non-motile bacterium from the genus of Gemmobacter which has been isolated from the choana of a white stork.
