= Actibacterium ureilyticum =

Scientific classification
- Domain: Bacteria
- Kingdom: Pseudomonadati
- Phylum: Pseudomonadota
- Class: Alphaproteobacteria
- Order: Rhodobacterales
- Family: Rhodobacteraceae
- Genus: Actibacterium
- Species: A. ureilyticum

Binomial name
- Actibacterium ureilyticum Lin et al. 2016

Type strain
- BCRC 80823, JCM 30681, strain LS-811

Species of bacterium

Actibacterium ureilyticum is a Gram-negative, aerobic and rod-shaped bacterium from the genus of Actibacterium with a polar flagella which has been isolated from seawater from the South China Sea in Taiwan.
