= Pseudaestuariivita =

Scientific classification
- Domain: Bacteria
- Kingdom: Pseudomonadati
- Phylum: Pseudomonadota
- Class: Alphaproteobacteria
- Order: Rhodobacterales
- Family: Rhodobacteraceae
- Genus: Pseudaestuariivita; Wirth and Whitman 2018

Type species
- Pseudaestuariivita atlantica

Species
- P. atlantica

Genus of bacteria

Pseudaestuariivita is a genus of bacteria from the family of Rhodobacteraceae with one known species (Pseudaestuariivita atlantica).
