= Limimaricola hongkongensis =

Scientific classification
- Domain: Bacteria
- Kingdom: Pseudomonadati
- Phylum: Pseudomonadota
- Class: Alphaproteobacteria
- Order: Rhodobacterales
- Family: Rhodobacteraceae
- Genus: Limimaricola
- Species: L. hongkongensis

Binomial name
- Limimaricola hongkongensis (Lau et al. 2004) Wirth and Whitman 2018

Type strain
- DSM 17492, JCM 12479, NRRL B-41039

Synonyms
- Loktanella hongkongensis

Species of bacterium

Limimaricola hongkongensis is a Gram-negative, non-spore-forming, short rod-shaped and non-motile bacterium from the genus of Limimaricola which has been isolated from biofilm from Hong Kong.
