= Albirhodobacter confluentis =

Scientific classification
- Domain: Bacteria
- Kingdom: Pseudomonadati
- Phylum: Pseudomonadota
- Class: Alphaproteobacteria
- Order: Rhodobacterales
- Family: Rhodobacteraceae
- Genus: Albirhodobacter
- Species: A. confluentis

Binomial name
- Albirhodobacter confluentis (Jung and Jeon 2017)Jung et al. 2018

Type strain
- S1-47, JCM 31536

Synonyms
- Albirhodobacter aestuarii

Species of bacterium

Albirhodobacter confluentis is a Gram-negative, strictly aerobic, moderately halophilic and non-motile bacterium from the genus of Albirhodobacter which has been isolated from estuary sediments from Korea.
