= Pseudooctadecabacter =

Scientific classification
- Domain: Bacteria
- Kingdom: Pseudomonadati
- Phylum: Pseudomonadota
- Class: Alphaproteobacteria
- Order: Rhodobacterales
- Family: Rhodobacteraceae
- Genus: Pseudooctadecabacter; Billerbeck et al. 2015

Type species
- Pseudooctadecabacter jejudonensis

Species
- P. jejudonensis

Genus of bacteria

Pseudooctadecabacter is a genus of bacteria from the family of Rhodobacteraceae with one known species (Pseudooctadecabacter jejudonensis).
