= Tabrizicola fusiformis =

Scientific classification
- Domain: Bacteria
- Kingdom: Pseudomonadati
- Phylum: Pseudomonadota
- Class: Alphaproteobacteria
- Order: Rhodobacterales
- Family: Rhodobacteraceae
- Genus: Tabrizicola
- Species: T. fusiformis

Binomial name
- Tabrizicola fusiformis Ko et al. 2018

Type strain
- KCTC 62105, NBRC 113021, SY72

Species of bacterium

Tabrizicola fusiformis is a Gram-negative, aerobic, fusiform-shaped and motile bacterium from the genus of Tabrizicola which has been isolated from activated sludge from an industrial wastewater treatment plant.
