= Marivivens donghaensis =

Scientific classification
- Domain: Bacteria
- Kingdom: Pseudomonadati
- Phylum: Pseudomonadota
- Class: Alphaproteobacteria
- Order: Rhodobacterales
- Family: Rhodobacteraceae
- Genus: Marivivens
- Species: M. donghaensis

Binomial name
- Marivivens donghaensis Park et al. 2016

Type strain
- CECT 8947, KCTC 42776, strain AM-4

Species of bacterium

Marivivens donghaensis is a Gram-negative and aerobic bacterium from the genus of Marivivens which has been isolated from seawater from the Sea of Japan in Korea.
