= Thalassococcus lentus =

Scientific classification
- Domain: Bacteria
- Kingdom: Pseudomonadati
- Phylum: Pseudomonadota
- Class: Alphaproteobacteria
- Order: Rhodobacterales
- Family: Rhodobacteraceae
- Genus: Thalassococcus
- Species: T. lentus

Binomial name
- Thalassococcus lentus Park et al. 2013

Type strain
- CCUG 62791, KCTC 32084, YCS-24

Species of bacterium

Thalassococcus lentus is a Gram-negative and non-motile bacterium from the genus of Thalassococcus which has been isolated from seawater from a seaweed farm from the South Sea in Korea.
