= Boseongicola =

Scientific classification
- Domain: Bacteria
- Kingdom: Pseudomonadati
- Phylum: Pseudomonadota
- Class: Alphaproteobacteria
- Order: Rhodobacterales
- Family: Rhodobacteraceae
- Genus: Boseongicola; Park et al. 2014

Type species
- Boseongicola aestuarii

Species
- B. aestuarii

Genus of bacteria

Boseongicola is a Gram-negative and aerobic genus of bacteria from the family of Rhodobacteraceae with one known species (Boseongicola aestuarii). Boseongicola aestuarii has been isolated from tidal flat sediments from Boseong in Korea.
