= Aliiroseovarius pelagivivens =

Scientific classification
- Domain: Bacteria
- Kingdom: Pseudomonadati
- Phylum: Pseudomonadota
- Class: Alphaproteobacteria
- Order: Rhodobacterales
- Family: Rhodobacteraceae
- Genus: Aliiroseovarius
- Species: A. pelagivivens

Binomial name
- Aliiroseovarius pelagivivens Park et al. 2015

Type strain
- CECT 8811, KCTC 42459, strain GYSW-22

Synonyms
- Aliroseovarius pelagivivens

Species of bacterium

Aliiroseovarius pelagivivens is a Gram-negative, aerobic and non-motile bacterium from the genus of Aliiroseovarius which has been isolated from seawater from the Geoje Island in Korea.
