= Aestuariibius =

Scientific classification
- Domain: Bacteria
- Kingdom: Pseudomonadati
- Phylum: Pseudomonadota
- Class: Alphaproteobacteria
- Order: Rhodobacterales
- Family: Rhodobacteraceae
- Genus: Aestuariibius; Park et al. 2018

Type species
- Aestuariibius insulae

Species
- A. insulae

Genus of bacteria

Aestuariibius is a Gram-negative genus of bacteria from the family of Rhodobacteraceae with one known species (Aestuariibius insulae). Aestuariibius insulae has been isolated from a tidal flat sediments from the Yellow Sea in Korea.
