= Maliponia =

Scientific classification
- Domain: Bacteria
- Kingdom: Pseudomonadati
- Phylum: Pseudomonadota
- Class: Alphaproteobacteria
- Order: Rhodobacterales
- Family: Rhodobacteraceae
- Genus: Maliponia; Jung et al. 2016

Type species
- Maliponia aquimaris

Species
- M. aquimaris

Genus of bacteria

Maliponia is a Gram-negative bacterial genus from the family of Rhodobacteraceae with one known species (Maliponia aquimaris). Maliponia aquimaris has been isolated from seawater.
