= Roseibaca =

Scientific classification
- Domain: Bacteria
- Kingdom: Pseudomonadati
- Phylum: Pseudomonadota
- Class: Alphaproteobacteria
- Order: Rhodobacterales
- Family: Rhodobacteraceae
- Genus: Roseibaca; Labrenz et al. 2009

Type species
- Roseibaca ekhonensis

Species
- R. calidilacus R. ekhonensis

Genus of bacteria

Roseibaca is a genus of bacteria from the family of Rhodobacteraceae.
