= Lentibacter =

Scientific classification
- Domain: Bacteria
- Kingdom: Pseudomonadati
- Phylum: Pseudomonadota
- Class: Alphaproteobacteria
- Order: Rhodobacterales
- Family: Rhodobacteraceae
- Genus: Lentibacter; Li et al. 2012

Type species
- Lentibacter algarum

Species
- L. algarum

Genus of bacteria

Lentibacter is a Gram-negative and aerobic genus of bacteria from the family of Rhodobacteraceae with one known species (Lentibacter algarum). Lentibacter algarum has been isolated from the algae Enteromorpha prolifera from Qingdao in China.
