= Pseudoroseicyclus =

Scientific classification
- Domain: Bacteria
- Kingdom: Pseudomonadati
- Phylum: Pseudomonadota
- Class: Alphaproteobacteria
- Order: Rhodobacterales
- Family: Rhodobacteraceae
- Genus: Pseudoroseicyclus; Park et al. 2016

Type species
- Pseudoroseicyclus aestuarii

Species
- P. aestuarii

Genus of bacteria

Pseudoroseicyclus is a Gram-negative, aerobic and non-motile genus of bacteria from the family of Rhodobacteraceae with one known species (Pseudoroseicyclus aestuarii). Pseudoroseicyclus aestuarii has been isolated from tidal flat sediments from the Yellow Sea in Korea.
