= Gemmobacter aquaticus =

Scientific classification
- Domain: Bacteria
- Kingdom: Pseudomonadati
- Phylum: Pseudomonadota
- Class: Alphaproteobacteria
- Order: Rhodobacterales
- Family: Rhodobacteraceae
- Genus: Gemmobacter
- Species: G. aquaticus

Binomial name
- Gemmobacter aquaticus (Liu et al. 2010) Chen et al. 2013

Type strain
- CGMCC 1.7029, A1-9

Synonyms
- Catellibacterium aquatile

Species of bacterium

Gemmobacter aquaticus is a Gram-negative, rod-shaped, non-spore-forming and motile bacterium from the genus of Gemmobacter with a single polar flagellum which has been isolated from water from the Daqing reservoir in China.
