= Aliiroseovarius sediminilitoris =

Scientific classification
- Domain: Bacteria
- Kingdom: Pseudomonadati
- Phylum: Pseudomonadota
- Class: Alphaproteobacteria
- Order: Rhodobacterales
- Family: Rhodobacteraceae
- Genus: Aliiroseovarius
- Species: A. sediminilitoris

Binomial name
- Aliiroseovarius sediminilitoris (Park and Yoon 2013) Park et al. 2015

Type strain
- CCUG 62413, DSM 29439, KCTC 23959, strain M-M10

Synonyms
- Pseudoroseovarius sediminilitoris, Roseovarius sediminilitoris

Species of bacterium

Aliiroseovarius sediminilitoris is a Gram-negative and motile bacterium from the genus of Aliiroseovarius which has been isolated from sediments from the South Sea from Geoje island in Korea.
