= Thalassococcus halodurans =

Scientific classification
- Domain: Bacteria
- Kingdom: Pseudomonadati
- Phylum: Pseudomonadota
- Class: Alphaproteobacteria
- Order: Rhodobacterales
- Family: Rhodobacteraceae
- Genus: Thalassococcus
- Species: T. halodurans

Binomial name
- Thalassococcus halodurans Lee et al. 2007

Type strain
- DSM 26915, JCM 13833, NRRL B-41465

Species of bacterium

Thalassococcus halodurans is a Gram-negative, strictly aerobic and halotolerant bacterium from the genus of Thalassococcus which has been isolated from the sponge Halichondria panicea from the Friday Harbor in the United States.
