= Halocynthiibacter =

Scientific classification
- Domain: Bacteria
- Kingdom: Pseudomonadati
- Phylum: Pseudomonadota
- Class: Alphaproteobacteria
- Order: Rhodobacterales
- Family: Rhodobacteraceae
- Genus: Halocynthiibacter; Kim et al. 2014

Type species
- Halocynthiibacter namhaensis

Species
- H. arcticus H. namhaensis

Genus of bacteria

Halocynthiibacter is a genus of bacteria in the family Rhodobacteraceae.
