= Roseivivax =

Scientific classification
- Domain: Bacteria
- Kingdom: Pseudomonadati
- Phylum: Pseudomonadota
- Class: Alphaproteobacteria
- Order: Rhodobacterales
- Family: Rhodobacteraceae
- Genus: Roseivivax; Suzuki et al. 1999

Species
- Roseivivax halodurans Suzuki et al. 1999; Roseivivax halotolerans Suzuki et al. 1999; Roseivivax isoporae Chen et al. 2012; Roseivivax jejudonensis Jung et al. 2015; Roseivivax lentus Park et al. 2010; Roseivivax marinus Dai et al. 2014; Roseivivax sediminis Xiao et al. 2012

Genus of bacteria

Roseivivax is a genus of bacteria in the family Rhodobacteraceae.
