= Nioella ostreopsis =

Scientific classification
- Domain: Bacteria
- Kingdom: Pseudomonadati
- Phylum: Pseudomonadota
- Class: Alphaproteobacteria
- Order: Rhodobacterales
- Family: Rhodobacteraceae
- Genus: Nioella
- Species: N. ostreopsis

Binomial name
- Nioella ostreopsis Yang et al. 2020

Type strain
- Z7-4

Species of bacterium

Nioella ostreopsis is a Gram-negative, short-rod-shaped, strictly aerobic and non-motile bacterium in the genus of Nioella which has been isolated from the dinoflagellate Ostreopsis lenticularis.
