= Shimia thalassica =

Scientific classification
- Domain: Bacteria
- Kingdom: Pseudomonadati
- Phylum: Pseudomonadota
- Class: Alphaproteobacteria
- Order: Rhodobacterales
- Family: Rhodobacteraceae
- Genus: Shimia
- Species: S. thalassica

Binomial name
- Shimia thalassica Arahal et al. 2019

Type strain
- CECT 7735

Species of bacterium

Shimia thalassica is a Gram-negative, mesophilic, slightly halophilic aerobic and non-motile bacterium from the genus of Shimia which has been isolated from coastal seawater from Valencia in Spain.
