= Pacificibacter =

Scientific classification
- Domain: Bacteria
- Kingdom: Pseudomonadati
- Phylum: Pseudomonadota
- Class: Alphaproteobacteria
- Order: Rhodobacterales
- Family: Rhodobacteraceae
- Genus: Pacificibacter; Romanenko et al. 2011

Type species
- Pacificibacter maritimus

Species
- P. aestuarii P. marinus P. maritimus

Genus of bacteria

Pacificibacter is a genus of bacteria from the family of Rhodobacteraceae.
