= Lutimaribacter =

Scientific classification
- Domain: Bacteria
- Kingdom: Pseudomonadati
- Phylum: Pseudomonadota
- Class: Alphaproteobacteria
- Order: Rhodobacterales
- Family: Rhodobacteraceae
- Genus: Lutimaribacter; Yoon et al. 2009

Type species
- Lutimaribacter saemankumensis

Species
- L. litoralis L. marinistellae L. pacificus L. saemankumensis

Genus of bacteria

Lutimaribacter is a genus of bacteria from the family of Rhodobacteraceae.
