= Actibacterium mucosum =

Scientific classification
- Domain: Bacteria
- Kingdom: Pseudomonadati
- Phylum: Pseudomonadota
- Class: Alphaproteobacteria
- Order: Rhodobacterales
- Family: Rhodobacteraceae
- Genus: Actibacterium
- Species: A. mucosum

Binomial name
- Actibacterium mucosum Lucena et al. 2012

Type strain
- CECT 7668, KCTC 23349, strain R46

Synonyms
- Actaebacterium mucosus

Species of bacterium

Actibacterium mucosum is a chemoorganotrophic, aerobic and slightly halophilic bacterium from the genus of Actibacterium which has been isolated from water from the beach of Malvarrosa in Spain.
