= Pseudoseohaeicola =

Scientific classification
- Domain: Bacteria
- Kingdom: Pseudomonadati
- Phylum: Pseudomonadota
- Class: Alphaproteobacteria
- Order: Rhodobacterales
- Family: Rhodobacteraceae
- Genus: Pseudoseohaeicola; Park et al. 2015

Type species
- Pseudoseohaeicola caenipelagi

Species
- P. caenipelagi

Genus of Alphaproteobacteria

Pseudoseohaeicola is a Gram-negative, aerobic, pleomorphic and non-motile genus of bacteria from the family of Rhodobacteraceae with one known species (Pseudoseohaeicola caenipelagi). Pseudoseohaeicola caenipelagi has been isolated from tidal flat sediments from the South Sea in Korea.
