= Gemmobacter straminiformis =

Scientific classification
- Domain: Bacteria
- Kingdom: Pseudomonadati
- Phylum: Pseudomonadota
- Class: Alphaproteobacteria
- Order: Rhodobacterales
- Family: Rhodobacteraceae
- Genus: Gemmobacter
- Species: G. straminiformis

Binomial name
- Gemmobacter straminiformis Kang et al. 2017

Type strain
- JCM 31905, KACC 19224, strain CAM-8

Species of bacterium

Gemmobacter straminiformis is a Gram-negative, facultative anaerobic bacterium from the genus of Gemmobacter which has been isolated from an artificial fountain from the Chonbuk National University in Korea.
