= Gemmobacter caeni =

Scientific classification
- Domain: Bacteria
- Kingdom: Pseudomonadati
- Phylum: Pseudomonadota
- Class: Alphaproteobacteria
- Order: Rhodobacterales
- Family: Rhodobacteraceae
- Genus: Gemmobacter
- Species: G. caeni

Binomial name
- Gemmobacter caeni (Zheng et al. 2011) Chen et al. 2013

Type strain
- CGMCC 1.7745, DCA-1, DSM 21823

Synonyms
- Catellibacterium caeni

Species of bacterium

Gemmobacter caeni is a Gram-negative, rod-shaped, non-spore-forming, strictly aerobic and motile bacterium from the genus of Gemmobacter which has been isolated from activated sludge from a butachlor waste water treatment system in Nantong in China.
