= Shimia isoporae =

Scientific classification
- Domain: Bacteria
- Kingdom: Pseudomonadati
- Phylum: Pseudomonadota
- Class: Alphaproteobacteria
- Order: Rhodobacterales
- Family: Rhodobacteraceae
- Genus: Shimia
- Species: S. isoporae

Binomial name
- Shimia isoporae Chen et al. 2011

Type strain
- BCRC 80085, LMG 25377, SW6

Species of bacterium

Shimia isoporae is a Gram-negative, rod-shaped, aerobic and motile bacterium from the genus of Shimia which has been isolated from the coral Isopora palifera from Taiwan.
