= Celeribacter neptunius =

Scientific classification
- Domain: Bacteria
- Kingdom: Pseudomonadati
- Phylum: Pseudomonadota
- Class: Alphaproteobacteria
- Order: Rhodobacterales
- Family: Rhodobacteraceae
- Genus: Celeribacter
- Species: C. neptunius

Binomial name
- Celeribacter neptunius Ivanova et al. 2010

Type strain
- CIP 109922, DSM 26471, KMM 6012, strain H 14

Species of bacterium

Celeribacter neptunius is a Gram-negative, aerobic and motile bacterium from the genus of Celeribacter which has been isolated from seawater from the Tasman Sea in Australia.
