= Gemmobacter tilapiae =

Scientific classification
- Domain: Bacteria
- Kingdom: Pseudomonadati
- Phylum: Pseudomonadota
- Class: Alphaproteobacteria
- Order: Rhodobacterales
- Family: Rhodobacteraceae
- Genus: Gemmobacter
- Species: G. tilapiae

Binomial name
- Gemmobacter tilapiae Sheu et al. 2013

Type strain
- BCRC 80261, KCTC 23310, strain Ruye-53

Species of bacterium

Gemmobacter tilapiae is a Gram-negative, rod-shaped, aerobic and non-motile bacterium from the genus of Gemmobacter which has been isolated from a freshwater pond in Taiwan.
