= Gemmobacter nanjingensis =

Scientific classification
- Domain: Bacteria
- Kingdom: Pseudomonadati
- Phylum: Pseudomonadota
- Class: Alphaproteobacteria
- Order: Rhodobacterales
- Family: Rhodobacteraceae
- Genus: Gemmobacter
- Species: G. nanjingensis

Binomial name
- Gemmobacter nanjingensis (Zhang et al. 2012) Chen et al. 2013

Type strain
- CCTCC AB 2010218, Y12

Synonyms
- Catellibacterium nanjingense, Catellibacterium nanjingensis

Species of bacterium

Gemmobacter nanjingensis is a Gram-negative, non-spore-forming, facultatively anaerobic, propanil-degrading and rod-shaped bacterium from the genus of Gemmobacter which has been isolated from activated sludge.
