= Planktotalea lamellibrachiae =

Scientific classification
- Domain: Bacteria
- Kingdom: Pseudomonadati
- Phylum: Pseudomonadota
- Class: Alphaproteobacteria
- Order: Rhodobacterales
- Family: Rhodobacteraceae
- Genus: Planktotalea
- Species: P. lamellibrachiae

Binomial name
- Planktotalea lamellibrachiae Nogi et al. 2017

Type strain
- DSM 104669, JCM 31859, JAM 119

Species of bacterium

Planktotalea lamellibrachiae is a Gram-negative, aerobic, non-spore-forming and rod-shaped bacterium from the genus of Planktotalea which has been isolated from a tubeworm from Kagoshima Bay in Japan.
