= Puniceibacterium sediminis =

Scientific classification
- Domain: Bacteria
- Kingdom: Pseudomonadati
- Phylum: Pseudomonadota
- Class: Alphaproteobacteria
- Order: Rhodobacterales
- Family: Rhodobacteraceae
- Genus: Puniceibacterium
- Species: P. sediminis

Binomial name
- Puniceibacterium sediminis Zhang et al. 2015

Type strain
- DSM 29052, LMG 28384

Species of bacterium

Puniceibacterium sediminis is a gram-negative and rod-shaped bacterium from the genus of Puniceibacterium which has been isolated from sediments from the Sakhalin Island in Russia.
