= Falsirhodobacter halotolerans =

Scientific classification
- Domain: Bacteria
- Kingdom: Pseudomonadati
- Phylum: Pseudomonadota
- Class: Alphaproteobacteria
- Order: Rhodobacterales
- Family: Rhodobacteraceae
- Genus: Falsirhodobacter
- Species: F. halotolerans

Binomial name
- Falsirhodobacter halotolerans Subhash et al. 2013

Type strain
- KCTC 32158, NBRC 108897, JA744, JA745

Species of bacterium

Falsirhodobacter halotolerans is a Gram-negative bacteria bacterium from the genus of Falsirhodobacter which has been isolated from soil from a solar saltern from Humma in India.
