= Pseudoruegeria aquimaris =

Scientific classification
- Domain: Bacteria
- Kingdom: Pseudomonadati
- Phylum: Pseudomonadota
- Class: Alphaproteobacteria
- Order: Rhodobacterales
- Family: Rhodobacteraceae
- Genus: Pseudoruegeria
- Species: P. aquimaris

Binomial name
- Pseudoruegeria aquimaris Yoon et al. 2007

Type strain
- JCM 13603, KCTC 12737, strain SW-255

Species of bacterium

Pseudoruegeria aquimaris is a Gram-negative, rod-shaped and non-motile bacterium from the genus of Pseudoruegeria which has been isolated from seawater from the coast of Hwajinpo from the Sea of Japan in Korea.
