= Pseudoruegeria insulae =

Scientific classification
- Domain: Bacteria
- Kingdom: Pseudomonadati
- Phylum: Pseudomonadota
- Class: Alphaproteobacteria
- Order: Rhodobacterales
- Family: Rhodobacteraceae
- Genus: Pseudoruegeria
- Species: P. insulae

Binomial name
- Pseudoruegeria insulae Park et al. 2018

Type strain
- KACC 19614, KCTC 62422, NBRC 113188, strain BPTF-M20

Species of bacterium

Pseudoruegeria insulae is a Gram-negative, aerobic and non-motil bacterium from the genus of Pseudoruegeria which has been isolated from tidal flat sediments from the Yellow Sea in Korea.
