= Neptunicoccus =

Scientific classification
- Domain: Bacteria
- Kingdom: Pseudomonadati
- Phylum: Pseudomonadota
- Class: Alphaproteobacteria
- Order: Rhodobacterales
- Family: Rhodobacteraceae
- Genus: Neptunicoccus; Zhang et al. 2018

Type species
- Neptunicoccus sediminis

Species
- N. sediminis

Genus of bacteria

Neptunicoccus is a Gram-negative and aerobic genus of bacteria from the family of Rhodobacteraceae with one known species (Neptunicoccus sediminis). Neptunicoccus sediminis has been isolated from sediments from the Yellow Sea.
