= Pelagicola =

Scientific classification
- Domain: Bacteria
- Kingdom: Pseudomonadati
- Phylum: Pseudomonadota
- Class: Alphaproteobacteria
- Order: Rhodobacterales
- Family: Rhodobacteraceae
- Genus: Pelagicola; Kim et al. 2008

Type species
- Pelagicola litoralis

Species
- P. litoralis P. litorisediminis

Genus of bacteria

Pelagicola is a genus of bacteria from the family of Rhodobacteraceae.
