= Puniceibacterium antarcticum =

Scientific classification
- Domain: Bacteria
- Kingdom: Pseudomonadati
- Phylum: Pseudomonadota
- Class: Alphaproteobacteria
- Order: Rhodobacterales
- Family: Rhodobacteraceae
- Genus: Puniceibacterium
- Species: P. antarcticum

Binomial name
- Puniceibacterium antarcticum Liu et al. 2014

Type strain
- KACC 16875. CCTCC AB 2013147

Synonyms
- Phaeobacter antarcticus

Species of bacterium

Puniceibacterium antarcticum is a Gram-negative, rod-shaped and aerobic bacterium from the genus of Puniceibacterium which has been isolated from seawater from the Antarctic.
