= Defluviimonas denitrificans =

Scientific classification
- Domain: Bacteria
- Kingdom: Pseudomonadati
- Phylum: Pseudomonadota
- Class: Alphaproteobacteria
- Order: Rhodobacterales
- Family: Rhodobacteraceae
- Genus: Defluviimonas
- Species: D. denitrificans

Binomial name
- Defluviimonas denitrificans Foesel et al. 2013

Type strain
- ATCC BAA-1447, D9-3, DSM 18921

Species of bacterium

Defluviimonas denitrificans is a Gram-negative, chemoheterotrophic and moderately halophilic bacterium from the genus of Defluviimonas which has been isolated from a biofilter of a marine aquaculture system in Rehovot in Israel.
