= Shimia biformata =

Scientific classification
- Domain: Bacteria
- Kingdom: Pseudomonadati
- Phylum: Pseudomonadota
- Class: Alphaproteobacteria
- Order: Rhodobacterales
- Family: Rhodobacteraceae
- Genus: Shimia
- Species: S. biformata

Binomial name
- Shimia biformata Hameed et al. 2013

Type strain
- BCRC 80548, JCM 18818

Species of bacterium

Shimia biformata is a Gram-negative, strictly aerobic, rod-shaped and non-spore-forming bacterium from the genus of Shimia which has been isolated from seawater from Kending County in Taiwan.
