= Celeribacter =

Scientific classification
- Domain: Bacteria
- Kingdom: Pseudomonadati
- Phylum: Pseudomonadota
- Class: Alphaproteobacteria
- Order: Rhodobacterales
- Family: Rhodobacteraceae
- Genus: Celeribacter; Ivanova et al. 2010

Type species
- Celeribacter neptunius

Species
- Celeribacter arenosi (Romanenko et al. 2011) Hördt et al. 2020; C. baekdonensis Lee et al. 2012; C. ethanolicus Jian et al. 2016; C. halophilus (Wang et al. 2012) Lai et al. 2014; C. indicus Lai et al. 2014; C. marinus Baek et al. 2014; C. naphthalenivorans Oh et al. 2015; C. neptunius Ivanova et al. 2010; C. persicus Jami et al. 2016

Synonyms
- Huaishuia Wang et al. 2012; Vadicella Romanenko et al. 2011

Genus of bacteria

Celeribacter is a genus of bacteria from the family Rhodobacteraceae.
