= Thalassococcus =

Scientific classification
- Domain: Bacteria
- Kingdom: Pseudomonadati
- Phylum: Pseudomonadota
- Class: Alphaproteobacteria
- Order: Rhodobacterales
- Family: Rhodobacteraceae
- Genus: Thalassococcus; Lee et al. 2007

Type species
- Thalassococcus halodurans

Species
- T. halodurans T. lentus

Genus of bacteria

Thalassococcus is a genus of bacteria from the family of Rhodobacteraceae.
