= Cognatishimia =

Scientific classification
- Domain: Bacteria
- Kingdom: Pseudomonadati
- Phylum: Pseudomonadota
- Class: Alphaproteobacteria
- Order: Rhodobacterales
- Family: Rhodobacteraceae
- Genus: Cognatishimia; Wirth and Whitman 2018

Type species
- Cognatishimia maritima

Species
- C. maritima

Genus of bacteria

Cognatishimia is a Gram-negative and aerobic genus of bacteria from the family of Rhodobacteraceae with one known species (Cognatishimia maritima). Cognatishimia maritima has been isolated from sea water near Gheje Island in Korea.
