= Paraphaeobacter =

Scientific classification
- Domain: Bacteria
- Kingdom: Pseudomonadati
- Phylum: Pseudomonadota
- Class: Alphaproteobacteria
- Order: Rhodobacterales
- Family: Rhodobacteraceae
- Genus: Paraphaeobacter; Cai et al. 2017

Type species
- Paraphaeobacter pallidus

Species
- P. pallidus

Genus of bacteria

Paraphaeobacter is a Gram-negative and aerobic genus of bacteria from the family of Rhodobacteraceae with one known species (Paraphaeobacter pallidus). Paraphaeobacter pallidus has been isolated from water from the Bohai Sea in China.
