= Halocynthiibacter namhaensis =

Scientific classification
- Domain: Bacteria
- Kingdom: Pseudomonadati
- Phylum: Pseudomonadota
- Class: Alphaproteobacteria
- Order: Rhodobacterales
- Family: Rhodobacteraceae
- Genus: Halocynthiibacter
- Species: H. namhaensis

Binomial name
- Halocynthiibacter namhaensis Kim et al. 2014

Type strain
- KCTC 32362, NBRC 109999, strain RA2-3

Species of bacterium

Halocynthiibacter namhaensis is a Gram-negative, rod-shaped and non-motile bacterium from the genus of Halocynthiibacter which has been isolated from the sea squirt Halocynthia roretzi from the South Sea in Korea.
