= Aliiroseovarius =

Scientific classification
- Domain: Bacteria
- Kingdom: Pseudomonadati
- Phylum: Pseudomonadota
- Class: Alphaproteobacteria
- Order: Rhodobacterales
- Family: Rhodobacteraceae
- Genus: Aliiroseovarius; Park et al. 2015

Type species
- Aliiroseovarius pelagivivens

Species
- A. crassostreae (Boettcher et al. 2005) Park et al. 2015; A. halocynthiae (Kim et al. 2012) Park et al. 2015; A. marinus Wang et al. 2020; A. pelagivivens Park et al. 2015; A. sediminilitoris (Park and Yoon 2013) Park et al. 2015; A. zhejiangensis (Sun et al. 2015) Dobritsa and Samadpour 2016

Synonyms
- Pseudoroseovarius Sun et al. 2015

Genus of bacteria

Aliiroseovarius is a genus of bacteria from the family Rhodobacteraceae.
