= Pseudophaeobacter =

Scientific classification
- Domain: Bacteria
- Kingdom: Pseudomonadati
- Phylum: Pseudomonadota
- Class: Alphaproteobacteria
- Order: Rhodobacterales
- Family: Rhodobacteraceae
- Genus: Pseudophaeobacter; Breider et al. 2014

Species
- Pseudophaeobacter arcticus (Zhang et al. 2008) Breider et al. 2014; Pseudophaeobacter leonis (Gaboyer et al. 2013) Breider et al. 2014

Species of bacterium

Pseudophaeobacter is a genus of bacteria.
