= Tropicimonas arenosa =

Scientific classification
- Domain: Bacteria
- Kingdom: Pseudomonadati
- Phylum: Pseudomonadota
- Class: Alphaproteobacteria
- Order: Rhodobacterales
- Family: Rhodobacteraceae
- Genus: Tropicimonas
- Species: T. arenosa

Binomial name
- Tropicimonas arenosa Oh et al. 2016

Type strain
- KCTC 52178, NBRC 111995

Species of bacterium

Tropicimonas arenosa is a Gram-negative, aerobic, rod-shaped and non-motile bacterium from the genus of Tropicimonas which has been isolated from sand from Jeju Island in Korea.
