= Defluviimonas aquaemixtae =

Scientific classification
- Domain: Bacteria
- Kingdom: Pseudomonadati
- Phylum: Pseudomonadota
- Class: Alphaproteobacteria
- Order: Rhodobacterales
- Family: Rhodobacteraceae
- Genus: Defluviimonas
- Species: D. aquaemixtae

Binomial name
- Defluviimonas aquaemixtae Jung et al. 2014

Type strain
- CECT 8626, KCTC 42108, strain CDM-7

Species of bacterium

Defluviimonas aquaemixtae is a Gram-negative bacterium from the genus of Defluviimonas which has been isolated from Jeju Island in Korea.
