= Tropicimonas =

Scientific classification
- Domain: Bacteria
- Kingdom: Pseudomonadati
- Phylum: Pseudomonadota
- Class: Alphaproteobacteria
- Order: Rhodobacterales
- Family: Rhodobacteraceae
- Genus: Tropicimonas; Harwati et al. 2009

Type species
- Tropicimonas isoalkanivorans

Species
- T. aquimaris T. arenosa T. isoalkanivorans T. sediminicola

Genus of bacteria

Tropicimonas is a genus of bacteria from the family of Rhodobacteraceae.
