= Sedimentitalea todarodis =

Scientific classification
- Domain: Bacteria
- Kingdom: Pseudomonadati
- Phylum: Pseudomonadota
- Class: Alphaproteobacteria
- Order: Rhodobacterales
- Family: Rhodobacteraceae
- Genus: Sedimentitalea
- Species: S. todarodis

Binomial name
- Sedimentitalea todarodis Kim et al. 2016

Type strain
- JCM 31160, KCTC 42412, KHS03

Species of bacterium

Sedimentitalea todarodis is a Gram-negative, rod-shaped, aerobic and motile bacterium from the genus of Sedimentitalea, which has been isolated from the intestinal tract of the squid Todarodes pacificus from the Sea of Japan in Korea.
