= Flavimaricola =

Scientific classification
- Domain: Bacteria
- Kingdom: Pseudomonadati
- Phylum: Pseudomonadota
- Class: Alphaproteobacteria
- Order: Rhodobacterales
- Family: Rhodobacteraceae
- Genus: Flavimaricola; Wirth and Whitman 2018
- Species: F. marinus

Binomial name
- Flavimaricola marinus Wirth and Whitman 2018

Genus of bacteria

Flavimaricola is a genus of bacteria from the family of Rhodobacteraceae with one known species, Flavimaricola marinus.
