= Falsirhodobacter deserti =

Scientific classification
- Domain: Bacteria
- Kingdom: Pseudomonadati
- Phylum: Pseudomonadota
- Class: Alphaproteobacteria
- Order: Rhodobacterales
- Family: Rhodobacteraceae
- Genus: Falsirhodobacter
- Species: F. deserti

Binomial name
- Falsirhodobacter deserti Wang et al. 2015

Type strain
- ACCC 05851, W402, KCTC 32408

Synonyms
- Falsirhodobacter taklimaensis

Species of bacterium

Falsirhodobacter deserti is a Gram-negative, aerobic, halotolerant, heterotrophic and non-motile bacteria bacterium from the genus of Falsirhodobacter which has been isolated from the desert of Xinjiang in China.
