= Limimaricola variabilis =

Scientific classification
- Domain: Bacteria
- Kingdom: Pseudomonadati
- Phylum: Pseudomonadota
- Class: Alphaproteobacteria
- Order: Rhodobacterales
- Family: Rhodobacteraceae
- Genus: Limimaricola
- Species: L. variabilis

Binomial name
- Limimaricola variabilis (Park et al. 2014) Wirth and Whitman 2018

Type strain
- CECT 8572, KCTC 42074, J-MR2-O, J-MR2-Y

Synonyms
- Loktanella variabilis

Species of bacterium

Limimaricola variabilis is a Gram-negative, aerobic and rod-shaped bacterium from the genus of Limimaricola which has been isolated from tidal flat sediments from the South Sea from Korea.
