= Aliishimia =

Scientific classification
- Domain: Bacteria
- Kingdom: Pseudomonadati
- Phylum: Pseudomonadota
- Class: Alphaproteobacteria
- Order: Rhodobacterales
- Family: Rhodobacteraceae
- Genus: Aliishimia; Kim et al. 2019

Type species
- Aliishimia ponticola

Species
- A. ponticola

Genus of bacteria

Aliishimia is a Gram-negative, aerobic and non-motile bacterial genus from the family Rhodobacteraceae with one known species (Aliishimia ponticola). Aliishimia ponticola has been isolated from seawater from Jeju Island.
