= Celeribacter persicus =

Scientific classification
- Domain: Bacteria
- Kingdom: Pseudomonadati
- Phylum: Pseudomonadota
- Class: Alphaproteobacteria
- Order: Rhodobacterales
- Family: Rhodobacteraceae
- Genus: Celeribacter
- Species: C. persicus

Binomial name
- Celeribacter persicus Jami et al. 2016

Type strain
- DSM 100434, MCCC 1A00672, strain SBU1

Species of bacterium

Celeribacter persicus is a Gram-negative and mesophilic bacterium from the genus of Celeribacter which has been isolated from sediments of a mangrove forest from the Nayband Bay from the Iranian Persian Gulf.
