= Shimia sagamensis =

Scientific classification
- Domain: Bacteria
- Kingdom: Pseudomonadati
- Phylum: Pseudomonadota
- Class: Alphaproteobacteria
- Order: Rhodobacterales
- Family: Rhodobacteraceae
- Genus: Shimia
- Species: S. sagamensis

Binomial name
- Shimia sagamensis Nogi et al. 2015

Type strain
- DSM 29734, JCM 30583

Species of bacterium

Shimia sagamensis is a Gram-negative, rod-shaped, non-spore-forming, aerobic and motile bacterium from the genus of Shimia which has been isolated from sediments from the Sagami Bay in Japan.
