= Celeribacter indicus =

Scientific classification
- Domain: Bacteria
- Kingdom: Pseudomonadati
- Phylum: Pseudomonadota
- Class: Alphaproteobacteria
- Order: Rhodobacterales
- Family: Rhodobacteraceae
- Genus: Celeribacter
- Species: C. indicus

Binomial name
- Celeribacter indicus Lai et al. 2014

Type strain
- DSM 27257, LMG 27600, MCCC 1A01112, strain P73

Synonyms
- Celeribacter indica

Species of bacterium

Celeribacter indicus is a bacterium from the genus of Celeribacter which has been isolated from deep sea sediments from the Indian Ocean.Celeribacter indicus can degrade polycyclic aromatic hydrocarbons.
