= Rubricella =

Scientific classification
- Domain: Bacteria
- Kingdom: Pseudomonadati
- Phylum: Pseudomonadota
- Class: Alphaproteobacteria
- Order: Rhodobacterales
- Family: Rhodobacteraceae
- Genus: Rubricella; Yang et al. 2017

Type species
- Rubricella aquisinus

Species
- R. aquisinus

Genus of bacteria

Rubricella is a Gram-negative, aerobic and non-motile genus of bacteria from the family of Rhodobacteraceae with one known species (Rubricella aquisinus). Rubricella aquisinus has been isolated from seawater from the Jiaozhou Bay in China.
