= Seohaeicola nanhaiensis =

Scientific classification
- Domain: Bacteria
- Kingdom: Pseudomonadati
- Phylum: Pseudomonadota
- Class: Alphaproteobacteria
- Order: Rhodobacterales
- Family: Rhodobacteraceae
- Genus: Seohaeicola
- Species: S. nanhaiensis

Binomial name
- Seohaeicola nanhaiensis Xie et al. 2015

Species of bacterium

Seohaeicola nanhaiensis is a Gram-negative, rod-shaped, aerobic and non-motile bacterium from the genus of Seohaeicola which has been isolated from sediments of the South China Sea.
