= Nioella =

Scientific classification
- Domain: Bacteria
- Kingdom: Pseudomonadati
- Phylum: Pseudomonadota
- Class: Alphaproteobacteria
- Order: Rhodobacterales
- Family: Rhodobacteraceae
- Genus: Nioella; Rajasabapathy et al. 2015

Type species
- Nioella nitratireducens

Species
- N. aestuarii N. nitratireducens N. ostreopsis N. sediminis

Genus of bacteria

Nioella is a genus of bacteria in the family of Rhodobacteraceae.
