= Gemmobacter megaterium =

Scientific classification
- Domain: Bacteria
- Kingdom: Pseudomonadati
- Phylum: Pseudomonadota
- Class: Alphaproteobacteria
- Order: Rhodobacterales
- Family: Rhodobacteraceae
- Genus: Gemmobacter
- Species: G. megaterium

Binomial name
- Gemmobacter megaterium Liu et al. 2014

Type strain
- CGMCC 1.11024, CF17, JCM 18498

Species of bacterium

Gemmobacter megaterium is a Gram-negative, aerobic and non-motile bacterium from the genus of Gemmobacter which has been isolated from planktonic seaweed from the Zhoushan sea area in China.
