= Allgaiera =

Scientific classification
- Domain: Bacteria
- Kingdom: Pseudomonadati
- Phylum: Pseudomonadota
- Class: Alphaproteobacteria
- Order: Rhodobacterales
- Family: Rhodobacteraceae
- Genus: Allgaiera; Hördt et al. 2020

Type species
- Allgaiera indica

Species
- Allgaiera indica

Genus of bacteria

Allgaiera is a bacterial genus from the family Rhodobacteraceae with one known species (''Allgaiera indica).
