= Halodurantibacterium =

Scientific classification
- Domain: Bacteria
- Kingdom: Pseudomonadati
- Phylum: Pseudomonadota
- Class: Alphaproteobacteria
- Order: Rhodobacterales
- Family: Rhodobacteraceae
- Genus: Halodurantibacterium; Lv et al. 2015

Type species
- Halodurantibacterium flavum

Species
- H. flavum

Genus of bacteria

Halodurantibacterium is a Gram-negative genus of bacteria from the family of Rhodobacteraceae with one known species (Halodurantibacterium flavum). Halodurantibacterium flavum has been isolated from an oil production mixture from the Daqing Oilfield in China.
