= Seohaeicola =

Scientific classification
- Domain: Bacteria
- Kingdom: Pseudomonadati
- Phylum: Pseudomonadota
- Class: Alphaproteobacteria
- Order: Rhodobacterales
- Family: Rhodobacteraceae
- Genus: Seohaeicola; Yoon et al. 2009

Type species
- Seohaeicola saemankumensis

Species
- S. nanhaiensis S. saemankumensis S. westpacificensis S. zhoushanensis

Genus of bacteria

Seohaeicola is a genus of bacteria from the family of Rhodobacteraceae.
