= Primorskyibacter insulae =

Scientific classification
- Domain: Bacteria
- Kingdom: Pseudomonadati
- Phylum: Pseudomonadota
- Class: Alphaproteobacteria
- Order: Rhodobacterales
- Family: Rhodobacteraceae
- Genus: Primorskyibacter
- Species: P. insulae

Binomial name
- Primorskyibacter insulae Park et al. 2015

Type strain
- CECT 8871, KCTC 42602, strain SSK3-2

Species of bacterium

Primorskyibacter insulae is a gram-negative, aerobic and non-spore-forming bacterium from the genus of Primorskyibacter.
