= Aquimixticola =

Scientific classification
- Domain: Bacteria
- Kingdom: Pseudomonadati
- Phylum: Pseudomonadota
- Class: Alphaproteobacteria
- Order: Rhodobacterales
- Family: Rhodobacteraceae
- Genus: Aquimixticola; Park et al. 2015

Type species
- Aquimixticola soesokkakensis

Species
- A. soesokkakensis

Genus of bacteria

Aquimixticola is a Gram-negative and aerobic genus of bacteria from the family of Rhodobacteraceae with one known species (Aquimixticola soesokkakensis).
