= Litorisediminivivens =

Scientific classification
- Domain: Bacteria
- Kingdom: Pseudomonadati
- Phylum: Pseudomonadota
- Class: Alphaproteobacteria
- Order: Rhodobacterales
- Family: Rhodobacteraceae
- Genus: Litorisediminivivens; Park et al. 2016

Type species
- Litorisediminivivens gilvus

Species
- L. gilvus

Genus of bacteria

Litorisediminivivens is a Gram-negative and aerobic genus of bacteria from the family of Rhodobacteraceae with one known species (Litorisediminivivens gilvus).
