= Actibacterium pelagium =

Scientific classification
- Domain: Bacteria
- Kingdom: Pseudomonadati
- Phylum: Pseudomonadota
- Class: Alphaproteobacteria
- Order: Rhodobacterales
- Family: Rhodobacteraceae
- Genus: Actibacterium
- Species: A. pelagium

Binomial name
- Actibacterium pelagium Guo et al. 2017

Type strain
- CGMCC 1.16012, KCTC 52653, strain JN33

Species of bacterium

Actibacterium pelagium is a Gram-negative, rod-shaped and non-motile bacterium from the genus of Actibacterium which has been isolated from seawater from the Pacific Ocean.
