= Actibacterium =

Scientific classification
- Domain: Bacteria
- Kingdom: Pseudomonadati
- Phylum: Pseudomonadota
- Class: Alphaproteobacteria
- Order: Rhodobacterales
- Family: Rhodobacteraceae
- Genus: Actibacterium; Lucena et al. 2012

Type species
- Actibacterium mucosum Lucena et al. 2012

Species
- A. atlanticum Li et al. 2015; A. lipolyticum (Park et al. 2015) Hördt et al. 2020; A. mucosum Lucena et al. 2012; A. naphthalenivorans (Jeong et al. 2015) Hördt et al. 2020; A. pelagium Guo et al. 2017; A. ureilyticum Lin et al. 2016

Synonyms
- Confluentimicrobium Park et al. 2015

Genus of bacteria

Actibacterium is a bacterial genus from the family Rhodobacteraceae.
