= Arenibacterium halophilum =

Scientific classification
- Domain: Bacteria
- Kingdom: Pseudomonadati
- Phylum: Pseudomonadota
- Class: Alphaproteobacteria
- Order: Rhodobacterales
- Family: Rhodobacteraceae
- Genus: Arenibacterium
- Species: A. halophilum

Binomial name
- Arenibacterium halophilum Baek et al. 2020

Type strain
- CAU 1492

Species of bacterium

Arenibacterium halophilum is a Gram-negative, halotolerant, strictly aerobic, non-spore-forming and motile bacterium from the genus of Arenibacterium.
