= Tritonibacter =

Scientific classification
- Domain: Bacteria
- Kingdom: Pseudomonadati
- Phylum: Pseudomonadota
- Class: Alphaproteobacteria
- Order: Rhodobacterales
- Family: Rhodobacteraceae
- Genus: Tritonibacter; Klotz et al. 2018

Type species
- Tritonibacter horizontis

Species
- T. horizontis

Genus of bacteria

Tritonibacter is a Gram-negative, heterotrophic and aerobic genus of bacteria from the family of Rhodobacteraceae with one known species (Tritonibacter horizontis). Tritonibacter horizontis has been isolated from oil contaminated water from the Deepwater Horizon oil spill in the Gulf of Mexico.
