= Tabrizicola aquatica =

Scientific classification
- Domain: Bacteria
- Kingdom: Pseudomonadati
- Phylum: Pseudomonadota
- Class: Alphaproteobacteria
- Order: Rhodobacterales
- Family: Rhodobacteraceae
- Genus: Tabrizicola
- Species: T. aquatica

Binomial name
- Tabrizicola aquatica Tarhriz et al. 2014

Type strain
- BCCM/LMG 25773, JCM 17277, KCTC 23724, RCRI19

Species of bacterium

Tabrizicola aquatica is a Gram-negative, aerobic, rod-shaped and non-motile bacterium from the genus of Tabrizicola which has been isolated from the Qurugöl Lake near the city Tabriz in Iran.
