= Marivivens =

Scientific classification
- Domain: Bacteria
- Kingdom: Pseudomonadati
- Phylum: Pseudomonadota
- Class: Alphaproteobacteria
- Order: Rhodobacterales
- Family: Rhodobacteraceae
- Genus: Marivivens; Park et al. 2016

Type species
- Marivivens donghaensis

Species
- M. donghaensis M. niveibacter

Genus of bacteria

Marivivens is a genus of bacteria from the family of Rhodobacteraceae.
