= Pseudodonghicola =

Scientific classification
- Domain: Bacteria
- Kingdom: Pseudomonadati
- Phylum: Pseudomonadota
- Class: Alphaproteobacteria
- Order: Rhodobacterales
- Family: Rhodobacteraceae
- Genus: Pseudodonghicola; Hameed et al. 2014

Type species
- Pseudodonghicola xiamenensis

Species
- P. xiamenensis

Genus of bacteria

Pseudodonghicola is a genus of bacteria from the family of Rhodobacteraceae with one known species (Pseudodonghicola xiamenensis). Pseudodonghicola xiamenensis has been isolated from surface seawater from the Taiwan Strait in China.
