= Shimia =

Scientific classification
- Domain: Bacteria
- Kingdom: Pseudomonadati
- Phylum: Pseudomonadota
- Class: Alphaproteobacteria
- Order: Rhodobacterales
- Family: Rhodobacteraceae
- Genus: Shimia; Choi and Cho 2006

Type species
- Shimia marina

Species
- S. abyssi (Nogi et al. 2016) Wirth and Whitman 2018; S. aestuarii (Yi and Chun 2007) Wirth and Whitman 2018; S. aquaeponti (Park et al. 2015) Wirth and Whitman 2018; S. biformata Hameed et al. 2013; S. gijangensis (Kim et al. 2014) Arahal et al. 2019; S. haliotis Hyun et al. 2013; S. isoporae Chen et al. 2011; S. marina Choi and Cho 2006; S. sagamensis Nogi et al. 2015; S. sediminis Zhu et al. 2021; S. thalassica Arahal et al. 2019

Synonyms
- Pseudopelagicola Kim et al. 2014

Genus of bacteria

Shimia is a genus of bacteria from the family Rhodobacteraceae.
