= Tropicimonas sediminicola =

Scientific classification
- Domain: Bacteria
- Kingdom: Pseudomonadati
- Phylum: Pseudomonadota
- Class: Alphaproteobacteria
- Order: Rhodobacterales
- Family: Rhodobacteraceae
- Genus: Tropicimonas
- Species: T. sediminicola

Binomial name
- Tropicimonas sediminicola Harwati et al. 2009

Type strain
- JCM 17731, KACC 15544

Species of bacterium

Tropicimonas sediminicola is a Gram-negative, obligately aerobic, rod-shaped and motile bacterium from the genus of Tropicimonas which has been isolated from marine sediments from an ark clam farm from the coast of Korea.
