= Gemmobacter fontiphilus =

Scientific classification
- Domain: Bacteria
- Kingdom: Pseudomonadati
- Phylum: Pseudomonadota
- Class: Alphaproteobacteria
- Order: Rhodobacterales
- Family: Rhodobacteraceae
- Genus: Gemmobacter
- Species: G. fontiphilus

Binomial name
- Gemmobacter fontiphilus Chen et al. 2013

Type strain
- BCRC 80082, JS43, LMG 25376

Species of bacterium

Gemmobacter fontiphilus is a Gram-negative, rod-shaped, non-spore-forming, facultatively anaerobic and non-motile bacterium from the genus of Gemmobacter which has been isolated from a freshwater spring from Taiwan.
