= Nioella nitratireducens =

Scientific classification
- Domain: Bacteria
- Kingdom: Pseudomonadati
- Phylum: Pseudomonadota
- Class: Alphaproteobacteria
- Order: Rhodobacterales
- Family: Rhodobacteraceae
- Genus: Nioella
- Species: N. nitratireducens

Binomial name
- Nioella nitratireducens Rajasabapathy et al. 2015

Type strain
- KCTC 32417, NCIM 5499, strain SSW136

Species of bacterium

Nioella nitratireducens is a Gram-negative, non-spore-forming, rod-shaped and aerobic bacterium in the genus Nioella which has been isolated from seawater from Espalamaca, Azores.
