= Oceaniglobus =

Scientific classification
- Domain: Bacteria
- Kingdom: Pseudomonadati
- Phylum: Pseudomonadota
- Class: Alphaproteobacteria
- Order: Rhodobacterales
- Family: Rhodobacteraceae
- Genus: Oceaniglobus; Li et al. 2017

Type species
- Oceaniglobus indicus

Species
- O. indicus

Genus of bacteria

Oceaniglobus is a Gram-negative and aerobic genus of bacteria from the family of Rhodobacteraceae with one known species (Oceaniglobus indicus). Oceaniglobus indicus has been isolated from seawater from the Indian Ocean.
