= Defluviimonas nitratireducens =

Scientific classification
- Domain: Bacteria
- Kingdom: Pseudomonadati
- Phylum: Pseudomonadota
- Class: Alphaproteobacteria
- Order: Rhodobacterales
- Family: Rhodobacteraceae
- Genus: Defluviimonas
- Species: D. nitratireducens

Binomial name
- Defluviimonas nitratireducens Liu et al. 2017

Type strain
- DL5-4, LMG 29616, MCCC 1A06955

Synonyms
- Defluviimonas dalianensis

Species of bacterium

Defluviimonas nitratireducens is a Gram-negative, short-rod-shaped and non-motile bacterium from the genus of Defluviimonas which has been isolated from seawater from the Dalian Bay.
