= Lutimaribacter saemankumensis =

Scientific classification
- Domain: Bacteria
- Kingdom: Pseudomonadati
- Phylum: Pseudomonadota
- Class: Alphaproteobacteria
- Order: Rhodobacterales
- Family: Rhodobacteraceae
- Genus: Lutimaribacter
- Species: L. saemankumensis

Binomial name
- Lutimaribacter saemankumensis Yoon et al. 2009

Type strain
- CCUG 55760, DSM 28010, KCTC 22244

Synonyms
- Saemankumia lutimaris

Species of bacterium

Lutimaribacter saemankumensis is a Gram-negative, rod-shaped and non-motile bacterium from the genus of Lutimaribacter which has been isolated from tidal flat sediments from the Yellow Sea from Korea.
