= Celeribacter marinus =

Scientific classification
- Domain: Bacteria
- Kingdom: Pseudomonadati
- Phylum: Pseudomonadota
- Class: Alphaproteobacteria
- Order: Rhodobacterales
- Family: Rhodobacteraceae
- Genus: Celeribacter
- Species: C. marinus

Binomial name
- Celeribacter marinus Baek et al. 2014

Type strain
- IMCC12053, KACC 17482, NBRC 109702

Species of bacterium

Celeribacter marinus is a gram-negative, rod-shaped and non-motile bacterium from the genus of Celeribacter which has been isolated from seawater from the Yellow Sea in Korea.
