= Paenirhodobacter =

Scientific classification
- Domain: Bacteria
- Kingdom: Pseudomonadati
- Phylum: Pseudomonadota
- Class: Alphaproteobacteria
- Order: Rhodobacterales
- Family: Rhodobacteraceae
- Genus: Paenirhodobacter; Wang et al. 2014

Type species
- Paenirhodobacter enshiensis

Species
- P. enshiensis

Genus of bacteria

Paenirhodobacter is a genus of bacteria from the family of Rhodobacteraceae with one known species (Paenirhodobacter enshiensis). Paenirhodobacter enshiensis has been isolated from soil.
