= Acidimangrovimonas pyrenivorans =

Scientific classification
- Domain: Bacteria
- Kingdom: Pseudomonadati
- Phylum: Pseudomonadota
- Class: Alphaproteobacteria
- Order: Rhodobacterales
- Family: Paracoccaceae
- Genus: Acidimangrovimonas
- Species: A. pyrenivoranss

Binomial name
- Acidimangrovimonas pyrenivoranss (Zhang et al. 2018) Ren et al. 2019

Type strain
- CICC 24263, KCTC 62192, strain PrR001

Synonyms
- Defluviimonas pyrenivorans

Species of bacterium

Acidimangrovimonas pyrenivorans is a gram-negative, aerobic, rod-shaped and non-motile species of bacteria from the genus of Acidimangrovimonas that was first isolated and described in 2018 from sediments drawn from the Pearl River.
