= Planktotalea arctica =

Scientific classification
- Domain: Bacteria
- Kingdom: Pseudomonadati
- Phylum: Pseudomonadota
- Class: Alphaproteobacteria
- Order: Rhodobacterales
- Family: Rhodobacteraceae
- Genus: Planktotalea
- Species: P. arctica

Binomial name
- Planktotalea arctica Baek et al. 2017

Type strain
- KACC 18009, NBRC 110393, strain IMCC9565

Species of bacterium

Planktotalea arctica is a Gram-negative, rod-shaped and non-motile bacterium from the genus of Planktotalea which has been isolated from coastal seawater from the Arctic.
