= Celeribacter ethanolicus =

Scientific classification
- Domain: Bacteria
- Kingdom: Pseudomonadati
- Phylum: Pseudomonadota
- Class: Alphaproteobacteria
- Order: Rhodobacterales
- Family: Rhodobacteraceae
- Genus: Celeribacter
- Species: C. ethanolicus

Binomial name
- Celeribacter ethanolicus Jian et al. 2016

Type strain
- CGMCC 1.15406, JCM 31095, strain NH195

Species of bacterium

Celeribacter ethanolicus is a bacterium from the genus of Celeribacter which has been isolated from seawater from the South China Sea.
