= Acidimangrovimonas sediminis =

Scientific classification
- Domain: Bacteria
- Kingdom: Pseudomonadati
- Phylum: Pseudomonadota
- Class: Alphaproteobacteria
- Order: Rhodobacterales
- Family: Paracoccaceae
- Genus: Acidimangrovimonas
- Species: A. sediminis

Binomial name
- Acidimangrovimonas sediminis Ren et al. 2019

Type strain
- MS2-2

Species of bacterium

Acidimangrovimonas sediminis is a Gram-negative, aerobic, rod-shaped and non-motile bacterium from the genus of Acidimangrovimonas which has been isolated from mangrove sediments from the Jiulong River in China.
