= Shimia aquaeponti =

Scientific classification
- Domain: Bacteria
- Kingdom: Pseudomonadati
- Phylum: Pseudomonadota
- Class: Alphaproteobacteria
- Order: Rhodobacterales
- Family: Rhodobacteraceae
- Genus: Shimia
- Species: S. aquaeponti

Binomial name
- Shimia aquaeponti (Park et al. 2015) Wirth and Whitman 2018

Type strain
- KCTC 42115, NBRC 110378

Synonyms
- Thalassobius aquaeponti

Species of bacterium

Shimia aquaeponti is a Gram-negative, aerobic, rod-shaped and non-motile bacterium from the genus of Shimia which has been isolated from seawater from the Geoje island in Korea.
