= Pacificibacter marinus =

Scientific classification
- Domain: Bacteria
- Kingdom: Pseudomonadati
- Phylum: Pseudomonadota
- Class: Alphaproteobacteria
- Order: Rhodobacterales
- Family: Rhodobacteraceae
- Genus: Pacificibacter
- Species: P. marinus

Binomial name
- Pacificibacter marinus (Jung et al. 2011) Park et al. 2015

Synonyms
- Roseovarius marinus

Species of bacterium

Pacificibacter marinus is a Gram-negative and non-motile bacterium from the genus of Pacificibacter has been isolated from seawater from the Yellow Sea at Hwang-do in Korea.
