= Actibacterium lipolyticum =

Scientific classification
- Domain: Bacteria
- Kingdom: Pseudomonadati
- Phylum: Pseudomonadota
- Class: Alphaproteobacteria
- Order: Rhodobacterales
- Family: Rhodobacteraceae
- Genus: Actibacterium
- Species: A. lipolyticum

Binomial name
- Actibacterium lipolyticum (Park et al. 2015) Hördt et al. 2020

Type strain
- CECT 8621, KCTC 42136, strain SSK1-4

Synonyms
- Aquimexus lipolyticus; Confluentimicrobium lipolyticum Park et al. 2015

Species of bacterium

Actibacterium lipolyticum is a Gram-negative and aerobic bacterium from the genus Actibacterium which has been isolated from Jeju Island in Korea.
