= Carideicomes =

Scientific classification
- Domain: Bacteria
- Kingdom: Pseudomonadati
- Phylum: Pseudomonadota
- Class: Alphaproteobacteria
- Order: Rhodobacterales
- Family: Rhodobacteraceae
- Genus: Carideicomes; Wang et al. 2020

Type species
- Carideicomes alvinocaridis

Species
- C. alvinocaridis

Genus of bacteria

Carideicomes is a Gram-negative, strictly aerobic, oval-shaped and non-motile bacterial genus from the family Rhodobacteraceae with one known species (''Carideicomes alvinocaridis).
