= Kopriimonas =

Scientific classification (Candidatus)
- Domain: Bacteria
- Kingdom: Pseudomonadati
- Phylum: Pseudomonadota
- Class: Alphaproteobacteria
- Order: Rhodobacterales
- Family: Rhodobacteraceae
- Genus: Kopriimonas; Quinn et al. 2012

Species
- "Candidatus Kopriimonas aquariorum" corrig. Quinn et al. 2012; "Candidatus Kopriimonas byunsanensis" Quinn et al. 2012; "Candidatus Kopriimonas piscilacus" corrig. Quinn et al. 2012

Genus of bacteria

"Candidatus Kopriimonas" is a genus of bacteria from the family of Rhodobacteraceae. Kopriimonas byunsanensis has been isolated from a marine biofilm.
