= Paradonghicola =

Scientific classification
- Domain: Bacteria
- Kingdom: Pseudomonadati
- Phylum: Pseudomonadota
- Class: Alphaproteobacteria
- Order: Rhodobacterales
- Family: Rhodobacteraceae
- Genus: Paradonghicola; Lee et al. 2018

Species
- P. geojensis

Genus of bacteria

Paradonghicola is a Gram-negative and aerobic genus of bacteria from the family of Rhodobacteraceae with one known species (Paradonghicola geojensis). Paradonghicola geojensis has been isolated from seawater from Geoje-si in Korea.
