= Pseudoruegeria sabulilitoris =

Scientific classification
- Domain: Bacteria
- Kingdom: Pseudomonadati
- Phylum: Pseudomonadota
- Class: Alphaproteobacteria
- Order: Rhodobacterales
- Family: Rhodobacteraceae
- Genus: Pseudoruegeria
- Species: P. sabulilitoris

Binomial name
- Pseudoruegeria sabulilitoris Park et al. 2014

Type strain
- KCTC 42111, NBRC 110380, strain GJMS-35

Species of bacterium

Pseudoruegeria sabulilitoris is a Gram-negative, non-spore-forming, aerobic and non-motile bacterium from the genus of Pseudoruegeria which has been isolated from seashore sand from the Geoje Island in Korea.
