= Aliiroseovarius crassostreae =

Scientific classification
- Domain: Bacteria
- Kingdom: Pseudomonadati
- Phylum: Pseudomonadota
- Class: Alphaproteobacteria
- Order: Rhodobacterales
- Family: Rhodobacteraceae
- Genus: Aliiroseovarius
- Species: A. crassostreae

Binomial name
- Aliiroseovarius crassostreae (Boettcher et al. 2005) Park et al. 2015

Type strain
- ATCC BAA-1102, CV919-312

Synonyms
- Crassostrea virginica, Pseudoroseovarius crassostreae, Roseovarius crassostreae

Species of bacterium

Aliiroseovarius crassostreae is a Gram-negative and aerobic bacterium from the genus of Aliiroseovarius. Aliiroseovarius crassostreae can cause the juvenile oyster disease in oysters.
