= Pelagicola litoralis =

Scientific classification
- Domain: Bacteria
- Kingdom: Pseudomonadati
- Phylum: Pseudomonadota
- Class: Alphaproteobacteria
- Order: Rhodobacterales
- Family: Rhodobacteraceae
- Genus: Pelagicola
- Species: P. litoralis

Binomial name
- Pelagicola litoralis Kim et al. 2008

Type strain
- CL-ES2, DSM 18290, KCCM 42274

Species of bacterium

Pelagicola litoralis is a Gram-negative, strictly aerobic and non-motile bacterium from the genus of Pelagicola which has been isolated from coastal water from the Sea of Japan (East Sea) from Korea.
