= Puniceibacterium =

Scientific classification
- Domain: Bacteria
- Kingdom: Pseudomonadati
- Phylum: Pseudomonadota
- Class: Alphaproteobacteria
- Order: Rhodobacterales
- Family: Rhodobacteraceae
- Genus: Puniceibacterium; Liu et al. 2014

Type species
- Puniceibacterium antarcticum

Species
- Puniceibacterium antarcticum Puniceibacterium confluentis Puniceibacterium sediminis

Genus of bacteria

Puniceibacterium is a genus of bacteria from the family Rhodobacteraceae.
