= Seohaeicola saemankumensis =

Scientific classification
- Domain: Bacteria
- Kingdom: Pseudomonadati
- Phylum: Pseudomonadota
- Class: Alphaproteobacteria
- Order: Rhodobacterales
- Family: Rhodobacteraceae
- Genus: Seohaeicola
- Species: S. nanhaiensis

Binomial name
- Seohaeicola nanhaiensis Yoon et al. 2009

Type strain
- CCUG 55328, KCTC 22175

Species of bacterium

Seohaeicola saemankumensis is a Gram-negative and non-motile bacterium from the genus of Seohaeicola which has been isolated from tidal flat sediments from the Yellow Sea from Korea.
