= Limimaricola soesokkakensis =

Scientific classification
- Domain: Bacteria
- Kingdom: Pseudomonadati
- Phylum: Pseudomonadota
- Class: Alphaproteobacteria
- Order: Rhodobacterales
- Family: Rhodobacteraceae
- Genus: Limimaricola
- Species: L. soesokkakensis

Binomial name
- Limimaricola soesokkakensis ( Park et al. 2014) Wirth and Whitman 2018

Type strain
- CECT 8367, KCTC 32425, DSSK1-5

Synonyms
- Loktanella soesokkakensis

Species of bacterium

Limimaricola soesokkakensis is a Gram-negative, aerobic and rod-shaped bacterium from the genus of Limimaricola.
