= Arenibacterium arenosum =

Scientific classification
- Domain: Bacteria
- Kingdom: Pseudomonadati
- Phylum: Pseudomonadota
- Class: Alphaproteobacteria
- Order: Rhodobacterales
- Family: Rhodobacteraceae
- Genus: Arenibacterium
- Species: A. arenosum

Binomial name
- Arenibacterium arenosum Jeong et al. 2022

Type strain
- CAU 1593T

Species of bacterium

Arenibacterium arenosum is a Gram-negative, aerobic, rod-shaped and non-motile bacterium from the genus of Arenibacterium which has been isolated from sand from the coast of Korea.
