= Celeribacter halophilus =

Scientific classification
- Domain: Bacteria
- Kingdom: Pseudomonadati
- Phylum: Pseudomonadota
- Class: Alphaproteobacteria
- Order: Rhodobacterales
- Family: Rhodobacteraceae
- Genus: Celeribacter
- Species: C. halophilus

Binomial name
- Celeribacter halophilus (Wang et al. 2012)Lai et al. 2014

Type strain
- CGMCC 1.8891, LMG 24854, strain ZXM137

Synonyms
- Huaishuia halophila

Species of bacterium

Celeribacter halophilus is a Gram-negative and non-motile bacterium from the genus of Celeribacter which has been isolated from seawater from the coastal region of Qingdao in China.
