= Roseisalinus =

Scientific classification
- Domain: Bacteria
- Kingdom: Pseudomonadati
- Phylum: Pseudomonadota
- Class: Alphaproteobacteria
- Order: Rhodobacterales
- Family: Rhodobacteraceae
- Genus: Roseisalinus; Labrenz et al. 2005

Species
- Roseisalinus antarcticus

Genus of bacteria

Roseisalinus is a genus of bacteria in the family Rhodobacteraceae.
