= Pontibaca =

Scientific classification
- Domain: Bacteria
- Kingdom: Pseudomonadati
- Phylum: Pseudomonadota
- Class: Alphaproteobacteria
- Order: Rhodobacterales
- Family: Rhodobacteraceae
- Genus: Pontibaca; Kim et al. 2010

Type species
- Pontibaca methylaminivorans

Species
- P. methylaminivorans

Genus of bacteria

Pontibaca is a Gram-negative genus of bacteria from the family of Rhodobacteraceae with one known species (Pontibaca methylaminivorans). Pontibaca methylaminivorans has been isolated from coastal sediments from the Sea of Japan.
