= Thalassobius =

Scientific classification
- Domain: Bacteria
- Kingdom: Pseudomonadati
- Phylum: Pseudomonadota
- Class: Alphaproteobacteria
- Order: Rhodobacterales
- Family: Rhodobacteraceae
- Genus: Thalassobius; Arahal et al. 2005

Species
- Thalassobius autumnalis Pujalte et al. 2018; Thalassobius gelatinovorus (Rüger and Höfle 1992) Arahal et al. 2006; Thalassobius litoralis (Iwaki et al. 2013) Hördt et al. 2020; Thalassobius litorarius Park et al. 2016; Thalassobius mediterraneus Arahal et al. 2005; Thalassobius taeanensis (Jin et al. 2011) Hördt et al. 2020

Synonyms
- Litorimicrobium Jin et al. 2011

Genus of bacteria

Thalassobius is a genus of bacteria in the family Rhodobacteraceae.
