= Primorskyibacter sedentarius =

Scientific classification
- Domain: Bacteria
- Kingdom: Pseudomonadati
- Phylum: Pseudomonadota
- Class: Alphaproteobacteria
- Order: Rhodobacterales
- Family: Rhodobacteraceae
- Genus: Primorskyibacter
- Species: P. sedentarius

Binomial name
- Primorskyibacter sedentarius Romanenko et al. 2011

Type strain
- JCM 16874, KMM 9018, NRIC 0784

Synonyms
- Primoryibacter sedentarius

Species of bacterium

Primorskyibacter sedentarius is a Gram-negative, aerobic, rod-shaped and non-motile bacterium from the genus of Primorskyibacter which has been isolated from shallow sediments from the Sea of Japan.
