= Pseudophaeobacter leonis =

Scientific classification
- Domain: Bacteria
- Kingdom: Pseudomonadati
- Phylum: Pseudomonadota
- Class: Alphaproteobacteria
- Order: Rhodobacterales
- Family: Rhodobacteraceae
- Genus: Pseudophaeobacter
- Species: P. leonis

Binomial name
- Pseudophaeobacter leonis (Gaboyer et al. 2013) Breider et al. 2014

Type strain
- 306, 306CIP 110369, CIP 110369, DSM 25627, UBOCC 3187

Synonyms
- Phaeobacter leonis Gaboyer et al. 2013

Species of bacterium

Pseudophaeobacter leonis is a Gram-negative, strictly aerobic and heterotrophic bacteria from the genus Pseudophaeobacter which has been isolated from anoxic marine sediments from the Gulf of Lions.
