= Pseudoruegeria limi =

Scientific classification
- Domain: Bacteria
- Kingdom: Pseudomonadati
- Phylum: Pseudomonadota
- Class: Alphaproteobacteria
- Order: Rhodobacterales
- Family: Rhodobacteraceae
- Genus: Pseudoruegeria
- Species: P. limi

Binomial name
- Pseudoruegeria limi Lee et al. 2014

Type strain
- JCM 19487, JCM 19487, KCTC 32460, strain D-17

Species of bacterium

Pseudoruegeria limi is a Gram-negative, aerobic, rod-shaped and non-motil bacterium from the genus of Pseudoruegeria which has been isolated from the Yellow Sea in Korea.
