= Planktomarina =

Scientific classification
- Domain: Bacteria
- Kingdom: Pseudomonadati
- Phylum: Pseudomonadota
- Class: Alphaproteobacteria
- Order: Rhodobacterales
- Family: Rhodobacteraceae
- Genus: Planktomarina; Giebel et al. 2013

Type species
- Planktomarina temperata

Species
- P. temperata

Genus of bacteria

Planktomarina is a heterotrophic genus of bacteria from the family of Rhodobacteraceae with one known species (Planktomarina temperata). Planktomarina temperata has been isolated from seawater from the Wadden Sea in Germany.
