= Pacificibacter maritimus =

Scientific classification
- Domain: Bacteria
- Kingdom: Pseudomonadati
- Phylum: Pseudomonadota
- Class: Alphaproteobacteria
- Order: Rhodobacterales
- Family: Rhodobacteraceae
- Genus: Pacificibacter
- Species: P. maritimus

Binomial name
- Pacificibacter maritimus Romanenko et al. 2011

Type strain
- JCM 17096, KMM 9031, NRIC 0785

Synonyms
- Pacifibacter maritimus

Species of bacterium

Pacificibacter maritimus is a Gram-negative, non-pigmented, aerobic and non-motile bacterium from the genus of Pacificibacter which has been isolated from sandy sediments from the Sea of Japan.
