= Pelagicola litorisediminis =

Scientific classification
- Domain: Bacteria
- Kingdom: Pseudomonadati
- Phylum: Pseudomonadota
- Class: Alphaproteobacteria
- Order: Rhodobacterales
- Family: Rhodobacteraceae
- Genus: Pelagicola
- Species: P. litorisediminis

Binomial name
- Pelagicola litorisediminis Park et al. 2013

Type strain
- CECT 8287, D1-W8, KCTC 32327

Species of bacterium

Pelagicola litorisediminis is a Gram-negative, aerobic and non-motile bacterium from the genus of Pelagicola which has been isolated from tidal flat sediments from the South Sea in Korea.
