= Jhaorihella =

Scientific classification
- Domain: Bacteria
- Kingdom: Pseudomonadati
- Phylum: Pseudomonadota
- Class: Alphaproteobacteria
- Order: Rhodobacterales
- Family: Rhodobacteraceae
- Genus: Jhaorihella; Rekha et al. 2011

Type species
- Jhaorihella thermophila

Species
- J. thermophila

Genus of bacteria

Jhaorihella is a Gram-negative and aerobic genus of bacteria from the family of Rhodobacteraceae with one known species (Jhaorihella thermophila).Jhaorihella thermophila has been isolated from a hot spring from the coast of the Green Island in Taiwan.
