= Defluviimonas aestuarii =

Scientific classification
- Domain: Bacteria
- Kingdom: Pseudomonadati
- Phylum: Pseudomonadota
- Class: Alphaproteobacteria
- Order: Rhodobacterales
- Family: Rhodobacteraceae
- Genus: Defluviimonas
- Species: D. aestuarii

Binomial name
- Defluviimonas aestuarii Math et al. 2013

Type strain
- JCM 18630, KACC 16442, BS14

Species of bacterium

Defluviimonas aestuarii is a Gram-negative and strictly aerobic, moderately halophilic and non-motile bacterium from the genus of Defluviimonas which has been isolated from marine tidal flat sediments from the South Sea in Korea.
