= Lacimonas =

Scientific classification
- Domain: Bacteria
- Kingdom: Pseudomonadati
- Phylum: Pseudomonadota
- Class: Alphaproteobacteria
- Order: Rhodobacterales
- Family: Rhodobacteraceae
- Genus: Lacimonas; Zhong et al. 2015

Type species
- Lacimonas salitolerans

Species
- L. salitolerans

Genus of bacteria

Lacimonas is a Gram-negative genus of bacteria from the family of Rhodobacteraceae with one known species (Lacimonas salitolerans). Lacimonas salitolerans has been isolated from the Lake Tuosu from Qinghai in China.
