= Aliiroseovarius zhejiangensis =

Scientific classification
- Domain: Bacteria
- Kingdom: Pseudomonadati
- Phylum: Pseudomonadota
- Class: Alphaproteobacteria
- Order: Rhodobacterales
- Family: Rhodobacteraceae
- Genus: Aliiroseovarius
- Species: A. zhejiangensis

Binomial name
- Aliiroseovarius zhejiangensis (Sun et al. 2015) Dobritsa and Samadpour 2016

Type strain
- KCTC 42443, MCCC 1K00457, strain JB3

Synonyms
- Pseudoroseovarius zhejiangensis

Species of bacterium

Aliiroseovarius zhejiangensis is a Gram-negative, aerobic, rod-shaped and non-motile bacterium from the genus of Aliiroseovarius which has been isolated from wastewater from a Haiyan fine chemical factory from Zhejiang in China.
