= Limimaricola =

Scientific classification
- Domain: Bacteria
- Kingdom: Pseudomonadati
- Phylum: Pseudomonadota
- Class: Alphaproteobacteria
- Order: Rhodobacterales
- Family: Rhodobacteraceae
- Genus: Limimaricola; Wirth and Whitman 2018

Type species
- Limimaricola hongkongensis

Species
- L. aestuariicola L. cinnabarinus L. hongkongensis L. pyoseonensis L. soesokkakensis L. variabilis

Genus of bacteria

"Limimaricola" is a genus of bacteria from the family of Rhodobacteraceae.
