= Pseudoruegeria marinistellae =

Scientific classification
- Domain: Bacteria
- Kingdom: Pseudomonadati
- Phylum: Pseudomonadota
- Class: Alphaproteobacteria
- Order: Rhodobacterales
- Family: Rhodobacteraceae
- Genus: Pseudoruegeria
- Species: P. marinistellae

Binomial name
- Pseudoruegeria marinistellae Zhang et al. 2017

Type strain
- KCTC 42910, MCCC 1K01155, strain SF-16

Species of bacterium

Pseudoruegeria marinistellae is a Gram-negative, rod-shaped, facultatively anaerobic and non-motile bacterium from the genus of Pseudoruegeria which has been isolated from a starfish from Sanya in China.
