= Pacificibacter aestuarii =

Scientific classification
- Domain: Bacteria
- Kingdom: Pseudomonadati
- Phylum: Pseudomonadota
- Class: Alphaproteobacteria
- Order: Rhodobacterales
- Family: Rhodobacteraceae
- Genus: Pacificibacter
- Species: P. aestuarii

Binomial name
- Pacificibacter aestuarii Hyeon et al. 2017

Type strain
- JCM 31805, KACC 19098, strain KJ21

Species of bacterium

Pacificibacter aestuarii is a Gram-negative, strictly aerobic and non-motile bacterium from the genus of Pacificibacter which has been isolated from tidal flat sediments from Korea.
