= Planktotalea frisia =

Scientific classification
- Domain: Bacteria
- Kingdom: Pseudomonadati
- Phylum: Pseudomonadota
- Class: Alphaproteobacteria
- Order: Rhodobacterales
- Family: Rhodobacteraceae
- Genus: Planktotalea
- Species: P. frisia

Binomial name
- Planktotalea frisia Hahnke et al. 2012

Type strain
- DSM 23709, LMG 25294, SH6-1

Species of bacterium

Planktotalea frisia is a heterotrophic and aerobic bacterium from the genus of Planktotalea which has been isolated from seawater from the North Sea in Germany.
