= Roseibaca ekhonensis =

Scientific classification
- Domain: Bacteria
- Kingdom: Pseudomonadati
- Phylum: Pseudomonadota
- Class: Alphaproteobacteria
- Order: Rhodobacterales
- Family: Rhodobacteraceae
- Genus: Roseibaca
- Species: R. ekhonensis

Binomial name
- Roseibaca ekhonensis Labrenz et al. 2009

Type strain
- CECT 7235, DSM 11469, EL-50

Species of bacterium

Roseibaca ekhonensis is a Gram-negative, aerobic and alkalitolerant bacterium from the genus of Roseibaca which has been isolated from water from the Ekho Lake in the Antarctica.
