= Silicimonas =

Scientific classification
- Domain: Bacteria
- Kingdom: Pseudomonadati
- Phylum: Pseudomonadota
- Class: Alphaproteobacteria
- Order: Rhodobacterales
- Family: Rhodobacteraceae
- Genus: Silicimonas; Crenn et al. 2016

Type species
- Silicimonas algicola

Species
- S. algicola

Genus of bacteria

Silicimonas is a Gram-negative, aerobic and non-motile genus of bacteria from the family of Rhodobacteraceae with one known species, Silicimonas algicola. Silicimonas algicola has been isolated from the diatom Thalassiosira delicatula from France.
