= Albirhodobacter marinus =

Scientific classification
- Domain: Bacteria
- Kingdom: Pseudomonadati
- Phylum: Pseudomonadota
- Class: Alphaproteobacteria
- Order: Rhodobacterales
- Family: Rhodobacteraceae
- Genus: Albirhodobacter
- Species: A. marinus

Binomial name
- Albirhodobacter marinus Nupur et al. 2015

Type strain
- JCM 17680, MTCC 11277, N9

Species of bacterium

Albirhodobacter marinus is a Gram-negative and rod-shaped bacterium from the genus of Albirhodobacter which has been isolated from water from the sea shore in Visakhapatnam in India.
