= Litorisediminicola =

Scientific classification
- Domain: Bacteria
- Kingdom: Pseudomonadati
- Phylum: Pseudomonadota
- Class: Alphaproteobacteria
- Order: Rhodobacterales
- Family: Rhodobacteraceae
- Genus: Litorisediminicola; Yoon et al. 2013

Type species
- Litorisediminicola beolgyonensis

Species
- L. beolgyonensis

Genus of bacteria

Litorisediminicola is a Gram-negative, aerobic and non-spore-forming genus of bacteria from the family of Rhodobacteraceae with one known species (Litorisediminicola beolgyonensis). Litorisediminicola beolgyonensis has been isolated from coastal sediments from Korea.
