= Plastorhodobacter =

Scientific classification
- Domain: Bacteria
- Kingdom: Pseudomonadati
- Phylum: Pseudomonadota
- Class: Alphaproteobacteria
- Order: Rhodobacterales
- Family: Rhodobacteraceae
- Genus: Plastorhodobacter; Xie et al. 2015

Species
- "P. daqingensis"

Genus of bacteria

"Plastorhodobacter" is a Gram-negative and aerobic genus of bacteria from the family of Rhodobacteraceae with one known species ("Plastorhodobacter daqingensis"). "Plastorhodobacter daqingensis" has been isolated from the Daqing Oilfield in China.
