= Marivivens niveibacter =

Scientific classification
- Domain: Bacteria
- Kingdom: Pseudomonadati
- Phylum: Pseudomonadota
- Class: Alphaproteobacteria
- Order: Rhodobacterales
- Family: Rhodobacteraceae
- Genus: Marivivens
- Species: M. niveibacter

Binomial name
- Marivivens niveibacter Hu et al. 2018

Type strain
- KCTC 52588, MCCC 1A06712, strain HSLHS2

Species of bacterium

Marivivens niveibacter is a Gram-negative, aerobic and non-motile bacterium from the genus of Marivivens which has been isolated from seawater from a tropical mangrove forest.
