= Pontivivens =

Scientific classification
- Domain: Bacteria
- Kingdom: Pseudomonadati
- Phylum: Pseudomonadota
- Class: Alphaproteobacteria
- Order: Rhodobacterales
- Family: Rhodobacteraceae
- Genus: Pontivivens; Park et al. 2015

Type species
- Pontivivens insulae

Species
- P. insulae

Genus of bacteria

Pontivivens is a Gram-negative and aerobic genus of bacteria from the family of Rhodobacteraceae with one known species (Pontivivens insulae). Pontivivens insulae has been isolated from seawater from the Geoje Island in Korea.
