= Albidovulum =

Scientific classification
- Domain: Bacteria
- Kingdom: Pseudomonadati
- Phylum: Pseudomonadota
- Class: Alphaproteobacteria
- Order: Rhodobacterales
- Family: Rhodobacteraceae
- Genus: Albidovulum; Albuquerque et al. 2003

Species
- A. inexpectatum; A. xiamenense

Genus of bacteria

Albidovulum is a genus of bacteria in the family Rhodobacteraceae.
