= Lutimaribacter marinistellae =

Scientific classification
- Domain: Bacteria
- Kingdom: Pseudomonadati
- Phylum: Pseudomonadota
- Class: Alphaproteobacteria
- Order: Rhodobacterales
- Family: Rhodobacteraceae
- Genus: Lutimaribacter
- Species: L. marinistellae

Binomial name
- Lutimaribacter marinistellae Zhang et al. 2016

Type strain
- JCM 17792, KCTC 23660, strain KU5D5

Species of bacterium

Lutimaribacter marinistellae is a Gram-negative, non-spore-forming and motile bacterium from the genus of Lutimaribacter which has been isolated from a starfish from Sanya in China.
