= Sedimentitalea =

Scientific classification
- Domain: Bacteria
- Kingdom: Pseudomonadati
- Phylum: Pseudomonadota
- Class: Alphaproteobacteria
- Order: Rhodobacterales
- Family: Rhodobacteraceae
- Genus: Sedimentitalea reider et al. 2014

Type species
- Sedimentitalea nanhaiensis

Species
- S. nanhaiensis S. todarodis

Genus of bacteria

Sedimentitalea is a genus of bacteria from the family of Rhodobacteraceae.
