= Allosediminivita =

Scientific classification
- Domain: Bacteria
- Kingdom: Pseudomonadati
- Phylum: Pseudomonadota
- Class: Alphaproteobacteria
- Order: Rhodobacterales
- Family: Rhodobacteraceae
- Genus: Allosediminivita; Hördt et al. 2020

Type species
- Allosediminivita pacifica

Species
- A. pacifica

Genus of bacteria

Allosediminivita is a Gram-negative and short-rod-shaped bacterial genus from the family Rhodobacteraceae. Roseivivax pacificus has been reclassified to Allosediminivita pacifica.
