= Halocynthiibacter arcticus =

Scientific classification
- Domain: Bacteria
- Kingdom: Pseudomonadati
- Phylum: Pseudomonadota
- Class: Alphaproteobacteria
- Order: Rhodobacterales
- Family: Rhodobacteraceae
- Genus: Halocynthiibacter
- Species: H. arcticus

Binomial name
- Halocynthiibacter arcticus Baek et al. 2015

Type strain
- JCM 30530, KCTC 42129, strain PAMC 20958

Species of bacterium

Halocynthiibacter arcticus is a Gram-negative, rod-shaped, aerobic and non-motile bacterium from the genus of Halocynthiibacter which has been isolated from marine sediments from the Arctic.
