= Pseudophaeobacter arcticus =

Scientific classification
- Domain: Bacteria
- Kingdom: Pseudomonadati
- Phylum: Pseudomonadota
- Class: Alphaproteobacteria
- Order: Rhodobacterales
- Family: Rhodobacteraceae
- Genus: Pseudophaeobacter
- Species: P. arcticus

Binomial name
- Pseudophaeobacter arcticus (Zhang et al. 2008) Breider et al. 2014

Type strain
- 20188, CGMCC 1.6500, DSM 2356, JCM 14644

Synonyms
- Phaeobacter arcticus Zhang et al. 2008

Species of bacterium

Pseudophaeobacter arcticus is a psychrophilic, Gram-negative, rod-shaped and motile bacteria from the genus of Pseudophaeobacter which has been isolated from the Arctic.
