= Seohaeicola westpacificensis =

Scientific classification
- Domain: Bacteria
- Kingdom: Pseudomonadati
- Phylum: Pseudomonadota
- Class: Alphaproteobacteria
- Order: Rhodobacterales
- Family: Rhodobacteraceae
- Genus: Seohaeicola
- Species: S. westpacificensis

Binomial name
- Seohaeicola westpacificensis

Species of bacterium

Seohaeicola westpacificensis is a Gram-negative and aerobic bacterium from the genus of Seohaeicola which has been isolated from seawater from the western Pacific.
