= Pseudoruegeria aestuarii =

Scientific classification
- Domain: Bacteria
- Kingdom: Pseudomonadati
- Phylum: Pseudomonadota
- Class: Alphaproteobacteria
- Order: Rhodobacterales
- Family: Rhodobacteraceae
- Genus: Pseudoruegeria
- Species: P. aestuarii

Binomial name
- Pseudoruegeria aestuarii (Park et al. 2015) Cha et al. 2016

Type strain
- JCM 30751, KCCM 43133

Synonyms
- Pseudoruegeria litorea

Species of bacterium

Pseudoruegeria aestuarii is a Gram-negative, rod-shaped, aerobic and non-motile bacterium from the genus of Pseudoruegeria which has been isolated from tidal flat sediments from Muuido in Korea.
