= Actibacterium atlanticum =

Scientific classification
- Domain: Bacteria
- Kingdom: Pseudomonadati
- Phylum: Pseudomonadota
- Class: Alphaproteobacteria
- Order: Rhodobacterales
- Family: Rhodobacteraceae
- Genus: Actibacterium
- Species: A. atlanticum

Binomial name
- Actibacterium atlanticum Li et al. 2015

Type strain
- LMG 27158, MCCC 1A09298, strain 22II-S11-z10

Species of bacterium

Actibacterium atlanticum is a Gram-negative and non-motile bacterium from the genus of Actibacterium which has been isolated from seawater from the Atlantic Ocean.
