= Roseivivax halotolerans =

Scientific classification
- Domain: Bacteria
- Kingdom: Pseudomonadati
- Phylum: Pseudomonadota
- Class: Alphaproteobacteria
- Order: Rhodobacterales
- Family: Rhodobacteraceae
- Genus: Roseivivax
- Species: R. halotolerans

Binomial name
- Roseivivax halotolerans Suzuki et al. 1999

Species of bacterium

Roseivivax halotolerans is a species of bacteria. It is aerobic and bacteriochlorophyll-containing, first isolated from the epiphytes on the stromatolites of a saline lake located on the west coast of Australia. It is chemoheterotrophic, Gram-negative, motile, rod-shaped and with subpolar flagella. Its type strain is OCh 210^{T} (= JCM 10271^{T}).
