= Lutimaribacter pacificus =

Scientific classification
- Domain: Bacteria
- Kingdom: Pseudomonadati
- Phylum: Pseudomonadota
- Class: Alphaproteobacteria
- Order: Rhodobacterales
- Family: Rhodobacteraceae
- Genus: Lutimaribacter
- Species: L. pacificus

Binomial name
- Lutimaribacter pacificus (Yuan et al. 2009) Iwaki et al. 2013

Type strain
- CCTCC AB 208224, LMG 24619, MCCC 1A01034

Synonyms
- Oceanicola pacifica

Species of bacterium

Lutimaribacter pacificus is a bacterium from the genus of Lutimaribacter which has been isolated from the Pacific Ocean.
