= Roseibacula =

Scientific classification
- Domain: Bacteria
- Kingdom: Pseudomonadati
- Phylum: Pseudomonadota
- Class: Alphaproteobacteria
- Order: Rhodobacterales
- Family: Rhodobacteraceae
- Genus: Roseibacula; Nuyanzina-Boldareva and Gorlenko 2014

Species
- "R. alcaliphilum"

Genus of bacteria

"Roseibacula" is an aerobic, alkaliphilic and non-motile genus of bacteria from the family of Rhodobacteraceae with one known species ("Roseibacula alcaliphilum"). Roseibacula alcaliphilum has been isolated from water from the lake Doroninskoe in Russia.
