= Celeribacter baekdonensis =

Scientific classification
- Domain: Bacteria
- Kingdom: Pseudomonadati
- Phylum: Pseudomonadota
- Class: Alphaproteobacteria
- Order: Rhodobacterales
- Family: Rhodobacteraceae
- Genus: Celeribacter
- Species: C. baekdonensis

Binomial name
- Celeribacter baekdonensis Lee et al. 2012

Type strain
- CCUG 60799, DSM 27375, KCTC 23497, strain L-6

Species of bacterium

Celeribacter baekdonensis is a Gram-negative and non-motile bacterium from the genus of Celeribacter which has been isolated from seawater from the Sea of Japan of Korea.
