= Actibacterium naphthalenivorans =

Scientific classification
- Domain: Bacteria
- Kingdom: Pseudomonadati
- Phylum: Pseudomonadota
- Class: Alphaproteobacteria
- Order: Rhodobacterales
- Family: Rhodobacteraceae
- Genus: Actibacterium
- Species: A. naphthalenivorans

Binomial name
- Actibacterium naphthalenivorans Jeong et al. 2015

Type strain
- JCM 30828, KCTC 18418, strain NS6

Synonyms
- Confluentimicrobium naphthalenivorans Jeong et al. 2015

Species of bacterium

Actibacterium naphthalenivorans is a Gram-negative, aerobic, naphthalene-degrading, moderately halophilic and motile bacterium from the genus Actibacterium with a single flagellum which has been isolated from tidal flat sediments from the South Sea in Korea.
