= Lutimaribacter litoralis =

Scientific classification
- Domain: Bacteria
- Kingdom: Pseudomonadati
- Phylum: Pseudomonadota
- Class: Alphaproteobacteria
- Order: Rhodobacterales
- Family: Rhodobacteraceae
- Genus: Lutimaribacter
- Species: L. litoralis

Binomial name
- Lutimaribacter litoralis Iwaki et al. 2013

Type strain
- JCM 17792, KCTC 23660, strain KU5D5

Species of bacterium

Lutimaribacter litoralis is a Gram-negative, aerobic, pleomorphic, rod-shaped and non-motile bacterium from the genus of Lutimaribacter which has been isolated from seawater from the coast of the Goto Islands in Japan
