= Seohaeicola zhoushanensis =

Scientific classification
- Domain: Bacteria
- Kingdom: Pseudomonadati
- Phylum: Pseudomonadota
- Class: Alphaproteobacteria
- Order: Rhodobacterales
- Family: Rhodobacteraceae
- Genus: Seohaeicola
- Species: S. zhoushanensis

Binomial name
- Seohaeicola zhoushanensis Wang et al. 2016

Type strain
- KCTC 42650, MCCC 1K01157, NF48

Species of bacterium

Seohaeicola zhoushanensis is a Gram-negative, facultatively anaerobic and motile bacterium from the genus of Seohaeicola which has been isolated from seawater from the Zhoushan Islands.
