= Shimia marina =

Scientific classification
- Domain: Bacteria
- Kingdom: Pseudomonadati
- Phylum: Pseudomonadota
- Class: Alphaproteobacteria
- Order: Rhodobacterales
- Family: Rhodobacteraceae
- Genus: Shimia
- Species: S. marina

Binomial name
- Shimia marina Choi and Cho 2006

Type strain
- CECT 7688, DSM 26895, JCM 13038

Species of bacterium

Shimia marina is a bacterium from the genus of Shimia which has been isolated from biofilm from a coastal fish farm from Tongyeong in Korea.
