= Tropicimonas isoalkanivorans =

Scientific classification
- Domain: Bacteria
- Kingdom: Pseudomonadati
- Phylum: Pseudomonadota
- Class: Alphaproteobacteria
- Order: Rhodobacterales
- Family: Rhodobacteraceae
- Genus: Tropicimonas
- Species: T. isoalkanivorans

Binomial name
- Tropicimonas isoalkanivorans Harwati et al. 2009

Type strain
- B51, DSM 1954, JCM 14837

Species of bacterium

Tropicimonas isoalkanivorans is a Gram-negative, aerobic, rod-shaped and motile bacterium from the genus of Tropicimonas which has been isolated from seawater from the Semarang Port in Indonesia.
