= Celeribacter naphthalenivorans =

Scientific classification
- Domain: Bacteria
- Kingdom: Pseudomonadati
- Phylum: Pseudomonadota
- Class: Alphaproteobacteria
- Order: Rhodobacterales
- Family: Rhodobacteraceae
- Genus: Celeribacter
- Species: C. naphthalenivorans

Binomial name
- Celeribacter naphthalenivorans Taek oh et al. 2015

Type strain
- JCM 30679, KACC 18393, strain EMB201

Species of bacterium

Celeribacter naphthalenivorans is a Gram-negative, naphthalene-degrading, moderately halophilic, aerobic and motile bacterium from the genus of Celeribacter with a polar flagellum which has been isolated from tidal flat sediments from the South Sea in Korea.
