= Nioella aestuarii =

Scientific classification
- Domain: Bacteria
- Kingdom: Pseudomonadati
- Phylum: Pseudomonadota
- Class: Alphaproteobacteria
- Order: Rhodobacterales
- Family: Rhodobacteraceae
- Genus: Nioella
- Species: N. aestuarii

Binomial name
- Nioella aestuarii Cha et al. 2017

Type strain
- JCM 30752, KCCM 43135, strain MME-018

Species of bacterium

Nioella aestuarii is a bacterium from the genus of Nioella which has been isolated from tidal flat sediments from Muuido in Korea.
