= Limimaricola cinnabarinus =

Scientific classification
- Domain: Bacteria
- Kingdom: Pseudomonadati
- Phylum: Pseudomonadota
- Class: Alphaproteobacteria
- Order: Rhodobacterales
- Family: Rhodobacteraceae
- Genus: Limimaricola
- Species: L. cinnabarinus

Binomial name
- Limimaricola cinnabarinus (Tsubouchi et al. 2013)Wirth and Whitman 2018

Synonyms
- Loktanella cinnabarina Loktanella rubeus

Species of bacterium

Limimaricola cinnabarinus is a Gram-negative, aerobic, halotolerant and heterotrophic bacterium from the genus of Limimaricola which has been isolated from deep-sea sediments from the Shimokita Peninsula in Japan.
