= Primorskyibacter =

Scientific classification
- Domain: Bacteria
- Kingdom: Pseudomonadati
- Phylum: Pseudomonadota
- Class: Alphaproteobacteria
- Order: Rhodobacterales
- Family: Rhodobacteraceae
- Genus: Primorskyibacter; Romanenko et al. 2011

Type species
- Primorskyibacter sedentarius

Species
- P. aestuariivivens P. insulae P. sedentarius

Genus of bacteria

Primorskyibacter is a genus of bacteria from the family of Rhodobacteraceae.
