= Aestuariihabitans beolgyonensis =

Scientific classification
- Domain: Bacteria
- Kingdom: Pseudomonadati
- Phylum: Pseudomonadota
- Class: Alphaproteobacteria
- Order: Rhodobacterales
- Family: Rhodobacteraceae
- Genus: Aestuariihabitans
- Species: A. beolgyonensis

Binomial name
- Aestuariihabitans beolgyonensis Yoon et al. 2014

Type strain
- CCUG 63829, KCTC 32324, BB-MW15

Synonyms
- Aestuariihabitans tegillarcae

Species of bacterium

Aestuariihabitans beolgyonensis is a Gram-negative, rod-shaped and non-motile bacterium from the genus of Aestuariihabitans which has been isolated from tidal flat from the southern coast of Korea.
