= Monaibacterium =

Scientific classification
- Domain: Bacteria
- Kingdom: Pseudomonadati
- Phylum: Pseudomonadota
- Class: Alphaproteobacteria
- Order: Rhodobacterales
- Family: Rhodobacteraceae
- Genus: Monaibacterium; Chernikova et al. 2017

Type species
- Monaibacterium marinum

Species
- M. marinum

Genus of bacteria

Monaibacterium is a Gram-negative and aerobic genus of bacteria from the family of Rhodobacteraceae with one known species (Monaibacterium marinum). Monaibacterium marinum has been isolated from seawater from the Menai Strait.
