= Nioella sediminis =

Scientific classification
- Domain: Bacteria
- Kingdom: Pseudomonadati
- Phylum: Pseudomonadota
- Class: Alphaproteobacteria
- Order: Rhodobacterales
- Family: Rhodobacteraceae
- Genus: Nioella
- Species: N. sediminis

Binomial name
- Nioella sediminis Liu et al. 2017

Type strain
- KCTC 42144, MCCC 1A00710, strain JS7-11

Species of prokaryote

Nioella sediminis is a Gram-negative, short-rod-shaped and non-motile bacterium in the genus Nioella which has been isolated from sediments from the Jiulong River, China.
