= Pseudoruegeria lutimaris =

Scientific classification
- Domain: Bacteria
- Kingdom: Pseudomonadati
- Phylum: Pseudomonadota
- Class: Alphaproteobacteria
- Order: Rhodobacterales
- Family: Rhodobacteraceae
- Genus: Pseudoruegeria
- Species: P. lutimaris

Binomial name
- Pseudoruegeria lutimaris Jung et al. 2010

Type strain
- CCUG 57754, DSM 25294, KCTC 22690

Synonyms
- Pseudoruegeria lutimarina

Species of bacterium

Pseudoruegeria lutimaris is a Gram-negative, rod-shaped and non-motile bacterium from the genus of Pseudoruegeria which has been isolated from tidal flat sediments from Hwang-do in Korea.
