= Pelagimonas =

Scientific classification
- Domain: Bacteria
- Kingdom: Pseudomonadati
- Phylum: Pseudomonadota
- Class: Alphaproteobacteria
- Order: Rhodobacterales
- Family: Rhodobacteraceae
- Genus: Pelagimonas; Hahnke et al. 2013

Type species
- Pelagimonas varians

Species
- P. varians

Genus of bacteria

Pelagimonas is a Gram-negative, heterotrophic and aerobic genus of bacteria from the family of Rhodobacteraceae with one known species (Pelagimonas varians). Pelagimonas varians has been isolated from seawater from the North Sea in Germany.
