= Salinovum =

Scientific classification
- Domain: Bacteria
- Kingdom: Pseudomonadati
- Phylum: Pseudomonadota
- Class: Alphaproteobacteria
- Order: Rhodobacterales
- Family: Rhodobacteraceae
- Genus: Salinovum; Qu et al. 2017

Type species
- Salinovum rubellum

Species
- S. rubellum

Genus of bacteria

Salinovum is a Gram-negative and aerobic genus of bacteria from the family of Rhodobacteraceae with one known species (Salinovum rubellum). Salinovum rubellum has been isolated from sediments from a saltern from Jimo-Daqiao in China.
