= Aestuariicoccus =

Scientific classification
- Domain: Bacteria
- Kingdom: Pseudomonadati
- Phylum: Pseudomonadota
- Class: Alphaproteobacteria
- Order: Rhodobacterales
- Family: Rhodobacteraceae
- Genus: Aestuariicoccus; Feng et al. 2018

Type species
- Aestuariicoccus marinus

Species
- A. marinus

Genus of bacteria

Aestuariicoccus is a Gram-negative and strictly aerobic genus of bacteria from the family of Rhodobacteraceae with one known species (Aestuariicoccus marinus). Aestuariicoccus marinus has been isolated from tidal flat sediments from the Yellow Sea in Korea.
