= Pseudorhodobacter =

Scientific classification
- Domain: Bacteria
- Kingdom: Pseudomonadati
- Phylum: Pseudomonadota
- Class: Alphaproteobacteria
- Order: Rhodobacterales
- Family: Rhodobacteraceae
- Genus: Pseudorhodobacter; Uchino et al. 2003

Type species
- Pseudorhodobacter ferrugineus (Rüger and Höfle 1992) Uchino et al. 2003

Species
- Pseudorhodobacter antarcticus Chen et al. 2013; Pseudorhodobacter aquimaris Jung et al. 2012; Pseudorhodobacter ferrugineus (Rüger and Höfle 1992) Uchino et al. 2003; Pseudorhodobacter wandonensis Lee et al. 2013

Synonyms
- Pseudorhodobacter Uchino et al. 2003 emend. Jung et al. 2012

Genus of bacteria

Pseudorhodobacter is a genus of bacteria in the family Rhodobacteraceae.
