= Roseinatronobacter =

Scientific classification
- Domain: Bacteria
- Kingdom: Pseudomonadati
- Phylum: Pseudomonadota
- Class: Alphaproteobacteria
- Order: Rhodobacterales
- Family: Paracoccaceae
- Genus: Roseinatronobacter; Sorokin et al. 2000

Species
- Roseinatronobacter monicus; Roseinatronobacter thiooxidans

Genus of bacteria

Roseinatronobacter is a genus of bacteria in the family Paracoccaceae.
