= Haematobacter =

Scientific classification
- Domain: Bacteria
- Kingdom: Pseudomonadati
- Phylum: Pseudomonadota
- Class: Alphaproteobacteria
- Order: Rhodobacterales
- Family: Paracoccaceae
- Genus: Haematobacter; Helsel et al. 2007

Species
- Haematobacter missouriensis

Genus of bacteria

Haematobacter is a genus of bacteria in the family Paracoccaceae.
