= Methylarcula =

Scientific classification
- Domain: Bacteria
- Kingdom: Pseudomonadati
- Phylum: Pseudomonadota
- Class: Alphaproteobacteria
- Order: Rhodobacterales
- Family: Rhodobacteraceae
- Genus: Methylarcula; Doronina et al. 2000

Species
- Methylarcula terricola

Genus of bacteria

Methylarcula is a genus of bacteria in the family Rhodobacteraceae.
