= Acidimangrovimonas indica =

Scientific classification
- Domain: Bacteria
- Kingdom: Pseudomonadati
- Phylum: Pseudomonadota
- Class: Alphaproteobacteria
- Order: Rhodobacterales
- Family: Paracoccaceae
- Genus: Acidimangrovimonas
- Species: A. indica

Binomial name
- Acidimangrovimonas indica (Jiang et al. 2014) Ren et al. 2019

Type strain
- CGMCC 1.10859, JCM 17871, MCCC 1A01802, 20V17

Synonyms
- Defluviimonas indica Allgaiera indica

Species of bacterium

Acidimangrovimonas indica is a Gram-negative, strictly aerobic, chemoheterotrophic and motile bacterium from the genus of Acidimangrovimonas which has been isolated from a deep-sea hydrothermal vent from the Southwest Indian Ridge in China.
