= Acidimangrovimonas =

Scientific classification
- Domain: Bacteria
- Kingdom: Pseudomonadati
- Phylum: Pseudomonadota
- Class: Alphaproteobacteria
- Order: Rhodobacterales
- Family: Paracoccaceae
- Genus: Acidimangrovimonas; Ren et al. 2019

Type species
- Acidimangrovimonas sediminis

Species
- A. indica; A. pyrenivorans; A. sediminis

Genus of bacteria

Acidimangrovimonas is a bacterial genus from the family of Rhodobacteraceae.
