= Tabrizicola =

Scientific classification
- Domain: Bacteria
- Kingdom: Pseudomonadati
- Phylum: Pseudomonadota
- Class: Alphaproteobacteria
- Order: Rhodobacterales
- Family: Rhodobacteraceae
- Genus: Tabrizicola; Tarhriz et al. 2014

Type species
- Tabrizicola aquatica

Species
- T. aquatica T. fusiformis

Genus of bacteria

Tabrizicola is a genus of bacteria from the family of Rhodobacteraceae.
