= Xinfangfangia =

Scientific classification
- Domain: Bacteria
- Kingdom: Pseudomonadati
- Phylum: Pseudomonadota
- Class: Alphaproteobacteria
- Order: Rhodobacterales
- Family: Rhodobacteraceae
- Genus: Xinfangfangia; Hu et al. 2018

Type species
- Xinfangfangia soli

Species
- X. soli

Genus of bacteria

Xinfangfangia is a Gram-negative, rod-shaped and non-motile genus of bacteria from the family of Rhodobacteraceae with one known species (Xinfangfangia soli). Xinfangfangia soli has been isolated from soil which was contaminated with diuron near Nanjing in China.
