= Rubribacterium =

Scientific classification
- Domain: Bacteria
- Kingdom: Pseudomonadati
- Phylum: Pseudomonadota
- Class: Alphaproteobacteria
- Order: Rhodobacterales
- Family: Rhodobacteraceae
- Genus: Rubribacterium; Boldareva et al. 2010

Type species
- Rubribacterium polymorphum

Species
- R. polymorphum

Genus of bacteria

Rubribacterium is an alkaliphilic genus of bacteria from the family of Rhodobacteraceae. Rubribacterium polymorphum has been isolated from a Siberian soda lake.
