= Pararhodobacter =

Scientific classification
- Domain: Bacteria
- Kingdom: Pseudomonadati
- Phylum: Pseudomonadota
- Class: Alphaproteobacteria
- Order: Rhodobacterales
- Family: Rhodobacteraceae
- Genus: Pararhodobacter; Foesel et al. 2013

Type species
- Pararhodobacter aggregans

Species
- P. aggregans

Genus of bacteria

Pararhodobacter is a Gram-negative genus of bacteria from the family of Rhodobacteraceae with one known species (Pararhodobacter aggregans). Pararhodobacter aggregans has been isolated from a marine aquaculture system from Rehovot in Israel.
