= Alkalilacustris =

Scientific classification
- Domain: Bacteria
- Kingdom: Pseudomonadati
- Phylum: Pseudomonadota
- Class: Alphaproteobacteria
- Order: Rhodobacterales
- Family: Rhodobacteraceae
- Genus: Alkalilacustris; Zhang et al. 2019

Type species
- Alkalilacustris brevis

Species
- A. brevis

Genus of bacteria

Alkalilacustris is a Gram-negative, aerobic and short-rod-shaped bacterial genus from the family Rhodobacteraceae with one known species (Alkalilacustris brevis). Alkalilacustris brevis has been isolated from water from a soda lake in Jili in China.
