= Albirhodobacter =

Scientific classification
- Domain: Bacteria
- Kingdom: Pseudomonadati
- Phylum: Pseudomonadota
- Class: Alphaproteobacteria
- Order: Rhodobacterales
- Family: Rhodobacteraceae
- Genus: Albirhodobacter; Nupur et al. 2015

Type species
- Albirhodobacter marinus

Species
- A. confluentis A. marinus

Genus of bacteria

Albirhodobacter is a bacterial genus from the family of Rhodobacteraceae.

On marine broth, the colonies of Albirhodobacter marinus are circular, convex, translucent, and whitish to light cream in color.
