= Gemmobacter =

Scientific classification
- Domain: Bacteria
- Kingdom: Pseudomonadati
- Phylum: Pseudomonadota
- Class: Alphaproteobacteria
- Order: Rhodobacterales
- Family: Rhodobacteraceae
- Genus: Gemmobacter; Rothe et al. 1988

Type species
- Gemmobacter aquatilis Rothe et al. 1988

Species
- G. aestuarii Hameed et al. 2020; G. aquarius Baek et al. 2020; G. aquaticus Chen et al. 2013; G. aquatilis Rothe et al. 1988; G. caeni (Zheng et al. 2011) Chen et al. 2013; G. caeruleus Qu et al. 2020; G. fontiphilus Chen et al. 2013; G. intermedius Kämpfer et al. 2015; G. lanyuensis Sheu et al. 2013; G. lutimaris Yoo et al. 2019; G. megaterium Liu et al. 2014; G. nanjingensis (Zhang et al. 2012) Chen et al. 2013; G. nectariphilus (Tanaka et al. 2004) Chen et al. 2013; G. serpentinus Lim et al. 2020; G. straminiformis Kang et al. 2017; G. tilapiae Sheu et al. 2013

Synonyms
- Catellatibacterium [sic] Tanaka et al. 2004; Catellibacterium Tanaka et al. 2004; Wagnerdoeblera Hördt et al. 2020; "Falsigemmobacter" Li et al. 2020

Genus of bacteria

Gemmobacter is a genus of bacteria from the family of Rhodobacteraceae.
