= Roseicitreum =

Scientific classification
- Domain: Bacteria
- Kingdom: Pseudomonadati
- Phylum: Pseudomonadota
- Class: Alphaproteobacteria
- Order: Rhodobacterales
- Family: Paracoccaceae
- Genus: Roseicitreum; Yu et al. 2011

Type species
- Roseicitreum antarcticum

Species
- R. antarcticum

Genus of bacteria

Roseicitreum is a Gram-negative, aerobic and non-motile genus of bacteria from the family of Rhodobacteraceae with one known species (Roseicitreum antarcticum). Roseicitreum antarcticum has been isolated from sediments from the Zhongshan Station from the Antarctica.
