= Arenibacillus =

Scientific classification
- Domain: Bacteria
- Kingdom: Pseudomonadati
- Phylum: Pseudomonadota
- Class: Alphaproteobacteria
- Order: Rhodobacterales
- Family: Rhodobacteraceae
- Genus: Arenibacillus; Kim et al. 2019

Type species
- Arenibacillus arenosus

Species
- A. arenosus

Genus of bacteria

Arenibacillus is a Gram-negative, aerobic, rod-shaped and non-motile bacterial genus from the family Rhodobacteraceae with one known species (Arenibacillus arenosus). Arenibacillus arenosus has been isolated from sand.
