= Rubrimonas =

Scientific classification
- Domain: Bacteria
- Kingdom: Pseudomonadati
- Phylum: Pseudomonadota
- Class: Alphaproteobacteria
- Order: Rhodobacterales
- Family: Rhodobacteraceae
- Genus: Rubrimonas; Suzuki et al. 1999

Species
- Rubrimonas cliftonensis

Genus of bacteria

Rubrimonas is a genus of bacteria in the family Rhodobacteraceae.
