= Halovulum =

Scientific classification
- Domain: Bacteria
- Kingdom: Pseudomonadati
- Phylum: Pseudomonadota
- Class: Alphaproteobacteria
- Order: Rhodobacterales
- Family: Rhodobacteraceae
- Genus: Halovulum; Sun et al. 2015

Type species
- Halovulum dunhuangense

Species
- H. dunhuangense

Genus of bacteria

Halovulum is a Gram-negative and aerobic genus of bacteria from the family of Rhodobacteraceae with one known species (Halovulum dunhuangense). Halovulum dunhuangense has been isolated from a spring from Dunhuang in China.
