= Limibaculum =

Scientific classification
- Domain: Bacteria
- Kingdom: Pseudomonadati
- Phylum: Pseudomonadota
- Class: Alphaproteobacteria
- Order: Rhodobacterales
- Family: Rhodobacteraceae
- Genus: Limibaculum; Shin et al. 2017

Type species
- Limibaculum halophilum

Species
- L. halophilum

Genus of bacteria

Limibaculum is a Gram-negative genus of bacteria from the family of Rhodobacteraceae with one known species (Limibaculum halophilum). Limibaculum halophilum has been isolated from mud.
