= Falsirhodobacter =

Scientific classification
- Domain: Bacteria
- Kingdom: Pseudomonadati
- Phylum: Pseudomonadota
- Class: Alphaproteobacteria
- Order: Rhodobacterales
- Family: Rhodobacteraceae
- Genus: Falsirhodobacter; Subhash et al. 2013

Type species
- Falsirhodobacter halotolerans

Species
- F. deserti F. halotolerans

Genus of bacteria

Falsirhodobacter is a genus of bacteria from the family of Rhodobacteraceae.
