= Oceanicella =

Scientific classification
- Domain: Bacteria
- Kingdom: Pseudomonadati
- Phylum: Pseudomonadota
- Class: Alphaproteobacteria
- Order: Rhodobacterales
- Family: Rhodobacteraceae
- Genus: Oceanicella; Albuquerque et al. 2012

Type species
- Oceanicella actignis Albuquerque et al. 2012

Species
- O. actignis

Synonyms
- Pleomorphobacterium Yin et al. 2013

Genus of bacteria

Oceanicella is a genus of bacteria from the family Rhodobacteraceae with one known species (Oceanicella actignis).
