= Frigidibacter =

Scientific classification
- Domain: Bacteria
- Kingdom: Pseudomonadati
- Phylum: Pseudomonadota
- Class: Alphaproteobacteria
- Order: Rhodobacterales
- Family: Rhodobacteraceae
- Genus: Frigidibacter; Li and Zhou 2015

Type species
- Frigidibacter albus

Species
- F. albus

Genus of bacteria

Frigidibacter is a Gram-negative and strictly aerobic genus of bacteria from the family of Rhodobacteraceae with one known species (Frigidibacter albus). Frigidibacter albus has been isolated from water from a lake from Xinjiang in China.
