= Defluviimonas =

Scientific classification
- Domain: Bacteria
- Kingdom: Pseudomonadati
- Phylum: Pseudomonadota
- Class: Alphaproteobacteria
- Order: Rhodobacterales
- Family: Rhodobacteraceae
- Genus: Defluviimonas; Foesel et al. 2013

Type species
- Defluviimonas denitrificans

Species
- D. aestuarii D. alba D. aquaemixtae D. denitrificans D. nitratireducens

Genus of bacteria

Defluviimonas is a genus of bacteria from the family of Rhodobacteraceae.
