= Amaricoccus =

Scientific classification
- Domain: Bacteria
- Kingdom: Pseudomonadati
- Phylum: Pseudomonadota
- Class: Alphaproteobacteria
- Order: Rhodobacterales
- Family: Rhodobacteraceae
- Genus: Amaricoccus; Maszenan et al. 1997

Species
- Amaricoccus kaplicensis; Amaricoccus macauensis; Amaricoccus tamworthensis; Amaricoccus veronensis

Genus of bacteria

Amaricoccus is a genus of bacteria in the family Rhodobacteraceae.
