= Rhodobaculum =

Scientific classification
- Domain: Bacteria
- Kingdom: Pseudomonadati
- Phylum: Pseudomonadota
- Class: Alphaproteobacteria
- Order: Rhodobacterales
- Family: Rhodobacteraceae
- Genus: Rhodobaculum; Bryantseva et al. 2015

Type species
- Rhodobaculum claviforme

Species
- R. claviforme

Genus of bacteria

Rhodobaculum is an alkaliphilic genus of bacteria from the family of Rhodobacteraceae with one known species (Rhodobaculum claviforme). Rhodobaculum claviforme has been isolated from saline alkaline steppe lakes from Siberia.
