= Thioclava =

Scientific classification
- Domain: Bacteria
- Kingdom: Pseudomonadati
- Phylum: Pseudomonadota
- Class: Alphaproteobacteria
- Order: Rhodobacterales
- Family: Rhodobacteraceae
- Genus: Thioclava; Sorokin et al. 2005

Species
- Thioclava atlantica Lai et al. 2015; Thioclava dalianensis Zhang et al. 2013; Thioclava indica Liu et al. 2015; Thioclava marina corrig. Liu et al. 2017; Thioclava nitratireducens Liu et al. 2017; Thioclava pacifica Sorokin et al. 2005; Thioclava sediminum Liu et al. 2017

Genus of bacteria

Thioclava is a genus of bacteria in the family Rhodobacteraceae.
