= Meinhardsimonia xiamenensis =

Scientific classification
- Domain: Bacteria
- Kingdom: Pseudomonadati
- Phylum: Pseudomonadota
- Class: Alphaproteobacteria
- Order: Rhodobacterales
- Family: Roseobacteraceae
- Genus: Meinhardsimonia
- Species: M. xiamenensis

Binomial name
- Meinhardsimonia xiamenensis (Yin et al. 2012) Hördt et al. 2020

Type strain
- CGMCC 1.10789, LMG 26247, MCCC 1A06317, YBY-7

Synonyms
- Albidovulum xiamenense Yin et al. 2012

Species of bacterium

Meinhardsimonia xiamenensis is a moderately thermophilic, rod-shaped, aerobic and motile bacteria from the genus of Meinhardsimonia which has been isolated from water from a hot spring from Xiamen in China.
