= Neomegalonema =

Scientific classification
- Domain: Bacteria
- Kingdom: Pseudomonadati
- Phylum: Pseudomonadota
- Class: Alphaproteobacteria
- Order: Rhodobacterales
- Family: Neomegalonemataceae; Hördt et al. 2020
- Genus: Neomegalonema; Oren 2017
- Species: N. perideroedes

Binomial name
- Neomegalonema perideroedes (Thomsen et al. 2006) Oren 2017

Type strain
- ATCC BAA-740, DSM 15528, Gr1

Synonyms
- Genus: Meganema Thomsen et al. 2006; Species: "Candidatus Meganema perideroedes" Nielsen et al. 2003; "Candidatus Neomegalonema perideroedes" corrig. Nielsen et al. 2003; Meganema perideroedes Thomsen et al. 2006

Genus of bacteria

Neomegalonema is a genus of bacteria. Up to now there is only one species of this genus known, Neomegalonema perideroedes.

Neomegalonema perideroedes is a filamentous bacterium which has been isolated from activated bulking sludge from industrial wastewater in Grindsted in Denmark.
