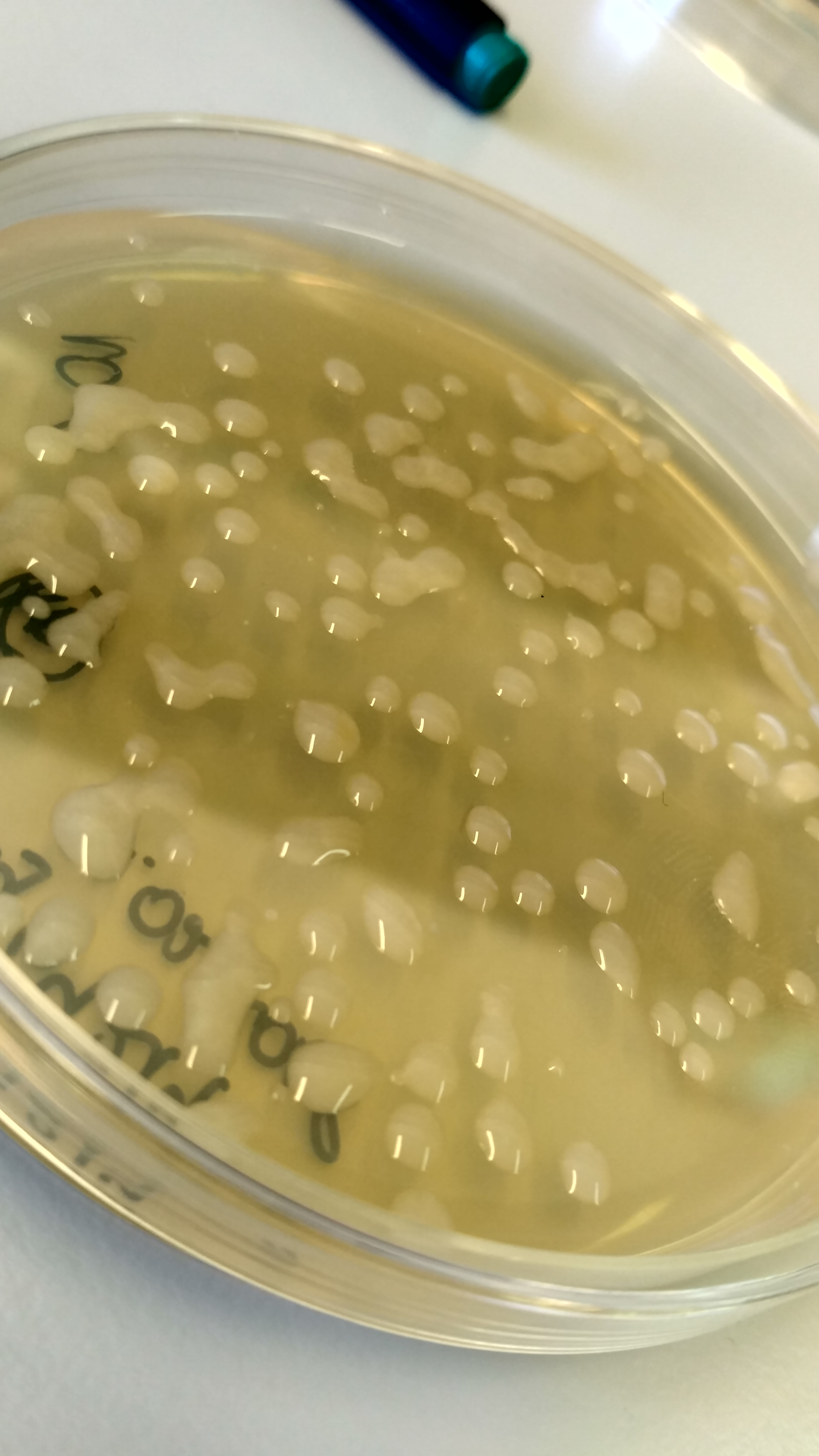
- Colonies of Paracoccus yeei

Scientific classification
- Domain: Bacteria
- Kingdom: Pseudomonadati
- Phylum: Pseudomonadota
- Class: Alphaproteobacteria
- Order: Rhodobacterales
- Family: Paracoccaceae; Liang et al. 2022

= Paracoccaceae =

Family of bacteria

The Paracoccaceae are a family of bacteria. The family comprises bacteria that are often found in marine habitats and shows great metabolic and ecological diversity. Species also occur in other habitats, such as fresh water, soil (e.g. species of Paracoccus) or wastewater (Amaricoccus). Some depend on oxygen, i.e. they are strictly aerobic. Others are facultatively anaerobic, meaning they also grow in the absence of oxygen. Many species can use photosynthesis. Some members were formerly assigned to the family Rhodobacteraceae. That family was dissolved and its genera were distributed among several families.

== Characteristics ==
The members of the family Paracoccaceae are Gram-negative bacteria, which means that they stain red or pink in the Gram stain. They can occur in various shapes, including coccoid (spherical) and rod-shaped.

Some members are flagellated and motile; non-flagellated representatives, such as Methylarcula, also exist. Some species reproduce by budding. Instead of the binary fission typical of most bacterial species, in which two cells of more or less the same shape and size are formed, an initially smaller daughter cell forms and remains attached to the mother cell for some time. The daughter cell does not grow uniformly but in a polar manner, at one specific point. The budding species include, for example, Rhodobacter blasticus and Gemmobacter aquatilis.

== Metabolism ==
The Paracoccaceae are characterised by a versatile metabolism. Many species are able to use a wide range of organic compounds under aerobic and anaerobic conditions. Methylotrophic species, which use e.g. methylamine to obtain energy, are also present.

Several species are photoheterotrophic, i.e. they use light energy and additionally require organic compounds. Photoautotrophic bacteria are also present.

The phototrophic species possess bacteriochlorophyll a and belong to the purple non-sulfur bacteria. They mostly use hydrogen sulfide (H_{2}S) as an electron donor, releasing sulfur as a product. Some species can then oxidise the sulfur further to sulfate and thereby gain energy once more. These include many species of Rhodobacter. Some species of the genus Roseinatronobacter possess relatively rare carotenoids known as demethylspheroidene and demethylspheroidenone.

Some species, e.g. many of Rhodobacter, are in addition able to grow photolithoautotrophically. For this they use reduced sulfur compounds (such as sulfide or thiosulfate) or hydrogen as electron donors and bicarbonate (when in water) or CO_{2} as the carbon source for building cell material; these compounds are fixed via the Calvin cycle.

Some genera are so-called "aerobic anoxygenic phototrophic bacteria" (AAPs). These organisms can carry out photosynthesis under aerobic conditions; however, carbon dioxide is not used in the process, and so they do not produce oxygen. They use light as an additional energy source, and organic substances are required as well. These include, for example, some species of Roseinatronobacter. Some are strictly heterotrophic bacteria. Some are also able to use sulfur compounds autotrophically. Denitrifying species are also present. To obtain energy, they convert the nitrogen bound in nitrate (NO_{3}^{−}) to molecular nitrogen (N_{2}). Paracoccus denitrificans is a model organism for the study of denitrification. Such bacteria play a role in the nitrogen cycle. Some species are also able to use aromatic hydrocarbons in their metabolism and thus degrade them.

The species Rhodobacter capsulatus (also referred to as Cereibacter sphaeroides) produces so-called "gene transfer agents" (GTAs). These are virus-like particles that are produced by the bacterium and can transfer genetic material between cells. Only a very small, random segment of the DNA is transferred. This results in horizontal gene transfer, which plays an important role in evolution. GTAs presumably arose from former temperate phages. Over time, the viruses lost the ability to replicate independently and became permanently integrated into the host cell.

Some species accumulate polyhydroxybutyrate (PHB) or various other polyhydroxyalkanoates (PHA), which serve as a reserve for periods of nutrient scarcity.

The following is a table of some example species:

Species of the family Paracoccaceae
Species	Isolation/habitat	Metabolism	Na⁺ requirement	Other notes	References
Defluviimonas denitrificans	Biofilter, marine aquaculture recirculation systems (Israel)	chemoorganoheterotrophic	No	-	Foesel et al., 2011
Gemmobacter aquatilis	Pond (USA)	facultatively anaerobic chemoorganoheterotrophic, denitrification under anaerobic conditions	No	-	Rothe et al., 1987
Gemmobacter changlensis	Snow, Himalayas (India)	photoheterotrophic (PH)	No	formerly Rhodobacter changlensis	Chen et al., 2013a; Anil Kumar et al., 2007
Haematobacter missouriensis	clinical blood samples from wounds	aerobic chemoorganotrophic	No	-	Helsel et al. 2007
Methylarcula marina	an estuary of the Sea of Azov, Russia	FMT	Yes	produces ectoine	Doronina et al. 2000
Paracoccus denitrificans	soil, wastewater, liquid manure, sewage sludge	facultatively chemolithoautotrophic	No	capable of denitrification	Ludwig et al. 1993
Pararhodobacter aggregans	in the biofilter of a marine aquaculture, Israel	aerobic, chemoorganotrophic	No	-	
Pseudorhodobacter ferrugineus	biofilter of a marine aquaculture	aerobic, chemoorganotrophic	No	-	
Rhodobacter capsulatus	stagnant fresh water, exposed to light, with reduced oxygen (USA, Cuba)	purple non-sulfur bacteria	No	-	Imhoff et al., 1984
Rhodobacter vinaykumarii	tidal seawater (India)	purple non-sulfur bacteria	Yes	-	Srinivas et al., 2007a
Rhodobacter viridis	river water and mud (India)	purple non-sulfur bacteria	No	-	Shalem Raj et al., 2013
Roseinatronobacter thiooxidans	soda lake in Siberia	aerobic anoxygenic phototroph	Yes	-	Sorokin et al. 2000
Roseitranquillus sediminis	sediment of Kongsfjorden, Ny-Ålesund, Svalbard	chemoorganoheterotrophic	Yes	-	Umar et al., 2021
Solirhodobacter olei	oil-contaminated soil from the Daqing oil field in China	chemolithoautotrophic with thiosulfate	No	-	Chu et al. 2020
Thioclava pacifica	in the vicinity of a sulfide-rich hydrothermal vent on the coast of Papua New Guinea	chemolithoautotrophic growth with sulfur compounds	Yes	-	Sorokin et al. 2005
Zongyanglinia marinus	from sediment in the Yellow Sea	strictly aerobic, reduces nitrate to N_{2}	Yes	-	Chu et al. 2020

Abbreviations:

- AAP: aerobic anoxygenic phototrophs
- FMT: facultatively methylotrophic

== Ecology ==
The Paracoccaceae occur in a wide variety of environments, including soil, fresh water and marine ecosystems. Their metabolic flexibility allows them to adapt to different ecological niches. Some occur in extreme environments. Species such as Roseinatronobacter bogoriensis and R. thiooxidans have been found in soda lakes. Other strains inhabit sulfidic hydrothermal areas (e.g. Thioclava pacifica) and hot springs (Pleomorphobacterium xiamenense).

== Applications ==
Members of the family Paracoccaceae have potential for biotechnological applications such as bioremediation and wastewater treatment. Through their denitrification capabilities they could contribute to the removal of nitrate from polluted ecosystems.

== Taxonomy ==
In 2022 the family Rhodobacteraceae was dissolved on the basis of genetic studies. On the basis of taxonomic studies, such as comparisons of ribosomal RNA, its members were distributed among the new families Roseobacteraceae, Stappiaceae, Ahrensiaceae and the Paracoccaceae. The genus Rhodobacter, which gave the original family its name, was placed in the Paracoccaceae.

The following is a list of some genera (as of December 2024):

- Abyssibius Wei et al. 2023
- Acidimangrovimonas Ren et al. 2019
- Albidovulum Albuquerque et al. 2003
- Albimonas Lim et al. 2008
- Albirhodobacter Nupur et al. 2015
- Alexandriicola Zhu et al. 2024
- Algicella Nedashkovskaya et al. 2023
- Alkalilacustris Zhang et al. 2019
- Allgaiera Hördt et al. 2020
- Alterinioella Kong et al. 2022
- Amaricoccus Maszenan et al. 1997
- Anianibacter Azpiazu-Muniozguren et al. 2023
- Arenibacillus Kim et al. 2019
- Cereibacter Suresh et al. 2015
- Cochlodiniinecator Le et al. 2021
- Coraliihabitans Sun et al. 2022
- Cypionkella Hördt et al. 2020
- Defluviimonas Foesel et al. 2013
- Falsigemmobacter Li et al. 2023
- Falsirhodobacter Subhash et al. 2013
- Fertoeibacter Szuróczki et al. 2021
- Fontisubflavum Xu et al. 2024
- Frigidibacter Li and Zhou 2015
- Fuscibacter Chhetri et al. 2023
- Gemmobacter Rothe et al. 1988
- Gymnodinialimonas Jiang et al. 2022
- Haematobacter Helsel et al. 2007
- Hahyoungchilella Kim and Lee 2020
- Halovulum Sun et al. 2015
- Harenicola Romanenko et al. 2022
- Heliomarina Kong et al. 2022
- Limibaculum Shin et al. 2017
- Mesobacterium Kong et al. 2022
- Mesobaculum Li et al. 2021
- Methylarcula Doronina et al. 2000
- Neotabrizicola Muramatsu et al. 2022
- Oceanicella Albuquerque et al. 2012
- Ostreiculturibacter Huang et al. 2024
- Paracoccus Davis 1969 (Approved Lists 1980)
- Paralimibaculum Kawano et al. 2024
- Pararhodobacter Foesel et al. 2013
- Paroceanicella Liu et al. 2020
- Phaeovulum Suresh et al. 2020
- Pikeienuella Park et al. 2022
- Pseudogemmobacter Suman et al. 2019
- Pseudorhodobacter Uchino et al. 2003
- Pseudothioclava Kim and Lee 2020
- Qingshengfaniella Wang et al. 2021
- Rhabdonatronobacter Zhou et al. 2023
- Rhodobacter Imhoff et al. 1984
- Rhodobaculum Bryantseva et al. 2015
- Roseicitreum Yu et al. 2011
- Roseinatronobacter Sorokin et al. 2000
- Roseitranquillus Umar et al. 2023
- Rubribacterium Boldareva et al. 2010
- Rubrimonas Suzuki et al. 1999
- Ruixingdingia Xu et al. 2024
- Salibaculum Zhu et al. 2021
- Solirhodobacter Chu et al. 2020
- Szabonella Szuróczki et al. 2022
- Tabrizicola Tarhriz et al. 2014
- Thermohalobaculum Pan et al. 2024
- Thioclava Sorokin et al. 2005
- Xinfangfangia Hu et al. 2018
