= Rhodobacterales =

Scientific classification
- Domain: Bacteria
- Kingdom: Pseudomonadati
- Phylum: Pseudomonadota
- Class: Alphaproteobacteria
- Order: Rhodobacterales; Garrity et al. 2006

Families
- Neomegalonemataceae Hördt et al. 2020; Paracoccaceae Liang et al. 2022; Roseobacteraceae Liang et al. 2021

Order of Alphaproteobacteria

Rhodobacterales are an order of the Alphaproteobacteria.

Gene transfer agents are viruslike elements produced by Rhodobacterales which transfer DNA and may be an important factor in their evolution.

== Etymology ==
From Greek rhodon, the rose, and bakterion, a rod. This refers to the colour of aerobic phototrophic cultures of this order of bacteria which can be pink or red due to the production of carotenoids.
