= S. indicus =

S. indicus may refer to:

- Sanajeh indicus, an extinct species of madtsoiid snake
- Scaposodus indicus, a species of longhorn beetle
- Scomber indicus, the Indian chub mackerel, a species of mackerel
- Sessiluncus indicus, a species of mite
- Simolestes indicus, an extinct pliosaurid species
- Sisyphus indicus, a species of dung beetle
- Sivapithecus indicus, a fossil primate species
- Sphaeranthus indicus, a species of flowering plant
- Sphenomorphus indicus, a species of skink
- Sporobolus indicus, smut grass, a species of grass
- Streptomyces indicus, a species of deep-sea bacterium
- Stolephorus indicus, the Indian anchovy, a species of ray-finned fish
- Symphylurinus indicus, a species of diplurans
- Synodus indicus, the Indian lizardfish, a species of bottom-dwelling fish
- Sypheotides indicus, the lesser florican, a species of terrestrial bird

== Synonyms ==
- Sauropus indicus, a synonym for Sauropus androgynus, the star gooseberry
- Scytaster indicus, a synonym for Fromia indica, the Indian sea star
- Stellio indicus, a synonym for Laudakia tuberculata, a lizard species
- Struthio indicus, a synonym for Struthio asiaticus, the extinct Asian ostrich

== See also ==
- Indicus (disambiguation)
