= D. indicus =

D. indicus may refer to:

- Deinococcus indicus, a species of arsenic-resistant bacterium
- Dendronanthus indicus, the forest wagtail, a medium-sized passerine bird
- Dipterocarpus indicus, a species of large tree
- Dohertyorsidis indicus, a species of longhorn beetle
- Dolycoris indicus, a species of shield bug
- Domibacillus indicus, a species of bacterium found in marine sediments
- Dynoides indicus, a species of isopod

== Synonyms ==
- Dihammus indicus, a synonym of Acalolepta indica, a species of longhorn beetle

== See also ==
- Indicus (disambiguation)
