= C. indicus =

C. indicus may refer to:

- Cajanus indicus, the pigeon pea, a perennial member of the family Fabaceae
- Calidifontibacter indicus, a species of spring water bacterium
- Caliothrips indicus, a species of thrips
- Caprimulgus indicus, the Indian jungle nightjar, a species of nightjar found in India and Sri Lanka
- Celeribacter indicus, a species of deep-sea bacterium
- Cephalodiscus indicus, a species of sessile hemichordate
- Chadefaudiomyces indicus, a species of fungus in the family Valsaceae
- Chlaenius indicus, a species of ground beetle
- Clyzomedus indicus, a species of longhorn beetle
- Cocculus indicus, the fruit of Anamirta cocculus, a source of picrotoxin, a poisonous alkaloid with stimulant properties
- Copelatus indicus, a species of diving beetle
- Cynosurus indicus, a grass species in the genus Cynosurus

== Synonyms ==
- Cottus indicus, a synonym of Aspidophoroides monopterygius

== See also ==
- Indicus (disambiguation)
