= H. indicus =

H. indicus may refer to:

- Harpalus indicus, a species of ground beetle
- Heliophorus indicus, the Indian purple sapphire, a species of small butterfly
- Hemidesmus indicus, the Indian sarsaparilla, a plant species found in South Asia
- Hoplolaimus indicus, a plant pathogenic nematode species
- Hyagnis indicus, a species of longhorn beetle

== Synonyms ==
- Heterorhabditis indicus, a synonym for Heterorhabditis indica, an insect pathogenic nematode species
- Helianthus indicus, a synonym for Helianthus annuus, the common sunflower
- Hepialus indicus, a synonym for Hepialiscus nepalensis, a species of ghost moth

== See also ==
- Indicus (disambiguation)
