= O. indicus =

O. indicus may refer to:

- Olenecamptus indicus, a species of longhorn beetle
- Omorgus indicus, a species of hide beetle
- Onustus indicus, a species of large sea snail
- Ophichthys indicus, the Bombay swamp eel
- Orthogonius indicus, a species of ground beetle
- Oryctocephalus indicus, a species of corynexochid trilobite

== Synonyms ==
- Odontotermes feae, a small species of earth dwelling termite

== See also ==
- Indicus (disambiguation)
