= A. indicus =

A. indicus may refer to:

- Acinetobacter indicus, a species of bacterium isolated from a hexachlorocyclohexane dump site
- Aedes indicus, a species complex of zoophilic mosquito
- Agromyces indicus, a species of bacterium isolated from mangroves sediments
- Alectis indicus, the Indian threadfish, a fish species
- Amblyglyphidodon indicus, the pale damselfish, a dragonfly species
- Anax indicus, a species of dragonfly
- Ankistrodon indicus, an extinct species of archosauriform
- Anser indicus, the bar-headed goose, a goose species which breeds in Central Asia in colonies of thousands near mountain lakes
- Antennarius indicus, a species of frogfish
- Apristurus indicus, the smallbelly catshark, a shark species found in the western Indian Ocean
- Armatophallus indicus, a species of twirler moth
- Attagenus indicus, a species of carpet beetle
- Australentulus indicus, a species of proturan

== Synonyms ==
- Acrocephalus indicus, a heterotypic synonym of Platostoma hispidum
- Albicoccus indicus, a synonym of Abyssicoccus albus
- Altererythrobacter indicus, a synonym of Altericroceibacterium indicum
- Aspergillus indicus, a synonym of Aspergillus jaipurensis

== See also ==
- Indicus (disambiguation)
