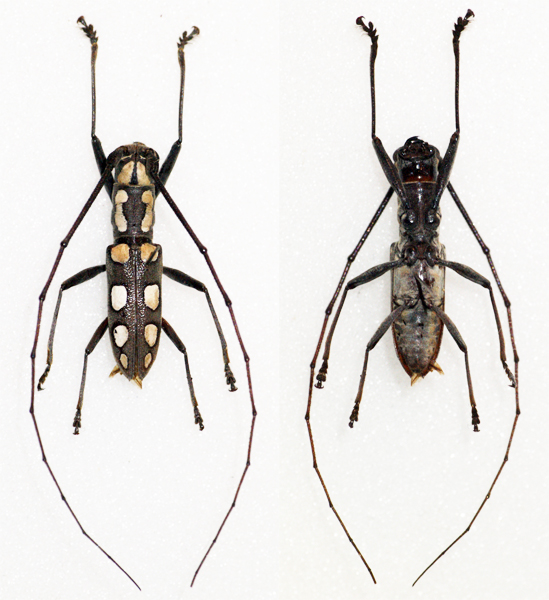
- Preserved specimen of olenecamptus optatus (top and bottom view)

Scientific classification
- Kingdom: Animalia
- Phylum: Arthropoda
- Clade: Pancrustacea
- Class: Insecta
- Order: Coleoptera
- Suborder: Polyphaga
- Infraorder: Cucujiformia
- Family: Cerambycidae
- Genus: Olenecamptus
- Species: O. vittaticollis

Binomial name
- Olenecamptus vittaticollis Heller, 1923

Synonyms
- Olenecamptus affinis m. vittaticollis (Heller) Breuning, 1940; Olenecamptus optatus vittaticollis Heller, 1923

= Olenecamptus vittaticollis =

Species of beetle

Olenecamptus vittaticollis is a species of beetle in the family Cerambycidae. It was described by Heller in 1923, originally as a subspecies of Olenecamptus optatus. It is known from the Philippines. It contains the varietas Olenecamptus vittaticollis var. divisus.
