= L. indicus =

L. indicus may refer to:

- Laevisuchus indicus, a dinosaur species of the Late Cretaceous
- Lametasaurus indicus, a nomen dubium
- Lethocerus indicus, a giant water bug species native to Southeast Asia
- Lutjanus indicus, the striped snapper, a species of marine ray-finned fish

== See also ==
- Indicus (disambiguation)
