= Dohertyorsidis dohertyi =

Scientific classification
- Kingdom: Animalia
- Phylum: Arthropoda
- Class: Insecta
- Order: Coleoptera
- Suborder: Polyphaga
- Infraorder: Cucujiformia
- Family: Cerambycidae
- Genus: Dohertyorsidis
- Species: D. dohertyi

Binomial name
- Dohertyorsidis dohertyi (Breuning, 1960)

Synonyms
- Pseudorsidis dohertyi Breuning, 1960

Species of beetle

Dohertyorsidis dohertyi is a species of beetle in the family Cerambycidae. It was described by Stephan von Breuning in 1960, originally under the genus Pseudorsidis.
