= Olenecamptus griseipennis =

Scientific classification
- Kingdom: Animalia
- Phylum: Arthropoda
- Clade: Pancrustacea
- Class: Insecta
- Order: Coleoptera
- Suborder: Polyphaga
- Infraorder: Cucujiformia
- Family: Cerambycidae
- Genus: Olenecamptus
- Species: O. griseipennis

Binomial name
- Olenecamptus griseipennis (Pic, 1932)

Synonyms
- Cylindrepomus griseipennis Pic, 1932

Species of beetle

Olenecamptus griseipennis is a species of beetle in the family Cerambycidae. It was described by Maurice Pic in 1932, originally under the genus Cylindrepomus.
