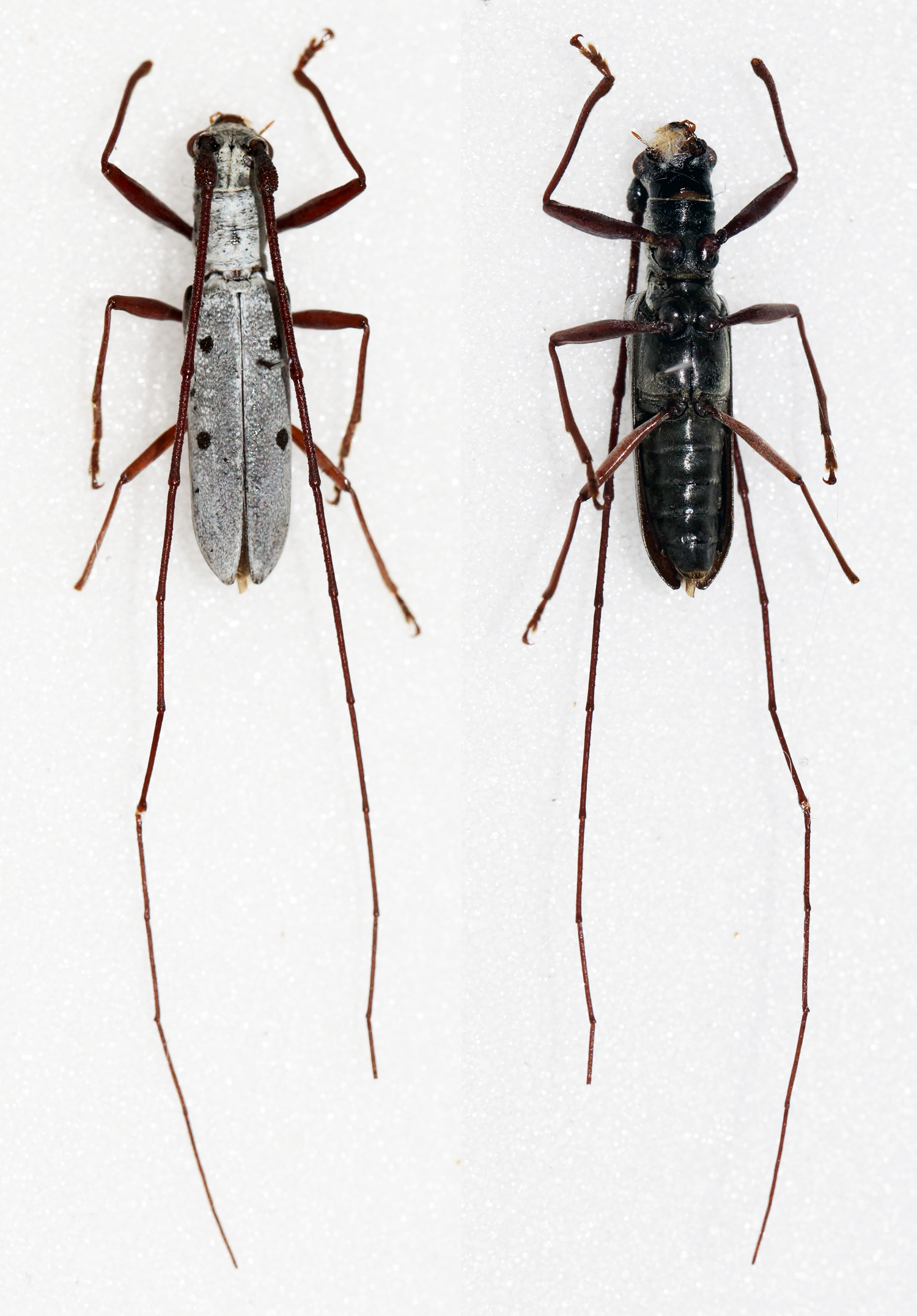

Scientific classification
- Kingdom: Animalia
- Phylum: Arthropoda
- Clade: Pancrustacea
- Class: Insecta
- Order: Coleoptera
- Suborder: Polyphaga
- Infraorder: Cucujiformia
- Family: Cerambycidae
- Genus: Olenecamptus
- Species: O. clarus

Binomial name
- Olenecamptus clarus Pascoe, 1859

= Olenecamptus clarus =

Species of beetle

Olenecamptus clarus is a species of beetle in the family Cerambycidae. It was described by Pascoe in 1859. It is known from Japan, China, Taiwan, North Korea and Russian Far East. It feeds off of Morus alba and Prunus persica.
