= Olenecamptus fukutomii =

Scientific classification
- Kingdom: Animalia
- Phylum: Arthropoda
- Clade: Pancrustacea
- Class: Insecta
- Order: Coleoptera
- Suborder: Polyphaga
- Infraorder: Cucujiformia
- Family: Cerambycidae
- Genus: Olenecamptus
- Species: O. fukutomii

Binomial name
- Olenecamptus fukutomii Hasegawa, 2004

Species of beetle

Olenecamptus fukutomii is a species of beetle in the family Cerambycidae. It was described by Hasegawa in 2004. It is known from the Bonin Islands in Japan.
