= Olenecamptus pseudostrigosus =

Scientific classification
- Kingdom: Animalia
- Phylum: Arthropoda
- Clade: Pancrustacea
- Class: Insecta
- Order: Coleoptera
- Suborder: Polyphaga
- Infraorder: Cucujiformia
- Family: Cerambycidae
- Genus: Olenecamptus
- Species: O. pseudostrigosus

Binomial name
- Olenecamptus pseudostrigosus Breuning, 1938

Species of beetle

Olenecamptus pseudostrigosus is a species of beetle in the family Cerambycidae. It was described by Stephan von Breuning in 1938.

== Subspecies ==
- Olenecamptus pseudostrigosus burmensis Dillon & Dillon, 1948
- Olenecamptus pseudostrigosus didius Dillon & Dillon, 1948
- Olenecamptus pseudostrigosus pseudostrigosus Breuning, 1938
