= Olenecamptus riparius =

Scientific classification
- Kingdom: Animalia
- Phylum: Arthropoda
- Clade: Pancrustacea
- Class: Insecta
- Order: Coleoptera
- Suborder: Polyphaga
- Infraorder: Cucujiformia
- Family: Cerambycidae
- Genus: Olenecamptus
- Species: O. riparius

Binomial name
- Olenecamptus riparius Danilevsky, 2011

Species of beetle

Olenecamptus riparius is a species of beetle in the family Cerambycidae. It was described by Mikhail Leontievich Danilevsky in 2011. It is known from Russia, China and Japan.
