= M. indicus =

M. indicus may refer to:

- Malacosteus indicus, the stoplight loosejaw, a fish species
- Marumba indicus, a species of hawk moth
- Mediorhynchus indicus, a species of spiny-headed worm
- Melanobatrachus indicus, a frog species endemic to southern Western Ghats of India
- Melichthys indicus, the Indian triggerfish, a fish species
- Melilotus indicus, a yellow-flowered herb species native to northern Africa, Europe and Asia
- Methanocaldococcus indicus, a species of coccoid methanogen archaea
- Metopidius indicus, the bronze-winged jacana, a bird species
- Monopterus indicus, the Bombay swamp eel, a fish species
- Morimus indicus, a species of longhorn beetle
- Mucor indicus, a fungus species
- Mycobacterium indicus pranii, a member of the Myobacterium avium complex

== Synonyms ==
- Microvirga indicus, a synonym of Microvirga indica

== See also ==
- Indicus (disambiguation)
