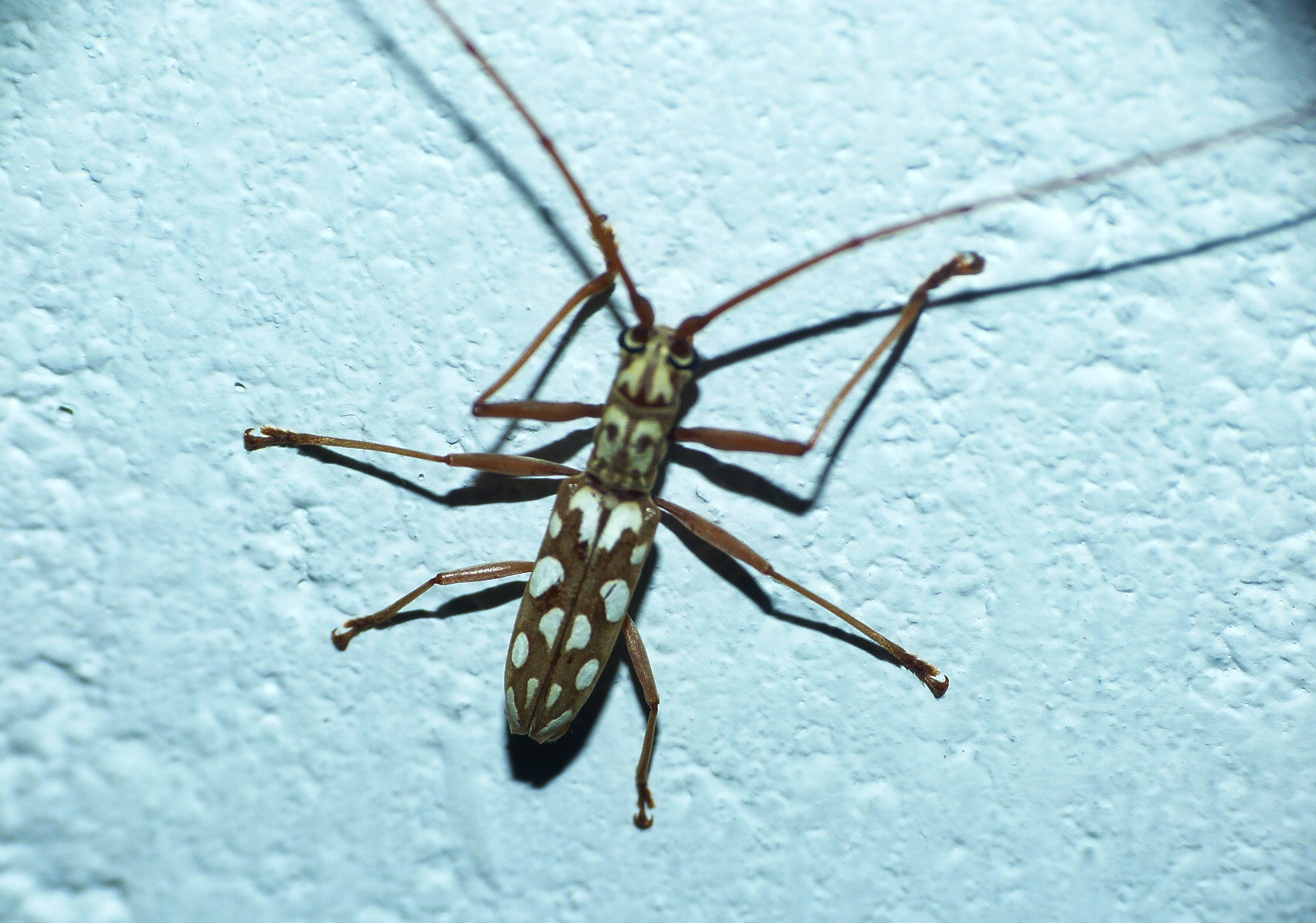

Scientific classification
- Kingdom: Animalia
- Phylum: Arthropoda
- Clade: Pancrustacea
- Class: Insecta
- Order: Coleoptera
- Suborder: Polyphaga
- Infraorder: Cucujiformia
- Family: Cerambycidae
- Genus: Olenecamptus
- Species: O. signaticollis

Binomial name
- Olenecamptus signaticollis Heller, 1926

= Olenecamptus signaticollis =

Species of beetle

Olenecamptus signaticollis is a species of beetle in the family Cerambycidae. It was described by Heller in 1926.
