= Olenecamptus lineaticeps =

Scientific classification
- Kingdom: Animalia
- Phylum: Arthropoda
- Clade: Pancrustacea
- Class: Insecta
- Order: Coleoptera
- Suborder: Polyphaga
- Infraorder: Cucujiformia
- Family: Cerambycidae
- Genus: Olenecamptus
- Species: O. lineaticeps

Binomial name
- Olenecamptus lineaticeps Pic, 1916

Species of beetle

Olenecamptus lineaticeps is a species of beetle in the family Cerambycidae. It was described by Maurice Pic in 1916.
