= Armatophallus crudescens =

Scientific classification
- Domain: Eukaryota
- Kingdom: Animalia
- Phylum: Arthropoda
- Class: Insecta
- Order: Lepidoptera
- Family: Gelechiidae
- Genus: Armatophallus
- Species: A. crudescens

Binomial name
- Armatophallus crudescens (Meyrick, 1920)

Synonyms
- Gelechia crudescens Meyrick, 1920

Species of moth

Armatophallus crudescens is a moth of the family Gelechiidae. It is found in Tanzania, Kenya and Yemen.

The wingspan is 13.2–17.1 mm. Adults have been recorded on wing from late November to early December.
