= Hyagnis meridionalis =

Scientific classification
- Kingdom: Animalia
- Phylum: Arthropoda
- Class: Insecta
- Order: Coleoptera
- Suborder: Polyphaga
- Infraorder: Cucujiformia
- Family: Cerambycidae
- Genus: Hyagnis
- Species: H. meridionalis

Binomial name
- Hyagnis meridionalis Breuning, 1969

Species of beetle

Hyagnis meridionalis is a species of beetle in the family Cerambycidae. It was described by Breuning in 1969.
