= Olenecamptus sarawakensis =

Scientific classification
- Kingdom: Animalia
- Phylum: Arthropoda
- Clade: Pancrustacea
- Class: Insecta
- Order: Coleoptera
- Suborder: Polyphaga
- Infraorder: Cucujiformia
- Family: Cerambycidae
- Genus: Olenecamptus
- Species: O. sarawakensis

Binomial name
- Olenecamptus sarawakensis Breuning, 1936

Species of beetle

Olenecamptus sarawakensis is a species of beetle in the family Cerambycidae. It was described by Stephan von Breuning in 1936. It is known from Borneo.
