= J. indicus =

J. indicus may refer to:

- Janibacter indicus, a species of Gram positive, aerobic bacterium
- Jonas indicus, a species of crab

== See also ==
- Indicus (disambiguation)
