= Olenecamptus timorensis =

Scientific classification
- Kingdom: Animalia
- Phylum: Arthropoda
- Clade: Pancrustacea
- Class: Insecta
- Order: Coleoptera
- Suborder: Polyphaga
- Infraorder: Cucujiformia
- Family: Cerambycidae
- Genus: Olenecamptus
- Species: O. timorensis

Binomial name
- Olenecamptus timorensis Franz, 1972

Species of beetle

Olenecamptus timorensis is a species of beetle in the family Cerambycidae.
