= Olenecamptus anogeissi =

Scientific classification
- Kingdom: Animalia
- Phylum: Arthropoda
- Clade: Pancrustacea
- Class: Insecta
- Order: Coleoptera
- Suborder: Polyphaga
- Infraorder: Cucujiformia
- Family: Cerambycidae
- Genus: Olenecamptus
- Species: O. anogeissi

Binomial name
- Olenecamptus anogeissi Gardner, 1930

Species of beetle

Olenecamptus anogeissi is a species of beetle in the family Cerambycidae. It was described by Gardner in 1930. It is known from India.
