= T. indicus =

T. indicus may refer to:

- Tanymecus indicus, a species of weevil
- Tapirus indicus, the Malayan tapir, a mammal species
- Tarsiger indicus, the white-browed bush-robin, a bird species
- Teretoctopus indicus, a species of octopus
- Titanosaurus indicus, a dinosaur species
- Trachurus indicus, the Arabian scad, a species of jack mackerel

== Synonyms ==
- Thymus indicus, a synonym for Platostoma menthoides, a species of mint plant
- Tortrix eryx indicus, a synonym for Eryx johnii, a non-venomous snake species found in Iran, Pakistan, and India
- Trichophorus inducus, a synonym for Acritillas indica, the golden-browed bulbul
- Trionyx indicus, a synonym for Chitra indica, the Indian narrow-headed softshell turtle
- Trochus indicus, a synonym for Onustus indicus, a species of large carrier shell

== See also ==
- Indicus (disambiguation)
- Tamarindus indica, a tree species
