= Olenecamptus kenyensis =

Scientific classification
- Kingdom: Animalia
- Phylum: Arthropoda
- Clade: Pancrustacea
- Class: Insecta
- Order: Coleoptera
- Suborder: Polyphaga
- Infraorder: Cucujiformia
- Family: Cerambycidae
- Genus: Olenecamptus
- Species: O. kenyensis

Binomial name
- Olenecamptus kenyensis Adlbauer, 2010

Species of beetle

Olenecamptus kenyensis is a species of beetle in the family Cerambycidae. It was described by Adlbauer in 2010. It is known from Kenya.
