= Domibacillus antri =

Scientific classification
- Domain: Bacteria
- Kingdom: Bacillati
- Phylum: Bacillota
- Class: Bacilli
- Order: Bacillales
- Family: Bacillaceae
- Genus: Domibacillus
- Species: D. antri

Binomial name
- Domibacillus antri Xu et al. 2016

Type strain
- CCTCC AB 2015053, XD80, KCTC 33636

Species of bacterium

Domibacillus antri is a Gram-positive, strictly aerobic, capsule-forming, rod-shaped and motile bacterium from the genus Domibacillus which has been isolated from soil from a cave in Lichuan, Hubei in China.
