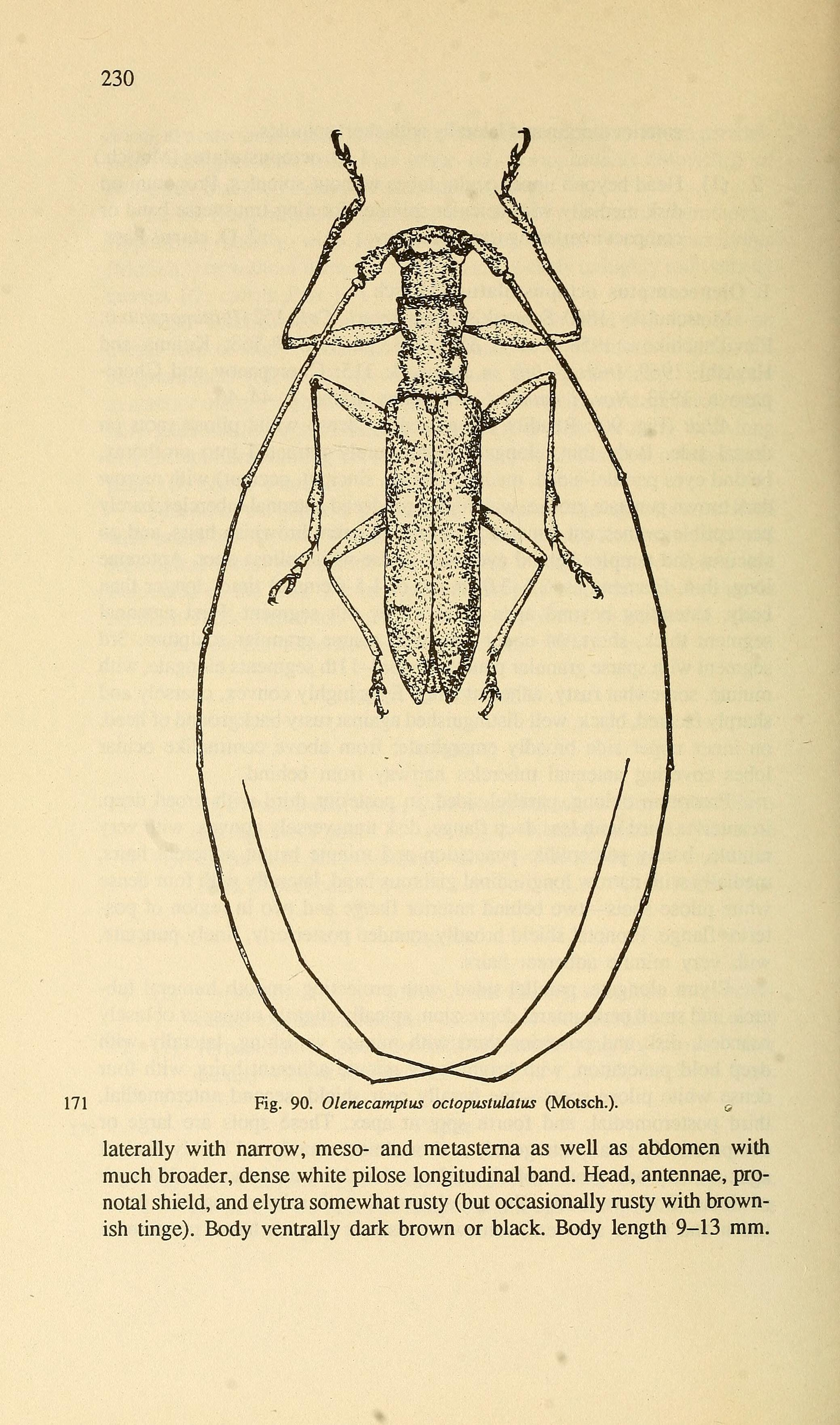
- Cerambycidae of Northern Asia / A.I. Cherepanov.

Scientific classification
- Kingdom: Animalia
- Phylum: Arthropoda
- Clade: Pancrustacea
- Class: Insecta
- Order: Coleoptera
- Suborder: Polyphaga
- Infraorder: Cucujiformia
- Family: Cerambycidae
- Genus: Olenecamptus
- Species: O. octopustulatus

Binomial name
- Olenecamptus octopustulatus (Motschulsky, 1860)

Synonyms
- Ibidiomorphum octopustulatum Motschulsky, 1860; Olenecamptus octopustulatus octopustulatus Motschulsky, 1860

= Olenecamptus octopustulatus =

Species of beetle

Olenecamptus octopustulatus is a species of beetle in the family Cerambycidae. It was described by Victor Motschulsky in 1860, originally under the genus Ibidiomorphum. It is known from Mongolia.
