= G. indicus =

G. indicus may refer to:

- Gyaritus indicus, a species of longhorn beetle
- Gymnothorax indicus, a species of moray eel
- Gyps indicus, the Indian vulture, an Old World vulture native to the Indian subcontinent

== See also ==
- Indicus (disambiguation)
