= Olenecamptus superbus =

Scientific classification
- Kingdom: Animalia
- Phylum: Arthropoda
- Clade: Pancrustacea
- Class: Insecta
- Order: Coleoptera
- Suborder: Polyphaga
- Infraorder: Cucujiformia
- Family: Cerambycidae
- Genus: Olenecamptus
- Species: O. superbus

Binomial name
- Olenecamptus superbus Pic, 1908

Species of beetle

Olenecamptus superbus is a species of beetle in the family Cerambycidae. It was described by Maurice Pic in 1908.
