= Dohertyorsidis =

Scientific classification
- Kingdom: Animalia
- Phylum: Arthropoda
- Class: Insecta
- Order: Coleoptera
- Suborder: Polyphaga
- Infraorder: Cucujiformia
- Family: Cerambycidae
- Tribe: Lamiini
- Genus: Dohertyorsidis

Genus of beetles

Dohertyorsidis is a genus of longhorn beetles of the subfamily Lamiinae, containing the following species:

- Dohertyorsidis dohertyi (Breuning, 1960)
- Dohertyorsidis indicus Breuning, 1982
