= P. indicus =

P. indicus may refer to:

- Pangasius indicus, an extinct species of catfish
- Parapedobacter indicus, a species of bacterium in the family Sphingobacteriaceae
- Phellodon indicus, a species of tooth fungus
- Planonasus indicus, the pygmy false catshark, a species of ground shark
- Plocamopherus indicus, a species of sea slug
- Polyipnus indicus, a species of ray-finned fish
- Pontibacter indicus, a species of bacterium in the family Hymenobacteraceae
- Porphyrio indicus, a species of swamp hen
- Platycephalus indicus, the bartail flathead species
- Pterocarpus indicus, the Pashu Padauk, Malay Paduak or New Guinea rosewood, a plant species
- Pterocles indicus, the painted sandgrouse, a medium large bird species found in South Asia
- Pterocryptis indicus, a species of catfish

== Synonyms ==
- Penaeus indicus, a synonym of Fenneropenaeus indicus, the Indian prawn
- Phyllodiscus indicus, a synonym of Triactis producta, a species of sea anemone
- Potamogeton indicus, a synonym of Aponogeton natans, a species of Cape-pondweed

== See also ==
- Indicus (disambiguation)
