= Olenecamptus indianus =

Scientific classification
- Kingdom: Animalia
- Phylum: Arthropoda
- Clade: Pancrustacea
- Class: Insecta
- Order: Coleoptera
- Suborder: Polyphaga
- Infraorder: Cucujiformia
- Family: Cerambycidae
- Genus: Olenecamptus
- Species: O. indianus

Binomial name
- Olenecamptus indianus (Thomson, 1857)

Synonyms
- Authades indianus Thomson, 1857; Olenecamptus albolineatus Pic, 1916; Olenecamptus multinotatus Pic, 1916

Species of beetle

Olenecamptus indianus is a species of beetle in the family Cerambycidae. It was described by Thomson in 1857, originally under the genus Authades. It is known from Myanmar, Malaysia, Vietnam, Thailand, and India. It contains the varietas Olenecamptus indianus var. salweeni.
