= B. indicus =

B. indicus may refer to:

- Babelomurex indicus, a species of rock snail
- Bathophilus indicus, a species of barbeled dragonfish
- Bayerotrochus indicus, a species of slit snail
- Belonostomus indicus, a prehistoric fish species
- Benthenchelys indicus, a species of snake eel
- Blepephaeus indicus, a species of longhorn beetle
- Bos indicus, the zebu, a type of domestic cattle
- Bucco indicus, a name proposed for a bird resembling Psilopogon haemacephalus in 1790
- Burhinus indicus, the Indian Stone-curlew
- Butastur indicus, the grey-faced buzzard, an Asian bird of prey

== See also ==
- Indicus (disambiguation)
