= Armatophallus akagericus =

Scientific classification
- Domain: Eukaryota
- Kingdom: Animalia
- Phylum: Arthropoda
- Class: Insecta
- Order: Lepidoptera
- Family: Gelechiidae
- Genus: Armatophallus
- Species: A. akagericus

Binomial name
- Armatophallus akagericus Bidzilya, 2015

Species of moth

Armatophallus akagericus is a moth of the family Gelechiidae. It is found in Rwanda.

The wingspan is 13.2–13.4 mm. Adults have been recorded on wing in September.

== Etymology ==
The species name refers to the Akagera National Park, the type locality.
