= Armatophallus =

Scientific classification
- Domain: Eukaryota
- Kingdom: Animalia
- Phylum: Arthropoda
- Class: Insecta
- Order: Lepidoptera
- Family: Gelechiidae
- Subfamily: Gelechiinae
- Genus: Armatophallus; Bidzilya, 2015

Genus of moths

Armatophallus is a genus of moths in the family Gelechiidae.

== Species ==
- Armatophallus akagericus Bidzilya, 2015
- Armatophallus crudescens (Meyrick, 1920)
- Armatophallus exoenota (Meyrick, 1918)
- Armatophallus hackeri Bidzilya, 2015
- Armatophallus indicus Bidzilya, 2015
- Armatophallus kuehnei Bidzilya, 2015
