= Olenecamptus somalius =

Scientific classification
- Kingdom: Animalia
- Phylum: Arthropoda
- Clade: Pancrustacea
- Class: Insecta
- Order: Coleoptera
- Suborder: Polyphaga
- Infraorder: Cucujiformia
- Family: Cerambycidae
- Genus: Olenecamptus
- Species: O. somalius

Binomial name
- Olenecamptus somalius Dillon & Dillon, 1948

Species of beetle

Olenecamptus somalius is a species of beetle in the family Cerambycidae. It was described by Dillon and Dillon in 1948. It is distributed in the area of Ethiopia, Somalia, and Kenya, and are also known as lamiines and flat-faced longhorned beetles.
