= F. indicus =

F. indicus may refer to:

- Fenneropenaeus indicus, the Indian prawn
- Formiscurra indicus, a species of planthopper

== Synonyms ==
- Fusinus indicus, a synonym for Marmorofusus tuberculatus, a species of sea snail

== See also ==
- Indicus (disambiguation)
