= Indicus =

Indicus – Indian in Latin – may refer to:

== Species disambiguation pages ==
- A. indicus (disambiguation)
- B. indicus (disambiguation)
- C. indicus (disambiguation)
- D. indicus (disambiguation)
- E. indicus (disambiguation)
- F. indicus (disambiguation)
- G. indicus (disambiguation)
- H. indicus (disambiguation)
- I. indicus (disambiguation)
- J. indicus (disambiguation)
- L. indicus (disambiguation)
- M. indicus (disambiguation)
- N. indicus (disambiguation)
- O. indicus (disambiguation)
- P. indicus (disambiguation)
- R. indicus (disambiguation)
- S. indicus (disambiguation)
- T. indicus (disambiguation)
- U. indicus (disambiguation)
- V. indicus (disambiguation)

== Other species ==
- Kurtus indicus, a species of nurseryfish

== See also ==
- Indicum (disambiguation)
- Indica (disambiguation)
- Indian (disambiguation)
