= Scaposodus =

Scientific classification
- Kingdom: Animalia
- Phylum: Arthropoda
- Class: Insecta
- Order: Coleoptera
- Suborder: Polyphaga
- Infraorder: Cucujiformia
- Family: Cerambycidae
- Tribe: Pteropliini
- Genus: Scaposodus

Genus of beetles

Scaposodus is a genus of longhorn beetles of the subfamily Lamiinae, containing the following species:

- Scaposodus indicus Breuning, 1969
- Scaposodus rufulus Breuning, 1961
