= Armatophallus hackeri =

Scientific classification
- Domain: Eukaryota
- Kingdom: Animalia
- Phylum: Arthropoda
- Class: Insecta
- Order: Lepidoptera
- Family: Gelechiidae
- Genus: Armatophallus
- Species: A. hackeri

Binomial name
- Armatophallus hackeri Bidzilya, 2015

Species of moth

Armatophallus hackeri is a moth of the family Gelechiidae. It is found in Yemen and Ethiopia.

The wingspan is 13.8–14 mm (0.54–0.55 in). Adults have been recorded on wing in mid-November and early May.

== Etymology ==
The species is named in honour of Hermann Hacker, who collected the type series.
