= Olenecamptus basalis =

Scientific classification
- Kingdom: Animalia
- Phylum: Arthropoda
- Clade: Pancrustacea
- Class: Insecta
- Order: Coleoptera
- Suborder: Polyphaga
- Infraorder: Cucujiformia
- Family: Cerambycidae
- Genus: Olenecamptus
- Species: O. basalis

Binomial name
- Olenecamptus basalis Gahan, 1900

Species of beetle

Olenecamptus basalis is a species of beetle in the family Cerambycidae. It was described by Gahan in 1900.
