= Domibacillus =

Scientific classification
- Domain: Bacteria
- Kingdom: Bacillati
- Phylum: Bacillota
- Class: Bacilli
- Order: Bacillales
- Family: Bacillaceae
- Genus: Domibacillus; Seiler et al. 2013

Type species
- Domibacillus robiginosus Seiler, Wenning & Scherer 2013

Species
- Domibacillus aminovorans; Domibacillus antri; Domibacillus enclensis; Domibacillus epiphyticus; Domibacillus indicus; Domibacillus iocasae; Domibacillus mangrovi; Domibacillus robiginosus; Domibacillus tundrae

Genus of bacteria

Domibacillus is a genus of bacteria from the family Bacillaceae.

== Phylogeny ==
The currently accepted taxonomy is based on the List of Prokaryotic names with Standing in Nomenclature (LPSN) and National Center for Biotechnology Information (NCBI).

16S rRNA based LTP_10_2024

- Domibacillus
  - - Bacillus ectoiniformans Zhu et al. 2016
    - D. indicus Sharma et al. 2014
  - - - D. aminovorans (den Dooren de Jong 1927) Verma et al. 2022
      - D. mangrovi Verma et al. 2017
    - - D. antri Xu et al. 2016
      - - D. epiphyticus Verma et al. 2017
        - - D. iocasae Sun & Sun 2016
          - - D. robiginosus Seiler, Wenning & Scherer 2013
            - - D. enclensis Sonalkar et al. 2014
              - D. tundrae Gyeong et al. 2015

120 marker proteins based GTDB 09-RS220

- Domibacillus
  - - D. antri
    - - D. epiphyticus
      - - D. aminovorans
        - D. mangrovi
  - - D. indicus
    - - D. robiginosus
      - - D. enclensis
        - - D. iocasae
          - D. tundrae
