= Domibacillus robiginosus =

Scientific classification
- Domain: Bacteria
- Kingdom: Bacillati
- Phylum: Bacillota
- Class: Bacilli
- Order: Bacillales
- Family: Bacillaceae
- Genus: Domibacillus
- Species: D. robiginosus

Binomial name
- Domibacillus robiginosus Seiler et al. 2013

Type strain
- DSM 25058, LMG 26645, WS 4628

Synonyms
- Bacillus robiginosus

Species of bacterium

Domibacillus robiginosus is a bacterium from the genus Domibacillus which has been isolated from a pharmaceutical clean room in Germany.
