= Olenecamptus octomaculatus =

Scientific classification
- Kingdom: Animalia
- Phylum: Arthropoda
- Clade: Pancrustacea
- Class: Insecta
- Order: Coleoptera
- Suborder: Polyphaga
- Infraorder: Cucujiformia
- Family: Cerambycidae
- Genus: Olenecamptus
- Species: O. octomaculatus

Binomial name
- Olenecamptus octomaculatus Breuning, 1940

Species of beetle

Olenecamptus octomaculatus is a species of beetle in the family Cerambycidae. It was described by Stephan von Breuning in 1940.
