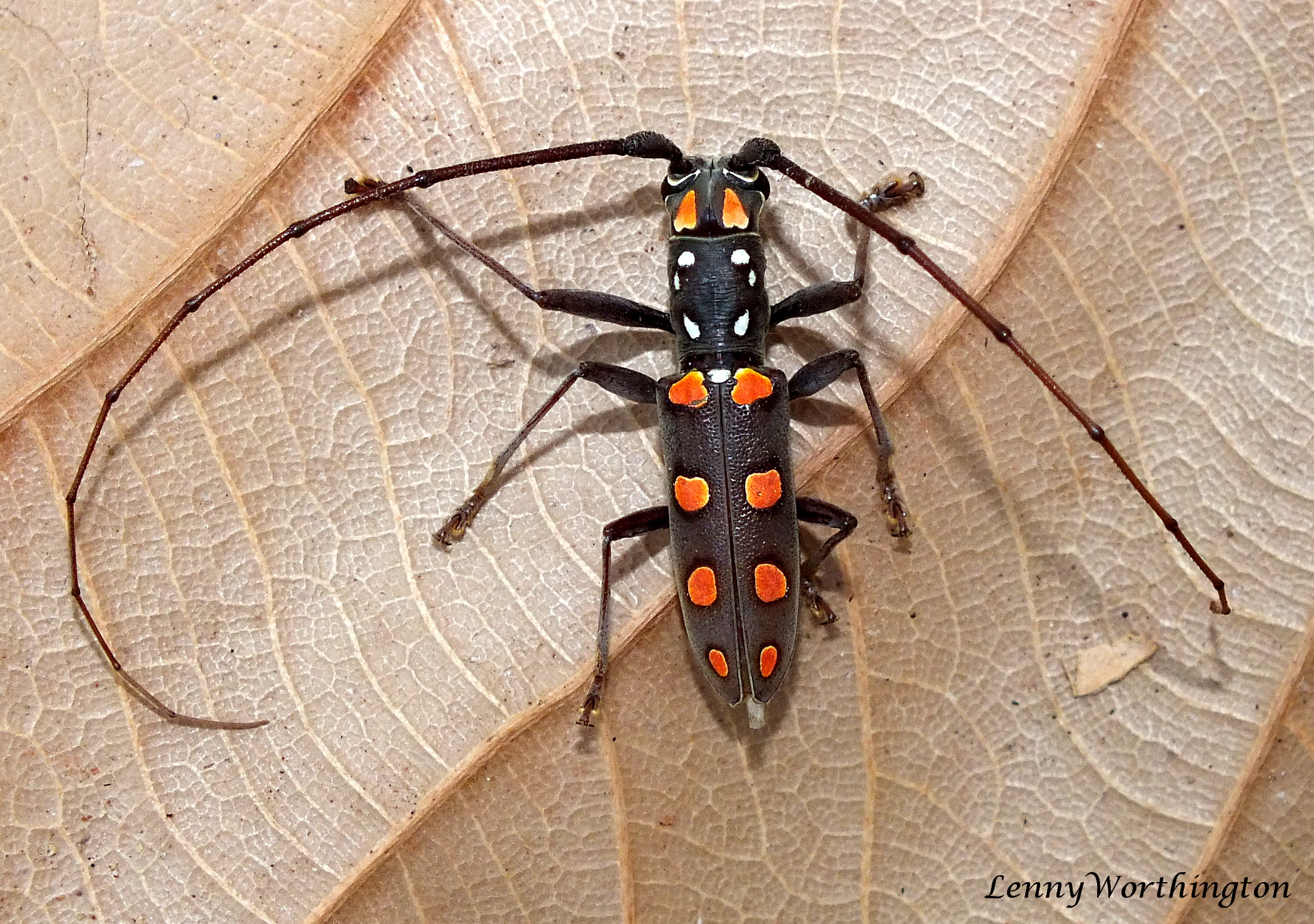

Scientific classification
- Kingdom: Animalia
- Phylum: Arthropoda
- Clade: Pancrustacea
- Class: Insecta
- Order: Coleoptera
- Suborder: Polyphaga
- Infraorder: Cucujiformia
- Family: Cerambycidae
- Genus: Olenecamptus
- Species: O. siamensis

Binomial name
- Olenecamptus siamensis Breuning, 1936

= Olenecamptus siamensis =

Species of beetle

Olenecamptus siamensis is a species of beetle in the family Cerambycidae. It was described by Stephan von Breuning in 1936. It is known from China, Sumatra, Myanmar, Vietnam, Thailand, and Taiwan. It contains the varietas Olenecamptus siamensis var. reductus.
