= Olenecamptus formosanus =

Scientific classification
- Kingdom: Animalia
- Phylum: Arthropoda
- Clade: Pancrustacea
- Class: Insecta
- Order: Coleoptera
- Suborder: Polyphaga
- Infraorder: Cucujiformia
- Family: Cerambycidae
- Genus: Olenecamptus
- Species: O. formosanus

Binomial name
- Olenecamptus formosanus Pic, 1914

Synonyms
- Olenecamptus decemmaculatus Pic, 1916; Olenecamptus fukutomii (Makihara, 2007); Olenecamptus octopustulatus formosanus (Gressitt, 1951)

Species of beetle

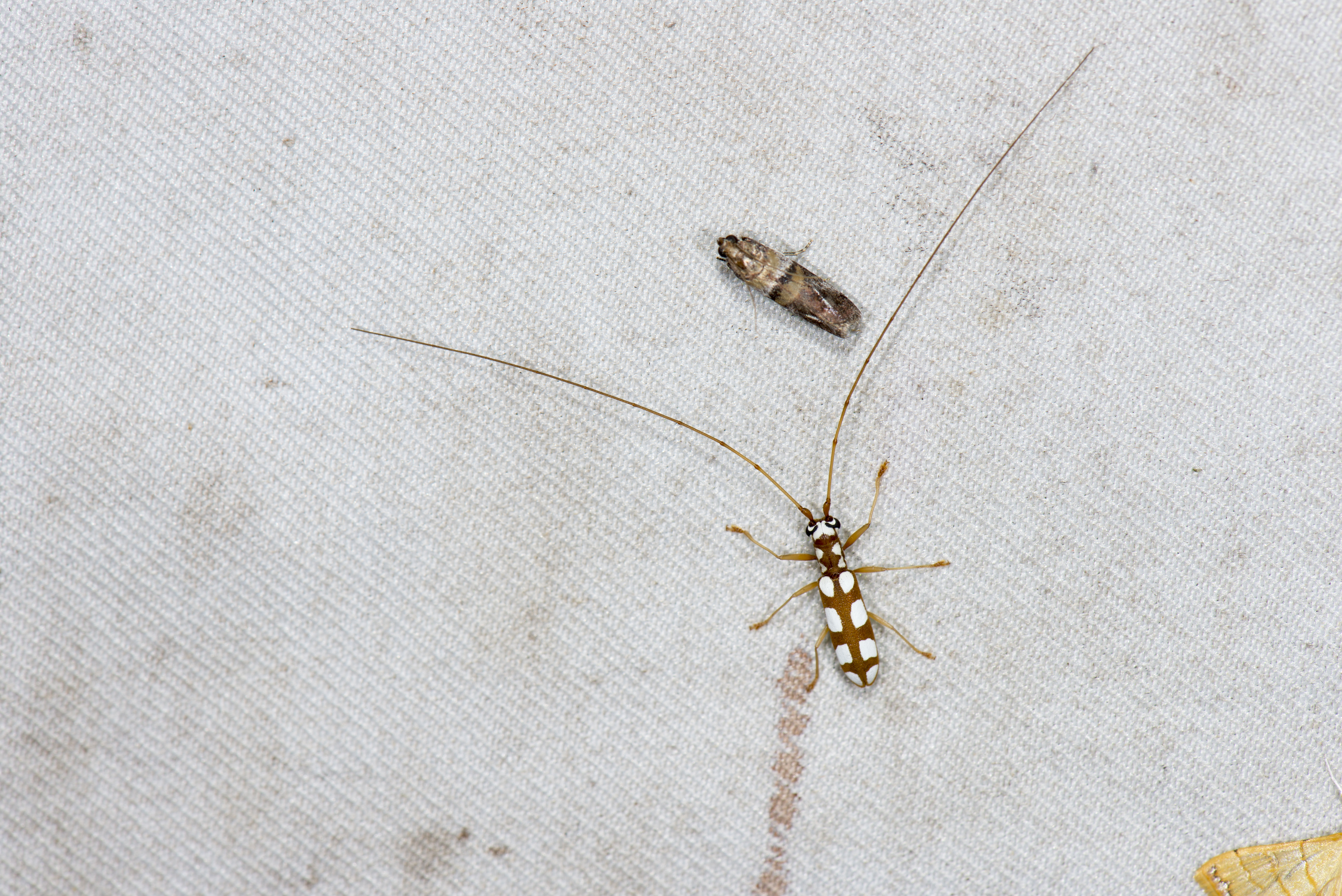
Olenecamptus formosanus

Olenecamptus formosanus is a species of beetle in the family Cerambycidae. It was described by Maurice Pic in 1914. It contains the varietas Olenecamptus formosanus var. decemmaculatus. It occurs in East Asia (Taiwan, Korea, Japan).
