= Olenecamptus quietus =

Scientific classification
- Kingdom: Animalia
- Phylum: Arthropoda
- Clade: Pancrustacea
- Class: Insecta
- Order: Coleoptera
- Suborder: Polyphaga
- Infraorder: Cucujiformia
- Family: Cerambycidae
- Genus: Olenecamptus
- Species: O. quietus

Binomial name
- Olenecamptus quietus Pascoe, 1866

Species of beetle

Olenecamptus quietus is a species of beetle in the family Cerambycidae. It was described by Pascoe in 1866. It is known from Malaysia and Indonesia.
