= Hyagnis apicatus =

Scientific classification
- Kingdom: Animalia
- Phylum: Arthropoda
- Class: Insecta
- Order: Coleoptera
- Suborder: Polyphaga
- Infraorder: Cucujiformia
- Family: Cerambycidae
- Genus: Hyagnis
- Species: H. apicatus

Binomial name
- Hyagnis apicatus Holzschuh, 1984

Species of beetle

Hyagnis apicatus is a species of beetle in the family Cerambycidae. It was described by Holzschuh in 1984.
