= Olenecamptus albidus =

Scientific classification
- Kingdom: Animalia
- Phylum: Arthropoda
- Clade: Pancrustacea
- Class: Insecta
- Order: Coleoptera
- Suborder: Polyphaga
- Infraorder: Cucujiformia
- Family: Cerambycidae
- Genus: Olenecamptus
- Species: O. albidus

Binomial name
- Olenecamptus albidus Jordan, 1894

Species of beetle

Olenecamptus albidus is a species of beetle in the family Cerambycidae. It was described by Karl Jordan in 1894.

== Subspecies ==
- Olenecamptus albidus albidus Jordan, 1894
- Olenecamptus albidus leonensis Dillon & Dillon, 1948
- Olenecamptus albidus natalensis Dillon & Dillon, 1948
