= Hyagnis pakistanus =

Scientific classification
- Kingdom: Animalia
- Phylum: Arthropoda
- Class: Insecta
- Order: Coleoptera
- Suborder: Polyphaga
- Infraorder: Cucujiformia
- Family: Cerambycidae
- Genus: Hyagnis
- Species: H. pakistanus

Binomial name
- Hyagnis pakistanus Breuning, 1975

Species of beetle

Hyagnis pakistanus is a species of beetle in the family Cerambycidae. It was described by Breuning in 1975.

The larvae can drill into wood and cause damage to live wood or logs that have been felled.
