= Olenecamptus cretaceus =

Scientific classification
- Kingdom: Animalia
- Phylum: Arthropoda
- Clade: Pancrustacea
- Class: Insecta
- Order: Coleoptera
- Suborder: Polyphaga
- Infraorder: Cucujiformia
- Family: Cerambycidae
- Genus: Olenecamptus
- Species: O. cretaceus

Binomial name
- Olenecamptus cretaceus Bates, 1873

Species of beetle

Olenecamptus cretaceus is a species of beetle in the family Cerambycidae. It was described by Henry Walter Bates in 1873.

== Subspecies ==
- Olenecamptus cretaceus cretaceus Bates, 1873
- Olenecamptus cretaceus marginatus Schwarzer, 1921
