= Armatophallus kuehnei =

Scientific classification
- Domain: Eukaryota
- Kingdom: Animalia
- Phylum: Arthropoda
- Class: Insecta
- Order: Lepidoptera
- Family: Gelechiidae
- Genus: Armatophallus
- Species: A. kuehnei

Binomial name
- Armatophallus kuehnei Bidzilya, 2015

Species of moth

Armatophallus kuehnei is a moth of the family Gelechiidae. It is found in Rwanda.

The wingspan is 16–17.1 mm. Adults have been recorded on wing in September.

== Etymology ==
The species is named in honour of Lars Kühne, who collected the type series.
