= Olenecamptus circulifer =

Scientific classification
- Kingdom: Animalia
- Phylum: Arthropoda
- Clade: Pancrustacea
- Class: Insecta
- Order: Coleoptera
- Suborder: Polyphaga
- Infraorder: Cucujiformia
- Family: Cerambycidae
- Genus: Olenecamptus
- Species: O. circulifer

Binomial name
- Olenecamptus circulifer Heller, 1923

Synonyms
- Olenecamptus affinis m. circulifer (Heller) Breuning, 1940; Olenecamptus mindanaonis Breuning, 1980

Species of beetle

Olenecamptus circulifer is a species of beetle in the family Cerambycidae. It was described by Heller in 1923. It is known from the Philippines.
