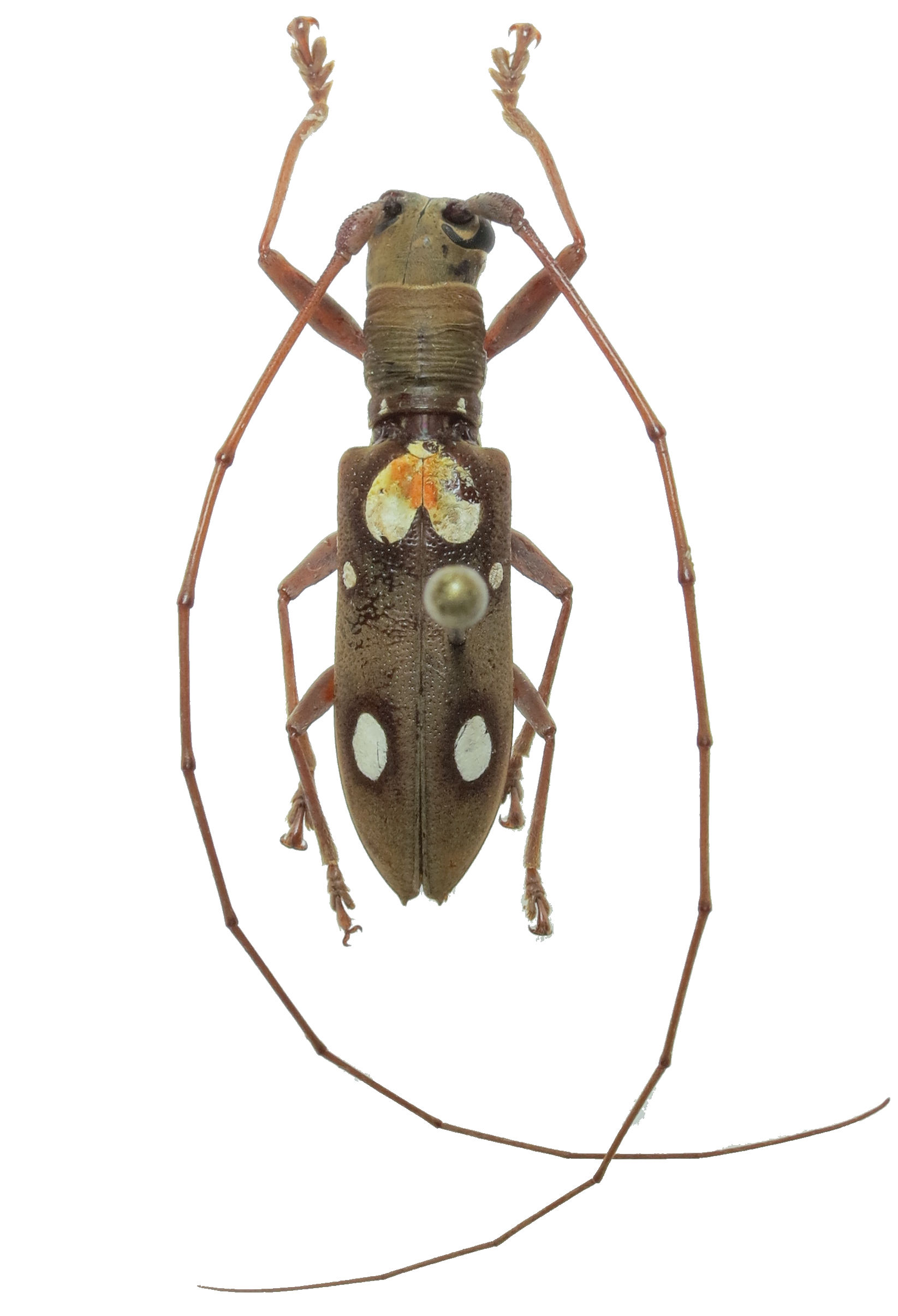
- Olenecamptus bilobus luzonensis from the Philippines

Scientific classification
- Kingdom: Animalia
- Phylum: Arthropoda
- Clade: Pancrustacea
- Class: Insecta
- Order: Coleoptera
- Suborder: Polyphaga
- Infraorder: Cucujiformia
- Family: Cerambycidae
- Genus: Olenecamptus
- Species: O. bilobus

Binomial name
- Olenecamptus bilobus (Fabricius, 1801)

Synonyms
- Olenecamptus lacteoguttatus Fairmaire, 1881; Saperda biloba Fabricius, 1801

= Olenecamptus bilobus =

Species of beetle

Olenecamptus bilobus is a species of beetle in the family Cerambycidae. It was described by Johan Christian Fabricius in 1801, originally under the genus Saperda. It is known from Bhutan, Myanmar, India, Papua New Guinea, Indonesia, Laos, Seychelles, Madagascar, Australia, Sri Lanka, Japan, Sumatra, Java, Philippines and Taiwan.

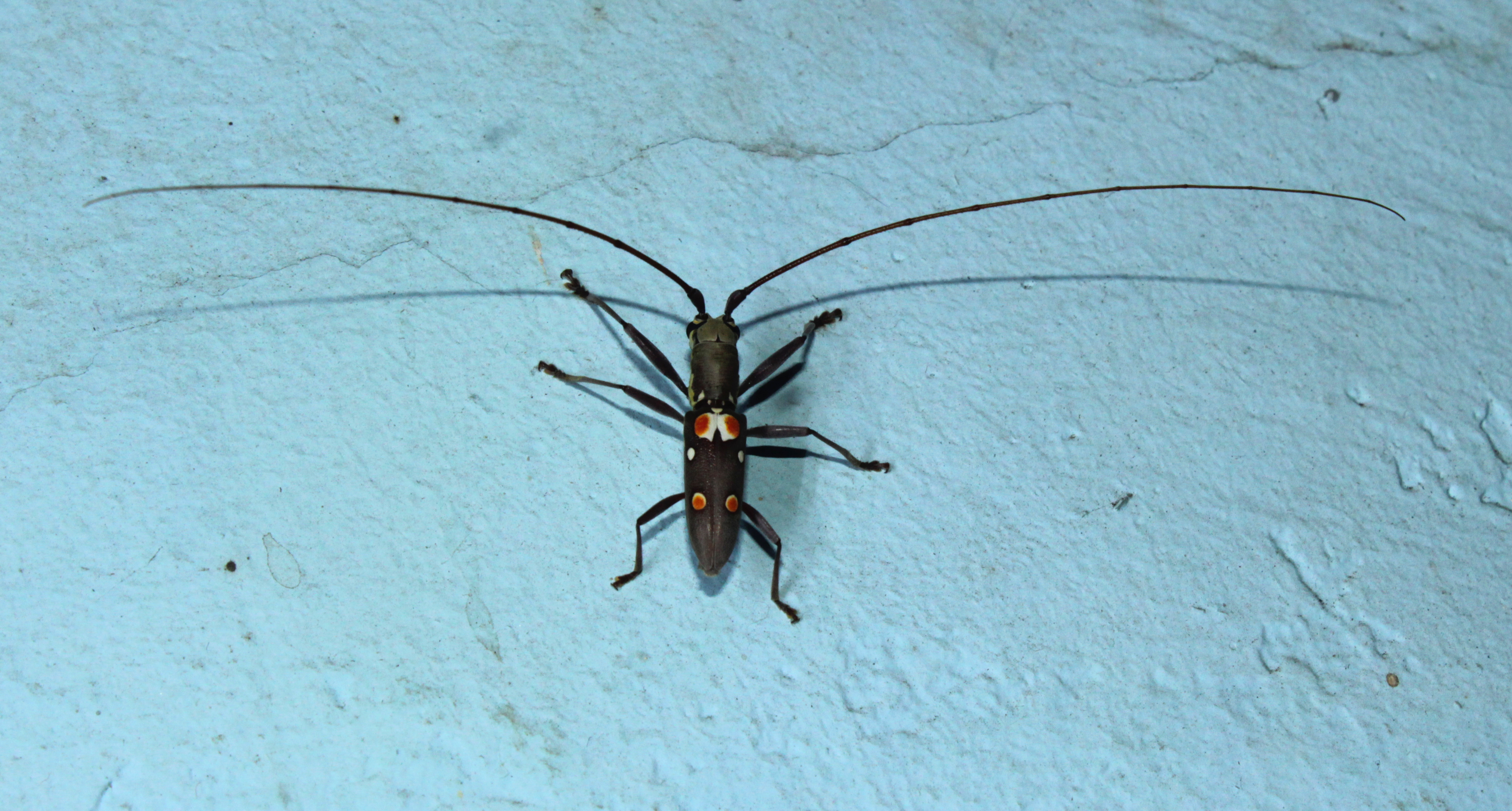
In Kanjirappally, Kerala, India.

== Subspecies ==
- Olenecamptus bilobus bilobus (Fabricius, 1801)
- Olenecamptus bilobus dahli Kriesche, 1926
- Olenecamptus bilobus luzonensis Dillon & Dillon, 1948
- Olenecamptus bilobus madecassus Fairmaire, 1901
- Olenecamptus bilobus nipponensis Dillon & Dillon, 1948
- Olenecamptus bilobus taiwanus Dillon & Dillon, 1948
- Olenecamptus bilobus trimaculatus Breuning, 1940
