= U. indicus =

U. indicus may refer to:

- Upeneus indicus, a species of goatfish
- Urocolius indicus, the red-faced mousebird, a species of mousebird or coly

== See also ==
- Indicus (disambiguation)
