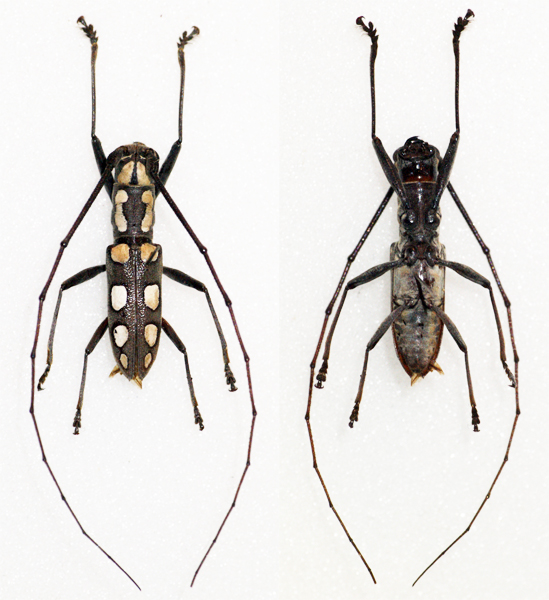
- Olenecamptus optatus

Scientific classification
- Kingdom: Animalia
- Phylum: Arthropoda
- Class: Insecta
- Order: Coleoptera
- Suborder: Polyphaga
- Infraorder: Cucujiformia
- Family: Cerambycidae
- Subfamily: Lamiinae
- Tribe: Dorcaschematini
- Genus: Olenecamptus

Species
- See text

= Olenecamptus =

Genus of beetles

Olenecamptus is a genus of longhorn beetles of the subfamily Lamiinae.

== Species ==
The genus contains the following species:

- Olenecamptus adlbaueri Bjornstad & Minetti
- Olenecamptus affinis Breuning, 1936
- Olenecamptus albidus Jordan, 1894
- Olenecamptus albovittatus Breuning, 1936
- Olenecamptus anogeissi Gardner, 1930
- Olenecamptus australis Dillon & Dillon, 1948
- Olenecamptus basalis Gahan, 1900
- Olenecamptus beardsleyi Gressitt, 1956
- Olenecamptus bilobus (Fabricius, 1801)
- Olenecamptus blairi Breuning, 1936
- Olenecamptus circulifer Heller, 1923
- Olenecamptus clarus Pascoe, 1859
- Olenecamptus compressipes Fairmaire, 1888
- Olenecamptus cretaceus Bates, 1873
- Olenecamptus detzneri Kriesche, 1926
- Olenecamptus diversemaculatus Breuning, 1938
- Olenecamptus dominus Thomson, 1860
- Olenecamptus duodilloni Gilmour, 1947
- Olenecamptus ethiopicus Breuning, 1977
- Olenecamptus formosanus Pic, 1914
- Olenecamptus fukutomii Hasegawa, 2004
- Olenecamptus giraffa (Breuning, 1938)
- Olenecamptus griseipennis (Pic, 1932)
- Olenecamptus grisescens (Pic, 1939)
- Olenecamptus hebridarum Breuning, 1936
- Olenecamptus hofmanni Quedenfeldt, 1882
- Olenecamptus indianus (Thomson, 1857)
- Olenecamptus indicus (Breuning, 1936)
- Olenecamptus kenyensis Adlbauer, 2010
- Olenecamptus laosensis Breuning, 1956
- Olenecamptus lineaticeps Pic, 1916
- Olenecamptus lumawigi Breuning, 1980
- Olenecamptus macari Lameere, 1892
- Olenecamptus malayensis Dillon & Dillon, 1948
- Olenecamptus mordkovitschi Tsherepanov & Dub., 2000
- Olenecamptus nicobaricus Breuning, 1936
- Olenecamptus nigromaculatus Pic, 1915
- Olenecamptus nubilus Jordan, 1904
- Olenecamptus octomaculatus Breuning, 1940
- Olenecamptus octopustulatus (Motschulsky, 1860)
- Olenecamptus olenus Gahan, 1904
- Olenecamptus optatus Pascoe, 1866
- Olenecamptus palawanus Dillon & Dillon, 1948
- Olenecamptus parabilobus Lazarev & Murzin, 2021
- Olenecamptus patrizii Aurivillius, 1928
- Olenecamptus pedongensis Breuning, 1968
- Olenecamptus porcellus Dillon & Dillon, 1948
- Olenecamptus pseudostrigosus Breuning, 1938
- Olenecamptus quadriplagiatus Dillon & Dillon, 1948
- Olenecamptus quietus Pascoe, 1866
- Olenecamptus rhodesianus Dillon & Dillon, 1948
- Olenecamptus riparius Danilevsky, 2011
- Olenecamptus rufus Breuning, 1947
- Olenecamptus sandacanus Heller, 1923
- Olenecamptus sarawakensis Breuning, 1936
- Olenecamptus senegalensis Breuning, 1936
- Olenecamptus serratus Chevrolat, 1835
- Olenecamptus sexplagiatus (Breuning, 1936)
- Olenecamptus shanensis Gilmour, 1952
- Olenecamptus siamensis Breuning, 1936
- Olenecamptus signaticollis Heller, 1926
- Olenecamptus similis Dillon & Dillon, 1948
- Olenecamptus somalius Dillon & Dillon, 1948
- Olenecamptus somereni Gilmour, 1948
- Olenecamptus strigosus Pascoe, 1866
- Olenecamptus subobliteratus Pic, 1923
- Olenecamptus superbus Pic, 1908
- Olenecamptus tagalus Heller, 1923
- Olenecamptus tessellatus Distant, 1898
- Olenecamptus timorensis Franz, 1972
- Olenecamptus triplagiatus Jordan, 1894
- Olenecamptus vittaticollis Heller, 1923
- Olenecamptus zanzibaricus Dillon & Dillon, 1948
