= Hyagnis basicristatus =

Scientific classification
- Kingdom: Animalia
- Phylum: Arthropoda
- Class: Insecta
- Order: Coleoptera
- Suborder: Polyphaga
- Infraorder: Cucujiformia
- Family: Cerambycidae
- Genus: Hyagnis
- Species: H. basicristatus

Binomial name
- Hyagnis basicristatus Breuning, 1949

Species of beetle

Hyagnis basicristatus is a species of beetle in the family Cerambycidae. It was described by Breuning in 1949.
