= Olenecamptus detzneri =

Scientific classification
- Kingdom: Animalia
- Phylum: Arthropoda
- Clade: Pancrustacea
- Class: Insecta
- Order: Coleoptera
- Suborder: Polyphaga
- Infraorder: Cucujiformia
- Family: Cerambycidae
- Genus: Olenecamptus
- Species: O. detzneri

Binomial name
- Olenecamptus detzneri Kriesche, 1926

Species of beetle

Olenecamptus detzneri is a species of beetle in the family Cerambycidae. It was described by Kriesche in 1926. It contains the varietas Olenecamptus detzneri var. curvatomaculatus.
