= N. indicus =

N. indicus may refer to:

- Neodistemon indicus, a species of the nettle family of flowering plants
- Neolithodes indicus, a species of deep-sea king crab
- Neoseiulus indicus, a species of mite
- Nitratireductor indicus, a species of deep-sea bacteria

== Synonyms ==
- Notidanus indicus, a synonym of Notorynchus cepedianus, the broadnose sevengill shark

== See also ==
- Indicus (disambiguation)
