= Hyagnis sumatrensis =

Scientific classification
- Kingdom: Animalia
- Phylum: Arthropoda
- Class: Insecta
- Order: Coleoptera
- Suborder: Polyphaga
- Infraorder: Cucujiformia
- Family: Cerambycidae
- Genus: Hyagnis
- Species: H. sumatrensis

Binomial name
- Hyagnis sumatrensis Breuning, 1982

Species of beetle

Hyagnis sumatrensis is a species of beetle in the family Cerambycidae. It was described by Breuning in 1982.
