= Olenecamptus sandacanus =

Scientific classification
- Kingdom: Animalia
- Phylum: Arthropoda
- Clade: Pancrustacea
- Class: Insecta
- Order: Coleoptera
- Suborder: Polyphaga
- Infraorder: Cucujiformia
- Family: Cerambycidae
- Genus: Olenecamptus
- Species: O. sandacanus

Binomial name
- Olenecamptus sandacanus Heller, 1923

Species of beetle

Olenecamptus sandacanus is a species of beetle in the family Cerambycidae. It was described by Heller in 1923. It is known from Borneo.
