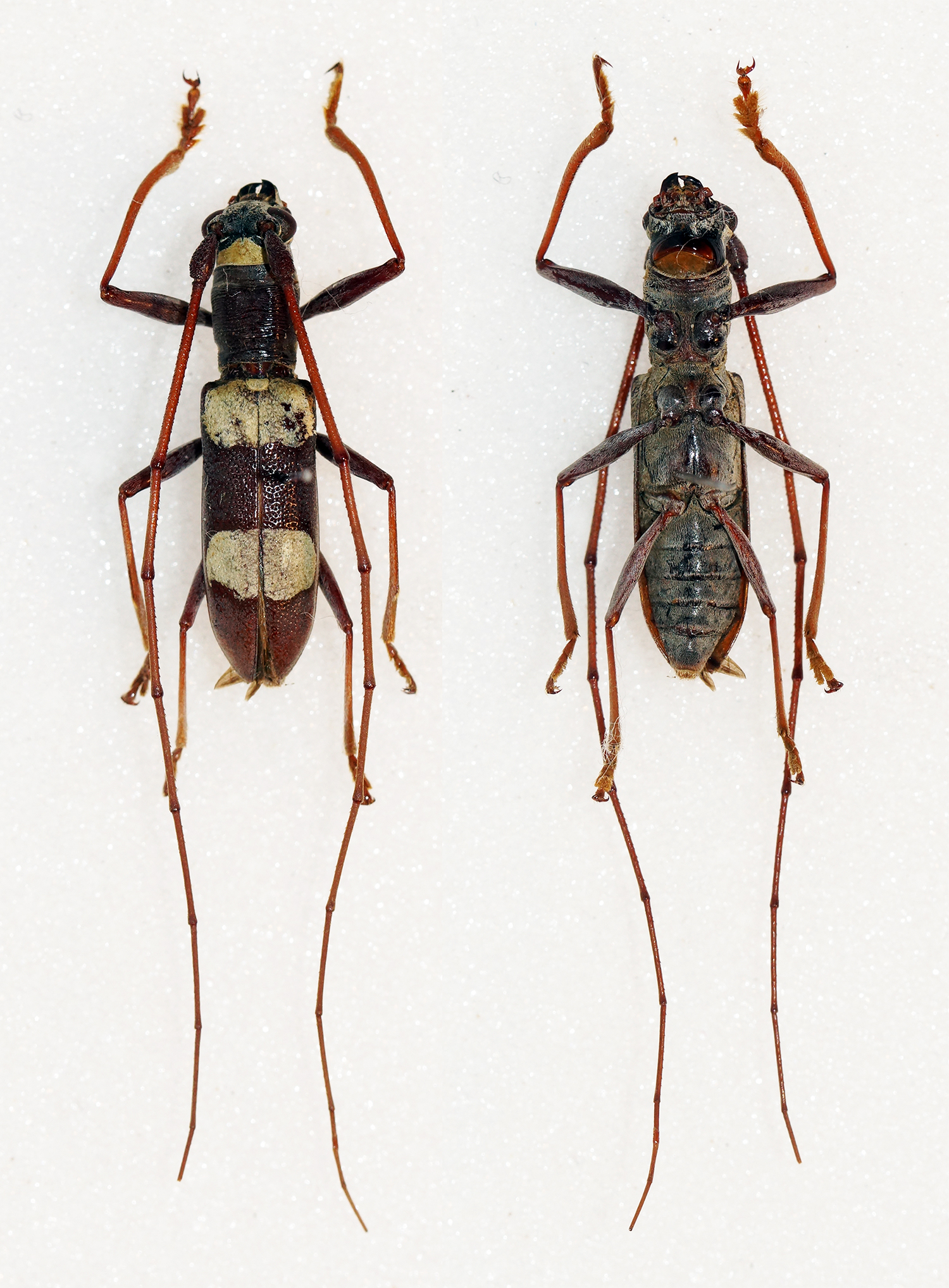

Scientific classification
- Kingdom: Animalia
- Phylum: Arthropoda
- Clade: Pancrustacea
- Class: Insecta
- Order: Coleoptera
- Suborder: Polyphaga
- Infraorder: Cucujiformia
- Family: Cerambycidae
- Genus: Olenecamptus
- Species: O. triplagiatus

Binomial name
- Olenecamptus triplagiatus Jordan, 1894

= Olenecamptus triplagiatus =

Species of beetle

Olenecamptus triplagiatus is a species of beetle in the family Cerambycidae. It was described by Karl Jordan in 1894.
