= Olenecamptus macari =

Scientific classification
- Kingdom: Animalia
- Phylum: Arthropoda
- Clade: Pancrustacea
- Class: Insecta
- Order: Coleoptera
- Suborder: Polyphaga
- Infraorder: Cucujiformia
- Family: Cerambycidae
- Genus: Olenecamptus
- Species: O. macari

Binomial name
- Olenecamptus macari Lameere, 1892

Species of beetle

Olenecamptus macari is a species of beetle in the family Cerambycidae. It was described by Lameere in 1892.
