= Olenecamptus strigosus =

Scientific classification
- Kingdom: Animalia
- Phylum: Arthropoda
- Clade: Pancrustacea
- Class: Insecta
- Order: Coleoptera
- Suborder: Polyphaga
- Infraorder: Cucujiformia
- Family: Cerambycidae
- Genus: Olenecamptus
- Species: O. strigosus

Binomial name
- Olenecamptus strigosus Pascoe, 1866

Synonyms
- Olenecamptus lineatus Gestro, 1876

Species of beetle

Olenecamptus strigosus is a species of beetle in the family Cerambycidae. It was described by Francis Polkinghorne Pascoe in 1866. It is known from Moluccas, Indonesia, and Papua New Guinea.

== Subspecies ==
- Olenecamptus strigosus guadalcanalus Dillon & Dillon, 1948
- Olenecamptus strigosus strigosus Pascoe, 1866
