= Olenecamptus tessellatus =

Scientific classification
- Kingdom: Animalia
- Phylum: Arthropoda
- Clade: Pancrustacea
- Class: Insecta
- Order: Coleoptera
- Suborder: Polyphaga
- Infraorder: Cucujiformia
- Family: Cerambycidae
- Genus: Olenecamptus
- Species: O. tessellatus

Binomial name
- Olenecamptus tessellatus Distant, 1898

Species of beetle

Olenecamptus tessellatus is a species of beetle in the family Cerambycidae. It was described by William Lucas Distant in 1898.

== Variety ==
- Olenecamptus tessellatus var. battangi Villa, 1901
- Olenecamptus tessellatus var. vittatus Breuning, 1940
