= Olenecamptus senegalensis =

Scientific classification
- Kingdom: Animalia
- Phylum: Arthropoda
- Clade: Pancrustacea
- Class: Insecta
- Order: Coleoptera
- Suborder: Polyphaga
- Infraorder: Cucujiformia
- Family: Cerambycidae
- Genus: Olenecamptus
- Species: O. senegalensis

Binomial name
- Olenecamptus senegalensis Breuning, 1936

Synonyms
- Olenecamptus senegalensis m. lerouxi Téocchi, 1998

Species of beetle

Olenecamptus senegalensis is a species of beetle in the family Cerambycidae. It was described by Stephan von Breuning in 1936. It is known from Senegal, the Democratic Republic of the Congo, the Central African Republic, and Uganda.
