= Domibacillus tundrae =

Scientific classification
- Domain: Bacteria
- Kingdom: Bacillati
- Phylum: Bacillota
- Class: Bacilli
- Order: Bacillales
- Family: Bacillaceae
- Genus: Domibacillus
- Species: D. tundrae

Binomial name
- Domibacillus tundrae Gyeong et al. 2015

Type strain
- DSM 29572, PAMC 80007, JCM 30371, KCTC 33549

Species of bacterium

Domibacillus tundrae is a Gram-positive, spore-forming, aerobic, rod-shaped and motile bacterium from the genus Domibacillus which has been isolated from soil of a tussock tundra from Alaska in the United States.
