= Domibacillus enclensis =

Scientific classification
- Domain: Bacteria
- Kingdom: Bacillati
- Phylum: Bacillota
- Class: Bacilli
- Order: Bacillales
- Family: Bacillaceae
- Genus: Domibacillus
- Species: D. enclensis

Binomial name
- Domibacillus enclensis Sonalkar et al. 2014

Type strain
- CCTCC AB 2011121, DSM 25145, NIOC16

Species of bacterium

Domibacillus enclensis is a Gram-positive, strictly aerobic and motile bacterium from the genus Domibacillus which has been isolated from marine sediments from the Chorão Island in India.
