= Olenecamptus compressipes =

Scientific classification
- Kingdom: Animalia
- Phylum: Arthropoda
- Clade: Pancrustacea
- Class: Insecta
- Order: Coleoptera
- Suborder: Polyphaga
- Infraorder: Cucujiformia
- Family: Cerambycidae
- Genus: Olenecamptus
- Species: O. compressipes

Binomial name
- Olenecamptus compressipes Fairmaire, 1888

Species of beetle

Olenecamptus compressipes is a species of beetle in the family Cerambycidae. It was described by Fairmaire in 1888.
