= E. indicus =

E. indicus may refer to:

- Eiconaxius indicus, a species of mud lobster
- Elephas maximus indicus, the Indian elephant, a subspecies of the Asian elephant
- Enarthromyces indicus, a species of fungus
- Euonymus indicus, the Indian spindle tree, a species of spindle tree

== See also ==
- Indicus (disambiguation)
