= Hyagnis bimaculatus =

Scientific classification
- Kingdom: Animalia
- Phylum: Arthropoda
- Class: Insecta
- Order: Coleoptera
- Suborder: Polyphaga
- Infraorder: Cucujiformia
- Family: Cerambycidae
- Genus: Hyagnis
- Species: H. bimaculatus

Binomial name
- Hyagnis bimaculatus Hüdepohl, 1995

Species of beetle

Hyagnis bimaculatus is a species of beetle in the family Cerambycidae. It was described by Hüdepohl in 1995.
