= Olenecamptus nubilus =

Scientific classification
- Kingdom: Animalia
- Phylum: Arthropoda
- Clade: Pancrustacea
- Class: Insecta
- Order: Coleoptera
- Suborder: Polyphaga
- Infraorder: Cucujiformia
- Family: Cerambycidae
- Genus: Olenecamptus
- Species: O. nubilus

Binomial name
- Olenecamptus nubilus Jordan, 1904

Species of beetle

Olenecamptus nubilus is a species of beetle in the family Cerambycidae. It was described by Karl Jordan in 1904.
