= Olenecamptus zanzibaricus =

Scientific classification
- Kingdom: Animalia
- Phylum: Arthropoda
- Clade: Pancrustacea
- Class: Insecta
- Order: Coleoptera
- Suborder: Polyphaga
- Infraorder: Cucujiformia
- Family: Cerambycidae
- Genus: Olenecamptus
- Species: O. zanzibaricus

Binomial name
- Olenecamptus zanzibaricus Dillon & Dillon, 1948

Species of beetle

Olenecamptus zanzibaricus is a species of beetle in the family Cerambycidae. It was described by Dillon and Dillon in 1948. This beetle is native to Zanzibar, Tanzania, where it inhabits various ecosystems, including moist forests and other natural habitats. As a member of the genus Olenecamptus, it shares characteristics common to longhorn beetles, such as elongated antennae and a robust body structure. Detailed information about its specific ecological role, behavior, and conservation status remains limited. Further research is needed to fully understand the species' ecological significance and any potential threats it may face.
