= Olenecamptus mordkovitschi =

Scientific classification
- Kingdom: Animalia
- Phylum: Arthropoda
- Clade: Pancrustacea
- Class: Insecta
- Order: Coleoptera
- Suborder: Polyphaga
- Infraorder: Cucujiformia
- Family: Cerambycidae
- Genus: Olenecamptus
- Species: O. mordkovitschi

Binomial name
- Olenecamptus mordkovitschi Tsherepanov & Dub., 2000

Species of beetle

Olenecamptus mordkovitschi is a species of beetle in the family Cerambycidae. It was described by Tsherepanov and Dub. in 2000.
