= Olenecamptus hofmanni =

Scientific classification
- Kingdom: Animalia
- Phylum: Arthropoda
- Clade: Pancrustacea
- Class: Insecta
- Order: Coleoptera
- Suborder: Polyphaga
- Infraorder: Cucujiformia
- Family: Cerambycidae
- Genus: Olenecamptus
- Species: O. hofmanni

Binomial name
- Olenecamptus hofmanni Quedenfeldt, 1882

Synonyms
- Olenecamptus hofmanni hofmanni (Quedenfeldt) Dillon & Dillon, 1948; Olenecamptus hofmanni m. elegans Téocchi, Sudre, Adlbauer & Jiroux, 2011

Species of beetle

Olenecamptus hofmanni is a species of beetle in the family Cerambycidae. It was described by Quedenfeldt in 1882. It is known from Ghana, Cameroon, the Democratic Republic of the Congo, the Republic of the Congo, Tanzania, the Central African Republic, Gabon, Angola, Malawi, the Ivory Coast, South Africa, and Zimbabwe. It contains the varietas Olenecamptus hofmanni var. dimbokro.
