= Armatophallus exoenota =

Scientific classification
- Domain: Eukaryota
- Kingdom: Animalia
- Phylum: Arthropoda
- Class: Insecta
- Order: Lepidoptera
- Family: Gelechiidae
- Genus: Armatophallus
- Species: A. exoenota

Binomial name
- Armatophallus exoenota (Meyrick, 1918)

Synonyms
- Gelechia exoenota Meyrick, 1918; Gelechia xylophaea Meyrick, 1921

Species of moth

Armatophallus exoenota is a moth of the family Gelechiidae. It was described by Edward Meyrick in 1918. It is found in the Gambia, Cameroon, Ethiopia, Kenya, Tanzania, Uganda, Zimbabwe, Namibia and South Africa.

The wingspan is 12.5-20.1 mm. The forewings are dark red brown, suffusedly mixed with dark purplish fuscous and with a short indistinct light reddish-ochreous transverse mark from the costa almost at the base. The plical and second discal stigmata are small, indistinct and blackish and there is a small indistinct spot of ochreous suffusion on the costa at three-fourths. The hindwings are rather dark grey. Adults are on wing from October to May and in August.
