= Domibacillus iocasae =

Scientific classification
- Domain: Bacteria
- Kingdom: Bacillati
- Phylum: Bacillota
- Class: Bacilli
- Order: Caryophanales
- Family: Bacillaceae
- Genus: Domibacillus
- Species: D. iocasae

Binomial name
- Domibacillus iocasae Sun et al. 2016

Type strain
- CCTCC AB 2015183, DSM 29979, S6

Species of bacterium

Domibacillus iocasae is a Gram-positive bacterium from the genus Domibacillus which has been isolated from deep sea sediments from the Okinawa Trough.
