= V. indicus =

V. indicus may refer to:

- Vanellus indicus, the red-wattled lapwing, a lapwing or large plover, a bird species
- Varanus indicus, the mangrove monitor, mangrove Gganna or Western Pacific monitor lizard, a lizard species
- Vasuki indicus, an extinct species of madtsoiid snake
- Virgibacillus indicus, a species of bacterium isolated from sediments from the Indian Ocean

== See also ==
- Indicus (disambiguation)
