= Olenecamptus subobliteratus =

Scientific classification
- Kingdom: Animalia
- Phylum: Arthropoda
- Clade: Pancrustacea
- Class: Insecta
- Order: Coleoptera
- Suborder: Polyphaga
- Infraorder: Cucujiformia
- Family: Cerambycidae
- Genus: Olenecamptus
- Species: O. subobliteratus

Binomial name
- Olenecamptus subobliteratus Pic, 1923

Synonyms
- Olenecamptus clarus subobliteratus (Pic) Gressitt, 1951; Olenecamptus clarus var. subobliteratus Pic, 1923; Olenecamptus clarus m. subobliterata (Pic) Breuning, 1940 (misspelling)

Species of beetle

Olenecamptus subobliteratus is a species of beetle in the family Cerambycidae. It was described by Maurice Pic in 1923. It is known from China and Japan.
