= Scaposodus rufulus =

Scientific classification
- Kingdom: Animalia
- Phylum: Arthropoda
- Class: Insecta
- Order: Coleoptera
- Suborder: Polyphaga
- Infraorder: Cucujiformia
- Family: Cerambycidae
- Genus: Scaposodus
- Species: S. rufulus

Binomial name
- Scaposodus rufulus Breuning, 1961

Species of beetle

Scaposodus rufulus is a species of beetle in the family Cerambycidae. It was described by Stephan von Breuning in 1961.
