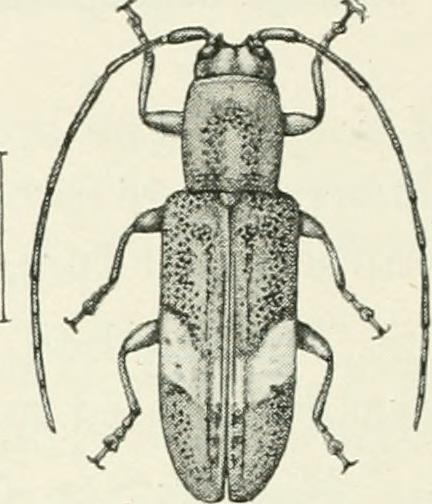
- Hyagnis fistularius

Scientific classification
- Kingdom: Animalia
- Phylum: Arthropoda
- Class: Insecta
- Order: Coleoptera
- Suborder: Polyphaga
- Infraorder: Cucujiformia
- Family: Cerambycidae
- Subfamily: Lamiinae
- Tribe: Apomecynini
- Genus: Hyagnis; Pascoe, 1864

= Hyagnis (beetle) =

Genus of beetles

Hyagnis is a genus of beetles in the family Cerambycidae, containing the following species:

- Hyagnis aethiopicus Breuning, 1974
- Hyagnis apicatus Holzschuh, 1984
- Hyagnis basicristatus Breuning, 1949
- Hyagnis bimaculatus Hüdepohl, 1995
- Hyagnis bootangensis Breuning, 1969
- Hyagnis brevipes Breuning, 1939
- Hyagnis chinensis Breuning, 1961
- Hyagnis fistularius Pascoe, 1864
- Hyagnis gabonicus Breuning, 1939
- Hyagnis indicus Breuning, 1969
- Hyagnis insularis Báguena & Breuning, 1958
- Hyagnis kashmirensis Breuning, 1939
- Hyagnis meridionalis Breuning, 1969
- Hyagnis pakistanus Breuning, 1975
- Hyagnis persimilis Breuning, 1939
- Hyagnis spinipes Breuning, 1962
- Hyagnis stramentosus Breuning, 1942
- Hyagnis strandiellus Breuning, 1942
- Hyagnis sumatrensis Breuning, 1982
- Hyagnis sybroides Breuning, 1939
- Hyagnis vagemaculatus Breuning, 1938
