= Olenecamptus palawanus =

Scientific classification
- Kingdom: Animalia
- Phylum: Arthropoda
- Clade: Pancrustacea
- Class: Insecta
- Order: Coleoptera
- Suborder: Polyphaga
- Infraorder: Cucujiformia
- Family: Cerambycidae
- Genus: Olenecamptus
- Species: O. palawanus

Binomial name
- Olenecamptus palawanus Dillon & Dillon, 1948

Species of beetle

Olenecamptus palawanus is a species of beetle in the family Cerambycidae. It was described by Dillon and Dillon in 1948.
