= Olenecamptus patrizii =

Scientific classification
- Kingdom: Animalia
- Phylum: Arthropoda
- Clade: Pancrustacea
- Class: Insecta
- Order: Coleoptera
- Suborder: Polyphaga
- Infraorder: Cucujiformia
- Family: Cerambycidae
- Genus: Olenecamptus
- Species: O. patrizii

Binomial name
- Olenecamptus patrizii Aurivillius, 1928

Species of beetle

Olenecamptus patrizii is a species of beetle in the family Cerambycidae. It was described by Per Olof Christopher Aurivillius in 1928.
