= R. indicus =

R. indicus may refer to:

- Rakthamichthys indicus, the Malabar swamp eel
- Rallus indicus, the brown-cheeked rail
- Rewaconodon indicus, an extinct species of dromatheriid cynodonts
- Roseovarius indicus, a species of deep-sea bacteria

== Synonyms ==
- Rhinoceros indicus, a synonym of Rhinoceros unicornis, the Indian rhinoceros

== See also ==
- Indicus (disambiguation)
