= I. indicus =

I. indicus may refer to:

- Indjapyx indicus, a species of forcepstail
- Indolestes indicus, a species of spreadwing

== See also ==
- Indicus (disambiguation)
