= Aspergillus jaipurensis =

Scientific classification
- Kingdom: Fungi
- Division: Ascomycota
- Class: Eurotiomycetes
- Order: Eurotiales
- Family: Aspergillaceae
- Genus: Aspergillus
- Species: A. jaipurensis

Binomial name
- Aspergillus jaipurensis B.S. Mehrotra & Agnihotri (1963)

Synonyms
- Aspergillus indicus

Species of fungus

Aspergillus jaipurensis (also named A. indicus) is a species of fungus in the genus Aspergillus. It is from the Nidulantes section. The species was first described in 1963.

In 216, the genome of A. jaipurensis was, under the A. indicus name, sequenced as a part of the Aspergillus whole-genome sequencing project - a project dedicated to performing whole-genome sequencing of all members of the genus Aspergillus. The genome assembly size was 32.49 Mbp.

== Growth and morphology ==
A. jaipurensis has been cultivated on both Czapek yeast extract agar (CYA) plates and Malt Extract Agar Oxoid (MEAOX) plates. The growth morphology of the colonies can be seen in the pictures below.

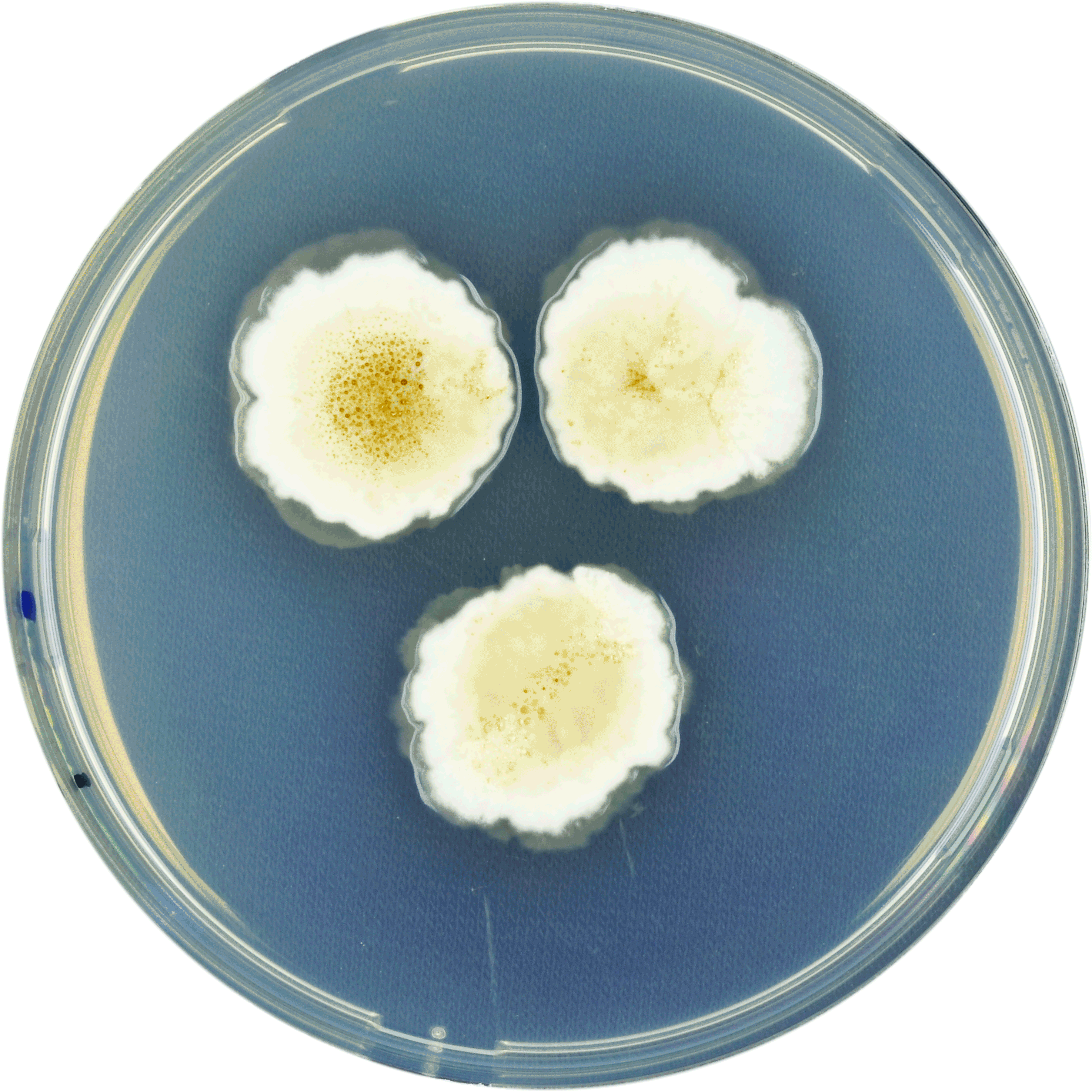
Aspergillus jaipurensis growing on CYA plate

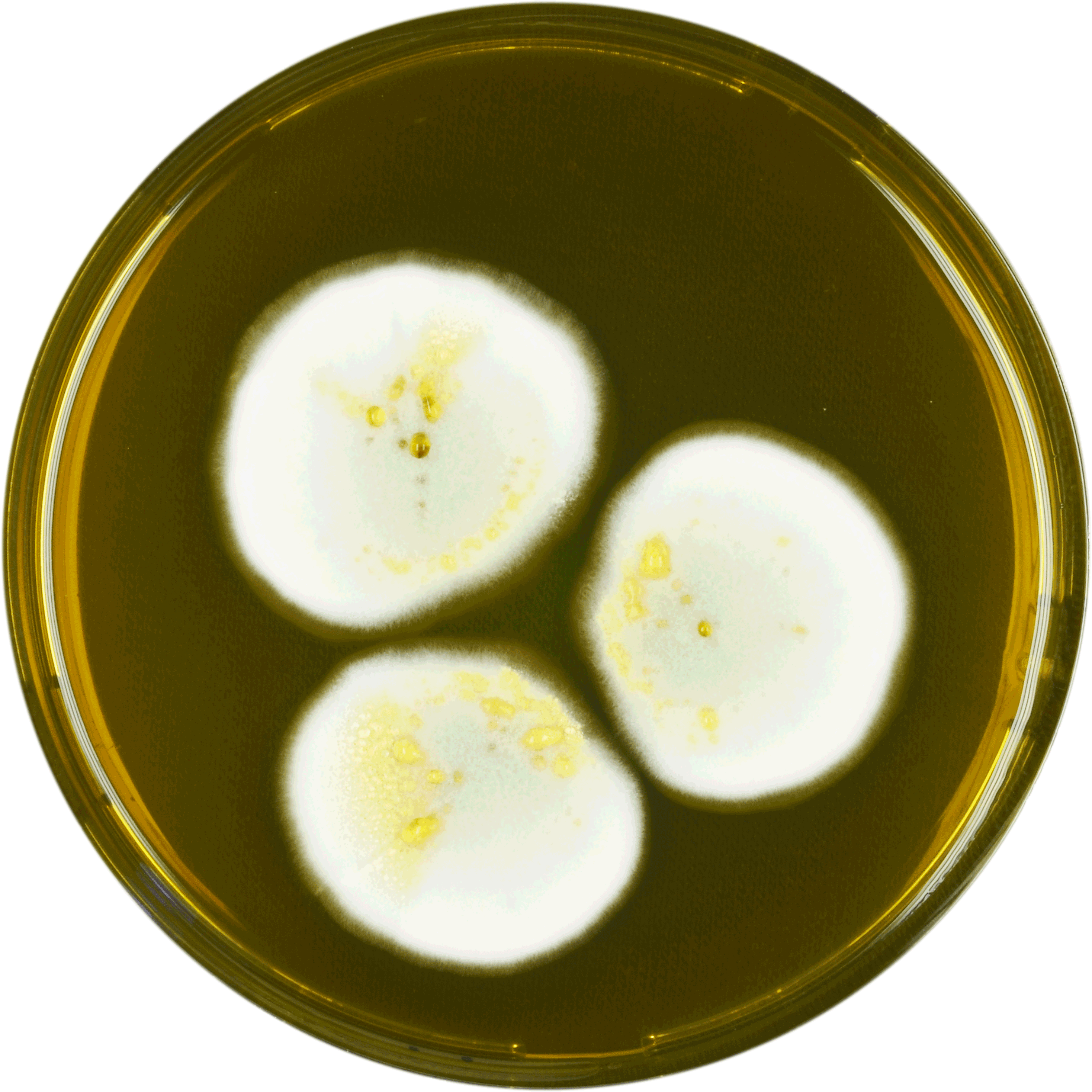
Aspergillus jaipurensis growing on MEAOX plate
