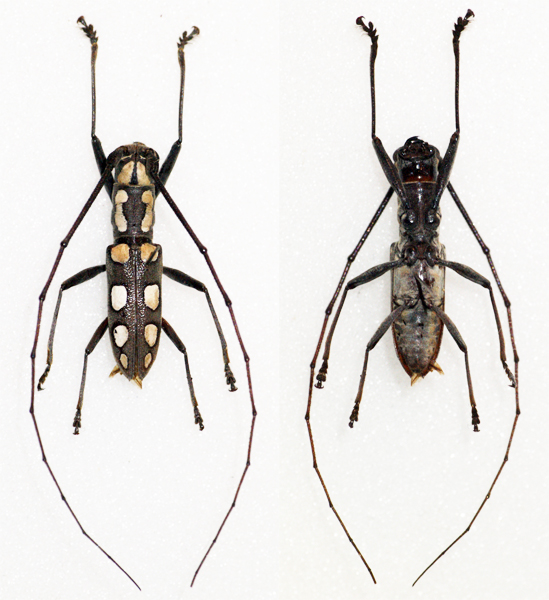

Scientific classification
- Kingdom: Animalia
- Phylum: Arthropoda
- Clade: Pancrustacea
- Class: Insecta
- Order: Coleoptera
- Suborder: Polyphaga
- Infraorder: Cucujiformia
- Family: Cerambycidae
- Genus: Olenecamptus
- Species: O. optatus

Binomial name
- Olenecamptus optatus Pascoe, 1866

= Olenecamptus optatus =

Species of beetle

Olenecamptus optatus is a species of beetle in the family Cerambycidae. It was described by Francis Polkinghorne Pascoe in 1866. It is known from Thailand, Singapore, Malaysia, Sumatra, Vietnam.

== Subspecies ==
- Olenecamptus optatus optatoides Dillon & Dillon, 1948
- Olenecamptus optatus optatus Pascoe, 1866
