= Pseudorsidis =

Scientific classification
- Kingdom: Animalia
- Phylum: Arthropoda
- Class: Insecta
- Order: Coleoptera
- Suborder: Polyphaga
- Infraorder: Cucujiformia
- Family: Cerambycidae
- Genus: Pseudorsidis
- Species: P. griseomaculatus

Binomial name
- Pseudorsidis griseomaculatus (Pic, 1916)

Genus of beetles

Pseudorsidis griseomaculatus is a species of beetle in the family Cerambycidae, and the only species in the genus Pseudorsidis. It was described by Maurice Pic in 1916.
