= Olenecamptus indicus =

Scientific classification
- Kingdom: Animalia
- Phylum: Arthropoda
- Clade: Pancrustacea
- Class: Insecta
- Order: Coleoptera
- Suborder: Polyphaga
- Infraorder: Cucujiformia
- Family: Cerambycidae
- Genus: Olenecamptus
- Species: O. indicus

Binomial name
- Olenecamptus indicus (Breuning, 1936)

Synonyms
- Cylindrepomus indicus Breuning, 1936

Species of beetle

Olenecamptus indicus is a species of beetle in the family Cerambycidae. The species was first described by Stephan von Breuning in 1936, originally under the genus Cylindrepomus. They have since been reclassified as part of the Olenecamptus genus.
