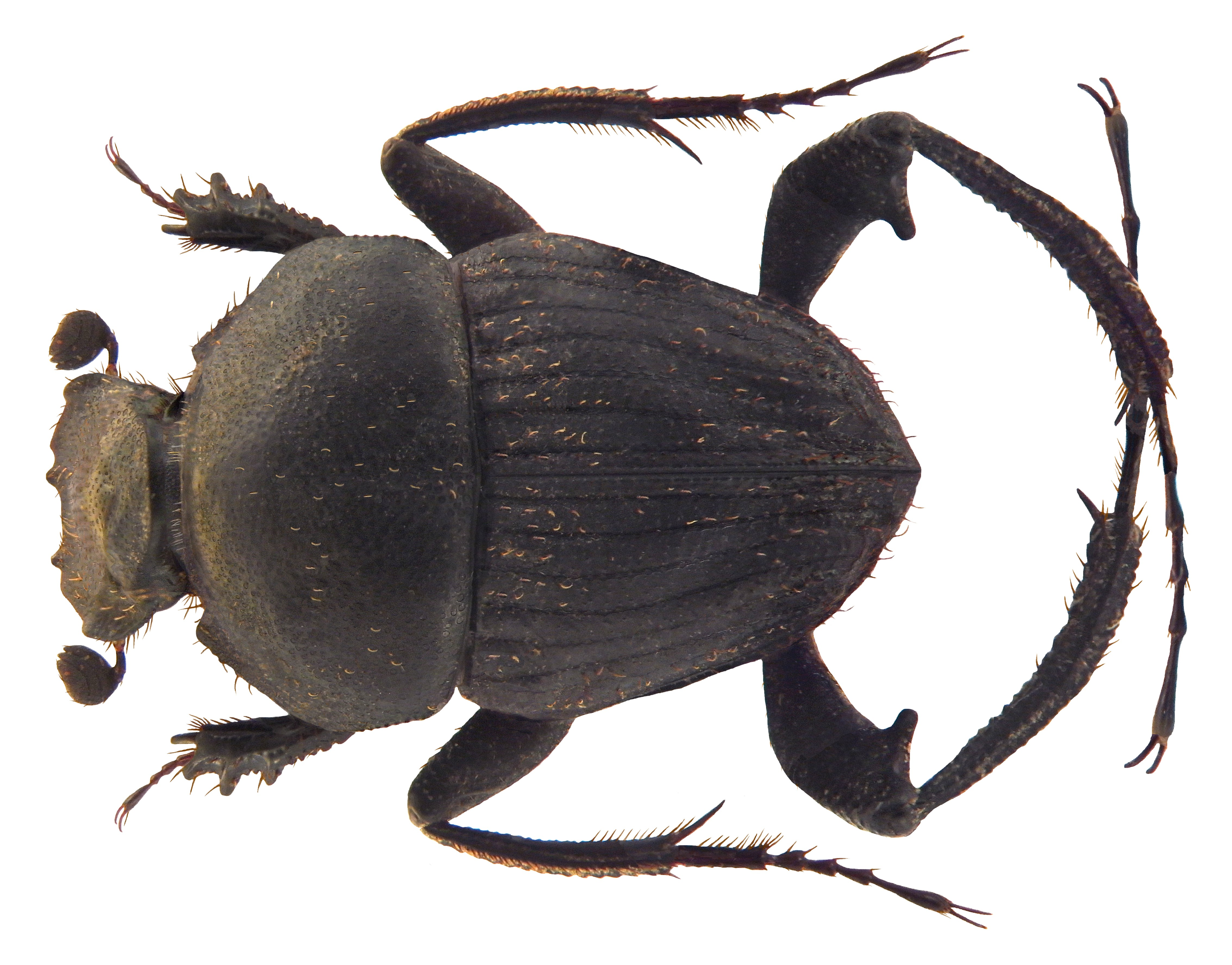
- male

Scientific classification
- Kingdom: Animalia
- Phylum: Arthropoda
- Class: Insecta
- Order: Coleoptera
- Suborder: Polyphaga
- Infraorder: Scarabaeiformia
- Family: Scarabaeidae
- Genus: Sisyphus
- Species: S. indicus

Binomial name
- Sisyphus indicus Hope, 1831

Synonyms
- Sisyphus caschmirensis Redtenbacher, 1848

= Sisyphus indicus =

Species of beetle

Sisyphus indicus, is a species of dung beetle found in India, Nepal and Sri Lanka.
