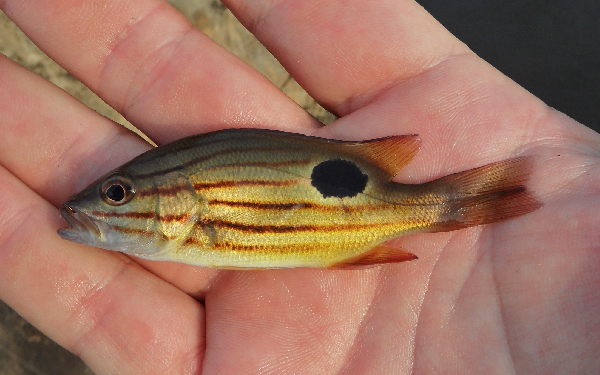

Conservation status
- Least Concern (IUCN 3.1)

Scientific classification
- Kingdom: Animalia
- Phylum: Chordata
- Class: Actinopterygii
- Order: Acanthuriformes
- Family: Lutjanidae
- Genus: Lutjanus
- Species: L. indicus

Binomial name
- Lutjanus indicus Allen, White & Erdmann, 2013

= Lutjanus indicus =

Species of fish

Lutjanus indicus, the striped snapper, is a species of marine ray-finned fish, a snapper belonging to the family Lutjanidae. It is native to the Indian Ocean.

== Taxonomy ==
Lutjanus indicus was first formally described in 2013 by Gerald R. Allen, William T. White and Mark V. Erdmann with the type locality given as Trincomalee in Sri Lanka. The specific name indicus refers to the Indian Ocean. Within the genus Lutjanus, L. indicus is closest to the Western Pacific L. russellii.

== Description ==
Lutjanus indicus has a spindle shaped body with a steeply sloped forehead and a large mouth, the maxilla reaching the centreline of the large eyes. The upper jaw has two rows of teeth, the outer row of 14-16 smaller canines, plus a pair of enlarged canines being larger than the inner row of patches of tiny teeth, the lower jaw has 14-18 larger teeth in its outer row with inner rows made up of small bristle-like teeth. The vomerine teeth are arranged in a crescent-shaped patch with a rearwards extendion and there is a patch of grain-like teeth on the tongue. The incision and knob on the preoperculum are weakly developed. The dorsal fin has 10 spines and 13-14 soft rays while the anal fin contains 3 spines and 8 soft rays. The caudal fin is truncate. The maximum recorded standard length for this species is 22.6 cm (8.9 in). The overall colour is pale grey, shading to silvery white on the lower part of the body, there are seven dark brown to yellow horizontal stripes on the back of the head and flanks, there is an obvious black spot, larger than the eye, on the back underneath the first 6-7 dorsal fin rays, extending to just below the lateral line.

== Distribution and habitat ==
Lutjanus indicus is found in the Indian Ocean. It is known with certainty to occur in the Persian Gulf and Sea of Oman, along the northern shores of the Indian Ocean to eastern India, the Gulf of Mannar and to western Thailand. It appears to be the western sister species of L. russellii and records of that species from the Red Sea, Eastern Africa, Madagascar, the Seychelles and the Mascarenes are likely to be of L. indicus but this needs confirmation. They have been observed in coral reef habitat at depths of between 5 and 15 m (16 and 49 ft), although it has been trawled from as deep as 50 m (160 ft). It is thought that like L. russellii the juveniles inhabit brackish habitats such as mangroves and estuaries, even reaching into the lower parts of freshwater streams.

== Biology ==
Lutjanus indicus is a newly described species and little is known about its biology. It has been encountered as single fish or in small groups of up to 5 individuals. It is a predatory species.

== Fisheries ==
Lutjanus indicus is frequently recorded in fish markets and is caught by commercial fisheries as both an intended quarry and as bycatch.
