= Domibacillus indicus =

Scientific classification
- Domain: Bacteria
- Kingdom: Bacillati
- Phylum: Bacillota
- Class: Bacilli
- Order: Bacillales
- Family: Bacillaceae
- Genus: Domibacillus
- Species: D. indicus

Binomial name
- Domibacillus indicus Sharma et al. 2014

Type strain
- DSM 28032, MCC 2255, SD111

Species of bacterium

Domibacillus indicus is a Gram-positive, aerobic, rod-shaped and non-motile bacterium from the genus Domibacillus which has been isolated from marine sediments from Lakshadweep in India.
