= Armatophallus indicus =

Scientific classification
- Domain: Eukaryota
- Kingdom: Animalia
- Phylum: Arthropoda
- Class: Insecta
- Order: Lepidoptera
- Family: Gelechiidae
- Genus: Armatophallus
- Species: A. indicus

Binomial name
- Armatophallus indicus Bidzilya, 2015

Species of moth

Armatophallus indicus is a moth of the family Gelechiidae. It is found in India (Rajasthan).

The wingspan is about 12 mm for males and 14.6 mm for females. Adults have been recorded on wing in late November.

== Etymology ==
The species name refers to the distribution of the species.
