= Streptomyces indicus =

Scientific classification
- Domain: Bacteria
- Kingdom: Bacillati
- Phylum: Actinomycetota
- Class: Actinomycetes
- Order: Streptomycetales
- Family: Streptomycetaceae
- Genus: Streptomyces
- Species: S. indicus

Binomial name
- Streptomyces indicus Luo et al. 2011

Type strain
- CGMCC 4.5727, DSM 42001, IH32-1

Species of bacterium

Streptomyces indicus is a bacterium species from the genus of Streptomyces which has been isolated from deep sea sediments from the Indian Ocean in India.

== See also ==
- List of Streptomyces species
