= Dohertyorsidis indicus =

Scientific classification
- Kingdom: Animalia
- Phylum: Arthropoda
- Class: Insecta
- Order: Coleoptera
- Suborder: Polyphaga
- Infraorder: Cucujiformia
- Family: Cerambycidae
- Genus: Dohertyorsidis
- Species: D. indicus

Binomial name
- Dohertyorsidis indicus Breuning, 1982

Species of beetle

Dohertyorsidis indicus is a species of beetle in the family Cerambycidae. It was described by Stephan von Breuning in 1982.
