= Caliothrips indicus =

Scientific classification
- Kingdom: Animalia
- Phylum: Arthropoda
- Class: Insecta
- Order: Thysanoptera
- Family: Thripidae
- Genus: Caliothrips
- Species: C. indicus

Binomial name
- Caliothrips indicus (Bagnall, 1913)

Species of thrips

Caliothrips indicus is a species of thrips. It is a pest of millets.
