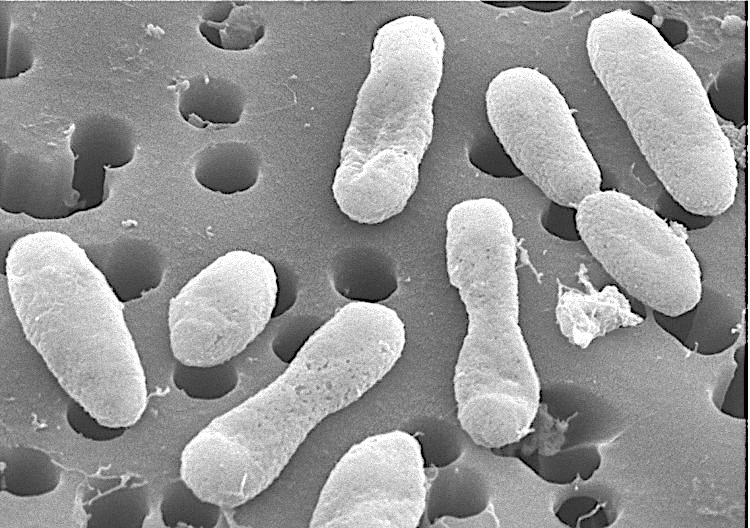
- Roseobacter strain HIMB11

Scientific classification
- Domain: Bacteria
- Kingdom: Pseudomonadati
- Phylum: Pseudomonadota
- Class: Alphaproteobacteria
- Order: Rhodobacterales
- Family: Roseobacteraceae; Liang et al. 2021

Type genus
- Roseobacter Shiba 1991

= Roseobacteraceae =

Family of bacteria

Roseobacteraceae is a family of bacteria. As of October 2026, almost 150 species were assigned to the family. Many are of marine origin. In the nutrient-poor open ocean, they can draw on a comparatively wide range of metabolic processes to compensate for the scarcity of nutrients. Many are able to use a form of photosynthesis to obtain energy. This produces only ATP, and the energy yield is relatively low; it serves only to supplement the energy obtained through respiration. Such species are referred to as aerobic anoxygenic phototrophic bacteria. Some are able to use the greenhouse-relevant gas carbon monoxide, and many produce the climate-relevant gas dimethyl sulfide by breaking down algal remains. Members of the Roseobacteraceae lineage therefore play an important role in the global carbon and sulfur cycles.

== Characteristics ==
Roseobacteraceae comprise phenotypically and metabolically diverse bacteria, including photoheterotrophic and chemoheterotrophic species. Members have been isolated from marine, hypersaline and terrestrial habitats. Many originate from environments containing at least 3.5% NaCl, and many require NaCl for growth. The G+C content is 51.7–72.1%.

Both motile and non-motile members occur; motile representatives may possess polar or subpolar flagella. Cell division occurs by binary fission, with budding also observed in some species. Some members produce pigments, and some accumulate polyhydroxybutyrate as a storage compound.

== Metabolism and growth ==
The main respiratory quinone – in some species the only one – is ubiquinone-10, as in almost all members of the class Alphaproteobacteria. The species are metabolically very diverse. Both photoheterotrophic and chemoheterotrophic species occur. Many are of marine origin. Several species have been isolated from environments with high salinity (i.e. ≥3.5% NaCl). Many require sodium chloride (NaCl) for growth. The degradation of the algal sulfur compound dimethylsulfoniopropionate (DMSP), either by demethylation, by cleavage, or by both, is a capability common to the species. Many of the species also possess an acyl-homoserine lactone-based quorum sensing system.

The family also includes species that oxidize iron in addition to sulfide. These include Rhodovulum iodosum and Rhodovulum robiginosum; these bacteria additionally require organic compounds such as acetic acid to do so. They are therefore not chemolithoautotrophic.

Some members, such as Roseobacter denitrificans, are capable of aerobic anoxygenic photosynthesis (aerobic anoxygenic phototrophs, AAnP or AAP). Although this type of photosynthesis takes place in the presence of oxygen (aerobic), as plant photosynthesis does, water is not used (unlike in plant photosynthesis) and therefore no oxygen is produced (anoxygenic). Only ATP is produced; no cell mass is built. The bacteria are therefore not photoautotrophic but depend on the additional uptake of carbon from organic sources. This is referred to as photoheterotrophic metabolism. In the Roseobacteraceae, bacteriochlorophyll a is used for aerobic anoxygenic photosynthesis. Species that possess bacteriochlorophyll a are found, for example, in Dinoroseobacter, Jannaschia, Loktanella, Marivita, Roseobacter, Sulfitobacter and Thalassobacter.

Because of a much lower bacteriochlorophyll a content, a lower ratio of antenna complexes to photosynthetic reaction centres, and the absence of extensive intracellular membrane systems, the energy yield of aerobic anoxygenic phototrophs is considerably lower than that of photoautotrophic bacteria. This metabolic pathway therefore serves only to supplement energy production.

Denitrifiers also occur in the family, such as Roseobacter denitrificans.

== Taxonomy ==
Roseobacteraceae was proposed in 2021 by Liang and colleagues to accommodate the roseobacter clade, an informally named group previously classified within Rhodobacteraceae. Its type genus is Roseobacter Shiba 1991.

The proposal was based on an analysis of 331 type-strain genomes representing 119 genera of Rhodobacteraceae as then classified. A phylogeny reconstructed from 140 core protein-coding genes resolved two major monophyletic lineages. The roseobacter clade received 100% bootstrap support and was distinguished from the remaining Rhodobacteraceae by genomic comparisons and analyses of phenotypic and ecological characteristics, supporting its recognition as a separate family.

The study also demonstrated limitations of classification based solely on 16S rRNA gene sequences within this group. The 16S rRNA gene phylogeny was poorly resolved and did not distinguish the two major lineages recovered by the core-genome analysis. The authors combined genomic, phylogenetic and phenotypic evidence to revise several polyphyletic and paraphyletic genera within the broader Rhodobacteraceae assemblage.

These changes formed part of a broader revision of Rhodobacteraceae. Earlier phylogenomic work had established Stappiaceae and Ahrensiaceae in 2020 to accommodate other genera previously assigned to the family. In 2022, the name Paracoccaceae was validly published for the recircumscribed family containing Rhodobacter, replacing the illegitimate name Rhodobacteraceae. The type genus of Paracoccaceae is Paracoccus Davis 1969 (Approved Lists 1980).

The following is a list of selected genera (As of October 2026):

- Actibacterium Lucena et al. 2012
- Aestuariivita Park et al. 2014
- Albibacillus Hördt et al. 2020
- Antarctobacter Labrenz et al. 1998
- Aquicoccus Feng et al. 2018
- Brevirhabdus Wu et al. 2015
- Cribrihabitans Chen et al. 2014
- Dinoroseobacter Biebl et al. 2005
- Epibacterium Penesyan et al. 2013
- Hasllibacter Kim et al. 2012
- Jannaschia Wagner-Döbler et al. 2003
- Leisingera Schaefer et al. 2002
- Litoreibacter Romanenko et al. 2011
- Loktanella Van Trappen et al. 2004
- Lutimaribacter Yoon et al. 2009
- Marimonas Thongphrom et al. 2017
- Marivita Hwang et al. 2009
- Oceanicola Cho and Giovannoni 2004
- Octadecabacter Gosink et al. 1998
- Phaeobacter Martens et al. 2006
- Pseudoponticoccus Liang et al. 2022
- Pseudosulfitobacter Liang et al. 2022
- Roseicyclus Rathgeber et al. 2005
- Roseobacter Shiba 1991
- Roseovarius Labrenz et al. 1999
- Ruegeria Uchino et al. 1999
- Sagittula Gonzalez et al. 1997
- Salinihabitans Yoon et al. 2009
- Salipiger Martínez-Cánovas et al. 2004
- Sulfitobacter Sorokin 1996
- Tateyamaria Kurahashi and Yokota 2008
- Wenxinia Ying et al. 2007
- Youngimonas Hameed et al. 2014

== Ecology ==
Roseobacteraceae are among the most abundant bacterial groups in marine ecosystems. Some have also been isolated from high-salinity (halophilic) and terrestrial environments. Salipiger mucosus, for instance, grows optimally in a medium containing 9–10% NaCl. The species was isolated from a hypersaline habitat in south-eastern Spain. Some species also come from the deep sea, for example Thiobacimonas profunda, Salipiger abyssi, Salipiger nanhaiensis, two species of Roseovarius (R. halotolerans and R. indicus), Palleronia abyssalis and Roseivivax marinus.

In addition to free-living species, the family includes members associated with various algae and other marine organisms. Dinoroseobacter shibae, for example, was isolated from dinoflagellates. The relationship is probably a symbiosis: the bacterium produces vitamins B1 and B12, and in return probably receives photosynthetic products from the alga. The genome of Dinoroseobacter shibae has been fully sequenced. Epibacterium ulvae was isolated from the surface of seaweeds of the genus Ulva, Litoreibacter albidus from a sea snail (Umbonium) in sediment of the Sea of Japan, and Hasllibacter halocynthiae from a sea squirt of the genus Halocynthia. Furthermore, consistent associations or symbiotic relationships are known between diatoms and various Rhodobacteraceae species, including Silicibacter, Ruegeria, Sulfitobacter, Roseobacter, Roseovarius and Donghicola.

Only a few pathogenic species occur within the Roseobacteraceae. Some examples are found in the genus Roseovarius. R. crassostreae causes the oyster disease "juvenile oyster disease" (JOD), also called "Roseovarius oyster disease" (ROD). The disease affects oysters of the species Crassostrea virginica on the north-east coast of the United States.

Cryophilic ("cold-loving") species have also been isolated from polar regions. These include species of Octadecabacter, which occur in sea ice habitats. Species of Loktanella have been isolated from microbial mats in Antarctic lakes. Brevirhabdus pacifica was isolated from a deep-sea sediment sample from a hydrothermal vent field.

Soil-dwelling members are also known, for example species of "Ketogulonicigenium". The strain Citreicella (Salipiger) sp. SE45 was isolated from detritus of the grass Sporobolus alterniflorus in salt marshes in the south-eastern United States.

The elements chromium and copper, which are known to be toxic to many organisms, showed positive effects on some bacterial groups of the Roseobacteraceae. Species of the genus Rubellimicrobium, for example, tolerate chromium (Cr).

=== Formation of dimethyl sulfide ===
Structure of dimethyl sulfide

Structure of dimethylsulfoniopropionate

Strains of Roseobacteraceae were among the first aerobic bacteria isolated that grow on dimethylsulfoniopropionate (DMSP). They are able to break down the compound, forming the climate-relevant gas dimethyl sulfide (C_{2}H_{6}S, abbr. DMS). This is also one of the reasons for their close association with algal blooms, since large amounts of dimethylsulfoniopropionate are produced during blooms. They make a large contribution to the global production of this gas.

DMSP can be degraded either by cleavage or by demethylation/demethiolation. Some members of the Roseobacteraceae possess both the cleavage and the demethylation/demethiolation pathways. The two DMSP degradation pathways have fundamentally different biogeochemical consequences. When DMSP is cleaved into several small compounds, the bacterium uses only the carbon, and the dimethyl sulfide formed is released into the environment. The demethylation/demethiolation pathway, by contrast, leads to the incorporation of both the carbon- and sulfur-containing parts of DMSP into microbial cells, thereby prolonging their residence time in biomass.

The production of dimethyl sulfide via cleavage increases the formation of cloud condensation nuclei, thus promoting cloud formation and counteracting global warming.

Species that use DMSP include Ruegeria pomeroyi, whose sulfur metabolism has been studied extensively. Further examples are species of Roseovarius, Sulfitobacter, Silicibacter, Oceanibulbus and Phaeobacter.

=== Use of other sulfur compounds ===
Members of the Roseobacteraceae are also involved in numerous other reactions with sulfur compounds. Various bacteria of this group can also use methanethiol (CH_{3}SH) and methanesulfonate (CH_{3}SO_{3}^{−}). Inorganic sulfur compounds can also be oxidized by various species. Sulfitobacter pontiacus, for example, oxidizes sulfite, elemental sulfur and thiosulfate to sulfate. It occurs at the oxic/anoxic interface of the Black Sea. Its sulfite-oxidizing activity is almost as high as that of autotrophic inorganic sulfur oxidizers. Thiosulfate increases the growth yield of some strains by up to 45%. However, these bacteria are not known to grow lithoautotrophically. Genes encoding the oxidation of CO to CO_{2} have also been found in the genome of Sulfitobacter pontiacus. The absence of RuBisCO or any other complete pathway for autotrophic growth suggests that the bacterium gains energy, but not carbon, from the oxidation of CO. Its metabolism is therefore lithoheterotrophic, with organic sources required for carbon.

== Industrial use ==
Some species, such as strains of Phaeobacter, produce the antibiotic tropodithietic acid (TDA).

The use of some species, including strains of Phaeobacter, as probiotic bacteria in aquaculture has been investigated. "Ketogulonicigenium" is used in the industrial production of vitamin C. A tyrosinase (csTyr) has been isolated from a strain of the genus Citreicella (Salipiger). Tyrosinases are enzymes that can be used for the biosynthesis of catechol compounds without additional cofactors. The newly isolated tyrosinase enzyme csTyr can be used to produce piceatannol, a resveratrol derivative with an additional hydroxy group. It has stronger antitumour and antioxidant properties than resveratrol.
