= Tropone =

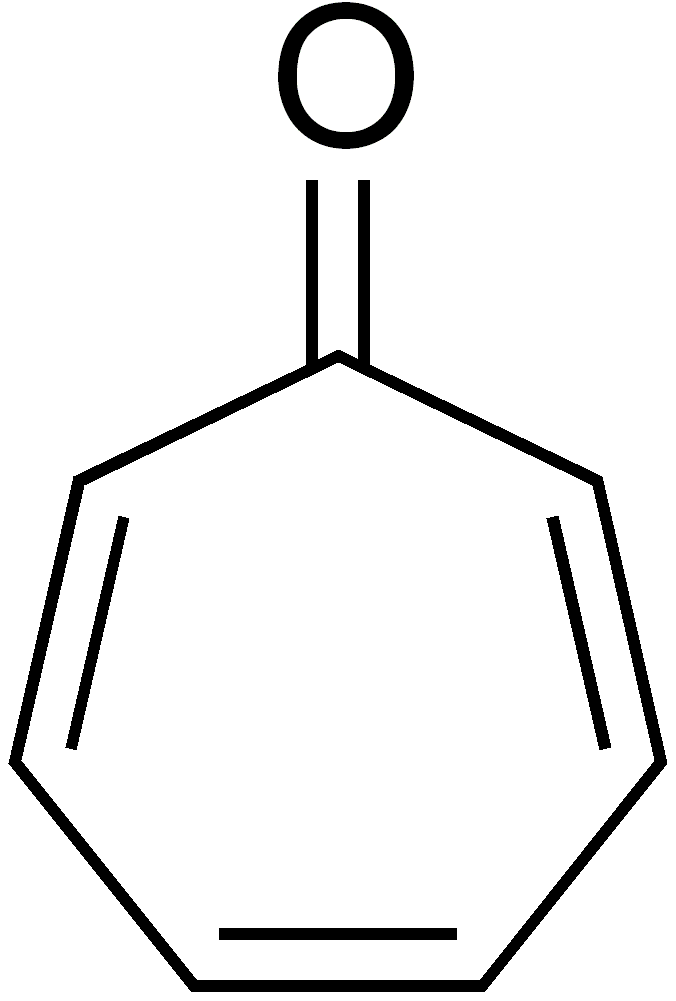
Structure of tropone
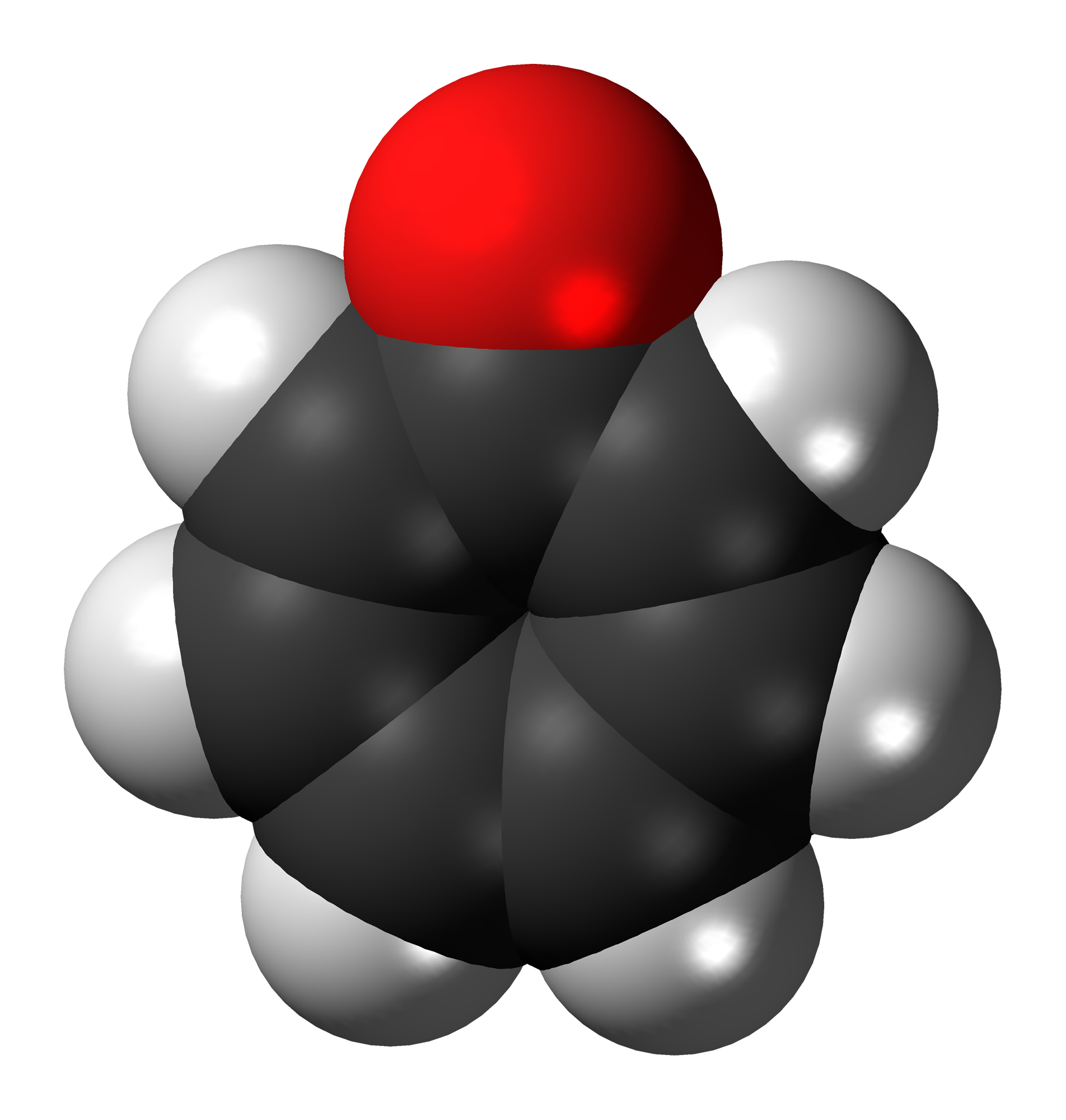
Space-filling model of tropone

Names
- Preferred IUPAC name Cyclohepta-2,4,6-trien-1-one
- Other names Cyclohepta-2,4,6-trienone

Identifiers
CAS Number	539-80-0
3D model (JSmol)	Interactive image
ChemSpider	10419
ECHA InfoCard	100.007.933
PubChem CID	10881
UNII	CO48X7SUFH
CompTox Dashboard (EPA)	DTXSID60202169
- InChI: InChI=1S/C7H6O/c8-7-5-3-1-2-4-6-7/h1-6H Key: QVWDCTQRORVHHT-UHFFFAOYSA-N; InChI=1/C7H6O/c8-7-5-3-1-2-4-6-7/h1-6H Key: QVWDCTQRORVHHT-UHFFFAOYAM
- SMILES: O=C\1/C=C\C=C/C=C/1

Properties
Chemical formula	C_{7}H_{6}O
Molar mass	106.12 g/mol
Density	1.094 g/mL
Boiling point	113 °C (235 °F; 386 K) (15 mmHg)

Hazards
Flash point	> 113 °C (235 °F; 386 K)
- Except where otherwise noted, data are given for materials in their standard state (at 25 °C [77 °F], 100 kPa). verify (what is ?) Infobox references

Tropone or 2,4,6-cycloheptatrien-1-one is an organic compound with some importance in organic chemistry as a non-benzenoid aromatic. The compound consists of a ring of seven carbon atoms with three conjugated alkene groups and a ketone group. The related compound tropolone (2-hydroxy-2,4,6-cycloheptatrien-1-one) has an additional alcohol (or an enol including the double bond) group next to the ketone. Tropones are uncommon in natural products, with the notable exception of the 2-hydroxyl derivatives, which are called tropolones.

Tropone has been known since 1951 and is also called cycloheptatrienylium oxide. The name tropolone was coined by M. J. S. Dewar in 1945 in connection to perceived aromatic properties.

== Properties ==
Dewar in 1945 proposed that tropones could have aromatic properties. The carbonyl group is more polarized as a result of the triene ring, giving a partial positive charge on the carbon atom (A) and a partial negative charge on oxygen. In an extreme case, the carbon atom has a full positive charge (B) forming a tropylium ion ring which is an aromatic 6 electron system (C).

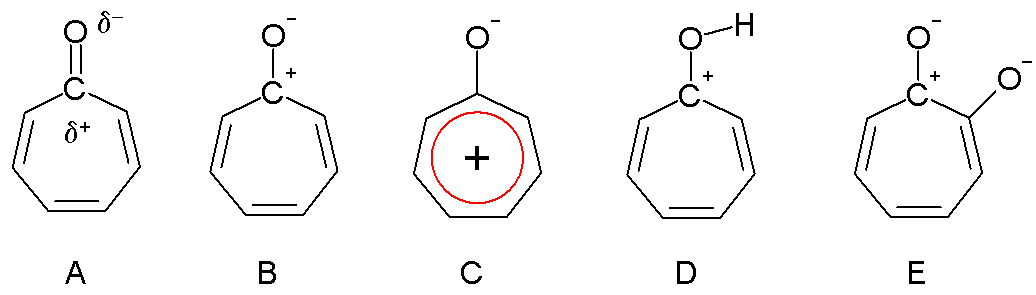
Tropone structures

Tropones are also basic (D) as a result of the aromatic stabilization. This property can be observed in the ease of salt formation with acids. The dipole moment for tropone is 4.17 D compared to a value of only 3.04 D for cycloheptanone. This difference is consistent with stabilization of the dipolar resonance structure.

== Synthesis ==
Numerous methods exist for the organic synthesis of tropones and its derivatives. Two selected methods for the synthesis of tropone are by selenium dioxide oxidation of cycloheptatriene and indirectly from tropinone by a Hofmann elimination and a bromination.

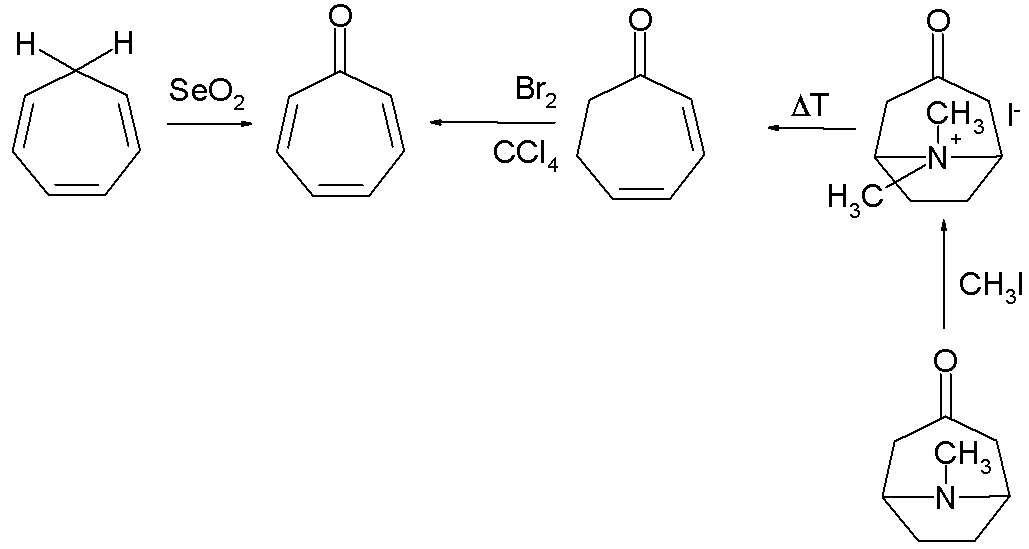
Tropone synthesis

== Reactions ==
Tropone undergoes ring contraction to benzoic acid with potassium hydroxide at elevated temperature. Many derivatives also contract to the corresponding arenes. Tropone reacts in electrophilic substitution, for instance with bromine, but the reaction proceeds through the 1,2-addition product and is not an electrophilic aromatic substitution.

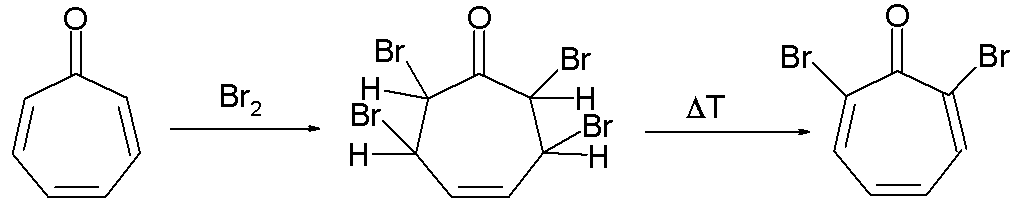

Tropone derivatives also react in nucleophilic substitution very much like in nucleophilic aromatic substitution.

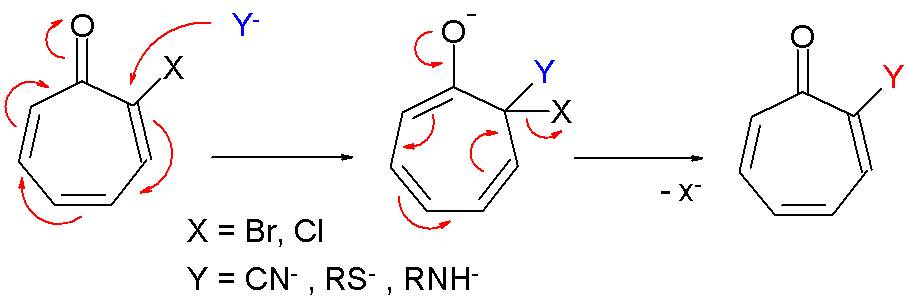

Tropone is also found to react in an [8+3]annulation with a cinnamic aldehyde

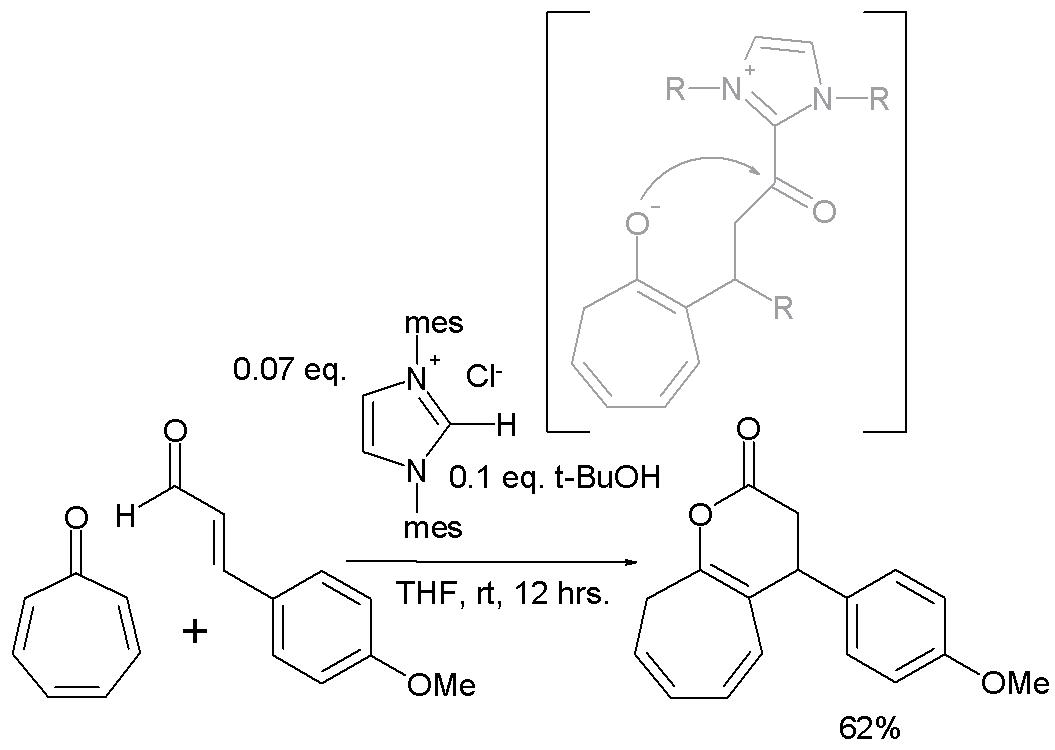

=== Diene character ===
Tropone behaves as a diene in a Diels-Alder reactions, for instance with maleic anhydride. Similarly, it forms adducts with iron tricarbonyl, akin to (butadiene)iron tricarbonyl.

== Derivatives ==
Name	Chemical structure	Natural sources
Tropolone		Pseudomonas lindbergii, Pseudomonas plantarii
Hinokitiol		Cupressaceae trees
Stipitatic acid		Talaromyces stipitatus
Tropodithietic acid		Phaeobacter piscinae, Phaeobacter inhibens, Phaeobacter gallaeciensis
Colchicine		Colchicum autumnale, Gloriosa superba

Other tropone derivatives include puberulonic and puberulic acids, roseobacticides, pernambucone, crototropone, orobanone.
