= Roseovarius nubinhibens =

Scientific classification
- Domain: Bacteria
- Kingdom: Pseudomonadati
- Phylum: Pseudomonadota
- Class: Alphaproteobacteria
- Order: Rhodobacterales
- Family: Roseobacteraceae
- Genus: Roseovarius
- Species: R. nubinhibens

Binomial name
- Roseovarius nubinhibens González et al. 2003

Species of bacterium

Roseovarius nubinhibens is a species of Gram-negative, rod-shaped, aerobic dimethylsulfoniopropionate-demethylating bacteria. Its type strain is ISM^{T} (=ATCC BAA-591^{T} =DSM 15170^{T}).
