= Alison Buchan =

Microbiologist

- Education: University of Georgia
- Scientific career
- Thesis: Ecology and genetics of aromatic compound degradation in the roseobacter lineage of marine bacteria (2001)

Alison Buchan is an American microbiologist. She is the Carolyn Fite Professor at the University of Tennessee. She is known for her work on bacteria in natural environments, especially bacteria within the Roseobacter group. In 2022 she was named as a fellow of the American Academy of Microbiology.

== Education and career ==
Buchan received a B.Sc. from James Madison University in 1994. She then moved to the University of Georgia where she earned a M.Sc. (1997) and a Ph.D. (2001). She was a postdoctoral investigator at Yale University from 2003 until 2005 at which point she moved to the University of Tennessee. In 2016 she was promoted to professor, and as of 2022 she is the Carolyn Fite Professor.

== Research ==
Buchan's early research examined biochemical pathways used by Roseobacter, a common marine bacteria, and the chemical compounds used by Roseobacter as they grow on surfaces. Buchan's research revealed how viruses change the chemical compounds released by bacteria and how heterotrophic bacteria alter the organic carbon produced by marine phytoplankton. She has also examined the interactions between Roseobacter and the viruses that infect them.

== Selected publications ==
- Buchan, Alison; Collier, Lauren S.; Neidle, Ellen L.; Moran, Mary Ann (2000). "Key Aromatic-Ring-Cleaving Enzyme, Protocatechuate 3,4-Dioxygenase, in the Ecologically Important Marine Roseobacter Lineage". Applied and Environmental Microbiology. 66 (11): 4662–4672. Bibcode:2000ApEnM..66.4662B. doi:10.1128/AEM.66.11.4662-4672.2000. ISSN 0099-2240. PMC 92364. PMID 11055908.
- Buchan, Alison; González, José M.; Moran, Mary Ann (2005). "Overview of the Marine Roseobacter Lineage". Applied and Environmental Microbiology. 71 (10): 5665–5677. Bibcode:2005ApEnM..71.5665B. doi:10.1128/AEM.71.10.5665-5677.2005. ISSN 0099-2240. PMC 1265941. PMID 16204474.
- Buchan, Alison; LeCleir, Gary R.; Gulvik, Christopher A.; González, José M. (2014). "Master recyclers: features and functions of bacteria associated with phytoplankton blooms". Nature Reviews Microbiology. 12 (10): 686–698. doi:10.1038/nrmicro3326. ISSN 1740-1526. PMID 25134618. S2CID 26684717.
- Moran, Mary Ann; Buchan, Alison; González, José M.; Heidelberg, John F.; Whitman, William B.; Kiene, Ronald P.; Henriksen, James R.; King, Gary M.; Belas, Robert; Fuqua, Clay; Brinkac, Lauren; Lewis, Matt; Johri, Shivani; Weaver, Bruce; Pai, Grace (2004). "Genome sequence of Silicibacter pomeroyi reveals adaptations to the marine environment". Nature. 432 (7019): 910–913. Bibcode:2004Natur.432..910M. doi:10.1038/nature03170. ISSN 0028-0836. PMID 15602564. S2CID 4429074.

== Awards and honors ==
In 2022 Buchan was elected a fellow of the American Academy of Microbiology. That same year she received the University of Tennessee SEC Faculty Achievement award In 2025, she was inducated as a fellow of the American Assocatiion for the Advancement of Science [https://news.utk.edu/2025/03/27/four-researchers-honored-by-aaas-as-lifetime-fellows/}The AAAS Council elects Fellows annually for their lifetime achievements.
