= Roseovarius albus =

Scientific classification
- Domain: Bacteria
- Kingdom: Pseudomonadati
- Phylum: Pseudomonadota
- Class: Alphaproteobacteria
- Order: Rhodobacterales
- Family: Roseobacteraceae
- Genus: Roseovarius
- Species: R. albus

Binomial name
- Roseovarius albus Lucena et al. 2014

Type strain
- 4SM10, CECT 7450, CIP 109942, KCTC 22653

Synonyms
- Roseovarius litoralis

Species of bacterium

Roseovarius albus is a Gram-negative, aerobic and heterotrophic bacterium from the genus Roseovarius which has been isolated from seawater from the Mediterranean Sea from Spain.
