= Pseudooceanicola antarcticus =

Scientific classification
- Domain: Bacteria
- Kingdom: Pseudomonadati
- Phylum: Pseudomonadota
- Class: Alphaproteobacteria
- Order: Rhodobacterales
- Family: Rhodobacteraceae
- Genus: Pseudomaribius
- Species: P. antarcticus

Binomial name
- Pseudomaribius antarcticus (Huo et al. 2014)Lai et al. 2015

Type strain
- CGMCC 1.12662, LMG 27868, Ar-45

Synonyms
- Oceanicola antarcticus

Species of bacterium

Pseudooceanicola antarcticus is a Gram-negative, aerobic, moderately halophilic and rod-shaped bacterium from the genus of Pseudooceanicola which has been isolated from seawater.
