= Marine-derived compound =

Marine-derived compounds, or natural compounds of marine origin, or marine-derived products (in the context of chemical compounds produced by marine organisms) and/or marine natural products (MNPs) are organic compounds that have been isolated from the marine environment (for example, from living organisms), which can be alkaloids (marine alkaloids), complex organic cpmpounds (such as peptides, proteins, and complex carbohydrates); certainly, just like organisms that live on land, these compounds often perform the function of chemical defense.

== Occurrence ==
=== Marine alkaloids ===
Marine alkaloids are naturally occurring, organic, nitrogen-containing heterocyclic compounds isolated from marine sponges, algae, mollusks, ascidians, and others, as well as their associated bacteria and fungi.

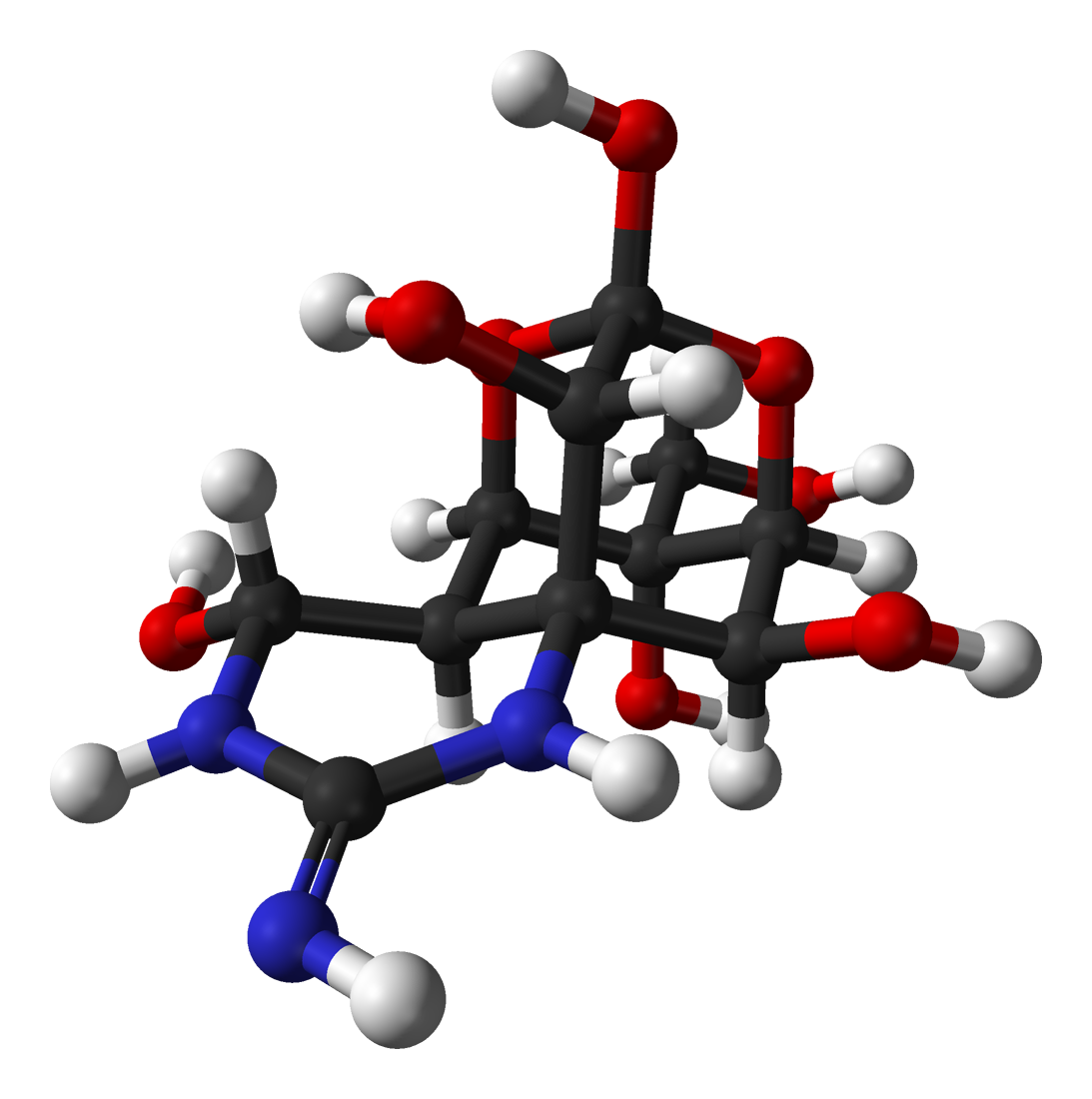
Tetrodotoxin

==== Tetrodotoxin ====
Tetrodotoxin is an extremely potent neurotoxin found in marine animals.

The literature describes data on at least 150 strains of tetrodotoxin(TTX)-producing bacteria. Representatives of the genus Vibrio, found in many TTX-bearing animals, account for more than 30% of all TTX-producing strains. Most studies point to a link between tetrodotoxin production and the presence of Vibrio alginolyticus in the microflora of marine animals.

Representatives of the bacterial genus Bacillus account for approximately 15% of the isolated tetrodotoxin-producing strains; Pseudomonas, Aeromonas, Alteromonas, Streptomyces, and Roseobacter strains make up to 7% of tetrodotoxin-producing bacteria, while other bacterial genera are represented by only a single strain each.

Fish of the family Tetraodontidae accumulate tetrodotoxin, encompassing dozens of species (for example, species of the genus Takifugu). In these fish, the toxin is concentrated in their kidneys, ovaries and gallbladder, liver, and skin, with the Takifugu rubripes (fugu) being the most famous example.

==== Others ====
5-Bromo-DMT is a psychedelic drug found in some sea sponges.
