= Roseovarius aquimarinus =

Scientific classification
- Domain: Bacteria
- Kingdom: Pseudomonadati
- Phylum: Pseudomonadota
- Class: Alphaproteobacteria
- Order: Rhodobacterales
- Family: Roseobacteraceae
- Genus: Roseovarius
- Species: R. aquimarinus

Binomial name
- Roseovarius aquimarinus Kang et al. 2015

Type strain
- CCUG 64792, KCTC 32014, CAU1059

Species of bacterium

Roseovarius aquimarinus is a Gram-negative, rod-shaped, non-spore-forming, facultatively anaerobic and motile bacterium from the genus Roseovarius which has been isolated from seawater from Jeju Island in Korea.
