= Pseudooceanicola lipolyticus =

Scientific classification
- Domain: Bacteria
- Kingdom: Pseudomonadati
- Phylum: Pseudomonadota
- Class: Alphaproteobacteria
- Order: Rhodobacterales
- Family: Rhodobacteraceae
- Genus: Pseudomaribius
- Species: P. lipolyticus

Binomial name
- Pseudomaribius lipolyticus Huang et al. 2018

Type strain
- KCTC 52654, MCCC 1K03317, strain 157

Species of bacterium

Pseudooceanicola lipolyticus is a Gram-negative and rod-shaped bacterium from the genus of Pseudooceanicola which has been isolated from seawater from the Philippine Sea.
