= Marivita lacus =

Scientific classification
- Domain: Bacteria
- Kingdom: Pseudomonadati
- Phylum: Pseudomonadota
- Class: Alphaproteobacteria
- Order: Rhodobacterales
- Family: Roseobacteraceae
- Genus: Marivita
- Species: M. lacus

Binomial name
- Marivita lacus Zhong et al. 2015Yoon et al. 2012

Type strain
- CGMCC 1.12478, JCM 19516, strain TS-T44

Species of bacterium

Marivita lacus is a Gram-negative, aerobic, strictly heterotrophic, non-endospore-forming and heterotrophic bacterium from the genus Marivita which has been isolated from the Tuosu Lake from the Qaidam Basin in China.
