= Roseovarius antarcticus =

Scientific classification
- Domain: Bacteria
- Kingdom: Pseudomonadati
- Phylum: Pseudomonadota
- Class: Alphaproteobacteria
- Order: Rhodobacterales
- Family: Roseobacteraceae
- Genus: Roseovarius
- Species: R. antarcticus

Binomial name
- Roseovarius antarcticus Deng et al. 2015

Type strain
- CCTCC AB2014072, LMG 28420, strain M-S13-148

Species of bacterium

Roseovarius antarcticus is a Gram-negative and aerobic bacterium from the genus Roseovarius which has been isolated from a decayed bone from a whale from the eastern coast of King George Island in Antarctica.
