= Mary Moran =

Mary Moran may refer to:

- Mary Moran (camogie) (fl. 1960s–2010s), Irish camogie player and manager
- Mary Moran (politician) (born 1960), Irish Labour Party Senator, member of the 24th Seanad
- Mary Nimmo Moran (1842–1889), American landscape artist
- Mary C. Moran (born 1933), former mayor of Bridgeport, Connecticut
- Mary Ann Moran (fl. 1970s–2020s), professor of marine sciences
- Mary Margaret Moran (1948–1975), American murder victim and former nurse

== See also ==
- Mary Morain (1911–1999), American therapist, social reformer, and secular humanist
