= Roseovarius confluentis =

Scientific classification
- Domain: Bacteria
- Kingdom: Pseudomonadati
- Phylum: Pseudomonadota
- Class: Alphaproteobacteria
- Order: Rhodobacterales
- Family: Roseobacteraceae
- Genus: Roseovarius
- Species: R. confluentis

Binomial name
- Roseovarius confluentis Jia et al. 2017

Type strain
- JCM 31541, KACC 18598, strain SAG6

Species of bacterium

Roseovarius confluentis is a Gram-negative and strictly aerobic bacterium from the genus Roseovarius which has been isolated from estuary sediments from Korea.
