= Dinoroseobacter shibae =

Scientific classification
- Domain: Bacteria
- Kingdom: Pseudomonadati
- Phylum: Pseudomonadota
- Class: Alphaproteobacteria
- Order: Rhodobacterales
- Family: Rhodobacteraceae
- Genus: Dinoroseobacter
- Species: D. shibae

Binomial name
- Dinoroseobacter shibae Biebl et al. 2005

Species of bacterium

Dinoroseobacter shibae is a facultative anaerobic anoxygenic photoheterotroph belonging to the family, Rhodobacteraceae. First isolated from washed cultivated dinoflagellates, they have been reported to have mutualistic as well as pathogenic symbioses with dinoflagellates.

== Cell morphology and physiology ==
D. shibae cells are Gram-negative cocci, or occasionally ovoid rods that measure 0.3 – 0.7 μm in width and 0.3 – 1.0 μm in length. They are motile and have a single polar flagellum.

When grown in the dark, colonies have a distinct pink or light red pigmentation, while under strong illumination they are beige. They contain bacteriochlorophyll a and the carotenoid pigment spheroidenone and have absorption spectrum peaks at 804 and 868 nm. The carotenoid leads to an extended absorption spectrum including 400 – 600 nm. D. shibae cells use light as a supplementary energy source and don't use it to fix inorganic carbon. Colonies grown on complex agar media appear deep red in color.

D. shibae is a facultative anaerobe that requires 1-7% salinity and grows between 15 and 38 °C with an optima temperature of 33 °C. Its optimal pH range is 6.5 – 9.0. While most of the organisms in the Roseobacter clade are obligate aerobes, D. shibae is able to grow anaerobically using electron acceptors nitrate and dimethyl sulfoxide. It has a complete denitrification pathway for energy production. A variety of organic substrates including acetate, succinate, fumarate, malate, lactate, citrate, glutamate, pyruvate, glucose, fructose and glycerol can support heterotrophic growth. Like others in the Roseobacter clade, ethanol, methanol and butyrate do not support growth.

D. shibae can synthesize vitamins $\ce{B_1}$ and $\ce{B_{12}}$, of which its dinoflagellate host is auxotrophic.

== Environment and ecology ==
Members of the Roseobacter clade are widely associated with marine phytoplankton such as dinoflagellates and diatoms in the water column as well as shallow sediments. They play important roles in the carbon cycle by assimilating dissolved organic matter produced by phytoplankton and also in the sulfur cycle by removing DMS from the algal osmolyte dimethylsulfoniopropionate (DMSP). Their close association with eukaryotic phytoplankton is supported by phylogenomic evidence suggesting that the Roseobacter lineage diverged from other Alphaproteobacteria at the same moment as the Mesozoic radiation of phytoplankton.

Traits involved in symbioses of D. shibae include flagellar synthesis and type IV secretion system under the control of N-acyl homoserine lactone intercellular signal molecules (quorum sensing).

D. shibae forms symbioses with Prorocentrum minimum, a toxic red tide-forming dinoflagellate, as well as other dinoflagellates associated with toxic algal blooms. In a mutualistic association, the P. minimum provides carbon sources and some vitamins essential for growth, and while D. shibae provides vitamins $\ce{B_1}$ and $\ce{B_{12}}$. In co-culture, this mutualism changes to pathogenicity as the bacteria induce death in the algae cells, but algicidal compounds produced by D. shibae have yet to be identified. P. minimum has a global marine distribution, suggesting that its symbiont does as well.

== Genome ==
D. shibae's genome is 4417 kbp long, which is in line with other Roseobacter clade genomes. Included in this count are its large circular genome and five circular plasmids. The GC-content of D. shibae is 66%.

Based on comparative sequence analysis of the circular plasmids, they were likely acquired through conjugation and two sister plasmids contain the vir operon encoding the type IV secretion system required for the formation of sex pili. Other traits encoded on the plasmids include degradation of aromatic compounds and carbon monoxide oxidation.

As opposed to ABC transporters, the D. shibae genome suggests a preference for tripartite ATP-independent periplasmic transporters (TRAP) for uptake of nutrients like C4-dicarboxylates, pyruvate, glutamate, sialic acid, ectoine and 2,3-diketogulonate. D. shibae's genome encodes for 27 complete TRAP systems.

== Discovery and Isolation ==
D. shibae was first isolated in 2003 with two strains, both isolated from washed single cells of cultivated marine dinoflagellates (Prorocentrum lima and Alexandrium ostenfeldii).

== Etymology ==
The genus Dinoroseobacter name originates from the Greek dinos meaning whirling rotation and the first part of Dinophyceae (dinoflagellates) from which it was isolated, and Roseobacter a bacterial genus with similar traits. Shibae was named after Professor Tsuneo Shiba who discovered the marine aerobic anoxygenic phototrophic bacteria.
