= Roseovarius litoreus =

Scientific classification
- Domain: Bacteria
- Kingdom: Pseudomonadati
- Phylum: Pseudomonadota
- Class: Alphaproteobacteria
- Order: Rhodobacterales
- Family: Roseobacteraceae
- Genus: Roseovarius
- Species: R. litoreus

Binomial name
- Roseovarius litoreus Jung et al. 2012

Species of bacterium

Roseovarius litoreus is a species of bacteria. It is gram-negative, non-flagellated and ovoid- to rod-shaped. Its type strain is GSW-M15^{T} (=KCTC 23897^{T} = CCUG 62218^{T}).
