= C7H6O =

The molecular formula C_{7}H_{6}O (molar mass: 106.12 g/mol, exact mass: 106.0419 u) may refer to:

- Benzaldehyde, organic compound consisting of a benzene ring with a formyl substituent
- Tropone, or 2,4,6-cycloheptatrien-1-one, a non-benzenoid aromatic
