= Roseovarius atlanticus =

Scientific classification
- Domain: Bacteria
- Kingdom: Pseudomonadati
- Phylum: Pseudomonadota
- Class: Alphaproteobacteria
- Order: Rhodobacterales
- Family: Roseobacteraceae
- Genus: Roseovarius
- Species: R. atlanticus

Binomial name
- Roseovarius atlanticus Li et al. 2016

Type strain
- KCTC 42506, MCCC 1A09786, strain R12B

Species of bacterium

Roseovarius atlanticus is a Gram-negative bacterium from the genus Roseovarius which has been isolated from seawater from the Atlantic Ocean.
