= Marivita byunsanensis =

Scientific classification
- Domain: Bacteria
- Kingdom: Pseudomonadati
- Phylum: Pseudomonadota
- Class: Alphaproteobacteria
- Order: Rhodobacterales
- Family: Roseobacteraceae
- Genus: Marivita
- Species: M. byunsanensis

Binomial name
- Marivita byunsanensis (Yoon et al. 2010) Yoon et al. 2012

Type strain
- CCUG 57612, KCTC 22632

Synonyms
- Gaetbulicola byunsanensis

Species of bacterium

Marivita byunsanensis is a Gram-negative, pleomorphic and non-motile bacterium from the genus Marivita which has been isolated from tidal flat sediments from Byunsan in Korea.
