= Roseovarius halotolerans =

Scientific classification
- Domain: Bacteria
- Kingdom: Pseudomonadati
- Phylum: Pseudomonadota
- Class: Alphaproteobacteria
- Order: Rhodobacterales
- Family: Roseobacteraceae
- Genus: Roseovarius
- Species: R. halotolerans

Binomial name
- Roseovarius halotolerans Oh et al. 2009

Type strain
- CECT 8110, HJ50, KCTC 22224, LMG 24468, strain HJ50

Species of bacterium

Roseovarius halotolerans is a Gram-negative, aerobic and non-motile bacterium from the genus Roseovarius which has been isolated from deep seawater from the Sea of Japan in Korea.
