= Profundibacterium =

Scientific classification
- Domain: Bacteria
- Kingdom: Pseudomonadati
- Phylum: Pseudomonadota
- Class: Alphaproteobacteria
- Order: Rhodobacterales
- Family: Roseobacteraceae
- Genus: Profundibacterium; Lai et al. 2013
- Species: P. mesophilum

Binomial name
- Profundibacterium mesophilum Lai et al. 2013

Genus of bacteria

Profundibacterium is a Gram-negative and strictly aerobic genus of bacteria from the family Roseobacteraceae with one known species, Profundibacterium mesophilum. Profundibacterium mesophilum has been isolated from sea-floor sediments from the Red Sea in Saudi Arabia.
