= Pseudooceanicola =

Scientific classification
- Domain: Bacteria
- Kingdom: Pseudomonadati
- Phylum: Pseudomonadota
- Class: Alphaproteobacteria
- Order: Rhodobacterales
- Family: Rhodobacteraceae
- Genus: Pseudomaribius; Lai et al. 2015

Type species
- Pseudooceanicola atlanticus

Species
- P. antarcticus P. atlanticus P. batsensis P. flagellatus P. lipolyticus P. marinus P. nanhaiensis P. nitratireducens

Genus of bacteria

Pseudooceanicola is a genus of bacteria from the family of Rhodobacteraceae.
