= Roseovarius tolerans =

Scientific classification
- Domain: Bacteria
- Kingdom: Pseudomonadati
- Phylum: Pseudomonadota
- Class: Alphaproteobacteria
- Order: Rhodobacterales
- Family: Roseobacteraceae
- Genus: Roseovarius
- Species: R. tolerans

Binomial name
- Roseovarius tolerans Labrenz et al. 1999

Species of bacterium

Roseovarius tolerans is a species of bacteria and the type species of its genus. It is a budding bacterium with variable production of bacteriochlorophyll a. It is Gram-negative, aerobic, contains storage granules and can be motile. The type strain is EL-172^{T} (= DSM 11457^{T}).
