= Roseovarius aestuariivivens =

Scientific classification
- Domain: Bacteria
- Kingdom: Pseudomonadati
- Phylum: Pseudomonadota
- Class: Alphaproteobacteria
- Order: Rhodobacterales
- Family: Roseobacteraceae
- Genus: Roseovarius
- Species: R. aestuariivivens

Binomial name
- Roseovarius aestuariivivens Park et al. 2017

Type strain
- KCTC 52454, NBRC 112420, strain GHTF-24

Species of bacterium

Roseovarius aestuariivivens is a Gram-negative, aerobic and non-motile bacterium from the genus Roseovarius which has been isolated from tidal flat sediments from the South Sea in Korea.
