= Roseovarius gaetbuli =

Scientific classification
- Domain: Bacteria
- Kingdom: Pseudomonadati
- Phylum: Pseudomonadota
- Class: Alphaproteobacteria
- Order: Rhodobacterales
- Family: Roseobacteraceae
- Genus: Roseovarius
- Species: R. gaetbuli

Binomial name
- Roseovarius gaetbuli Park et al. 2014

Type strain
- CECT 8370, KCTC 32428, YM-20

Species of bacterium

Roseovarius gaetbuli is a Gram-negative, aerobic and non-motile bacterium from the genus Roseovarius which has been isolated from tidal flat sediments from the Yellow Sea in Korea.
