= Roseovarius azorensis =

Scientific classification
- Domain: Bacteria
- Kingdom: Pseudomonadati
- Phylum: Pseudomonadota
- Class: Alphaproteobacteria
- Order: Rhodobacterales
- Family: Roseobacteraceae
- Genus: Roseovarius
- Species: R. azorensis

Binomial name
- Roseovarius azorensis Rajasabapathy et al. 2014

Type strain
- KCTC 32421, MTCC 11812, strain SSW084

Species of bacterium

Roseovarius azorensis is a Gram-negative, aerobic, non-spore-forming, rod-shaped and motile bacterium from the genus Roseovarius which has been isolated from seawater from Espalamaca from the Azores.
