= Roseovarius indicus =

Scientific classification
- Domain: Bacteria
- Kingdom: Pseudomonadati
- Phylum: Pseudomonadota
- Class: Alphaproteobacteria
- Order: Rhodobacterales
- Family: Roseobacteraceae
- Genus: Roseovarius
- Species: R. indicus

Binomial name
- Roseovarius indicus Lai et al. 2011

Type strain
- 2PR52-14, B108, CCTCC AB 208233, Lai B108, LMG 24622, MCCC 1A01227, strain 2PR52-14

Species of bacterium

Roseovarius indicus is a Gram-negative, rod-shaped and non-motile bacterium from the genus Roseovarius which has been isolated from deep sea-water from the Indian Ocean.
