= Roseovarius aestuarii =

Scientific classification
- Domain: Bacteria
- Kingdom: Pseudomonadati
- Phylum: Pseudomonadota
- Class: Alphaproteobacteria
- Order: Rhodobacterales
- Family: Roseobacteraceae
- Genus: Roseovarius
- Species: R. aestuarii

Binomial name
- Roseovarius aestuarii Yoon et al. 2008

Type strain
- CCUG 55325, KCTC 22174, strain SMK-122

Species of bacterium

Roseovarius aestuarii is a Gram-negative and motile bacterium from the genus Roseovarius which has been isolated from tidal flat sediments from the Yellow Sea in Korea.
