= Marivita cryptomonadis =

Scientific classification
- Domain: Bacteria
- Kingdom: Pseudomonadati
- Phylum: Pseudomonadota
- Class: Alphaproteobacteria
- Order: Rhodobacterales
- Family: Roseobacteraceae
- Genus: Marivita
- Species: M. cryptomonadis

Binomial name
- Marivita cryptomonadis Hwang et al. 2009

Type strain
- JCM 15447, KCCM 90070, CL-SK44

Species of bacterium

Marivita cryptomonadis is a Gram-negative, strictly aerobic and rod-shaped bacterium from the genus Marivita which has been isolated from the phytoplankton Cryptomonas from seawater in Korea.
