= Marivita geojedonensis =

Scientific classification
- Domain: Bacteria
- Kingdom: Pseudomonadati
- Phylum: Pseudomonadota
- Class: Alphaproteobacteria
- Order: Rhodobacterales
- Family: Roseobacteraceae
- Genus: Marivita
- Species: M. geojedonensis

Binomial name
- Marivita geojedonensis Yoon et al. 2013

Type strain
- CCUG 62112, KCTC 23882, strain DPG-138

Species of bacterium

Marivita geojedonensis is a Gram-negative, aerobic, rod-shaped, non-spore-forming and non-motile bacterium from the genus Marivita which has been isolated from seawater from the South Sea in Korea.
