= Pseudooceanicola atlanticus =

Scientific classification
- Domain: Bacteria
- Kingdom: Pseudomonadati
- Phylum: Pseudomonadota
- Class: Alphaproteobacteria
- Order: Rhodobacterales
- Family: Rhodobacteraceae
- Genus: Pseudomaribius
- Species: P. atlanticus

Binomial name
- Pseudomaribius atlanticus Lai et al. 2015

Type strain
- KCTC 42004, LMG 27424, MCCC 1A09160, 22II-S11g

Species of bacterium

Pseudooceanicola atlanticus is a Gram-negative and rod-shaped bacterium from the genus of Pseudooceanicola which has been isolated from seawater from the Atlantic Ocean.
