= Marivita hallyeonensis =

Scientific classification
- Domain: Bacteria
- Kingdom: Pseudomonadati
- Phylum: Pseudomonadota
- Class: Alphaproteobacteria
- Order: Rhodobacterales
- Family: Roseobacteraceae
- Genus: Marivita
- Species: M. hallyeonensis

Binomial name
- Marivita hallyeonensis Yoon et al. 2012

Type strain
- CCUG 60522, KCTC 23421, strain DPG-28

Species of bacterium

Marivita hallyeonensis is a Gram-negative, aerobic, rod-shaped, non-spore-forming and non-motile bacterium from the genus Marivita which has been isolated from seawater from Geoje-do in Korea.
