= Tropodithietic acid =

Tropolone derivative

- Chemical structure of tropodithietic acid

Names
- Preferred IUPAC name 3-Oxo-8,9-dithiabicyclo[5.2.0]nona-1,4,6-triene-2-carboxylic acid
- Other names TDA

Identifiers
CAS Number	750590-18-2
3D model (JSmol)	Interactive image
ChEBI	CHEBI:156455
ChemSpider	27025853
ECHA InfoCard	100.233.118
EC Number	806-061-7
PubChem CID	44632924
CompTox Dashboard (EPA)	DTXSID601336703
- InChI: InChI=1S/C8H4O3S2/c9-4-2-1-3-5-7(13-12-5)6(4)8(10)11/h1-3H,(H,10,11) Key: BLFCMITWMARUSM-UHFFFAOYSA-N
- SMILES: C1=CC(=O)C(=C2C(=C1)SS2)C(=O)O

Properties
Chemical formula	C_{8}H_{4}O_{3}S_{2}
Molar mass	212.24 g·mol^{−1}

Hazards
- GHS labelling
Pictograms	(GHS07: Exclamation mark)
Signal word	Warning
Hazard statements	H315, H319, H335
Precautionary statements	P261, P264, P271, P280, P302+P352, P304+P340, P305+P351+P338, P312, P321, P332+P313, P337+P313, P362, P403+P233, P405, P501
- Except where otherwise noted, data are given for materials in their standard state (at 25 °C [77 °F], 100 kPa). Infobox references

Tropodithietic acid is a tropolone derivative produced by the marine bacteria Phaeobacter piscinae, Phaeobacter inhibens and Phaeobacter gallaeciensis. Its structure is composed by a dithiete moiety fused to tropone-2-carboxylic acid.
