= Cognatiyoonia sediminum =

Scientific classification
- Domain: Bacteria
- Kingdom: Pseudomonadati
- Phylum: Pseudomonadota
- Class: Alphaproteobacteria
- Order: Rhodobacterales
- Family: Rhodobacteraceae
- Genus: Cognatiyoonia
- Species: C. sediminum

Binomial name
- Cognatiyoonia sediminum (Liang et al. 2015)Wirth and Whitman 2018

Type strain
- DSM 28715, MCCC 1K00257, strain S3B03

Synonyms
- Loktanella sediminum

Species of bacterium

Cognatiyoonia sediminum is a Gram-negative, strictly aerobic and short rod-shaped bacterium from the genus of Cognatiyoonia which has been isolated from marine sediments from the northern Okinawa Trough in China.
