= Marivita =

Scientific classification
- Domain: Bacteria
- Kingdom: Pseudomonadati
- Phylum: Pseudomonadota
- Class: Alphaproteobacteria
- Order: Rhodobacterales
- Family: Roseobacteraceae
- Genus: Marivita; Hwang et al. 2009

Type species
- Marivita cryptomonadi

Species
- Marivita byunsanensis Marivita cryptomonadis Marivita geojedonensis Marivita hallyeonensis Marivita lacus Marivita litorea

Synonyms
- Gaetbulicola

Genus of bacteria

Marivita is a genus of bacteria from the family Roseobacteraceae.
