= Litoreibacter arenae =

Limimaricola arenae

Scientific classification
- Domain: Bacteria
- Kingdom: Pseudomonadati
- Phylum: Pseudomonadota
- Class: Alphaproteobacteria
- Order: Rhodobacterales
- Family: Rhodobacteraceae
- Genus: Litoreibacter
- Species: L. arenae

Binomial name
- Litoreibacter arenae (Kim et al. 2009) Kim et al. 2012

Type strain
- DSM 19593, KACC 12675, NBRC 106423

Synonyms
- Thalassobacter arenae

Species of bacterium

Litoreibacter arenae is a Gram-negative, and short rod-shaped bacterium from the genus of Litoreibacter which has been isolated from sand from the Homi Cape in Korea.
