= Cribrihabitans pelagius =

Scientific classification
- Domain: Bacteria
- Kingdom: Pseudomonadati
- Phylum: Pseudomonadota
- Class: Alphaproteobacteria
- Order: Rhodobacterales
- Family: Rhodobacteraceae
- Genus: Cribrihabitans
- Species: C. pelagius

Binomial name
- Cribrihabitans pelagius Yoon et al. 2016

Type strain
- KCTC 42981, NBRC 111834, stran KMU-32

Species of bacterium

Cribrihabitans pelagius is a Gram-negative, strictly aerobic, chemoheterotrophic, rod-shaped and motile bacterium from the genus of Cribrihabitans which has been isolated from seawater from the beach of Najeong in Korea.
