= Litoreibacter meonggei =

Limimaricola meonggei

Scientific classification
- Domain: Bacteria
- Kingdom: Pseudomonadati
- Phylum: Pseudomonadota
- Class: Alphaproteobacteria
- Order: Rhodobacterales
- Family: Rhodobacteraceae
- Genus: Litoreibacter
- Species: L. meonggei

Binomial name
- Litoreibacter meonggei Kim et al. 2012

Type strain
- CCUG 61486, KCTC 23699, strain MA1-1

Species of bacterium

Litoreibacter meonggei is a Gram-negative and non-motile bacterium from the genus of Litoreibacter which has been isolated from the sea squirt Halocynthia roretzi from the South Sea in Korea.
