= Epibacterium mobile =

Scientific classification
- Domain: Bacteria
- Kingdom: Pseudomonadati
- Phylum: Pseudomonadota
- Class: Alphaproteobacteria
- Order: Rhodobacterales
- Family: Rhodobacteraceae
- Genus: Epibacterium
- Species: E. mobile

Binomial name
- Epibacterium mobile (Lee et al. 2007) Wirth and Whitman 2018

Type strain
- CIP 109181, KCCM 42378, NBRC 101030

Synonyms
- Ruegeria pelagia, Furvibacter pelagius Ruegeria mobilis

Species of bacterium

Epibacterium mobile is a bacterium from the genus of Epibacterium.
