= Pseudooceanicola batsensis =

Scientific classification
- Domain: Bacteria
- Kingdom: Pseudomonadati
- Phylum: Pseudomonadota
- Class: Alphaproteobacteria
- Order: Rhodobacterales
- Family: Rhodobacteraceae
- Genus: Pseudomaribius
- Species: P. batsensis

Binomial name
- Pseudomaribius batsensis ( Cho and Giovannoni 2004) Lai et al. 2015

Type strain
- ATCC BAA-863, DSM 15984, KCTC 12145

Synonyms
- Oceanicola batsensis

Species of bacterium

Pseudooceanicola batsensis is a Gram-negative, rod-shaped, chemoheterotrophic and non-motile bacterium from the genus of Pseudooceanicola which has been isolated from seawater from the Sargasso Sea.
