= Dimethylpropiothetin dethiomethylase =

dimethylpropiothetin dethiomethylase

Identifiers
- EC no.: 4.4.1.3
- CAS no.: 9026-85-1

Databases
- IntEnz: IntEnz view
- BRENDA: BRENDA entry
- ExPASy: NiceZyme view
- KEGG: KEGG entry
- MetaCyc: metabolic pathway
- PRIAM: profile
- PDB structures: RCSB PDB PDBe PDBsum
- Gene Ontology: AmiGO / QuickGO
Search
- PMC: articles
- PubMed: articles
- NCBI: proteins

The enzyme dimethylpropiothetin dethiomethylase (EC 4.4.1.3) catalyzes the chemical reaction

S,S-dimethyl-β-propiothetin $\rightleftharpoons$ dimethyl sulfide + acrylate

The enzyme breaks S,S-dimethyl-β-propiothetin into dimethyl sulfide and acrylate.

This enzyme belongs to the family of lyases, specifically the class of carbon-sulfur lyases. The systematic name of this enzyme class is S,S-dimethyl-β-propiothetin dimethyl-sulfide-lyase (acrylate-forming). Other names in common use include desulfhydrase, and S,S-dimethyl-beta-propiothetin dimethyl-sulfide-lyase.
