= Phaeobacter porticola =

Scientific classification
- Domain: Bacteria
- Kingdom: Pseudomonadati
- Phylum: Pseudomonadota
- Class: Alphaproteobacteria
- Order: Rhodobacterales
- Family: Rhodobacteraceae
- Genus: Phaeobacter
- Species: P. porticola

Binomial name
- Phaeobacter porticola Breider et al. 2017

Type strain
- DSM 103148, LMG 29594, P100, P104, P97

Species of bacterium

Phaeobacter porticola is a bacterium from the genus of Phaeobacter which has been isolated from barnacle from Neuharlingersiel in Germany.) Phaeobacter porticola produces antibiotics.
