= Roseovarius =

Scientific classification
- Domain: Bacteria
- Kingdom: Pseudomonadati
- Phylum: Pseudomonadota
- Class: Alphaproteobacteria
- Order: Rhodobacterales
- Family: Roseobacteraceae
- Genus: Roseovarius; Labrenz et al. 1999

Species
- R. aestuarii; R. aestuariivivens; R. albus; R. antarcticus; R. aquimarinus; R. atlanticus; R. azorensis; R. confluentis; R. gaetbuli; R. halotolerans; R. indicus; R. litoreus; R. lutimaris; R. marisflavi; R. mucosus; R. nanhaiticus; R. nubinhibens; R. pacificus; R. ramblicola; R. salinarum; R. scapharcae; R. tolerans

Synonyms
- Roseovarius Labrenz et al. 1999

Genus of bacteria

Roseovarius is a genus of bacteria in the family Roseobacteraceae.
