= Litoreibacter halocynthiae =

Limimaricola halocynthiae

Scientific classification
- Domain: Bacteria
- Kingdom: Pseudomonadati
- Phylum: Pseudomonadota
- Class: Alphaproteobacteria
- Order: Rhodobacterales
- Family: Rhodobacteraceae
- Genus: Litoreibacter
- Species: L. halocynthiae

Binomial name
- Litoreibacter halocynthiae Kim et al. 2013

Type strain
- CCUG 63416, KCTC 32213, P-MA1-7

Species of bacterium

Litoreibacter halocynthiae is a Gram-negative and non-motile bacterium from the genus of Litoreibacter which has been isolated from the sea squirt Halocynthia roretzi from the South Sea in Korea.
