= Donghicola eburneus =

Scientific classification
- Domain: Bacteria
- Kingdom: Pseudomonadati
- Phylum: Pseudomonadota
- Class: Alphaproteobacteria
- Order: Rhodobacterales
- Family: Rhodobacteraceae
- Genus: Donghicola
- Species: D. eburneus

Binomial name
- Donghicola eburneus Yoon et al. 2007

Type strain
- JCM 13604, KCTC 12735, strain SW-277

Species of bacterium

Donghicola eburneus is a bacterium from the genus of Donghicola which has been isolated from seawater from the Sea of Japan from Jeongdongjin in Korea.
