= Mary Ann Moran =

American bacteriologist

Academic background
- Education: University of Georgia; Cornell University; Colgate University

Academic work
- Discipline: Marine bacteria, carbon and sulfur cycling, genomics
- Institutions: University of Georgia

Mary Ann Moran is a distinguished research professor of marine sciences at the University of Georgia in Athens. She studies the role of bacteria in Earth's marine nutrient cycles, and is a leader in the fields of marine sciences and biogeochemistry. Her work is focused on how microbes interact with dissolved organic matter and the impact of microbial diversity on the global carbon and sulfur cycles. By defining the roles of diverse bacteria in the carbon and sulfur cycles, she connects the biogeochemical and organismal approaches in marine science.

For her leadership and contributions to science, Moran is a recipient of many awards and honors including a Creative Research Medal from the University of Georgia and the White Research and Mentoring Award from the American Society for Microbiology. She is also a Fellow of the American Academy of Microbiology and the American Association for the Advancement of Science. She was elected to the National Academy of Sciences in 2021.

== Education ==
Mary Ann Moran received her Bachelor of Arts degree in biology in 1977 at the Colgate University in Hamilton, New York. She went on to get her Masters of Science degree in Natural Resources in 1982 at Cornell University in Ithaca, New York.

Finally, she received her Ph.D. in the Graduate Program in Ecology in 1987 at the University of Georgia, in Athens, Georgia. She studied the variables affecting the biodegradation rates of lignocellulose in wetland ecosystems under Robert E. Hodson. After receiving her Ph.D. she stayed at the University of Georgia to pursue her research.

== Research and discoveries ==
Mary Ann Moran's research focuses on the role of bacteria in the marine carbon and sulfur cycles. In order to decipher the role of bacteria and better understand the diverse metabolisms occurring in the ocean, she uses ecological genomics, metagenomics and metatranscriptomics to study the genes and activity of marine bacteria in nature.

=== Carbon and sulfur cycle ===
As she progressed in her career, Moran's research focused on organic compounds and metabolic interactions that occur between dissolved organic matter and marine microbial communities. This field of science is what she remains studying to this day. Her major contributions have been in the research of dissolved organic matter (DOM) and the role of bacteria in marine biogeochemical cycles. She focuses mainly on the carbon and sulfur cycle.

- Organic matter is composed of carbon based compounds made by biological organisms. Organic matter can be found in soil, sediments, and water and is an important component of all ecosystems. It provides habitat, food and nutrients for organisms, controls nutrient exchange, aids in soil water retention, and can store significant amounts of carbon. Understanding the degradation of organic matter is critical to understanding the carbon cycle.
- Dissolved Organic Matter is dead forms of organic material, such as dead plant parts, that has degraded and dissolved to become a constituent of large or small bodies of water. Despite the importance of DOM in freshwater and marine ecosystems, the chemical make up is poorly understood.
- Biogeochemistry is the study of natural cycles such as the Carbon cycle and Sulfur cycle, which recycle vital elements of living matter.

As described in her 2015 Proceedings of the National Academy of Sciences paper, a large amount of organic matter is released by phytoplankton and then degraded by heterotrophic bacteria in the ocean surface. Compounds important for the trophic link are poorly known because there are thousands of chemicals making up marine DOM. One of the goals of Moran's research group is to predict how microbes and dissolved organic matter respond to our changing climate and how those responses, in turn, affect the global carbon cycle.

Since there are thousands of chemicals that make up marine DOM, the compounds are therefore, poorly known. Her research group grew two microorganisms together in the lab: a Roseobacter clade bacterium and a photosynthetic diatom. They used changes in gene expression to identify compounds made by the diatom that were then metabolized (eaten) by the bacterium. They identified that the diatom made large amounts of 2,3-dihydroxypropane-1-sulfonate (DHPS), a previously unknown diatom metabolite that was also specifically used by the bacterium as a food source. Moran's group also showed that DHPS was abundant in natural diatom populations and was an actively cycled compound in seawater. This research identified a missing component of the marine carbon and sulfur cycles and will most likely lead to a more detailed understanding of the marine carbon and sulfur cycle.

=== Roseobacter and clouds ===
Roseobacter species were first cultured in 1991 from the surface of marine algae. Using DNA and RNA sequencing methods developed by Moran for use in marine environments, Moran's research group demonstrated that a large portion of coastal and mixed-layer ocean bacterioplankton fall into the Roseobacter clade of Alphaproteobacteria. In addition, she has studied the physiology, genetics, and ecology of the Roseobacter clade extensively, firmly establishing their importance in many marine ecosystems.

Another major finding of her research is related to cloud formation. In order for a cloud to form, water must condense into droplets. Organic sulfur compounds in the atmosphere create aerosols that serve as cloud condensation nuclei. An organic sulfur compound known as DMSP (dimethylsulfoniopropionate) is produced in large quantities by photosynthetic plankton in ocean. If DMSP is converted to dimethyl sulfide (DMS), the DMS rises into the atmosphere and increases cloud formation. Moran's research group discovered key genes in Roseobacter and Pelagibacteria that breakdown DMSP into methanethiol instead, a chemical compound that does not enter the atmosphere or increase cloud formation. Basically, Moran's research group made a major discovery that explains connections between the marine microbial food web and cloud formation over the oceans. That research also helped in identifying the biochemical pathway that controls how bacteria release methanethiol into the microbial food web, making it available to other bacteria as well.

"Isolating and discovering a novel, keystone bacterium from the ocean first, and then sequencing its genome enabled this team to find the genes involved in the DMSP cycle," said Matthew Kane, program director in the National Science Foundation (NSF) Division of Molecular and Cellular Biosciences, which supported the research. "The research has revealed the previously hidden role that marine microbes play in the global sulfur cycle."

== Honors and scientific leadership ==
Moran received a Creative Research Medal from the University of Georgia for outstanding research focusing on a single theme in 1997. She was the Chair of the Microbial Ecology Division of the American Society for Microbiology from 2001 to 2002. In 2005, she was named a Distinguished Research Professor at the University of Georgia to recognize her contributions to her discipline and her research on Roseobacter species. She was elected to the American Academy of Microbiology in 2006. She served as a Gordon and Betty Moore Foundation Marine Microbiology Initiative Investigator from 2004 to 2012 for her work on the genomics of marine bacteria, and in 2016 she received a second award from this foundation to study the movement of carbon between marine microbes. She was the first to receive the White Research and Mentoring Award from the American Society for Microbiology in 2008 to recognize her commitment to mentoring and being a role model for young scientists at the undergraduate, graduate, and postdoctoral levels. To date, she has mentored eight graduate students, nine postdoctoral students, 25 undergraduate students, and five high school interns. Moran was also elected as a Fellow of the American Association for the Advancement of Science in 2009, and as a member of the National Academy of Sciences in 2021.

She is a member of multiple boards and committees, including the Scientific Advisory Board of the Max Planck Institute for Marine Microbiology since 2009, the Joint Genome Institute (JGI) Prokaryotic Super Program Advisory Committee since 2011, the JGI Scientific Advisory Committee since 2012, the Science Board of Reviewing Editors since 2015, and the American Academy of Microbiology Board of Governors since 2014.
