= Oceanicola =

Scientific classification
- Domain: Bacteria
- Kingdom: Pseudomonadati
- Phylum: Pseudomonadota
- Class: Alphaproteobacteria
- Order: Rhodobacterales
- Family: Rhodobacteraceae
- Genus: Oceanicola; Cho and Giovannoni 2004

Species
- Oceanicola batsensis; Oceanicola granulosus

Genus of bacteria

Oceanicola is a genus of bacteria in the family Rhodobacteraceae.
