= Tateyamaria pelophila =

Scientific classification
- Domain: Bacteria
- Kingdom: Pseudomonadati
- Phylum: Pseudomonadota
- Class: Alphaproteobacteria
- Order: Rhodobacterales
- Family: Rhodobacteraceae
- Genus: Tateyamaria
- Species: T. pelophila

Binomial name
- Tateyamaria pelophila Sass et al. 2010

Type strain
- DSM 17270, LMG 23018, SAM4

Species of bacterium

Tateyamaria pelophila is a Gram-negative, facultatively anaerobic and motile bacterium from the genus of Tateyamaria which has been isolated from tidal flat sediments from the North Sea Coast from Germany.
