= Loktanella =

Scientific classification
- Domain: Bacteria
- Kingdom: Pseudomonadati
- Phylum: Pseudomonadota
- Class: Alphaproteobacteria
- Order: Rhodobacterales
- Family: Rhodobacteraceae
- Genus: Loktanella; Van Trappen et al. 2004

Species
- Loktanella agnita; Loktanella atrilutea; Loktanella fryxellensis; Loktanella hongkongensis; Loktanella koreensis; Loktanella marincola; Loktanella rosea; Loktanella salsilacus; Loktanella tamlensis; Loktanella vestfoldensis

Synonyms
- Tanella

Genus of bacteria

Loktanella is a genus of bacteria in the family Rhodobacteraceae.
