= Roseobacter litoralis =

Scientific classification
- Domain: Bacteria
- Kingdom: Pseudomonadati
- Phylum: Pseudomonadota
- Class: Alphaproteobacteria
- Order: Rhodobacterales
- Family: Rhodobacteraceae
- Genus: Roseobacter
- Species: R. litoralis

Binomial name
- Roseobacter litoralis Shiba, 1991

Species of bacterium

Roseobacter litoralis is a species of aerobic pink-pigmented bacteria. Cells are ovoid or rod-shaped and motile by subpolar flagella. R. litoralis does not reduce nitrate, while R. dentrificans does. R. litoralis can be found in marine seaweed.
