= Litoreibacter janthinus =

Limimaricola janthinus

Scientific classification
- Domain: Bacteria
- Kingdom: Pseudomonadati
- Phylum: Pseudomonadota
- Class: Alphaproteobacteria
- Order: Rhodobacterales
- Family: Rhodobacteraceae
- Genus: Litoreibacter
- Species: L. janthinus

Binomial name
- Litoreibacter janthinus Romanenko et al. 2011

Type strain
- DSM 26921, JCM 16492, KMM 3842

Synonyms
- Litorea albida

Species of bacterium

Litoreibacter janthinus is a Gram-negative, strictly aerobic and non-motile bacterium from the genus of Litoreibacter which has been isolated from sediments from the Sea of Japan.
