= Cognatiyoonia =

Scientific classification
- Domain: Bacteria
- Kingdom: Pseudomonadati
- Phylum: Pseudomonadota
- Class: Alphaproteobacteria
- Order: Rhodobacterales
- Family: Rhodobacteraceae
- Genus: Cognatiyoonia; Wirth and Whitman 2018

Type species
- Cognatiyoonia koreensis

Species
- C. koreensis C. sediminum

Genus of bacteria

Cognatiyoonia is a genus of bacteria from the family of Rhodobacteraceae.
