= Ruegeria pomeroyi =

Scientific classification
- Domain: Bacteria
- Kingdom: Pseudomonadati
- Phylum: Pseudomonadota
- Class: Alphaproteobacteria
- Order: Rhodobacterales
- Family: Rhodobacteraceae
- Genus: Ruegeria
- Species: R. pomeroyi

Binomial name
- Ruegeria pomeroyi (González et al. 2003) Yi et al. 2007

Synonyms
- Silicibacter pomeroyi González et al. 2003

Species of bacterium

Ruegeria pomeroyi is a species of Gram-negative, rod-shaped, aerobic dimethylsulfoniopropionate-demethylating bacterium. Its type strain is DSS-3^{T} (=ATCC 700808^{T} =DSM 15171^{T}). Its genome has been sequenced.

== Discovery ==
Ruegeria pomeroyi was discovered off the coast of the Eastern United States in the laboratory of Mary Ann Moran, Ph.D. at the University of Georgia.

R. pomeroyi was named after Lawrence "Larry" Pomeroy, the marine microbial ecologist who notably established in 1974 that marine bacteria play a substantial and pivotal role in ocean food web dynamics. Pomeroy was also a researcher at the University of Georgia.

== Genome ==
The genome of the Ruegeria pomeroyi type strain (DSS-3) was completed in 2004. The genome is 4,109,442 base pairs long with a megaplasmid that is 491,611 base pairs long.

== Ecology ==
Ruegeria pomeroyi is a coastal ocean bacterium in a lineage of bacteria commonly considered ecological "generalists." The relatively large genome of R. pomeroyi, as compared to other marine bacterial species, supports this concept. In line with this, R. pomeroyi has a highly versatile ability to utilize and sequester carbon and energy.

R. pomeroyi also has the ability to degrade dimethylsulfoniopropionate (DMSP), a sulfur-containing algal osmolyte and use the sulfur to synthesize sulfur-containing amino acids. Although many marine bacteria are capable of degrading DMSP, the genes and proteins used to do so were elusive to researchers for many years. It was in R. pomeroyi that Howard and colleagues discovered the first gene that degrades DMSP. This gene (dmdA) codes for a protein (DmdA) that removes a methyl group (-CH3) from DMSP. The DmdA protein has since been further characterized from R. pomeroyi, as well as the transcriptional response of the dmdA gene to the presence of DMSP and the sequence diversity of the dmdA gene. This demethylation process is the first step in the highly sought-after demethylation pathway of DMSP degradation in marine bacteria. Following the discovery of the dmdA gene, the gene sequence was used to establish that over half of marine bacteria, including both open-ocean and coastal bacteria, are capable of demethylating DMSP.

Following the discovery of the demethylation pathway of DMSP degradation in R. pomeroyi, an alternative pathway of DMSP degradation was discovered in which DMSP is cleaved in half instead of demethylated, a process which R. pomeroyi also is capable.
