= Cribrihabitans neustonicus =

Scientific classification
- Domain: Bacteria
- Kingdom: Pseudomonadati
- Phylum: Pseudomonadota
- Class: Alphaproteobacteria
- Order: Rhodobacterales
- Family: Rhodobacteraceae
- Genus: Cribrihabitans
- Species: C. neustonicus

Binomial name
- Cribrihabitans neustonicus Hameed et al. 2014

Type strain
- BCRC 80695, JCM 19537, strain CC-AMHB-3

Species of bacterium

Cribrihabitans neustonicus is a Gram-negative, non-spore-forming, strictly aerobic and motile bacterium from the genus of Cribrihabitans which has been isolated from seawater from Hualien in Taiwan.
