= Cribrihabitans marinus =

Scientific classification
- Domain: Bacteria
- Kingdom: Pseudomonadati
- Phylum: Pseudomonadota
- Class: Alphaproteobacteria
- Order: Rhodobacterales
- Family: Rhodobacteraceae
- Genus: Cribrihabitans
- Species: C. marinus

Binomial name
- Cribrihabitans marinus Chen et al. 2014

Type strain
- CGMCC 1.13219, JCM 19401, strain CZ-AM5

Species of bacterium

Cribrihabitans marinus is a Gram-negative bacterium from the genus of Cribrihabitans which has been isolated from biofilm from a marine recirculating aquaculture system in Tianjin in China.
