= Tateyamaria =

Scientific classification
- Domain: Bacteria
- Kingdom: Pseudomonadati
- Phylum: Pseudomonadota
- Class: Alphaproteobacteria
- Order: Rhodobacterales
- Family: Roseobacteraceae
- Genus: Tateyamaria; Kurahashi and Yokota 2008

Type species
- Tateyamaria omphalii

Species
- T. omphalii T. pelophila

Synonyms
- Phycococcus

Genus of bacteria

Tateyamaria is a genus of bacteria from the family of Rhodobacteraceae.
