= Litoreibacter ascidiaceicola =

Limimaricola ascidiaceicola

Scientific classification
- Domain: Bacteria
- Kingdom: Pseudomonadati
- Phylum: Pseudomonadota
- Class: Alphaproteobacteria
- Order: Rhodobacterales
- Family: Rhodobacteraceae
- Genus: Litoreibacter
- Species: L. ascidiaceicola

Binomial name
- Litoreibacter ascidiaceicola Kim et al. 2014

Type strain
- CECT 8539, KCTC 42050, strain RSS4-C1

Species of bacterium

Litoreibacter ascidiaceicola is a Gram-negative, aerobic and non-motile bacterium from the genus of Litoreibacter which has been isolated from the sea squirt Halocynthia aurantium from Namhae in Korea.
