= Litoreibacter ponti =

Limimaricola ponti

Scientific classification
- Domain: Bacteria
- Kingdom: Pseudomonadati
- Phylum: Pseudomonadota
- Class: Alphaproteobacteria
- Order: Rhodobacterales
- Family: Rhodobacteraceae
- Genus: Litoreibacter
- Species: L. ponti

Binomial name
- Litoreibacter ponti Park et al. 2014

Type strain
- KCTC 42114, NBRC 110379, strain GJSW-31

Species of bacterium

Litoreibacter ponti is a Gram-negative, aerobic and non-motile bacterium from the genus of Litoreibacter which has been isolated from seawater from the Geoje Island in Korea.
