= Tateyamaria omphalii =

Scientific classification
- Domain: Bacteria
- Kingdom: Pseudomonadati
- Phylum: Pseudomonadota
- Class: Alphaproteobacteria
- Order: Rhodobacterales
- Family: Rhodobacteraceae
- Genus: Tateyamaria
- Species: T. omphalii

Binomial name
- Tateyamaria omphalii Kurahashi and Yokota 2008

Type strain
- IAM 15108, JCM 21569, KCTC 12333

Species of bacterium

Tateyamaria omphalii is a Gram-negative and strictly aerobic bacterium from the genus of Tateyamaria which has been isolated from the shell of the sea snail Omphalius pfeifferi pfeifferi from Japan.
