= Sagittula stellata =

Scientific classification
- Domain: Bacteria
- Kingdom: Pseudomonadati
- Phylum: Pseudomonadota
- Class: Alphaproteobacteria
- Order: Rhodobacterales
- Family: Rhodobacteraceae
- Genus: Sagittula
- Species: S. stellata

Binomial name
- Sagittula stellata Gonzalez et al. 1997

Species of bacterium

Sagittula stellata is a lignin-transforming bacterium, the type species of its genus. It is Gram-negative and rod-shaped, does not form spores, and is strictly aerobic. The type strain is E-37 (= ATCC 700073).
