= Epibacterium scottomollicae =

Scientific classification
- Domain: Bacteria
- Kingdom: Pseudomonadati
- Phylum: Pseudomonadota
- Class: Alphaproteobacteria
- Order: Rhodobacterales
- Family: Rhodobacteraceae
- Genus: Epibacterium
- Species: E. scottomollicae

Binomial name
- Epibacterium scottomollicae (Vandecandelaere et al. 2008)Wirth and Whitman 2018

Type strain
- CCUG 55858, LMG 24367

Synonyms
- Ruegeria scottomollicae

Species of bacterium

Epibacterium scottomollicae is a bacterium from the genus of Epibacterium which has been isolated from marine biofilm from Genoa in Italy.
