= Epibacterium multivorans =

Scientific classification
- Domain: Bacteria
- Kingdom: Pseudomonadati
- Phylum: Pseudomonadota
- Class: Alphaproteobacteria
- Order: Rhodobacterales
- Family: Rhodobacteraceae
- Genus: Epibacterium
- Species: E. multivorans

Binomial name
- Epibacterium multivorans (Lucena et al. 2012)Wirth and Whitman 2018

Type strain
- CECT 7557, KCTC 23350

Synonyms
- Tropicibacter multivorans

Species of bacterium

Epibacterium multivorans is an aerobic bacteria bacterium from the genus of Epibacterium which has been isolated from seawater from the beach of Malvarrosa in Spain.
