= Donghicola tyrosinivorans =

Scientific classification
- Domain: Bacteria
- Kingdom: Pseudomonadati
- Phylum: Pseudomonadota
- Class: Alphaproteobacteria
- Order: Rhodobacterales
- Family: Rhodobacteraceae
- Genus: Donghicola
- Species: D. tyrosinivorans

Binomial name
- Donghicola tyrosinivorans Sung et al. 2015

Type strain
- DSM 100212, KCTC 42571, strain 13-93-B1

Species of bacterium

Donghicola tyrosinivorans is a Gram-negative, tyrosine-degrading, aerobic and non-motile bacterium from the genus of Donghicola which has been isolated from seawater from the Jeju Island in Korea.
