= Sulfitobacter brevis =

Scientific classification
- Domain: Bacteria
- Kingdom: Pseudomonadati
- Phylum: Pseudomonadota
- Class: Alphaproteobacteria
- Order: Rhodobacterales
- Family: Rhodobacteraceae
- Genus: Sulfitobacter
- Species: S. brevis

Binomial name
- Sulfitobacter brevis Labrenz et al. 2000

Species of bacterium

Sulfitobacter brevis is a species of bacteria isolated from the hypersaline, heliothermal and meromictic Antarctic Ekho Lake. It is Gram-negative, aerobic, pointed and budding, with type strain EL-162T (= DSM 11443T).
