= Ketogulonicigenium =

Scientific classification
- Domain: Bacteria
- Kingdom: Pseudomonadati
- Phylum: Pseudomonadota
- Class: Alphaproteobacteria
- Order: Rhodobacterales
- Family: Rhodobacteraceae
- Genus: Ketogulonicigenium corrig. Urbance et al. 2001

Species
- "Ketogulonicigenium robustum" corrig. Urbance et al. 2001; "Ketogulonicigenium vulgare" corrig. Urbance et al. 2001

Synonyms
- Ketogulonigenium Urbance et al. 2001

Genus of bacteria

"Ketogulonicigenium" is a genus of bacteria in the family Rhodobacteraceae.
