= Sulfitobacter =

Scientific classification
- Domain: Bacteria
- Kingdom: Pseudomonadati
- Phylum: Pseudomonadota
- Class: Alphaproteobacteria
- Order: Rhodobacterales
- Family: Rhodobacteraceae
- Genus: Sulfitobacter; Sorokin 1996 emend. Yoon et al. 2007

Species
- See text

Synonyms
- Oceanibulbus Wagner-Döbler et al. 2004; Staleya Labrenz et al. 2000

Genus of bacteria

Sulfitobacter is a genus of bacteria in the family the Rhodobacteraceae.

== Species ==
Sulfitobacter comprises the following species:

- Sulfitobacter aestuarii Park et al. 2018
- "Sulfitobacter algicola" Wang et al. 2021
- Sulfitobacter brevis Labrenz et al. 2000
- Sulfitobacter delicatus Ivanova et al. 2004
- Sulfitobacter donghicola Yoon et al. 2007
- Sulfitobacter dubius Ivanova et al. 2004
- Sulfitobacter faviae Kumari et al. 2016
- Sulfitobacter geojensis Kwak et al. 2014
- Sulfitobacter guttiformis (Labrenz et al. 2000) Yoon et al. 2007
- Sulfitobacter indolifex (Wagner-Döbler et al. 2004) Liu et al. 2017
- Sulfitobacter litoralis Park et al. 2007
- Sulfitobacter marinus Yoon et al. 2007
- Sulfitobacter maritimus Lian et al. 2021
- Sulfitobacter mediterraneus Pukall et al. 1999
- Sulfitobacter noctilucae Kwak et al. 2014
- Sulfitobacter noctilucicola Kwak et al. 2014
- Sulfitobacter pacificus Fukui et al. 2015
- Sulfitobacter pontiacus Sorokin 1996
- Sulfitobacter porphyrae Fukui et al. 2014
- Sulfitobacter profundi Song et al. 2020
- Sulfitobacter pseudonitzschiae Hong et al. 2015
- Sulfitobacter sabulilitoris Park et al. 2019
- Sulfitobacter salinus Yoon 2020
- "Sulfitobacter sediminilitoris" Park et al. 2020
- Sulfitobacter undariae Park et al. 2015
