= Cribrihabitans =

Scientific classification
- Domain: Bacteria
- Kingdom: Pseudomonadati
- Phylum: Pseudomonadota
- Class: Alphaproteobacteria
- Order: Rhodobacterales
- Family: Rhodobacteraceae
- Genus: Cribrihabitans; Chen et al. 2014

Type species
- Cribrihabitans marinus

Species
- C. marinus C. neustonicus C. pelagius

Genus of bacteria

Cribrihabitans is a genus of bacteria from the family of Rhodobacteraceae.
