= Salipiger =

Scientific classification
- Domain: Bacteria
- Kingdom: Pseudomonadati
- Phylum: Pseudomonadota
- Class: Alphaproteobacteria
- Order: Rhodobacterales
- Family: Rhodobacteraceae
- Genus: Salipiger; Martínez-Cánovas et al. 2004

Species
- Salipiger aestuarii (Park et al. 2011) Wirth and Whitman 2018; Salipiger bermudensis (Cho and Giovannoni 2006) Wirth and Whitman 2018; Salipiger manganoxidans (Rajasabapathy et al. 2016) Wirth and Whitman 2018; Salipiger marinus (Lai et al. 2011) Wirth and Whitman 2018; Salipiger mucosus corrig. Martínez-Cánovas et al. 2004; Salipiger pacificus (Dai et al. 2006) Hördt et al. 2020; Salipiger profundus (Li et al. 2015) Wirth and Whitman 2018; Salipiger thiooxidans (Sorokin et al. 2006) Wirth and Whitman 2018

Synonyms
- Citreicella Sorokin et al. 2006; Pelagibaca Cho and Giovannoni 2006; Thiobacimonas Li et al. 2015; Yangia Dai et al. 2006

Genus of bacteria

Salipiger is a genus of bacteria in the family Rhodobacteraceae.
