= Ruegeria =

Scientific classification
- Domain: Bacteria
- Kingdom: Pseudomonadati
- Phylum: Pseudomonadota
- Class: Alphaproteobacteria
- Order: Rhodobacterales
- Family: Rhodobacteraceae
- Genus: Ruegeria; Uchino et al. 1999

Type species
- Ruegeria atlantica (Rüger and Höfle 1992) Uchino et al. 1999

Species
- Ruegeria arenilitoris Park and Yoon 2013; Ruegeria atlantica (Rüger and Höfle 1992) Uchino et al. 1999; Ruegeria conchae Lee et al. 2012; Ruegeria denitrificans Arahal et al. 2018; Ruegeria faecimaris Oh et al. 2011; "Ruegeria haliotis" Cao et al. 2021; Ruegeria halocynthiae Kim et al. 2012; Ruegeria intermedia Kämpfer et al. 2013; Ruegeria lacuscaerulensis (Petursdottir and Kristjansson 1999) Yi et al. 2007; Ruegeria litorea (Lucena et al. 2014) Wirth and Whitman 2018; Ruegeria marina Huo et al. 2011; Ruegeria marisrubri Zhang et al. 2017; Ruegeria mediterranea (Lucena et al. 2014) Wirth and Whitman 2018; Ruegeria meonggei Kim et al. 2014; Ruegeria meteori (Rüger and Höfle 1992) Hördt et al. 2020; Ruegeria pomeroyi (González et al. 2003) Yi et al. 2007; Ruegeria profundi Zhang et al. 2017; Ruegeria sediminis Baek et al. 2020

Synonyms
- Silicibacter Petursdottir and Kristjansson 1999

Genus of bacteria

Ruegeria is a genus of bacteria in the family Rhodobacteraceae. This genus was formerly known as the marine Agrobacterium before they were reclassified in 1998. It bears in fact the name of Hans-Jürgen Rüger, a German microbiologist, for his contribution to the taxonomy of marine species of Agrobacterium.

== Characteristics ==
The genus is characterised by members who are:

- Gram-negative (like all Proteobacteria)
- ovoid to rod-shaped cells 0.6–1.6 × 1.0–4.0 μm
- motile by polar flagella, or nonmotile
- non-sporeformers
- aerobic
- oxidase and catalase positive
- are incapable of photosynthetic growth
- bacteriochlorophyll a is absent
- major quinone is ubiquinone 10
- mol% G+C of the DNA is 55–59
- member of the family Rhodobacteraceae, which is phenotypically, metabolically, ecologically diverse and defined based on 16S sequences data

Phylogenetically it is very close to the genus Silicibacter, but the two remain separate species due to phenotypic differences — two species for which this is problematic are Ruegeria lacuscaerulensis and Ruegeria pomeroyi.

Two species that have been removed from the genus are Marinovum algicola (Ruegeria algicola) and Thalassobius gelatinovorus (Ruegeria gelatinovora).^{[and refs therein]}

== Small non-coding RNAs ==
Highly abundant bacterial small RNAs have been shown to be present in the bacteria subjected to chronic nutrient limitation. In Ruegeria pomeroyi RNAseq analysis identified 99 putative sRNAs. The bacterial sRNAs regulatory mechanisms are typically based on direct RNA-RNA interaction with a target mRNA. The target gene groups identified by Rivers et al. were genes involved in transport, genes mediating cell-cell interactions, signal transduction and transcriptional regulation.
