= Brevirhabdus =

Scientific classification
- Domain: Bacteria
- Kingdom: Pseudomonadati
- Phylum: Pseudomonadota
- Class: Alphaproteobacteria
- Order: Rhodobacterales
- Family: Rhodobacteraceae
- Genus: Brevirhabdus; Wu et al., 2015
- Species: B. pacifica

Binomial name
- Brevirhabdus pacifica Wu et al., 2015

Synonyms
- Species synonymy: Xuhuaishuia manganoxidans Wang et al., 2016

Genus of bacteria

Brevirhabdus is a Gram-negative and aerobic genus of bacteria from the family of Rhodobacteraceae with one known species, Brevirhabdus pacifica. B. pacifica has been isolated from deep-sea sediments from a hydrothermal vent field from the East Pacific Rise
