= Epibacterium =

Scientific classification
- Domain: Bacteria
- Kingdom: Pseudomonadati
- Phylum: Pseudomonadota
- Class: Alphaproteobacteria
- Order: Rhodobacterales
- Family: Rhodobacteraceae
- Genus: Epibacterium; Penesyan et al. 2013

Type species
- Epibacterium ulvae

Species
- E. mobile E. multivorans E. scottomollicae E. ulvae

Genus of bacteria

Epibacterium is a genus of bacteria from the family of Rhodobacteraceae.
