= Litoreibacter =

Scientific classification
- Domain: Bacteria
- Kingdom: Pseudomonadati
- Phylum: Pseudomonadota
- Class: Alphaproteobacteria
- Order: Rhodobacterales
- Family: Rhodobacteraceae
- Genus: Litoreibacter; Romanenko et al. 2011

Type species
- Litoreibacter albidus

Species
- L. albidus L. arenae L. ascidiaceicola L. halocynthiae L. janthinus L. meonggei L. ponti

Genus of bacteria

Litoreibacter is a genus of bacteria from the family of Rhodobacteraceae.
