= Phaeobacter gallaeciensis =

Scientific classification
- Domain: Bacteria
- Kingdom: Pseudomonadati
- Phylum: Pseudomonadota
- Class: Alphaproteobacteria
- Order: Rhodobacterales
- Family: Rhodobacteraceae
- Genus: Phaeobacter
- Species: P. gallaeciensis

Binomial name
- Phaeobacter gallaeciensis (Ruiz-Ponte et al. 1998) Martens et al. 2006

Species of bacterium

Phaeobacter gallaeciensis belongs to the roseobacter clade of α-Proteobacteria
