= Tripartite ATP-independent periplasmic transporter =

Family of proteins

DctP component of Tripartite ATP-independent periplasmic transporter

Identifiers
- Symbol: DctP
- Pfam: PF03480
- Pfam clan: CL0177
- InterPro: IPR018389
- TCDB: 2.A.56
Available protein structures:
- PDB: IPR018389 PF03480 (ECOD; PDBsum)
- AlphaFold: IPR018389; PF03480

DctQ component of Tripartite ATP-independent periplasmic transporter

Identifiers
- Symbol: DctQ
- Pfam: PF04290
- InterPro: IPR007387
- TCDB: 2.A.56
Available protein structures:
- PDB: IPR007387 PF04290 (ECOD; PDBsum)
- AlphaFold: IPR007387; PF04290

DctM-like transporters

Identifiers
- Symbol: DctM
- Pfam: PF06808
- Pfam clan: CL0182
- InterPro: IPR010656
- TCDB: 2.A.56
Available protein structures:
- PDB: IPR010656 PF06808 (ECOD; PDBsum)
- AlphaFold: IPR010656; PF06808

Tripartite ATP-independent periplasmic transporters (TRAP transporters) are a large family of solute transporters found in bacteria and archaea, but not in eukaryotes, that appear to be specific for the uptake of organic acids or related molecules containing a carboxylate or sulfonate group. They are unique in that they utilize a substrate binding protein (SBP) in combination with a secondary transporter.

== History ==
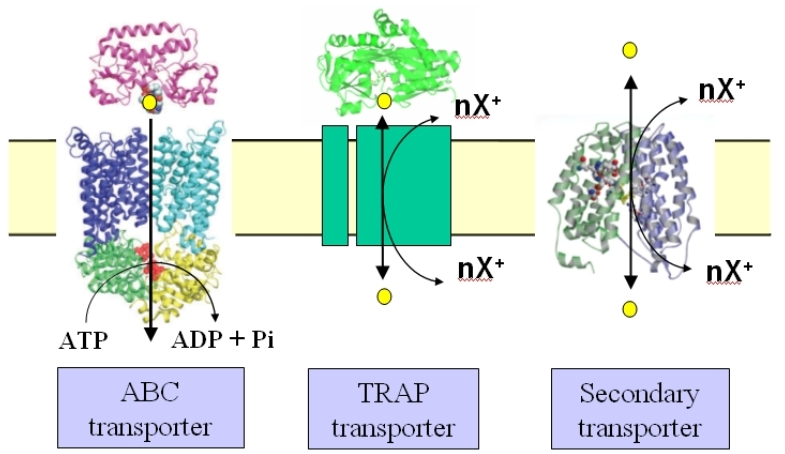
A schematic illustrating the key features of a TRAP transporter in comparison to an ABC transporter and a classical secondary transporter.

TRAP transporters were discovered in the laboratory of Prof. David J. Kelly at the University of Sheffield, England. His group were working on the mechanism used by the photosynthetic bacterium Rhodobacter capsulatus to take up certain dicarboxylic acids. They characterised a binding protein component (DctP) of a transporter that recognized these compounds, which they assumed would form part of a typical ABC transporter, but when they sequenced the genes surrounding dctP they found two other genes encoding integral membrane proteins, dctQ and dctM, but no genes encoding components of an ABC transporter. They further showed that uptake of the same dicarboxylates was independent of ATP and that uptake required an electrochemical ion gradient, making this a unique binding protein-dependent secondary transporter.

Since these early studies, it has become clear that TRAP transporters are present in many bacteria and archaea, with many bacterial having multiple TRAP transporters, some having over 20 different systems.

== Substrates ==
To date, most substrates for TRAP transporters contain a common feature which is that they are organic acids. This includes C4-dicarboxylates such as succinate, malate and fumarate, keto-acids such as pyruvate and alpha-ketobutyrate and the sugar acid, N-acetyl neuraminic acid (or sialic acid). Other substrates include the compatible solute ectoine and hydroxyectoine and pyroglutamate.

== Composition ==
All known TRAP transporters contain 3 protein domains. These are the solute binding protein (the SBP), the small membrane protein domain and the large membrane protein domain. Following the nomenclature for the first characterized TRAP transporter, DctPQM, these subunits are usually named P, Q and M respectively. Around 10% of TRAP transporters have natural genetic fusions between the two membrane protein components, and in the one well studied example of this in the sialic acid specific TRAP transporter from Haemophilus influenzae the fused gene has been named siaQM.

== Mechanism ==
By using an SBP, TRAP transporters share some similarity to ABC transporters in that the substrate for the transporter is initially recognized outside of the cytoplasmic membrane. In Gram-negative bacteria, the SBP is usually free in the periplasm and expressed at relatively high levels compared to the membrane domains. In Gram positive bacteria and archaea, the SBP is tethered to the cytoplasmic membrane. In both types of systems the SBP binds to substrate, usually with low micromolar affinity, which causes a significant conformation change in the protein, akin to a Venus flytrap closing. The trapped substrate is then delivered to the membrane domains of the transporter, where the electrochemical ion gradient is somehow exploited to open the SBP, extract the substrate and catalyse its movement across the membrane. For the SiaPQM TRAP transporter which has been studied in a fully reconstituted in vitro form, uptake uses a Na^{+} gradient and not proton gradient to drive uptake. The SiaPQM systems also exhibits unique properties for a secondary transporter in that it cannot catalyse bidirectional transport as the SBP imposes that movement is only in the direction of uptake into the cell.

== Structure ==
=== Substrate binding protein (SBP) ===
Following the first structure of a TRAP SBP in 2005, there are now over 10 different structures available. They all have very similar overall structures, with two globular domains linked by a hinge. The substrate binding site is formed by both the domains which enclose the substrate. A highly conserved arginine residue in the TRAP SBPs forms a salt bridge with a carboxylate group on the substrate, which is important for substrate recognition.

=== Membrane subunits ===
The first structures of the membrane subunits were determined for the fused sialic acid transporter from Haemophilus influenzae and the non-fused sialic acid transporter from Photobacterium profundum. The structures support an elevator-like mechanism of transport. While the larger M-subunit forms the elevator or transport domain, the Q-subunit extends the scaffold domain of the transporter. The location of the substrate-binding site within the transport domain was confirmed by structures of SiaQM from Fusobacterium nucleatum and the isethionate transporter IseQM from Oleidesulfovibrio alaskensis. These structures were all determined as monomers, although the H. influenzae system has been shown to form dimers via the scaffold domain. Current models suggest binding of the SBP with both functional parts of the transporter, the scaffold and the elevator domain, and show a matched conformational coupling between the inward-facing and outward-facing states of the membrane subunits to the opened and closed states of the SBP.
