= Phaeobacter =

Scientific classification
- Domain: Bacteria
- Kingdom: Pseudomonadati
- Phylum: Pseudomonadota
- Class: Alphaproteobacteria
- Order: Rhodobacterales
- Family: Rhodobacteraceae
- Genus: Phaeobacter; Martens et al. 2006

Species
- Phaeobacter gallaeciensis (Ruiz-Ponte et al. 1998) Martens et al. 2006; Phaeobacter inhibens Martens et al. 2006; Phaeobacter italicus (Vandecandelaere et al. 2009) Wirth and Whitman 2018; "Phaeobacter marinintestinus" Lee et al. 2015; Phaeobacter piscinae Sonnenschein et al. 2017; Phaeobacter porticola Breider et al. 2017

Synonyms
- Nautella Vandecandelaere et al. 2009

Genus of bacteria

Phaeobacter is a genus of bacteria in the family Rhodobacteraceae.
