= Albibacillus =

Scientific classification
- Domain: Bacteria
- Kingdom: Pseudomonadati
- Phylum: Pseudomonadota
- Class: Alphaproteobacteria
- Order: Rhodobacterales
- Family: Rhodobacteraceae
- Genus: Albibacillus; Hördt et al. 2020

Type species
- Albibacillus kandeliae

Species
- A. kandeliae

Genus of bacteria

Albibacillus is a gram-negative, rod-shaped and motile bacterial genus from the family Rhodobacteraceae with one known species (Albibacillus kandeliae). Ruegeria kandeliae has been reclassified to Albibacillus kandeliae.
