= Phaeobacter piscinae =

Scientific classification
- Domain: Bacteria
- Kingdom: Pseudomonadati
- Phylum: Pseudomonadota
- Class: Alphaproteobacteria
- Order: Rhodobacterales
- Family: Rhodobacteraceae
- Genus: Phaeobacter
- Species: P. piscinae

Binomial name
- Phaeobacter piscinae Sonnenschein et al. 2017

Type strain
- DSM 103509, LMG 29708, P13, P14

Species of bacterium

Phaeobacter piscinae is a heterotrophic, antimicrobial and motile bacteria from the genus of Phaeobacter. Phaeobacter piscinae produces tropodithietic acid.
