= Cognatiyoonia koreensis =

Scientific classification
- Domain: Bacteria
- Kingdom: Pseudomonadati
- Phylum: Pseudomonadota
- Class: Alphaproteobacteria
- Order: Rhodobacterales
- Family: Rhodobacteraceae
- Genus: Cognatiyoonia
- Species: C. koreensis

Binomial name
- Cognatiyoonia koreensis (Weon et al. 2006)Wirth and Whitman 2018

Type strain
- DSM 17925, KACC 11519, strain GA2-M3

Synonyms
- Loktanella koreensis

Species of bacterium

Cognatiyoonia koreensis is a Gram-negative, non-spore-forming and non-motile bacterium from the genus of Cognatiyoonia which has been isolated from sea sand from the Homi cape in Pohang in Korea.
