= Epibacterium ulvae =

Scientific classification
- Domain: Bacteria
- Kingdom: Pseudomonadati
- Phylum: Pseudomonadota
- Class: Alphaproteobacteria
- Order: Rhodobacterales
- Family: Rhodobacteraceae
- Genus: Epibacterium
- Species: E. ulvae

Binomial name
- Epibacterium ulvae Penesyan et al. 2013

Type strain
- DSM 24752, Egan U95, LMG 26464

Species of bacterium

Epibacterium ulvae is a Gram-negative, rod-shaped and motile bacterium from the genus of Epibacterium. It has been isolated from the alga Ulva australis from Clovelly in Australia.
