= Youngimonas =

Scientific classification
- Domain: Bacteria
- Kingdom: Pseudomonadati
- Phylum: Pseudomonadota
- Class: Alphaproteobacteria
- Order: Rhodobacterales
- Family: Rhodobacteraceae
- Genus: Youngimonas; Hameed et al. 2014

Type species
- Youngimonas vesicularis

Species
- Y. vesicularis

Genus of bacteria

Youngimonas is a Gram-negative, strictly aerobic, rod-shaped, non-spore-forming and non-motile genus of bacteria from the family of Rhodobacteraceae with one known species (Youngimonas vesicularis). Youngimonas vesicularis has been isolated from seawater from the coast of Kending in Taiwan.
