= Roseobacter denitrificans =

Scientific classification
- Domain: Bacteria
- Kingdom: Pseudomonadati
- Phylum: Pseudomonadota
- Class: Alphaproteobacteria
- Order: Rhodobacterales
- Family: Rhodobacteraceae
- Genus: Roseobacter
- Species: R. denitrificans

Binomial name
- Roseobacter denitrificans Shiba, 1991

Species of bacterium

Roseobacter denitrificans is a species of aerobic pink-pigmented bacteria. It contains Bacteriochlorophyll a. It contains spheroidenone, does not synthesize bacteriochlorophyll anaerobically, but shows aerobic phototrophic activity. Cells are ovoid or rod-shaped and motile by subpolar flagella. R. litoralis does not reduce nitrate, while R. denitrificans does.
