= Hasllibacter =

Scientific classification
- Domain: Bacteria
- Kingdom: Pseudomonadati
- Phylum: Pseudomonadota
- Class: Alphaproteobacteria
- Order: Rhodobacterales
- Family: Rhodobacteraceae
- Genus: Hasllibacter; Kim et al. 2012

Type species
- Hasllibacter halocynthiae

Species
- H. halocynthiae

Genus of bacteria

Hasllibacter is a Gram-negative and aerobic genus of bacteria from the family of Rhodobacteraceae with one known species (Hasllibacter halocynthiae). Hasllibacter halocynthiae has been isolated from a Sea pineapple from Gangneung in Korea.
