= Donghicola =

Scientific classification
- Domain: Bacteria
- Kingdom: Pseudomonadati
- Phylum: Pseudomonadota
- Class: Alphaproteobacteria
- Order: Rhodobacterales
- Family: Rhodobacteraceae
- Genus: Donghicola; Yoon et al. 2007

Type species
- Donghicola eburneus

Species
- D. eburneus D. tyrosinivorans

Synonyms
- Orientalimare

Genus of bacteria

Donghicola is a genus of bacteria from the family of Rhodobacteraceae.
