= Salinihabitans =

Scientific classification
- Domain: Bacteria
- Kingdom: Pseudomonadati
- Phylum: Pseudomonadota
- Class: Alphaproteobacteria
- Order: Rhodobacterales
- Family: Rhodobacteraceae
- Genus: Salinihabitans; Yoon et al. 2009

Type species
- Salinihabitans flavidus

Species
- S. flavidus

Genus of bacteria

Salinihabitans is a Gram-negative, rod-shaped and non-motile genus of bacteria from the family of Rhodobacteraceae with one known species (Salinihabitans flavidus). Salinihabitans flavidus has been isolated from a marine solar saltern from Korea.
