= Litoreibacter albidus =

Limimaricola albidus

Scientific classification
- Domain: Bacteria
- Kingdom: Pseudomonadati
- Phylum: Pseudomonadota
- Class: Alphaproteobacteria
- Order: Rhodobacterales
- Family: Rhodobacteraceae
- Genus: Litoreibacter
- Species: L. albidus

Binomial name
- Litoreibacter albidus Romanenko et al. 2011

Type strain
- DSM 26922, JCM 16493, KMM 3851

Synonyms
- Litorea janthina

Species of bacterium

Litoreibacter albidus is a Gram-negative, strictly aerobic and non-motile bacterium from the genus of Litoreibacter which has been isolated from the sea snail Umbonium costatum from the Sea of Japan.
