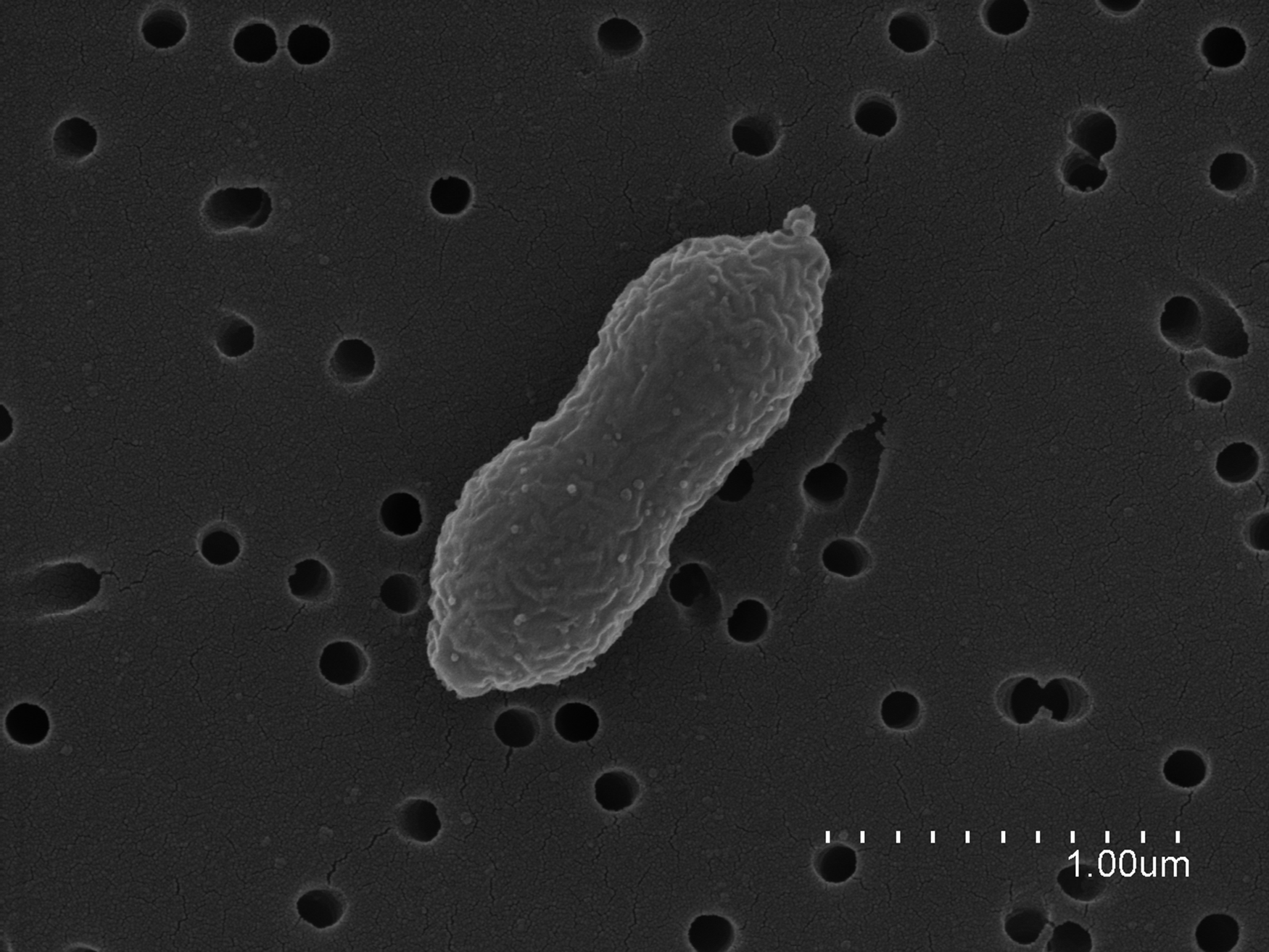
- Image of Sagittula salina

Scientific classification
- Domain: Bacteria
- Kingdom: Pseudomonadati
- Phylum: Pseudomonadota
- Class: Alphaproteobacteria
- Order: Rhodobacterales
- Family: Rhodobacteraceae
- Genus: Sagittula; Gonzalez et al. 1997

Species
- Sagittula marina; Sagittula stellata

= Sagittula =

Genus of bacteria

Sagittula is a genus of bacteria in the family Rhodobacteraceae.
