= Octadecabacter =

Scientific classification
- Domain: Bacteria
- Kingdom: Pseudomonadati
- Phylum: Pseudomonadota
- Class: Alphaproteobacteria
- Order: Rhodobacterales
- Family: Rhodobacteraceae
- Genus: Octadecabacter; Gosink et al. 1998

Species
- Octadecabacter antarcticus Gosink et al. 1998; Octadecabacter arcticus Gosink et al. 1998; Octadecabacter ascidiaceicola Kim et al. 2016; Octadecabacter ponticola Park et al. 2016; Octadecabacter temperatus Billerbeck et al. 2015

Genus of bacteria

Octadecabacter is a genus of bacteria in the family Rhodobacteraceae.
