= Aquicoccus =

Scientific classification
- Domain: Bacteria
- Kingdom: Pseudomonadati
- Phylum: Pseudomonadota
- Class: Alphaproteobacteria
- Order: Rhodobacterales
- Family: Rhodobacteraceae
- Genus: Aquicoccus; Feng et al. 2018

Type species
- Aquicoccus porphyridii

Species
- A. porphyridii

Genus of bacteria

Aquicoccus is a Gram-negative and aerobic genus of bacteria from the family of Rhodobacteraceae with one known species (Aquicoccus porphyridii). Aquicoccus porphyridii has been isolated from the alga Porphyridium marinum from Korea.
