= Marimonas =

Scientific classification
- Domain: Bacteria
- Kingdom: Pseudomonadati
- Phylum: Pseudomonadota
- Class: Alphaproteobacteria
- Order: Rhodobacterales
- Family: Rhodobacteraceae
- Genus: Marimonas; Thongphrom et al. 2017

Type species
- Marimonas arenosa

Species
- M. arenosa; M. lutisalis

Genus of bacteria

Marimonas is a Gram-negative and aerobic genus of bacteria from the family of Rhodobacteraceae with two known species: Marimonas arenosa et Marimonas lutisalis. Marimonas arenosa has been isolated from sea sand from Korea.
