= Phaeobacter inhibens =

Scientific classification
- Domain: Bacteria
- Kingdom: Pseudomonadati
- Phylum: Pseudomonadota
- Class: Alphaproteobacteria
- Order: Rhodobacterales
- Family: Rhodobacteraceae
- Genus: Phaeobacter
- Species: P. inhibens

Binomial name
- Phaeobacter inhibens Martens et al. 2006

Type strain
- CECT 7251, CIP 109289, DSM 16374, LMG 22475, strain T5

Species of bacterium

Phaeobacter inhibens is a bacterium from the genus of Phaeobacter which has been isolated from seawater from Galicia in Spain.
