= Pseudomaribius =

Scientific classification
- Domain: Bacteria
- Kingdom: Pseudomonadati
- Phylum: Pseudomonadota
- Class: Alphaproteobacteria
- Order: Rhodobacterales
- Family: Rhodobacteraceae
- Genus: Pseudomaribius; Park et al. 2018

Type species
- Pseudomaribius aestuariivivens

Species
- P. aestuariivivens

Genus of bacteria

Pseudomaribius is a Gram-negative and non-motile genus of bacteria from the family of Rhodobacteraceae with one known species (Pseudomaribius aestuariivivens). Pseudomaribius aestuariivivens has been isolated from tidal flat sediments from the Yellow Sea in Korea.
