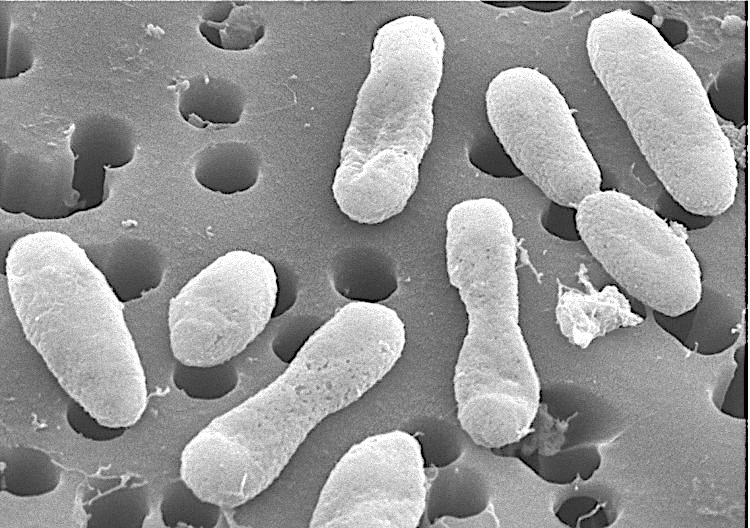
- Roseobacter strain HIMB11

Scientific classification
- Domain: Bacteria
- Kingdom: Pseudomonadati
- Phylum: Pseudomonadota
- Class: Alphaproteobacteria
- Order: Rhodobacterales
- Family: Paracoccaceae
- Genus: Roseobacter; Shiba 1991

Species
- Roseobacter cerasinus Muramatsu et al. 2020; Roseobacter denitrificans Shiba 1991; Roseobacter litoralis Shiba 1991; "Roseobacter pelophilus" Köpke et al. 2007; Roseobacter ponti Jung et al. 2017; "Roseobacter prionitis" Köpke et al. 2007

= Roseobacter =

Genus of bacteria

Roseobacter is a genus of bacteria in the family Roseobacteraceae. The Roseobacter clade falls within the {alpha}-3 subclass of the class Alphaproteobacteria. The first strain descriptions appeared in 1991 which described members Roseobacter litoralis and Roseobacter denitrificans, both pink-pigmented bacteriochlorophyll a-producing strains isolated from marine algae. The role members of the Roseobacter lineage play in marine biogeochemical cycles and climate change cannot be overestimated. Roseobacters make up 25% of coastal marine bacteria and members of this lineage process a significant portion of the total carbon in the marine environment. Roseobacter clade plays an important role in global carbon and sulphur cycles. It can also degrade aromatic compounds, uptake trace metal, and form symbiotic relationship. In term of its application, Roseobacter clade produces bioactive compounds, has been used widely in aquaculture and quorum sensing.

== Description ==
Roseobacter is one of the most abundant and versatile microorganisms in the ocean. They are diversified across different types of marine habitats: from coastal to open oceans and from sea ice to sea floor. They make up around 25% of marine communities. During algal blooms, 20-30% of the prokaryotic community are Roseobacter.

Members of Roseobacter clade display diverse physiologies, and are commonly found to be either free living, particle associated, or in commensal relationships with marine phytoplankton, invertebrates, and vertebrates. Roseobacter are similar to phytoplankton in that both of them colonize surfaces, scavenge iron and produce bioactive secondary metabolites.

== Common Clusters ==
Table 1. The table shows common Roseobacter clusters and their habitats and distribution.
Name	Habitats	Distribution
OCT cluster	90% nonredundant clone is from polar region	55% clone sequences； 45% isolate sequences
CHAB-I-5 cluster	56% nonredundant clone is from coastal seawater	100% clone sequences
DC5-80-3 cluster	79% are from planktonic habitats (surface and deep water)	86% clone sequences
RGALL cluster	Symbiotic relationship with eukaryotic marine organisms	68% cultivated strains
OBULB and SPON clusters	32% nonredundant clone are from coastal seawater; 29% nonredundant clone are from seafloor environments	70% clone sequences
NAC11-7 cluster	60% nonredundant clone is from near-shore seawater	88% clone sequences
DG1128 cluster	From macroalgae and phytoplankton	
AS-21 cluster	From coastal seawater or sediment	
TM1040 cluster	From coastal seawater or sediment	
AS-26 cluster	From coastal seawater or sediment	
ANT9093 cluster	From polar sea ice, sponges, sediments,	

== Genomic features ==
=== Size ===
Most of the Roseobacters analyzed so far have large genomes: ranging from 3.5Mbp to 5.0Mbp. The smallest found is the genome of Loktanella vestfoldensis SKA53 with 3.06 Mbp, the largest that of Roseovarius sp. HTCC2601 with 5.4 Mbp. In Jannaschia sp. CCS1, Silicibacter pomeroyi DSS-3, and Silicibacter sp. TM1040, the fraction of non-orthologous genes form 1/3 of the genomes.

=== Plasmids ===
Plasmids are common to be seen in Roseobacters. The size of plasmids range from 4.3 to 821.7 Kb. They can make up 20% of the genome content. Ecologically relevant genes can be found encoded on plasmids. Genome plasticity could be a reason to explain the diversity and adaptability of Roseobacters, which is supported by the high number of probably conjugative plasmids.

Linear conformation can be exhibited by plasmids, which is common for Roseobacters. In some strains, plasmid borne take place in a large proportion in genome content. Even though the mobility of plasmid has not yet been examined in the strains, they might contribute to the physiological diversity of Roseobacter.

=== Importance of genome study ===
Comparison and analyzation of genomes of Roseobacter clade organisms is important because it can give insight into horizontal gene transfer and specific adaptation processes. As the Roseobacter population is widely distributed worldwide with distinct types of habitats, the success of Roseobacter clade can not be explained by only investigating one single population. Hence, the key to understand why this clade is so abundant is to study the genetic as well as the metabolic diversity of organisms of the whole clade.

== Ecology ==
The Roseobacter clade is mostly found in the marine environment. The various species of Roseobacter each have their own ecological niche. Several isolates have been captured from a vast number of ecosystems in coastal areas and open oceans. Roseobacters are a significant part of bacterial communities connected to phytoplankton, macroalgae, and several marine animals. Different lifestyles such as mutualistic and pathogenic have been proposed. Members of the clade are spread all over temperate and polar oceans, and are also considerable in sea ice ecosystems. They are suggested to be extensive within coastal sediments, deep pelagic ocean, and deep sea sediments. The Roseobacter clade has immense diversity of metabolic proficiency and regulatory circuits, which can be credited to their prosperity in a vast number of marine ecosystems.

== Evolution ==
The Roseobacter clade can be found in coastal areas living freely in bulk seawater or in coastal sediments. In these coastal ecosystems, the Roseobacter clade interact with phytoplankton, macro algae and various marine animals living both mutualistic and pathogenic life styles. The Rosebacter clade can also be found in the deep pelagic ocean, deep-sea sediments and even the polar ocean. The reason why they are abundant in various marine habitats is because they have diverse metabolic capabilities and regulatory circuits.

=== Cultivated Roseobacters ===
It is predicted that the Roseobacter ancestor dates back to around 260 million years ago. They underwent a net genome reduction from a large common ancestral genome followed by two episodes of genome innovation and expansion through lateral gene transfer (LGT).

The first predicted episode of genome expansion was predicted to be around 250 million years ago. It was suggested that the genome expansion was most likely due to new ecological habitats provided by the rise of eukaryotic phytoplankton groups like the dinoflagellates and coccolithophorids. This theory is backed up by the fact that modern lineages of Roseobacters are abundant components of the phycosphere of these two phytoplankton groups. Genes related to mobility and chemotaxis in the ancestor of the Roseobacter clade would have potentially allowed Roseobacter to sense and swim towards these phytoplankton. Later on it was found that some lineages of Roseobacter are also associated with diatoms. All dinoflagellates, coccolithophorids and diatoms are red-plastid-lineage phytoplankton, and the coincidence of the red-plastid radiation and Roseobacter genome innovation is consistent with adaptive evolution. However the mechanism of the genome change is still not identified. Two theories are proposed: that the genome change is either dominated by exaptation where the change occurred prior to the environmental change or positive selection where environmental change is followed by the lateral gene transfer event, which were then selectively favoured.

The second genome innovation is believed to be more recent. It is predicted that the basal lineage with reduced genomes escaped both episodes of genome innovations and become streamlined directly from the common ancestor. Therefore, not all Roseobacter are descendants of the lineages that underwent genome innovation. It is suggested that gene gains appears in favour of genes such as transcriptional genes, repair genes and defence mechanism genes to help Roseobacter to compete with concurring microbial populations on particles and living surfaces in the marine environment.

=== Uncultivated Roseobacters ===
De novo assembly from deeply sequenced metagenomes and single-cell genome sequencing are the two best ways for studying uncultivated Roseobacters without producing an unacceptable level of false positive results. It is found that genomic analyses focusing on cultured Roseobacters can potentially bias our view of the lineage's ecology. A recent study obtained four uncultivated roseobacters from surface waters of the North Pacific, South Atlantic, and Gulf of Maine. This clade appears to represent up to 35% of the Roseobacter sequences in samples from surface ocean waters. These Roseobacters have low G+C content, a reduced percentage of noncoding DNA and are predicted to have streamlined genomes.

== Diversity ==
The Roseobacter clade displays success in multiple marine habitats because of their expansive metabolic capabilities. There is enormous genomic and physiological diversity throughout the major clades, which refer to different size, gene content, GC content, ecological strategy, and trophic strategy. The diversity makes an impact in ecology because of the roles that bacterial lineages play in oceanic elemental cycles, and their connections with marine eukaryotes. The Roseobacter clade represents up to 20% of bacterial cells in certain coastal areas and 3 to 5% in open ocean surface waters.

Largely expanding amounts of genus and species characterizations in the clade shows the physiological and genetic diversity of these organisms. The designations of new strains solely based on the 16s rRNA gene sequences causes increasing difficulty. Some species are considered to be incorporated in one genus, but others argue that the different characteristics should cause the two species to be kept separate. Several bunches of clones and undefined strains have been determined within the Roseobacter clade. This clade is notable for potential genome correlations of closely related strains.

== Functions ==
Members of the Roseobacter clade play an important role in the ecosystem.

=== Global carbon/sulfur cycle ===
Roseobacters are essential in the global carbon and sulfur cycles as well as the climate. Because of its large proportion in the total microbial community, the Roseobacter clade are major contributors to global CO_{2} fixation. Previous studies indicate that within the Roseobacter clade, some members belong to a group named Aerobic Anoxygenic Phototrophs (AAPs), while other members are non-phototrophic. AAPs is the only known organisms that requires oxygen for photosynthesis, but does not produce it. Non-phototrophic members can be used for CO oxidation, while AAPs can conduct CO_{2} fixation as Roseobacters can generate energy through aerobic anoxygenic photosynthesis. Roseobacter has the ability to degrade dimethylsulfoniopropionate (DMSP), an organic sulfur compound produced in abundance by marine algae. Through the degradation of algal osmolytes, they can also produce the climate-relevant gas dimethyl sulfide (DMS).

=== Aromatic compound degradation ===
Roseobacter can degrade aromatic compounds, and are capable of using aromatic compounds as primary growth substrates. Previous research found that Roseobacter degrade lignin-related compounds in a same way. In Roseobacter isolates, the presence of ring cleavage dioxygenases and associated genes of the β-ketoadipate pathway can be important for comparative studies on the ecology of aromatic compound degradation

=== Trace metal uptake ===
Roseobacter clade uptakes trace metal. Generally, larger Roseobacter genomes have greater trace metal uptake versatility and greater plasticity, which might lead to phylogenetically similar genomes having greatly differed capabilities. The acquisition of both organically complexed and inorganic metals of Roseobacter strains can go through multiple diverse pathways, which indicates that roseobacters are able to adapt to and occupy a range of trace metal niches in the marine environment. It also means that the availability of trace metal resources may influence Roseobacter genome diversification. For some members of the Roseobacter clade, trace metal streamlining is also a valuable ecological strategy.

=== Symbiotic and pathogenic relationships ===
The Roseobacter clade can establish symbiotic and pathogenic relationships. Roseobacter strains can form symbiotic relationships with varies eukaryotic marine organisms. Roseobacter phylotypes has been identified in the species of the marine red alga Prionitis. In addition, Roseobacters can develop close relationship with Pfiesteria, where they are found to be within or attached to these dinoflagellates.

Pathogenic relationships, even though little studied and much less common than symbiotic relationships, have also been found in Roseobacter strains. For example, Roseobacter clade members and phylotypes have been indicated to be one of the causes of juvenile oyster disease in the Eastern oyster as well as of black band disease in scleractinian corals.

== Applications ==
=== Bioactive compounds ===
The Roseobacter clade can produce varies types of bioactive compounds. These compounds including algal growth promoters (i.e. auxins) and algaecidal compounds (i.e. the Roseobactides). There are also antimicrobial compounds, toxins, and algaecidal compounds. These compounds have the potential to be used for pharmaceutical or other industrial applications. In addition, with the genome mining of the Roseobacter, it was believed that Roseobacter are also capable of producing other compounds, which could be used as the source of novel bioactive compounds (e.g. novel antibiotics).

=== Larviculture ===
While juvenile and adult fish have a mature immune system and can be vaccinated, the larvae of marine fish and invertebrates are prone to bacterial infections. Marine bacteria from the Roseobacter clade (alpha-proteobacteria) have shown potential as probiotic bacteria to provide an alternative to the use of antibiotics for preventing bacterial diseases. Not only can Roseobactor be used among fish and invertebrate larvae, they can also be used to antagonize fish-pathogenic bacteria without harming the fish or their live feed. Since Roseobacter has such high abundances, accounting for 15 to 20% of oceanic bacterio-plankton communities, they can be used for establishment of synthetic biology chassis for bio-geoengineering activities such as bioremediation of oceanic waste plastic.

=== Quorum sensing ===
Most bacteria have chemical communication systems. Quorum sensing (QS) is a process by which bacteria sense and perceive their own population density through diffusible signals. In the members of the Roseobacter clade, Acyl-homoserine lactone (AHL)-based quorum sensing is widespread: over 80% of available Roseobacterial genomes encode at least one luxI homologue. This shows the significant role of QS controlled regulatory pathways plays in adapting to the relevant marine environments. Among all the available Roseobacterial AHL-based QS, three are most well studied: Phaeobacter inhibens DSM17395, the marine sponge symbiont Ruegeria sp. KLH11 and the dinoflagellate symbiont Dinoroseobacter shibae. However, to understand more fully the ecological role of QS mechanisms, further studies on QS and the signalling process in a greater diversity of Roseobacters is needed.
