= Dimethylsulfoniopropionate =

Chemical compound

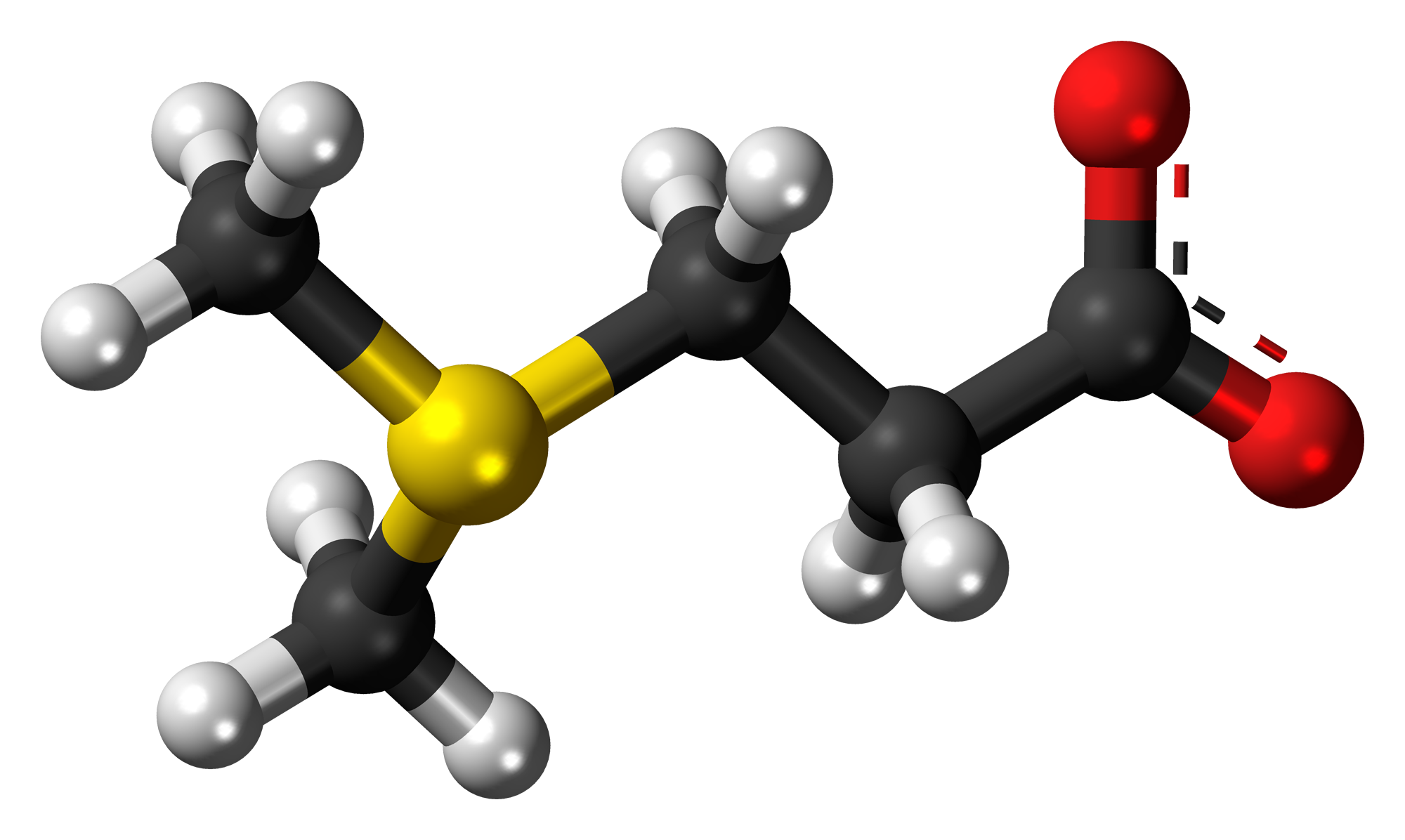

Names
- IUPAC name 3-dimethylsulfoniopropanoate
- Preferred IUPAC name 3-(dimethylsulfaniumyl)propanoate
- Other names Dimethylsulphoniopropionate; Dimethyl-β-propiothetin; S,S-dimethyl-β-propiothetin

Identifiers
CAS Number	7314-30-9
3D model (JSmol)	Interactive image
ChemSpider	22195
ECHA InfoCard	100.228.826
PubChem CID	23736
UNII	C884XA7QGG
CompTox Dashboard (EPA)	DTXSID0041014
- InChI: InChI=1S/C5H10O2S/c1-8(2)4-3-5(6)7/h3-4H2,1-2H3 Key: DFPOZTRSOAQFIK-UHFFFAOYSA-N; InChI=1/C5H10O2S/c1-8(2)4-3-5(6)7/h3-4H2,1-2H3 Key: DFPOZTRSOAQFIK-UHFFFAOYAW
- SMILES: C[S+](C)CCC(=O)[O-]

Properties
Chemical formula	C_{5}H_{10}O_{2}S
Molar mass	134.19 g·mol^{−1}
Appearance	white crystalline hygroscopic powder with a characteristic odor.
Melting point	120 to 125 °C (248 to 257 °F; 393 to 398 K)
- Except where otherwise noted, data are given for materials in their standard state (at 25 °C [77 °F], 100 kPa). verify (what is ?) Infobox references

Dimethylsulfoniopropionate (DMSP), is an organosulfur compound with the formula (CH_{3})_{2}S^{+}CH_{2}CH_{2}COO^{−}. This zwitterionic metabolite can be found in marine phytoplankton, seaweeds, and some species of terrestrial and aquatic vascular plants. It functions as an osmolyte as well as several other physiological and environmental roles have also been identified. DMSP was first identified in the marine red alga Polysiphonia fastigiata.

== Biosynthesis ==
In higher plants, DMSP is biosynthesized from S-methylmethionine. Two intermediates in this conversion are dimethylsulfoniumpropylamine and dimethylsulfoniumpropionaldehyde. In algae, however, the biosynthesis starts with the replacement of the amino group in methionine by hydroxide.

== Degradation ==
DMSP is broken down by marine microbes to form two major volatile sulfur products, each with distinct effects on the environment. One of its breakdown products is methanethiol (CH_{3}SH), which is assimilated by bacteria into protein sulfur. Another volatile breakdown product is dimethyl sulfide (CH_{3}SCH_{3}; DMS). There is evidence that DMS in seawater can be produced by cleavage of dissolved (extracellular) DMSP by the enzyme DMSP-lyase, although many non-marine species of bacteria convert methanethiol to DMS.

DMS is also taken up by marine bacteria, but not as rapidly as methanethiol. Although DMS usually consists of less than 25% of the volatile breakdown products of DMSP, the high reactivity of methanethiol makes the steady-state DMS concentrations in seawater approximately 10 times those of methanethiol (~3 nM vs. ~0.3 nM). There have never been any published correlations between the concentrations of DMS and methanethiol. This is probably due to the non-linear abiotic and microbial uptake of methanethiol in seawater, and the comparatively low reactivity of DMS. However, a significant portion of DMS in seawater is oxidized to dimethyl sulfoxide (DMSO).

Relevant to global climate, DMS is thought to play a role in the Earth's heat budget by decreasing the amount of solar radiation that reaches the Earth's surface. This occurs through degradation of DMS in the atmosphere into hygroscopic compounds that condense water vapor leading to the formation of clouds.

DMSP has also been implicated in influencing the taste and odour characteristics of various products. For example, although DMSP is odourless and tasteless, it is accumulated at high levels in some marine herbivores or filter feeders. DMSP also acts as a foraging cue for a variety of aquatic animals ranging from copepods to marine mammals. Increased growth rates, vigour and stress resistance among animals cultivated on such diets have been reported. In Asia, DMSP/DMPT are widely used in the aquaculture feed industry, particularly for marine fish and crustaceans. DMS, is responsible for repellent, 'off' tastes and odours that develop in some seafood products because of the action of bacterial DMSP-lyase, which cogenerates acrylate.

== See also ==
- CLAW hypothesis, proposing a feedback loop that operates between ocean ecosystems and the Earth's climate
- Coccolithophore, a group of marine unicellular planktonic photosynthetic algae, producer of DMSP
- Dimethyl sulfide, a breakdown product of DMSP along with methanethiol
- Dimethyl selenide, a selenium analogue of DMS produced by bacteria and phytoplankton
- Gephyrocapsa huxleyi, a coccolithophorid producing DMSP
