= List of bacterial genera named after people =

Many bacterial species are named after people, either the discoverer or a famous person in the field of microbiology. For example, Salmonella is named after D.E. Salmon, who discovered it (albeit as "Bacillus typhi").

For the generic epithet, all names derived from people must be in the female nominative case, either by changing the ending to -a or to the diminutive -ella, depending on the name.

For the specific epithet, the names can be converted into either adjectival form (adding -nus (m.), -na (f.), -num (n.) according to the gender of the genus name) or the genitive of the Latinised name.

- Adlercreutzia – H. Adlercreutz, a Finnish professor
- Afifella – S. Afif, a British philosopher and painter
- Agreia – Nina S. Agre, a Russian microbiologist
- Ahrensia – Ahrens, a German microbiologist
- Akkermansia – Antoon Akkermans (1940–2006), a Dutch microbiologist
- Allisonella – M. J. Allison, an American microbiologist
- Ameyamaea – Minoru Ameyama, a Japanese bacteriologist
- Anderseniella – Valérie Andersen, a French bacteriologist
- Andreprevotia – André Romain Prévot (1894–1982), a French bacteriologist
- Annwoodia - Ann P. Wood (1952-), British bacteriologist
- Asaia – Toshinobu Asai (1902–1975), a Japanese bacteriologist
- Neoasaia – Toshinobu Asai (1902–1975), a Japanese bacteriologist
- Asanoa – Koso Asano, a Japanese microbiologist
- Austwickia – Peter K.C. Austwick, a New Zealand botanist
- Barnesiella – Ella M. Barnes, British microbiologist
- Bartonella – Alberto L. Barton, Peruvian physician
- Bauldia – John Bauld, an Australian microbiologist
- Beggiatoa – F. S. Beggiato, a physician of Vicenza
- Beijerinckia – Martinus W. Beijerinck, a Dutch microbiologist
- Belliella – Russell Bell, a Swedish aquatic microbiologist
- Belnapia – Jayne Belnap, an American microbiologist
- Beneckea – W. Benecke, a German bacteriologist
- Bergeriella – U. Berger, a German bacteriologist
- Bergeyella – David Hendricks Bergey, an American bacteriologist
- Bermanella – Tom Berman, an Israeli aquatic microbial ecologist
- Bhargavaea – Pushpa Mittra Bhargava, an Indian biologist
- Bibersteinia – Ernst L. Biberstein, an American bacteriologist
- Bizionia – Bartolomeo Bizio, an Italian naturalist
- Blautia – Michael Blaut, a German microbiologist
- Bordetella – Jules Bordet, a Belgian microbiologist
- Borkar – Suresh Borkar, an Indian scientist
- Borrelia – Amédée Borrel, a French scientist
- Bosea – J. C. Bose, the founder of the Bose Institute
- Bowmanella – John P. Bowman, an Australian microbiologist
- Brackiella – Manfred Brack, a German pathologist
- Branhamella – Sara Branham, an American microbiologist
- Brenneria – Don J. Brenner, an American bacteriologist
- Brucella – Sir David Bruce, a Scottish physician
- Buchnera – Paul Buchner, a German biologist
- Bulleidia – Arthur Bulleid, a British oral microbiologist
- Burkholderia – W. H. Burkholder, an American bacteriologist
- Buttiauxella – René Buttiaux, a French bacteriologist
- Castellaniella – Sir Aldo Castellani, a British-Italian bacteriologist
- Catonella – Elizabeth P. Cato, a United States microbiologist
- Chainia – Ernst Boris Mikaelovich Chain, a German/British microbiologist
- Clevelandina – L. R. Cleveland, an American biologist
- Cobetia – Andre B. Cobet, an American bacteriologist
- Cohnella – Ferdinand Cohn, a German microbiologist
- Collinsella – Matthew D. Collins, a British microbiologist
- Colwellia – Rita R. Colwell, an American bacteriologist
- Costertonia – J. W. Costerton, an American bacteriologist
- Couchioplanes – J. N. Couch, an American mycologist
- Cowdria – E. V. Cowdry, an American rickettsiologist
- Coxiella – Herald R. Cox, an American microbiologist
- Crabtreella – K. Crabtree, an American microbiologist
- Crossiella – Thomas Cross, a British microbiologist
- Dasania – Dasan, a Korean scientist
- Deleya – Jozef De Ley, a Belgian microbiologist
- Derxia – H. G. Derx, a Dutch microbiologist
- Devosia – Paul De Vos, a Belgian microbiologist
- Devriesea – L. A. Devriese, a Belgian veterinary microbiologist
- Dickeya – Robert S. Dickey, an American phytopathologist
- Dietzia – Alma Dietz, an American microbiologist
- Dongia – Xiu-Zhu Dong, a Chinese bacteriologist and bacterial taxonomist
- Dorea – Joël Doré, a French microbiologist
- Dubosiella – René Dubos, an American microbiologist
- Duganella – P. R. Dugan, an American microbiologist
- Dyella – Douglas W. Dye, a New Zealand microbiologist
- Edwardsiella – Philip R. Edwards (1901-1966), an American bacteriologist
- Eggerthella – Arnold H. Eggerth, an American bacteriologist
- Paraeggerthella – Arnold H. Eggerth, an American bacteriologist
- Ehrlichia – Paul Ehrlich, a German bacteriologist
- Eikenella – M. Eiken, a Scandinavian biologist
- Elioraea – Eliora Z. Ron, an Israeli microbiologist
- Elizabethkingia – Elizabeth O. King, an American bacteriologist
- Erwinia – Erwin Frink Smith, an American bacteriologist
- Escherichia – Theodor Escherich, a German physician
- Euzebya – Jean P. Euzéby, a French bacteriologist
- Euzebyella – Jean P. Euzéby, a French bacteriologist
- Ewingella – William H. Ewing, an American bacteriologist
- Facklamia – Richard R. Facklam, an American bacteriologist
- Fangia – Xinfang Fang, a Chinese microbiologist
- Finegoldia – S. M. Finegold, an American bacteriologist
- Francisella – Edward Francis, an American bacteriologist
- Frankia – Albert Bernhard Frank, a Swiss microbiologist
- Frateuria – Joseph Frateur, a Belgian microbiologist
- Friedmanniella – E. Imre Friedmann, an American microbiologist
- Fryxelliella - Greta Fryxell, marine scientist known for her work on diatoms
- Gallionella – B. Gallion, a receiver of customs and zoologist (1782–1839) in Dieppe, France
- Garciella – Jean-Louis Garcia, a French microbiologist
- Gardnerella – H. L. Gardner, an American bacteriologist
- Georgfuchsia – Georg Fuchs, a German bacteriologist
- Gibbsiella – John N. Gibbs, a British forest pathologist
- Giesbergeria – G. Giesberger, a Dutch microbiologist
- Gillisia – Monique Gillis, a Belgian bacteriologist
- Goodfellowiella (in place of the illegitimate name Goodfellowia) – Michael Goodfellow, a British microbiologist
- Gordonia – Ruth E. Gordon, an American bacteriologist
- Gordonibacter – Jeffrey I. Gordon, an American bacteriologist
- Grahamella – George Stuart Graham Smith, a British microbiologist
- Gramella – Hans Christian Gram, a Danish pharmacologist and pathologist
- Grimontia – Patrick A. D. Grimont, a French microbiologist
- Guggenheimella – Bernhard Guggenheim, a Swiss microbiologist
- Gulbenkiania – Calouste Gulbenkian, a Portuguese protector of the arts and sciences
- Pseudogulbenkiania – alouste Gulbenkian, a Portuguese protector of the arts and sciences
- Haemobartonella – Albert L. Barton, Peruvian physician
- Hahella – Yung Chil Hah, a Korean bacteriologist
- Hallella – Ivan C. Hall, a United States microbiologist
- Hamadaea – Masa Hamada, a Japanese microbiologist
- Hansschlegelia – Hans G. Schlegel, a German microbiologist
- Haslea - Grethe Rytter Hasle, a Norwegian scientist known for her work on diatoms
- Henriciella – Arthur T. Henrici, an American microbiologist
- Hespellia – Robert B. Hespell, an American microbiologist
- Hippea – Hans Hippe, a German microbiologist
- Hirschia – Peter Hirsch, a German microbiologist
- Hoeflea – Manfred Höfle, a German microbiologist
- Holdemania – Lillian V. Holdeman Moore, an American microbiologist
- Hollandina – André Hollande Jr., a French protistologist
- Hongia – Soon-Woo Hong, a Korean microbiologist
- Hongiella – Soon-Woo Hong, a Korean microbiologist
- Howardella – Bernard Howard, a New Zealand microbiologist
- Hoyosella – Manuel Hoyos, a pioneer in the research for the protection of Altamira Cave paintings
- Hylemonella – Philip B. Hylemon, an American bacteriologist
- Hyunsoonleella – Hyun-Soon Lee, a Korean microbiologist
- Ignatzschineria (in place of the illegitimate name Schineria) – Ignaz Rudolph Schiner, an Austrian entomologist
- Imhoffiella – Johannes F. Imhoff, a German microbiologist
- Jahnella – Eduard Adolf Wilhelm Jahn
- Jannaschia – Holger W. Jannasch, a German microbiologist
- Jiangella – Cheng-Lin Jiang, a Chinese microbiologist
- Jishengella – Jisheng Ruan, a Chinese microbiologist
- Johnsonella – John L. Johnson, a United States microbiologist
- Jonesia – Dorothy Jones, a British microbiologist
- Jonquetella – Professor Jonquet, a French clinician
- Joostella – P. J. Jooste, a South African bacteriologist
- Kalamii - Dr. A P J Abdul Kalam, an Indian aerospace scientist & 11th President of India.
- Kangiella – Kook Hee Kang, a Korean microbiologist
- Kerstersia – Karel Kersters, a Belgian microbiologist
- Kingella – Elizabeth O. King, an American bacteriologist
- Kitasatoa – Shibasaburo Kitasato, a Japanese bacteriologist
- Kitasatospora – Shibasaburo Kitasato, a Japanese bacteriologist
- Klebsiella – Edwin Klebs, a German bacteriologist
- Klugiella – Michael J. Klug, an American entomologist/microbiologist
- Kluyvera – Albert Jan Kluyver, a Dutch microbiologist
- Knoellia – Hans Knöll, a German pioneer in antibiotic research
- Kocuria – Miroslav Kocur, a Slovak microbiologist
- Kofleria – Ludwig Kofler, an Austrian scientist
- Koserella – Stewart A. Koser (1894-1971), an American bacteriologist
- Kozakia – Michio Kozaki, a Japanese microbiologist
- Krasilnikovia – Nikolai Aleksandrovich Krasil'nikov, a Russian actinomycetologist
- Kriegella – Noel R. Krieg, an American microbiologist
- Kurthia – H. Kurth, a German bacteriologist
- Kushneria – Donn Kushner, an American Canadian scientist
- Allokutzneria – Donn Kushner, a Canadian microbiologist
- Kutzneria – Hans-Jürgen Kutzner, a German microbiologist
- Labedella – David P. Labeda, an American bacteriologist
- Labrenzia – Matthias Labrenz, a German marine microbiologist
- Laceyella – John Lacey, a British microbiologist
- Larkinella – John M. Larkin, an American microbiologist
- Lautropia – H. Lautrop, a Danish bacteriologist
- Lawsonia – G. H. K. Lawson, an American bacteriologist
- Leadbetterella – Edward R. Leadbetter, an American microbiologist
- Lebouraia, Marie Lebour, a British marine biologist
- Lebouridinium, Marie Lebour, a British marine biologist
- Lechevalieria – Hubert and Mary Lechevalier, an American microbiologist
- Leclercia – H. Leclerc, a French bacteriologist
- Leeia – Keho Lee, a Korean microbiologist
- Leeuwenhoekiella – Antonie van Leeuwenhoek, a Dutch scientist
- Leifsonia – Einar Leifson, an American microbiologist
- Leisingera – Thomas Leisinger, a Swiss bacteriologist
- Leminorella – Léon Le Minor, a French bacteriologist
- Lentzea – Friedrich A. Lentze, a German microbiologist
- Levinea – Max Levine, an American bacteriologist
- Lewinella – Ralph Lewin, an American bacteriologist
- Lishizhenia – Li Shizhen, a famous Chinese naturalist
- Listeria – Lord Lister, a British surgeon
- Listonella – J. Liston, an American bacteriologist
- Loktanella – Tjhing-Lok Tan from the Alfred Wegener Institute in Bremerhaven
- Luedemannella – G. M. Luedemann, a Russian actinomycetologist
- Mahella – Robert A. Mah, an American microbiologist
- Malikia – Kuhrsheed A. Malik, a German microbiologist
- Mannheimia – Walter Mannheim, a German microbiologist
- Martelella – E. Martel, a French explorer
- Marvinbryantia (in place of the illegitimate name Bryantella) – Marvin P. Bryant, an American microbiologist
- Millisia – Nancy F. Millis, an Australian microbiologist
- Mitsuokella – T. Mitsuoka, a Japanese bacteriologist
- Moellerella – V. Møller, a Danish microbiologist
- Moorella – W. E. C. Moore, an American microbiologist
- Moraxella – Victor Morax, a Swiss ophthalmologist
- Morganella – Harry de Riemer Morgan (1863–1931), a British bacteriologist
- Moritella – Richard Y. Morita, an American microbiologist
- Paramoritella – Richard Y. Morita, an American microbiologist
- Moryella – Francine Mory, a French bacteriologist
- Murdochiella – David A. Murdoch, a British microbiologist
- Nakamurella – Kazonuri Nakamura, a Japanese microbiologist
- Neisseria – Albert Neisser, a German bacteriologist
- Nesterenkonia – Olga Nesterenko, a Ukrainian microbiologist
- Nicoletella – Jacques Nicolet, a Swiss microbiologist
- Nocardia – Edmond Nocard, a French veterinarian and microbiologist
- Nocardioides, Nocardiopsis, Pseudonocardia:
- Nonomuraea – H. Nonomura, a Japanese taxonomist of actinomycetes
- Ohtaekwangia – Oh Tae-Kwang, a Korean microbiologist
- Oerskovia – Jeppe Ørskov, a Danish microbiologist
- Paraoerskovia – Jeppe Ørskov, a Danish microbiologist
- Olleya – June Olley, a British bacteriologist
- Olsenella – Ingar Olsen, a Norwegian microbiologist
- Orenia – Aharon Oren, an Israeli bacteriologist
- Ottowia – Johannes C. G. Ottow, a German bacteriologist
- Owenweeksia – Owen B. Weeks, an American bacteriologist
- Palleronia – Norberto Palleroni, an American bacteriologist
- Pasteurella – Louis Pasteur, a French scientist
- Pasteuria – Louis Pasteur, a French scientist
- Pelczaria – M. J. Pelczar, an American bacteriologist
- Pfennigia – Norbert Pfennig, a German bacteriologist
- Pillotina – J. Pillot, a French microbiologist
- Piscirickettsia – Howard Taylor Ricketts, an American pathologist
- Prauserella – Helmut Prauser, a German microbiologist
- Prevotella – André Romain Prévot, a French bacteriologist
- Paraprevotella:
- Quinella – J. I. Quin, a South African microbiologist
- Rahnella – Otto Rahn, a German-American microbiologist
- Ralstonia – E. Ralston, an American bacteriologist
- Raoultella – Didier Raoult, a French microbiologist
- Rathayibacter – E. Rathay, an Australian plant pathologist
- Reichenbachiella (in place of the illegitimate name Reichenbachia) – Hans Reichenbach, a German microbiologist
- Rheinheimera – Gerhard Rheinheimer, a German marine microbiologist
- Rickettsia – Howard Taylor Ricketts, an American pathologist
- Neorickettsia – Howard Taylor Ricketts, an American pathologist
- Riemerella – Riemer.
- Robinsoniella – Isadore M. Robinson, an American microbiologist
- Rochalimaea – Henrique da Rocha-Lima, a Brazilian bacteriologist
- Roseburia – Theodor Rosebury, an American microbiologist
- Rothia – Genevieve D. Roth, an American bacteriologist
- Ruania – Ji-Sheng Ruan, a Chinese microbiologist
- Ruegeria – Hans-Jürgen Rüger, a German microbiologist
- Rummeliibacillus – John Rummel, an American astrobiologist
- Salmonella – Daniel E. Salmon, a U.S. veterinary surgeon
- Samsonia – Régine Samson, a French phytobacteriologist
- Scardovia – Vittorio Scardovi, an Italian microbiologist
- Aeriscardovia, Parascardovia, Alloscardovia, Metascardovia:
- Schineria – Ignaz Rudolph Schiner, who first described the fly Wohlfahrtia magnifica
- Schlegelella – H. G. Schlegel, a German microbiologist
- Schlesneria – Heinz Schlesner, a German microbiologist
- Schumannella – P. Schumann, a German microbiologist
- Schwartzia – Helen M. Schwartz, a South African rumen physiologist
- Sebaldella – Madeleine Sebald, a French bacteriologist
- Seinonella – Akio Seino, a Japanese microbiologist
- Seliberia – G. L. Seliber, a Russian microbiologist
- Serratia – Serafino Serrati, an Italian monk and physicist
- Sharpea – Michaela E. Sharpe, a British bacteriologist
- Shewanella – J. M. Shewan, a British bacteriologist
- Alishewanella – J. M. Shewan, a British bacteriologist
- Shigella – Kiyoshi Shiga, a Japanese bacteriologist
- Shimazuella – Akira Shimazu, a Japanese microbiologist
- Shimia – Jae H. Shim, a Korean microbiologist
- Shimwellia – J. L. Shimwell.
- Shinella – Yong-Kook Shin, a Japanese microbiologist
- Shuttleworthia – Cyril Shuttleworth, a British microbiologist
- Simiduia – Usio Simidu, a Japanese microbiologist
- Simkania – Arbitrary name formed from the personal name Simona Kahane
- Simonsiella – Hellmuth Simons, a German bacteriologist
- Skermanella – Victor B. D. Skerman, an Australian bacteriologist and taxonomist
- Skermania – Victor B. D. Skerman, an Australian bacteriologist and taxonomist
- Slackia – Geoffrey Slack, a British microbiologist and dental researcher
- Smithella – Paul H. Smith, an American microbiologist
- Sneathia – P. H. A. Sneath, a British bacteriologist
- Sneathiella – P. H. A. Sneath, a British bacteriologist
- Soehngenia – Nicolas L. Soehngen, a Dutch microbiologist
- Soonwooa – Soon-Woo Hong, a Korean microbiologist
- Stackebrandtia – Erko Stackebrandt, a German microbiologist
- Staleya – James T. Staley, an American microbiologist
- Stanierella – Roger Y. Stanier, a Canadian microbiologist
- Stappia – Stapp, a Belgian microbiologist
- Starkeya – Robert L. Starkey, an American bacteriologist
- Stetteria – Karl Otto Stetter, a German biologist
- Sutterella – Vera Sutter, an American bacteriologist
- Parasutterella – Vera Sutter, an American bacteriologist
- Suttonella – R. G. A. Sutton, a British bacteriologist
- Swaminathania – Swaminathan, an Indian biologist
- Tannerella – Anne C. R. Tanner, an American microbiologist
- Tanticharoenia – Morakot Tanticharoen, a Thai bacteriologist
- Tatlockia – Hugh Tatlock, an American microbiologist
- Tatumella – Harvey Tatum, an American bacteriologist
- Taylorella – C. E. D. Taylor, a British bacteriologist
- Terasakiella – Y. Terasaki, a Japanese microbiologist
- Thauera – R. Thauer, a German bacteriologist
- Thorsellia – Walborg Thorsell, a Swedish biologist
- Tindallia – Brian Tindall, a British bacteriologist
- Tistlia – Michael Tistl, a German geologist
- Tissierella – P. H. Tissier, a French bacteriologist
- Tomitella – Fusao Tomita, a Japanese microbiologist
- Trabulsiella – L. R. Trabulsi, a Brazilian bacteriologist
- Truepera – Hans G. Trüper, a German bacteriologist
- Tsukamurella – Michio Tsukamura, a Japanese microbiologist
- Turneriella – Leslie Turner, a British microbiologist
- Umezawaea – Hamao Umezawa, a Japanese bacteriologist
- Uruburuella – Federico Uruburu, a Spanish microbiologist
- Vasilyevaea – Lina Vasilyeva, a Russian microbiologist
- Veillonella – Adrien Veillon (1864-1931), a French bacteriologist
- Vogesella – Otto Voges, a German microbiologist
- Volcaniella – B. Elazari-Volcani, an Israeli bacteriologist
- Wautersia – Georges Wauters, a Belgian microbiologist
- Wautersiella – Georges Wauters, a Belgian microbiologist
- Weeksella – Owen B. Weeks, an American bacteriologist
- Weissella – Norbert Weiss, a German bacteriologist
- Wenxinia – Wen-Xin Chen, a Chinese microbiologist
- Wigglesworthia – V. B. Wigglesworth, a British parasitologist
- Williamsia – Stanley T. Williams, a British microbiologist
- Winogradskyella – Sergey Winogradsky, a Russian microbiologist
- Wolbachia – Simeon B. Wolbach, an American bacteriologist
- Wolinella – M. J. Wolin, an American bacteriologist
- Xiangella – Hua Xiang, a Chinese microbiologist
- Yangia – H.-F. Yang, a Chinese microbiologist
- Yaniella (in place of the illegitimate name Yania) – Xun-Chu Yan, a Chinese microbiologist
- Yersinia – Alexandre Yersin, a Swiss bacteriologist
- Yonghaparkia – Yong-Ha Park, a Korean microbiologist
- Yuhushiella – Yuhu Shi, a Chinese microbiologist
- Zavarzinella – Georgii A. Zavarzin, a Russian bacteriologist
- Zavarzinia – Georgii A. Zavarzin, a Russian bacteriologist
- Zhangella – Shu-Zheng Zhang, a Chinese biochemist
- Zhihengliuella – Zhi-Heng Liu, a Chinese microbiologist
- Zhouia – Pei-Jin Zhou, a Chinese microbiologist
- Zimmermannella – O.E.R. Zimmermann, a German microbiologist
- Zobellella – Claude E. ZoBell, an American bacteriologist
- Zobellia – Claude E. ZoBell, an American bacteriologist
- Pseudozobellia – Claude E. ZoBell, an American bacteriologist
- Zooshikella – Zoo Shik Lee, a Korean microbiologist
- Zunongwangia – Zu-Nong Wang, a Chinese microbiologist

== See also ==
- LPSN, list of accepted bacterial and archaeal names
- List of Archaea genera
- List of Bacteria genera
- List of bacterial genera named after geographical names
- List of bacterial genera named after institutions
- List of bacterial genera named after mythological figures
- List of clinically important bacteria
- List of organisms named after famous people
- List of taxa named by anagrams
