= List of bacterial genera named after mythological figures =

Several bacterial species are named after Greek or Roman mythical figures. The rules present for species named after a famous person do not apply, although some names are changed in the female nominative case, either by changing the ending to -a or to the diminutive -ella, depending on the name.

- Acidianus and Janibacter: Janus, a god in Roman mythology with two faces.
- Amphritea: Amphitrite ('Αμφιτρίτη), a sea-goddess and wife of Poseidon in Greek mythology and one of the 50 daughters of Nereus and Doris.
- Breoghania: Breogán, the first mythical Celtic king of Gallaecia in Celtic mythology.
- Chimaereicella: Chimaera (Χίμαιρα), a Greek mythological monstrous fire-breathing female creature with the fore part a lion, in the hinder a serpent, and in the middle a goat.
- Cronobacter: Cronos (Κρόνος), in Greco-Roman mythology leader of the Titans who swallowed each of his children as soon as they were born, excluding Zeus.
- Demetria: Demeter, the Greek goddess of harvest.
- Ekhidna: Echidna (Ἔχιδνα), a slimy woman/snake sea creature in Greek mythology.
- Eudoraea: Eudora (Εὐδώρα), one of the Hyades in Greek mythology
- Haliea: Halie (Ἁλίη), a sea nymph, also one of the 50 daughters of Nereus and Doris.
- Hellea: Helle (Ἕλλη), a Greek sea goddess.
- Melitea: Melite (Μελίτη), one of the naiads, daughter of the river god Aegaeus, and one of the many loves of Zeus and his son Heracles. Her son was Hylas.
- Neptuniibacter and Neptunomonas: Neptune, the Roman god of the sea, equivalent of the Greek Poseidon.
- Nereida: A Nereid, which are sea nymphs daughters of Nereus.
- Nisaea: Nicaea, a sea nymph and daughter of the river-god Sangarius and Cybele.
- Opitutus: Ops, a Roman Earth and harvest goddess married to Saturn. Equivalent of the Greek Rhea.
- Pandoraea: Pandora (Πανδώρα), the first woman who opened a jar, known as Pandora's box releasing evil into the world, in Greek mythology.
- Persephonella: Persephone (also known as Kore), is the daughter of Zeus and the harvest goddess Demeter, and queen of the underworld; she was abducted by Hades the king of the underworld.
- Proteus and Thermoproteus: Proteus (Πρωτεύς), an early sea-god able to change himself into different shapes.
- Telluria: Tellus, a Roman goddess personifying the Earth.
- Vampirovibrio: A vampire, mythological beings who subsist by feeding on the life essence of other creatures.
- Vulcanibacillus, Vulcanisaeta and Vulcanithermus: Vulcanus, the Roman god of fire.

== See also ==
- List of Archaea genera
- List of Bacteria genera
- List of bacterial genera named after geographical names
- List of bacterial genera named after institutions
- List of bacterial genera named after personal names
- List of bacterial orders
- List of clinically important bacteria
- List of Latin and Greek words commonly used in systematic names
- List of sequenced archaeal genomes
- List of sequenced prokaryotic genomes
- List of taxa named by anagrams
- LPSN, list of accepted bacterial and archaeal names
- Synonym (taxonomy)
- Taxonomy
