= List of bacterial genera named after institutions =

Several bacterial species are named after institutions, including acronyms which are spelled as they would be read; e.g., CDC becomes Ce+de+ce+a. The names are changed in the female nominative case, either by changing the ending to -a or to the diminutive -ella, depending on the name.

- Afipia – AFIP (Armed Force Institute of Pathology), USA
- Basfia – BASF SE (a chemical company in Ludwigshafen, Germany)
- Cedecea – CDC (Centers for Disease Control), USA
- Deefgea – DFG (Deutsche Forschungsgemeinschaft; German Science Foundation), Germany
- Desemzia – DSMZ (Deutsche Sammlung von Mikroorganismen und Zellkulturen), Germany
- Emticicia – MTCC (Microbial Type Culture Collection and Gene Bank), India
- Iamia – IAM (Institute of Applied Microbiology at the University of Tokyo), Japan
- Ideonella – Ideon Research Center, University of Lund, Sweden
- Inhella – Inha University, Korea
- Kaistella – KAIST (Korea Advanced Institute of Science and Technology), Korea
- Kaistia – KAIST (Korea Advanced Institute of Science and Technology), Korea
- Kistimonas – KIST (Korea Institute of Science and Technology ), Korea
- Kordia – KORDI (Korea Ocean Research and Development Institute), Korea
- Kordiimonas – KORDI (Korea Ocean Research and Development Institute), Korea
- Kribbella – KRIBB (Korean Research Institute of Bioscience and Biotechnology), Korea
- Kribbia – KRIBB (Korean Research Institute of Bioscience and Biotechnology), Korea
- Lonepinella – Lone Pine Koala Sanctuary (a private zoo), Australia
- Mameliella – MME laboratory (Marine microbial ecology laboratory), China
- Mesonia – MES (Marine Experimental Station of the Pacific Institute of Bioorganic Chemistry), Russia
- Niabella – NIAB (National Institute of Agricultural Biotechnology), Korea
- Niastella – NIAST (National Institute of Agricultural Science and Technology), Korea
- Nubsella – NUBS (Nihon University College of Bioresource Sciences), Japan
- Pibocella – PIBOC (Pacific Institute of Bioorganic Chemistry), Russia
- Rikenella – RIKEN (Rikagaku Kenkyusho; Institute of Physical and Chemical Research), Japan
- Rudaea – RDA (Rural Development Administration), Korea
- Rudanella – RDA (Rural Development Administration), Korea
- Sciscionella – SCISCIO (South China Sea Institute of Oceanology), China
- Stakelama – State Key Laboratory of Marine Environment Science, China
- Tistrella – TISTR (Thailand Institute of Scientific and Technological Research), Thailand
- Waddlia – WADDL (Washington Animal Disease Diagnostic-Laboratory), USA
- Woodsholea – Woods Hole Oceanographic Institution, Massachusetts, USA
- Yimella – YIM (Yunnan Institute of Microbiology), China
- Yokenella – Kokuritsu-yoboueisei-kenkyusho (National Institute of Disease Prevention and Health), Japan

== See also ==
- List of bacterial genera named after geographical names
- List of bacterial genera named after personal names
- List of bacterial genera named after mythological figures
- list of Latin and Greek words commonly used in systematic names
- List of Bacteria genera
- List of bacterial orders
- List of sequenced prokaryotic genomes
- List of clinically important bacteria
- List of sequenced archaeal genomes
- List of Archaea genera
- Synonym (taxonomy)
- Taxonomy
- LPSN, list of accepted bacterial and archaeal names
