= Thorsell =

Thorsell is a Swedish surname. Notable people with the surname include:

- Björn Thorsell (born 1964), Swedish ice hockey player
- Elisabeth Thorsell (born 1945), Swedish writer and professional genealogist
- Eric Thorsell (1898–1980)
- Johan Thorsell (born 1974), Swedish singer
- Staffan Thorsell (born 1943), Swedish journalist and author
- Walborg Thorsell (1919–2016), Swedish scientist
- William Thorsell (born 1945), Canadian journalist
