= Coetzee =

Afrikaans surname

Coetzee (Afrikaans: [kutˈsiə]) is an Afrikaans surname. It is the tenth most common family name in South Africa.

== Origin ==
Unlike many South African family names that are easily traced back to English, Dutch, or Huguenot French, the origin of the name Coetzee is unclear. It is known to date back to Dirk Coetzee, who came to Cape Colony from Kampen, Netherlands, in the 17th century.

The Dutch linguist Jan-Wouter Zwart suggested in a 2018 essay that the name derives from the common Dutch name Koetsier, guided by its pronunciation.

== Notable people with the surname "Coetzee" ==
- Allister Coetzee (born 1963), South African rugby coach
- Basil Coetzee (1944–1998), South African musician
- Clem Coetzee (c. 1939–2006), Zimbabwean conservationist
- Clemencia Coetzee, Namibian politician
- Danie Coetzee (born 1977), South African rugby union footballer
- Dirk Coetzee (1945–2013), co-founder and commander of a covert South African Police unit in the 1990s
- Felix Coetzee (born 1959), South African jockey in Thoroughbred horse racing
- George Coetzee (born 1986), South African golfer
- Gerald Coetzee (born 2000), South African cricketer
- Gerrie Coetzee (1955–2023), South African boxer
- Hannes Coetzee (born 1944), South African guitarist
- Hendrik Coetzee (c. 1975–2010), South African adventurer
- J. M. Coetzee (born 1940), South African-Australian author awarded the 2003 Nobel Prize in Literature
- Jan Boland Coetzee (1945–2025), South African rugby union player and wine maker
- Jandre Coetzee (born 1984), South African first-class cricketer
- Jeff Coetzee (born 1977), South African tennis player
- Justin Coetzee (born 1984), South African-Australian cricketer
- Lee Coetzee (born 1984), South African cricketer
- Louzanne Coetzee (born 1993), South African para-athlete
- Maureen Coetzee (born 1951), South African entomologist
- Pietie Coetzee (born 1978), South African field hockey player
- Rivaldo Coetzee (born 1996), South African footballer
- Ryan Coetzee (born 1973), South African politician, political strategist, and businessman
- Ryan Coetzee (swimmer) (born 1995), South African swimmer
- Tansey Coetzee (born 1984), Miss South Africa 2008

== See also ==
- Kotze / Kotzé, alternative spelling, notable people carrying the surname
