= Korean Minjok Leadership Academy =

High school in Hoengseong, South Korea

Coordinates: 37°27′36″N 128°08′36″E

- 민족사관고등학교
- Hoengseong, Gangwon Province; South Korea

Information
- Type: Private, boarding
- Motto: 민족 주체성 교육 (English: Deep Awareness of the Heritage of Our People)
- Established: 1996; 30 years ago
- Headmaster: Park Ha-sik, Ph. D. Philosophy.
- Grades: 10–12
- Gender: Co-educational
- Enrollment: 456 (2025)
- Student to teacher ratio: 5.8:1
- Campus size: 1,274,350 square metres (314.90 acres)
- Campus type: Rural
- Slogan: Korea in Heart, World in Mind
- Website: english.minjok.hs.kr

Korean name
- Hangul: 민족사관고등학교
- Hanja: 民族史觀高等學校
- RR: Minjok sagwan godeunghakgyo
- MR: Minjok sagwan kodŭnghakkyo

School location in Hoengseong, Gangwon Province .

Korean Minjok Leadership Academy (KMLA; Korean: 민족사관고등학교; Hanja: 民族史觀高等學校; lit. 'People's History High School') is a co-educational, independent boarding high school near the town of Hoengseong, Gangwon, South Korea, 120 kilometers (75 mi) east of Seoul at an elevation of 600 meters (2,000 feet). Located on 1.27 square kilometers (310 acres), it is one of the largest institutions in terms of contiguous area in the nation. One of the most selective secondary boarding schools in South Korea, KMLA is reputable for the placement of its graduates at eminent universities. KMLA is a member of the G20 Schools group.

== History ==
School founder Choi Myung-Jae found reason in establishing KMLA upon a visit to England's Eton College in 1977, feeling the need for an institution of high character to nurture future global leaders in Korea.

Choi received government permission to establish the school in 1993. The first headmaster and faculty were appointed on 1 March 1995, and the school received its first students a year later. The gym was completed in December 1996, and Dasan Hall (one of the two main school buildings) was completed the following year.

The school's 'English-only policy' (EOP) was established in January 1997 and was applied to all areas of the school except a few non-English classes. In the same year, Choi was appointed school director. In 1998, the school's three step education policy of teaching-discussion-writing was institutionalized, the first elections for the student council were held, and the Minjok Herald was first published. In 1999, the graduation of the first wave was held and the twelve-floor dormitory was completed. In 2000, Choi Kyung-Jong was appointed director.

In 2001, the school was certified as an Educational Testing Service AP test center and designated as an experimental independent private school by the South Korean government. In 2002, founder Choi Myung-Jae took office as the fourth headmaster. In 2003, the school held its first mathematics competition for middle school students, and the former minister of education, Lee Don-Hee was appointed headmaster that August. In 2004, the school inaugurated the Global Leadership Program for Students (GLPS), established an individual research program, and achieved certification to administer the SAT and PSAT.

In 2007, KMLA was highlighted by the US College Board as a World Best School in the Advanced Placement Program in seven subjects expanded from four subjects the year before—calculus, chemistry, microeconomics, macroeconomics, physics, and statistics. That same year, the Wall Street Journal listed the school's international program at No. 32 among schools that matriculated students to eight most-selective American colleges and universities. The school has an average SAT score of 2260.

With the commencement of the new semester in 2008, Cheong-il Yoon, Ph.D., former dean of education at Seoul National University, assumed the headmastership. Under his leadership, reforms have been initiated, namely the increased and systematized effort to fund raise as well as the plan to make international teachers comprise 30 percent of its faculty. In 2011, the KMLA's first music concert was held.

After former headmaster, Han Man-wi, resigned, Park Ha-sik, Ph.D., former dean of education at Yonsei University, assumed the headmaster in 2025.

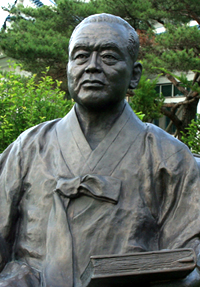
Statue of founder Choi Myung-jae sits on the campus grounds

== Description ==
Some of KMLA's characteristics and policies are as follows:

- Support for the teachers' academic research;
- Individual college counseling for students regardless of field;
- Daily physical training (morning exercise) in forms of Taekwondo and Kumdo;
- Promotion of classes and clubs for Korean traditional music and arts, including Samul Nori, Daegeum, and Gayageum;
- Individual Research (IR) hours granted within the regular curricula;
- Unsupervised examination policy;
- Wide variety of clubs including athletic teams, orchestra, school bands, community service groups, student publications, craft workshop sessions, and peer tutoring.

=== Admission Process ===
The admission process of KMLA goes through three steps – a first round selection of students is admitted based on application forms containing school grades, essay, and extra curricular activities. Selected students then go through an interview, and a physical test (4 km track); those who achieve generalized top evaluations are admitted.

=== Achievements ===
Throughout school history, KMLA students have received awards in international competitions such as in Olympiads in science, mathematics, debating and philosophy. Approximately one-thirds of the graduates enroll in foreign universities, mostly in the United States. The annual cost of attending KMLA is estimated to be $40,000 (2025).

=== Symbols, song, and motto ===
The symbols of the school are Yi Sun-sin and Jeong Yak-yong. The school song is written in the form of sijo, folk song, and march. The school song consists of the school history and eventual goal of the school. Singing the song in morning assemblies and school events, students promote school pride and community spirit. Every Monday at the end of the morning assembly, all students and teachers stand up and sing the school song accompanied by the KMLA Orchestra or the Minjok Orchestra. The motto is as follows.

Endowed with national pride in heart, and our fatherland's bright future in mind, let us study not for the sake of personal gain but for the sake of learning itself. Let us not choose a career based on thoughts of personal advancement but choose a career based on talents and aptitude. Such is my true happiness, tomorrow's bright fatherland, and a better world for all.

== School life ==
KMLA students are enrolled either on the domestic track (Minjok field) or on the international track, depending on their plans for college application. Beginning in 2008, KMLA has begun to select students without differentiation by separate tracks, enabling the students to make their decisions concerning college during their high school years without unnecessary pressure.

In the beginning years of KMLA, the entrance exam allowed only 20 to 30 passing students, but has steadily increased the number of new students from 2003. From 2004 to 2009, the school admitted 150 students. However, corresponding with the plans of the school to increase its size, an enrollment of around 160 students in 2010 marked the most recent entry of students into the school.

Although the largest number of KMLA students are from Seoul and Gyeonggi Province, students come from all over the country, as far as Jeju. Moreover, numerous students from nations abroad, including China, Canada, France, Japan, Australia, and the United States, have been granted admission.

=== School Policies ===
==== Morning Assembly ====
All students and teachers gather at the school gym every Monday on the 1st period for the weekly Morning Assembly. The assembly begins with the 의례단 entering the gymnasium, followed by the teachers. Students who are Korean citizens must sing the national anthem with honour and respect to the Korean flag. Every week, a teacher or student (sometimes both) give a speech on various topics, the most popular topic being school life. The two school orchestras, KMLA orchestra and Minjok Orchestra, take turns in performing the school song and national anthem during the assembly. During the Award Ceremony, awards are given to students who have performed well in contests in and out of school. The president of the Legislative Council also gives a small brief of the week's school events.

==== The English-Only Policy (EOP) ====
All students are required to speak in English from eight in the morning to six in the evening, Monday to Friday. Students who get caught violating the EOP twice in a week receive two penalty points. The purpose of EOP is as follows:

English is only a tool to raise Korea to the highest level by accommodating diverse civilizations in accordance with Korean tradition. English Only Policy is merely a means, not an end in itself.

Teachers are also recommended to give their lectures in English.

==== Uniforms ====
During all classes and the Honjung practice, students are required to wear the school uniform. The most common uniform is the modernized hanbok, called saenghwalbok. Students wear this to most classes and are free to choose from up to a dozen different colors. There are seasonal variations for summer, winter, and spring/fall, varying in thickness, sleeve length, and fabric. All teachers wear hanbok too, freely chosen though.

During official school ceremonies such as the Morning Assembly, and Entrance/Graduation Ceremony, students are required to wear a formal, rather traditional uniform called yebok. There are two types of yebok, one for the summer season and one for the winter.

==== Honjung ====
Honjung (혼정, 昏定) is a traditional Korean practice during which scholars reflect on the day and pay gratitude to their parents. Honjung in KMLA is half an hour long in the evening ritualized in assembly dormitory rooms. Students direct their thanks to 'dorm parents', or dormitory supervisors, in proxy of their parents. Once the dorm parent finishes his or her moral discourse and announcement, all the students bow to the dormitory inspector. The afterward time is used to make announcements and to share celebratory events, like birthdays.

==== Minjok Peer Tutoring ====
Minjok peer tutoring is an effort in which students share their specific strengths with one another through one-on-one tutoring. The MPT program is designed to bring together students with strengths in different fields (math, science, humanities) to ensure a more rounded education of the entire student body. Students who wish to receive MPT register as "tutees" along with their desired subjects and the students who wish to teach register as "tutors" with their preferred subject to teach. Some students prearrange their lessons with their tutors, but for those who cannot, the MPT managers arrange the tutors and the tutees allowing efficient progress.

=== Education ===
==== School Year ====
Like other Korean high schools, the school year at KMLA officially begins in March and ends in February. Likewise, the official "entrance ceremony" of freshmen is in March, and the official "graduation ceremony" of seniors is in February. However, all students, including freshmen, are required to begin their first semester of the year in late January (During this month, sophomores and seniors attend classes, and freshmen go through an 'orientation' period where they get accustomed to the school), and seniors are allowed to leave the school in December.

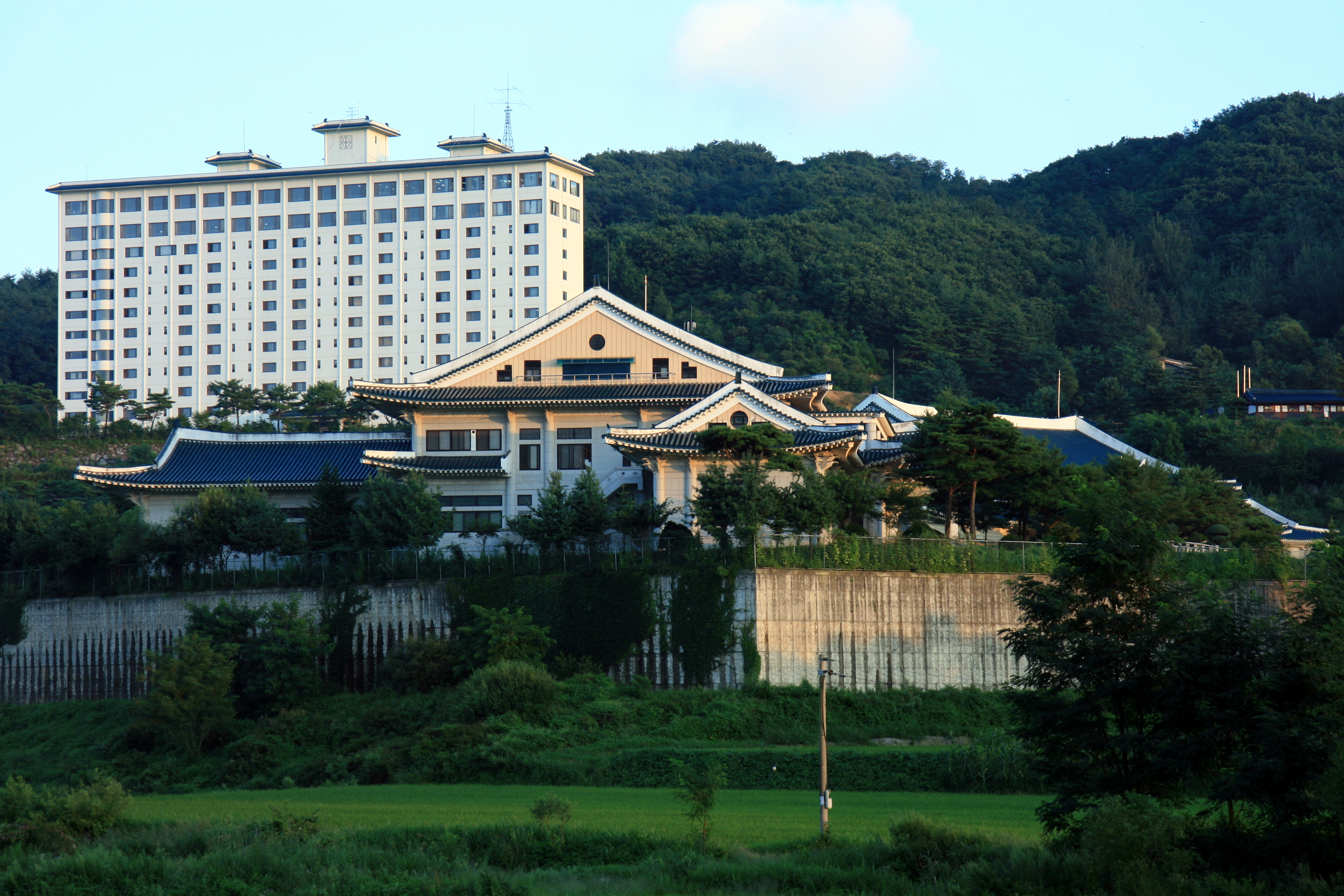
Sun sets over Dasan Hall and the student dormitory.

==== Classes ====
Every student in KMLA belongs to one of four fields – domestic humanities, domestic natural sciences, international humanities, and international natural sciences. The division between fields are not as strict as in other Korean schools; students are not admitted proportionate to each field, students are free to change fields every semester, and except for Korean Language Studies, English, and Mathematics, students are free to choose whatever class they wish to take.

Some examples of classes include:

- SAT classes, such as SAT Physics, SAT Chemistry, and SAT Biology
- AP classes, such as AP Physics, AP Chemistry, AP Biology, AP Macro/Micro Economics, AP US History, AP US Government and Politics, AP Psychology, AP European History, AP World History, AP Computer Science, AP Environmental Science, AP English Language/Literature, and AP Comparative Politics
- Classes that follow the Korean curriculum, such as Physics I/II, Chemistry I/II, Biology I/II, Earth Science I/II Korean History, Law and Politics(법과 정치), Ethics, Cultural Science(사회문화),
- Advanced Classes, such as Advanced Physics, Organic Chemistry, Cellular Biology, Molecular Biology, and Positive Psychology
- And Yunghap (interdisciplinary) classes.

=== Extracurricular Activities ===
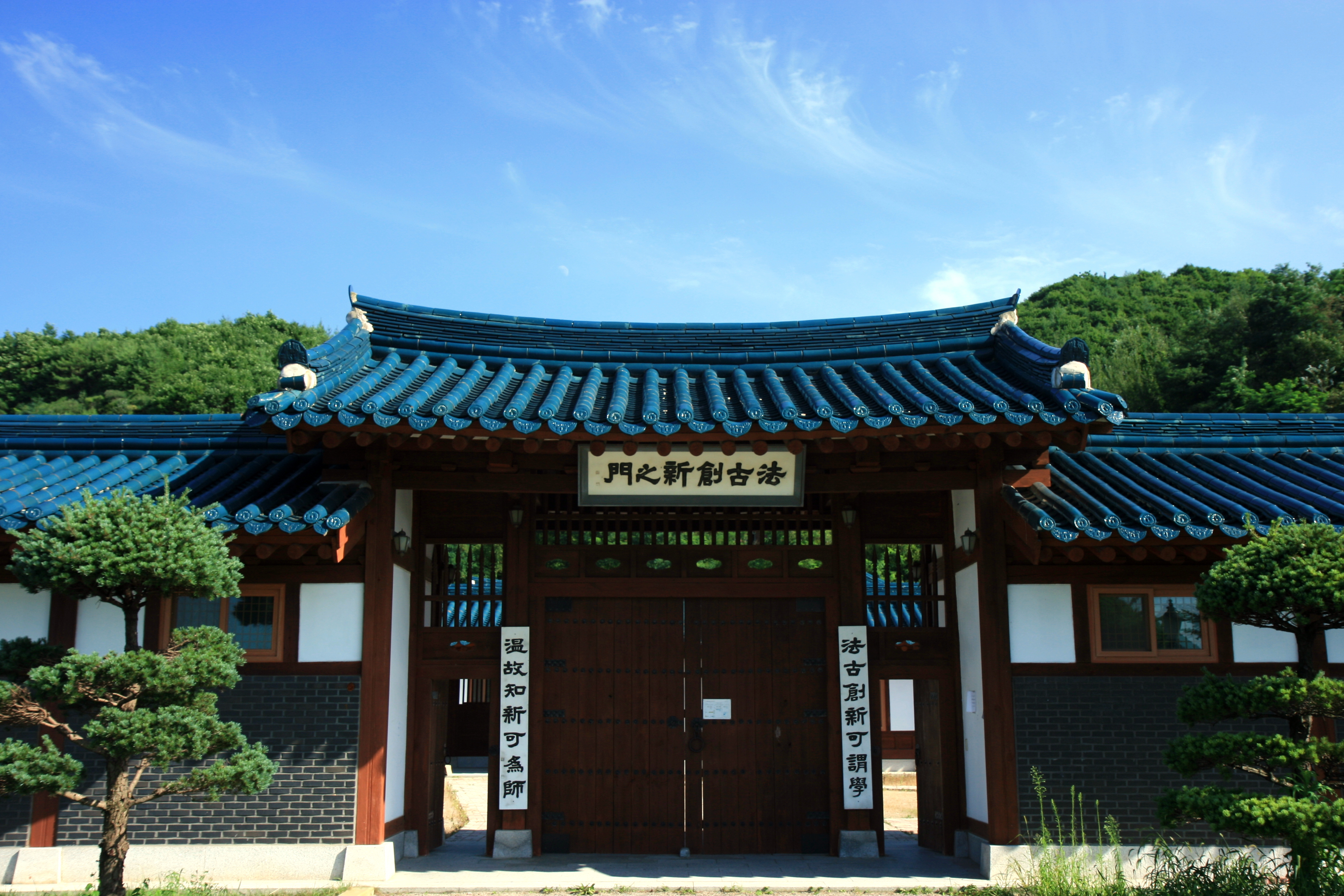
Minjok Culture Center houses the school's domestic preparatory program in Korean, music, and arts.

Hundreds of extracurricular activities are available at KMLA.

==== Student Clubs ====
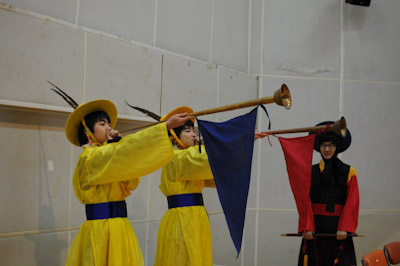
Daechita

There are many musical and dramatic groups at KMLA. The KMLA Orchestra is a symphonic group composed of more than sixty students. Daechita is a Korean ensemble that practices Korean royal music; they perform at the beginning of major school assemblies and other official functions. Musical theatre is performed by two groups: Stars on the Stage (closed as of 2020) and The Scene. The former puts on short performances at the annual school music concert, while the later performs full-length musical productions. Other musical groups include the Minjok Orchestra, the New Age of Ballad and Synergy ballad performance groups, rock clubs FITM and PLZ, a hip hop club Rhyme Factory, a samul nori group Samuchim, and a drama club Life is Drama.

Other student groups focus on arts and writing. Through the Lens is a photography club that hold exhibitions inside and outside of school. The Minjok Herald is and English-language school journal, and Bulhui is a Korean-language one. The Herald is a quarterly publication and a member of the National Scholastic Press Association.

The school participates in a variety of academic competitions. The mock trial won the 2010 Mock Trial Global competition held by Handong International Law School, and went on to defeat Team Australia at the second annual Korea-Australia Mock Trial Friendly Match. The English Debate Society won the 2009 European Schools Debating Championships (ESDC) tournament held in Stuttgart, Germany. In 2011, teams from EDS have won a number of tournaments in Korea, namely the National Schools Debating Championships (NSDC) as well as the Gwangju Youth Debating Championship.

Other clubs include a peer-counseling club Sock Sack Im, the school branch of Amnesty International, and economics club ECORUM, and astronomy club Apple Pie, and an environmental awareness club ENsiders.

==== Student Government ====
The purpose of the student council is to give students the opportunity to experience and take part in democracy during their school years. It leads students to develop creative leadership while experiencing both the tripartite political system and the duties as a representative. The student council consists of three main branches: executive, legislative, and judicial. There are fourteen departments that support and work with the three councils.

- Executive Council
- Legislative Council
- Judicial Council

The members of each council are elected every semester by popular vote. The Executive and Legislative Council consists of five members – one president and two vice presidents who are 11th graders, and two 10th grade members. The judicial branch consists of three members – one president, and two vice presidents. The 38nd student council was elected in September 2024.

The judicial branch manages the school court, where the students who violated the school regulation go every Thursday. The branch also tests the validness of the students' defending speeches, which if true can be excused from punishment. The number of penalty points the students receive from breaking the school regulation depends on the judicial branch's judgments. The judicial branch also cooperates with other two branches, the executive branch and legislative branch, to help amend problems in school regulations or systems.

The fifteen departments are: The Department of School Event Management, the Department of School Guidance, the Department of Food and Nutrition, the Department of Justice, the Department of Finance, the Department of Broadcasting, the Department of Library Management, the Department of Audit and Inspection, the Department of Public Information, the Department of EOP, the Department of School Environment, the Department of Education, the Department of School History, the Department of Physical Education, and the Department of Software and Technology.

=== School campus ===
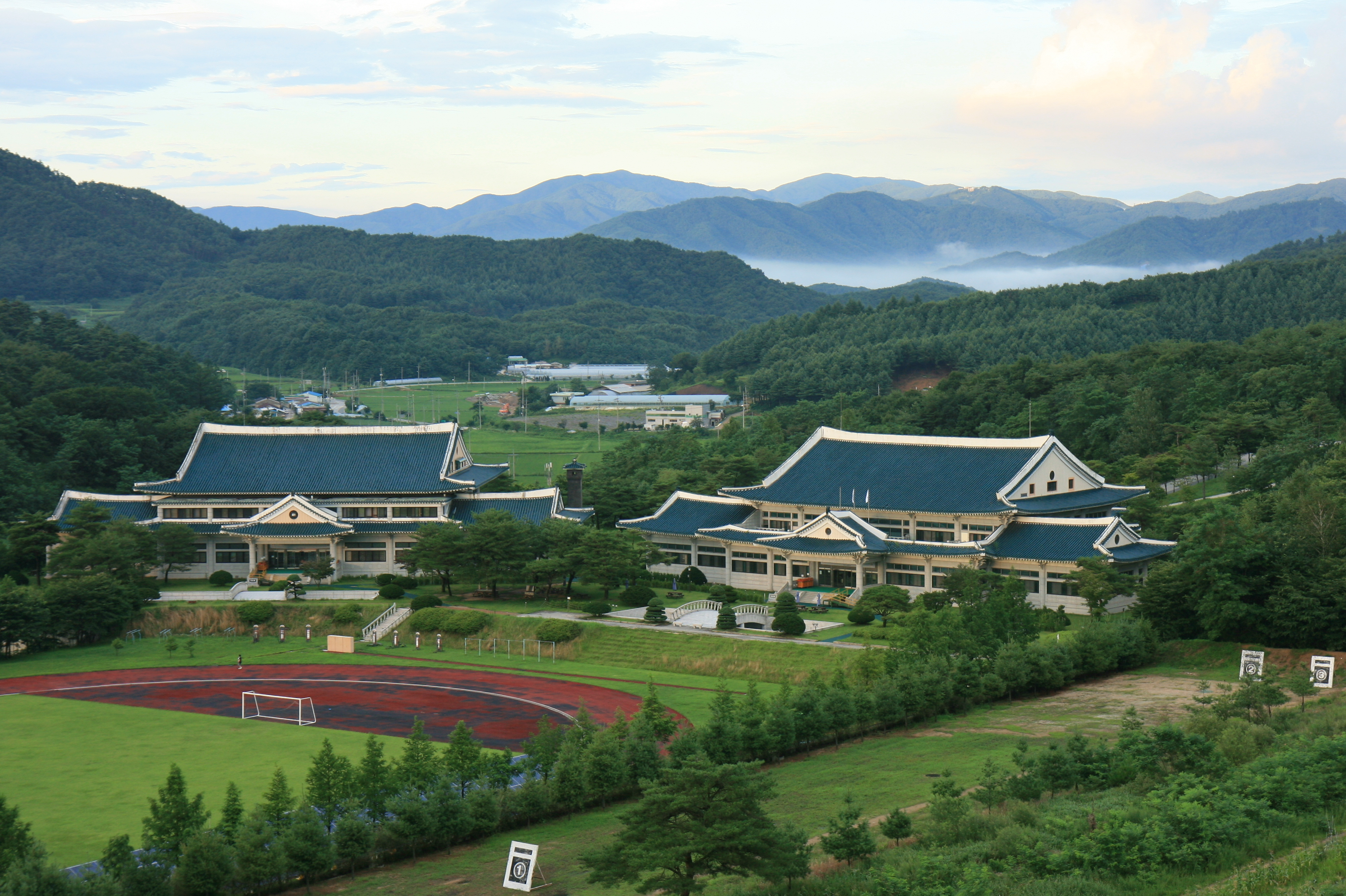
Dasan Hall (left) and Chungmu Hall (right).

- Dormitory: The dormitory is a 12-story building including student rooms, study hall, a cafeteria and bakery. 3 students share one room with individual beds and desks. Rooms are connected with a hallway and share a common bathroom.
- Minjok Cultural Center: Minjok Cultural Center is the center of Korean cultural education. Learning Korean traditions including Daegum, Gayageum, and Samul nori, students establish their identity as proud Koreans.

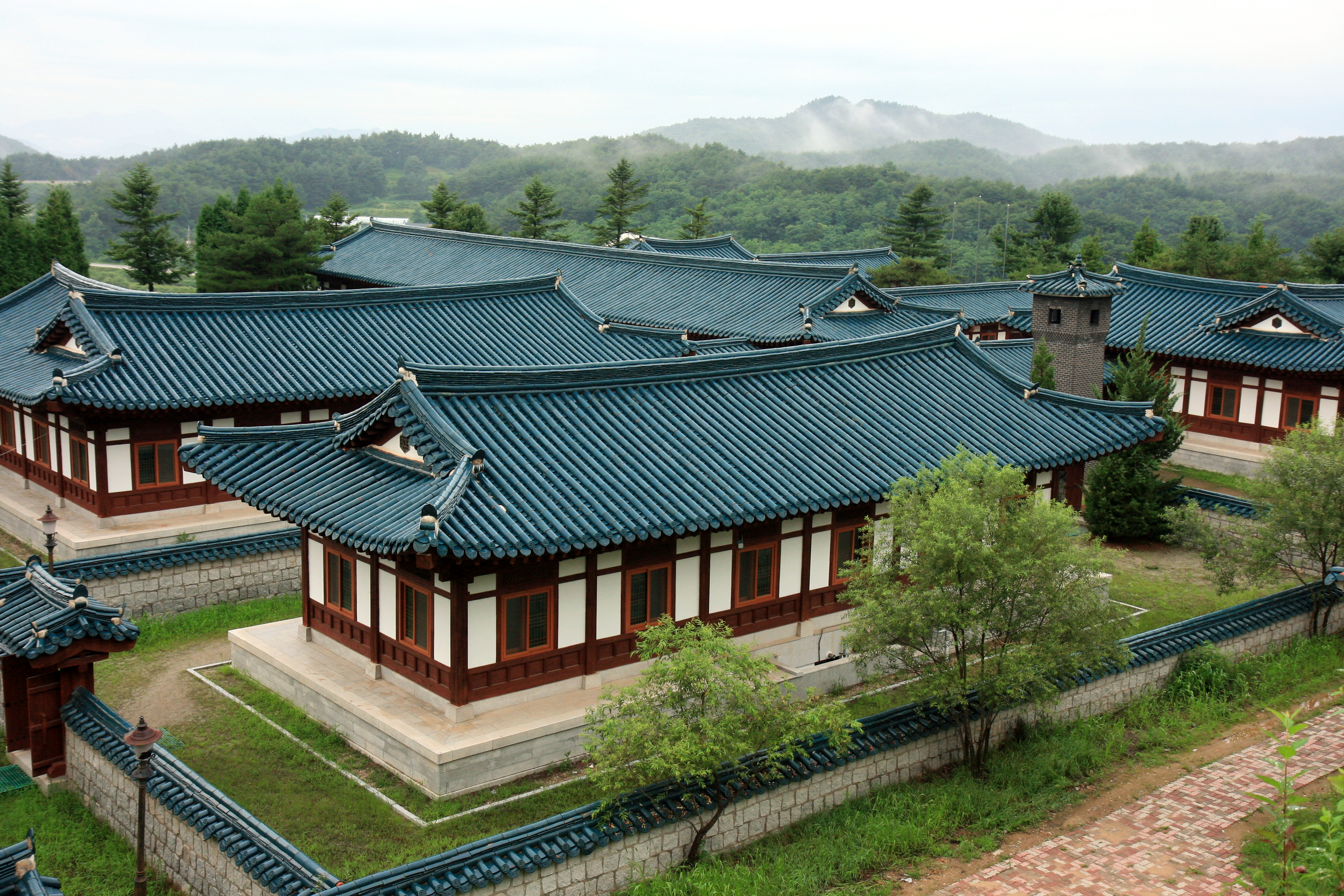
Elevated view of the Minjok Cultural Center.

- Education Building: Education Building consists of two buildings, which are Chungmu-building and Dasan-building (above two buildings being named in tribute to two prominent figures of Korean history). There are science labs, a library, auditorium, computer labs, recording studios and practice rooms, a dance studio, as well as the bulk of teachers' individual laboratories.

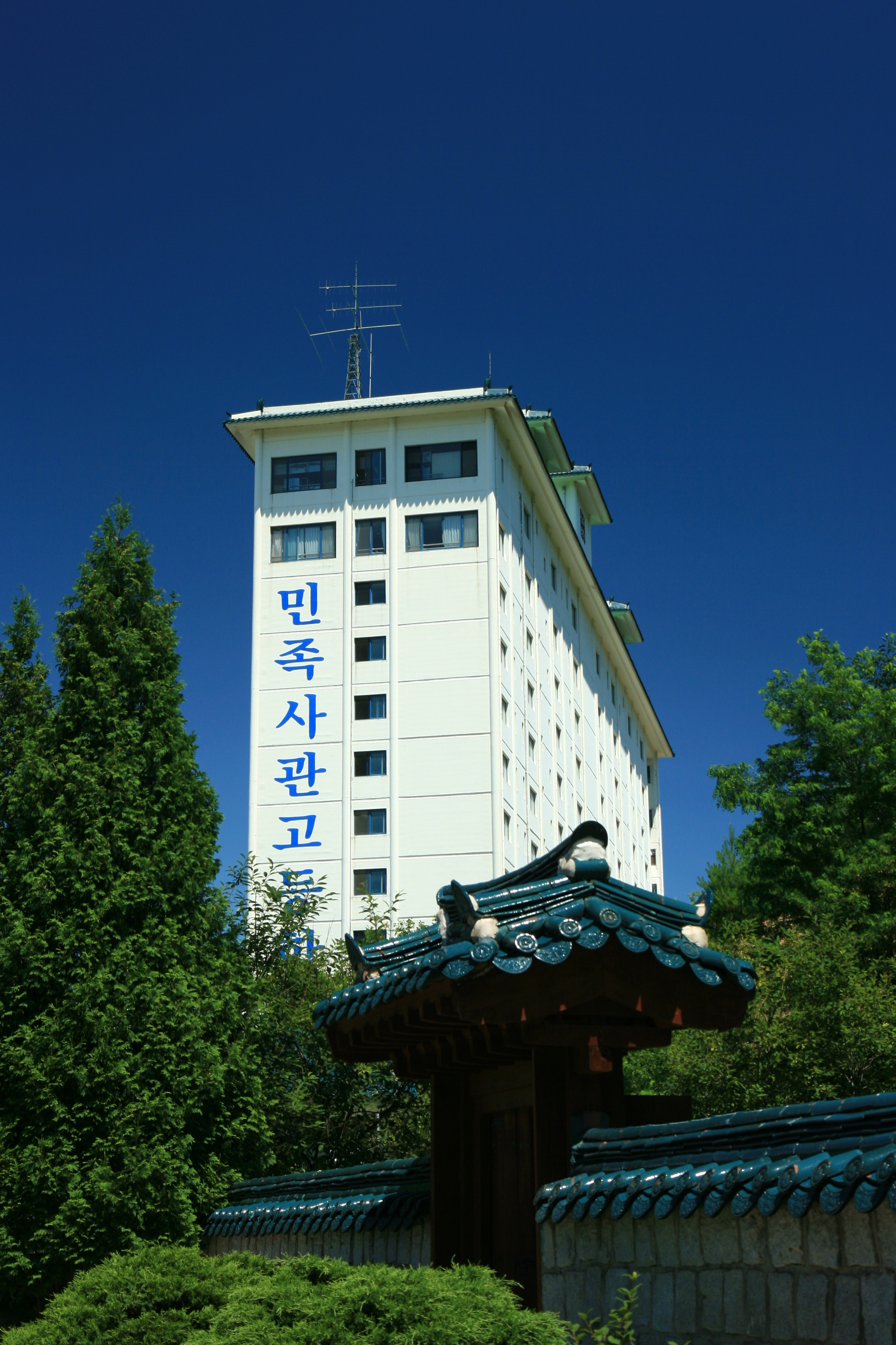
School dormitory.

- Gymnasium: Gymnasium is an indoor sports building with a gymnastics room in the basement. Such facilities allow students to enjoy many sports, despite the isolated location of KMLA, such as basketball, table tennis, Taekwondo, Kumdo, Volleyball, etc.
- Korean Archery Field :Practicing Korean traditional sports archery in this field, students train sound body and sound mind and pride for their nation.
- English Education Building Along with the English Only Policy, the English Education Building is solely devoted to English education. Many English teachers including several native speakers have laboratories in this building.
- Track Field : KMLA has a 400m track capable of international 2nd field and track event. Inside the track, there is a lawn soccer field with a few sprinklers. A tennis court and basketball court are located beside the track field.

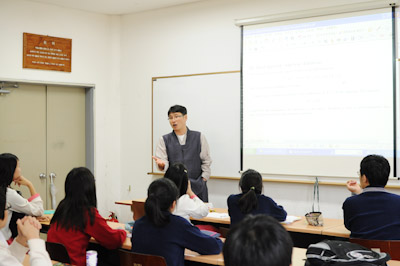
Typical class at KMLA

=== Athletics ===
Every morning, students participate in morning exercise from 6:30 to 7:00. 10th graders either participate in Kumdo and Taekwondo, and all KMLA students, by the end of their first year, is officially registered in the Korean Kumdo Association or the Korean Taekwondo Association as an athlete. 11th graders are given a more diverse set of choices, including volleyball, softball, and jogging.

Physical Education classes are mandatory for all three years. 10th graders learn Korean Archery and Golf for a semester each. 11th graders can choose from basketball, soccer, and dance sports. 12th graders may choose from volleyball or table tennis.

The school fields both boys' and girls' basketball teams. The boys' team, known as "Crossover", won the Gangwon State Championships in 2009, 2010, and the Gangwon State Club Basketball Championship in 2010 and 2023. The girls' team, known as "Game Over", is the five time running Gangwon State Champion.

Baseball, soft ball, and T-ball are also played. The school baseball team was known as the "KBO". In 2010, the team won gold at the Gangwon baseball championship. It has since changed its name to "KMLA Baseball". The soft ball and T-ball clubs are known as "Play ball". In 2014, the T-ball team ranked second place in Gangwon-do.

Students can also participate in sports clubs. The following is a list of a few:

- Badminton
- Baseball
- Basketball
- Fencing
- Flag Football
- Football (soccer)
- Golf
- Korean Archery
- Kumdo
- Softball
- Swimming
- Table Tennis
- Taekwondo
- Tennis
- Volleyball
- Lacrosse
