= Presidential committee on young generation =

The Presidential Committee on Young Generation (PCYG) is an advisory board on South Korean youth to the president of the Republic of Korea.

Established on July 13, 2013, PCYG is led by Minwoo Nam, head of the Korea Venture Business Association and CEO of DASAN Networks. PCYG advises the President on youth issues such as job creation, communication, and policy making. PCYG is headquartered in Seoul.

== Basis of the Establishment ==
Presidential decree on the establishment of the PCYG

== General ==
PCYG was formed to strengthen communications between the government and young people, making policy-making processes for them more effective. The government has defined this group as men and women between ages 19 to 39.

The major role of PCYG is to advise the president about policy-making on youth issues. Having ‘Field, People, and Collective Labour’ as its main theme for the operation, PCYG also takes a role as a mediator between the government departments throughout the policy-making processes related to youth issues.

== Organization ==
PCYG has two divisions; the committee board and the working group. The committee board consists of 24 members, including nineteen civilian and five governmental members. PCYG members include young leaders with wide experience in various fields, including young entrepreneurs, international volunteers and mentoring activities. The committee board has three sub-committees, whose titles are shown in the organizational structure on the right-hand side. The working group is divided into the two teams, ‘policy team’ and ‘communications team.’

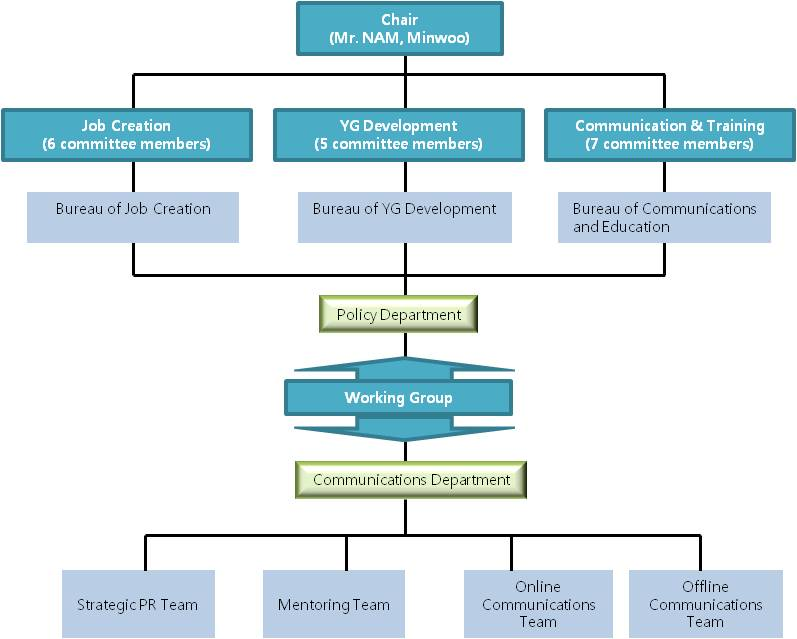
organizational structure of the PCYG

== Operative Functions ==
The PCYG functions in the following three areas;

1. Youth Job creation: discovering jobs in public/private sectors, building young generation-friendly business environment, sponsoring international job searching (K-Move)
2. Youth Policy Development: mediating YG policy fragmented throughout the government departments, supporting government projects related to the YG
3. Communications/nurturing the youth: online and offline communications, encouraging innovation, nurturing programs such as mentoring

=== Operation process ===
The PCYG collects youth voices in various fields and discusses the raised issues. It then gathers opinions from the government departments on the issues and mediates between them to report to the president. After the reports, it monitors policy practices executed by the departments and receives feedback from them.

== Address ==
Presidential Committee on Young Generation 12th floor, KT Building, Sejong-roh 100, Jongno-gu, Seoul.
