= Sneathiella chungangensis =

Scientific classification
- Domain: Bacteria
- Kingdom: Pseudomonadati
- Phylum: Pseudomonadota
- Class: Alphaproteobacteria
- Order: Sneathiellales
- Family: Sneathiellaceae
- Genus: Sneathiella
- Species: S. chungangensis

Binomial name
- Sneathiella chungangensis Siamphan et al. 2014

Type strain
- CECT 8513, KCTC 32476, CAU 1294

Genus of bacteria

Sneathiella chungangensis is a Gram-negative, strictly aerobic, non-spore-forming and motile bacterium from the genus of Sneathiella which has been isolated from marine sand.
