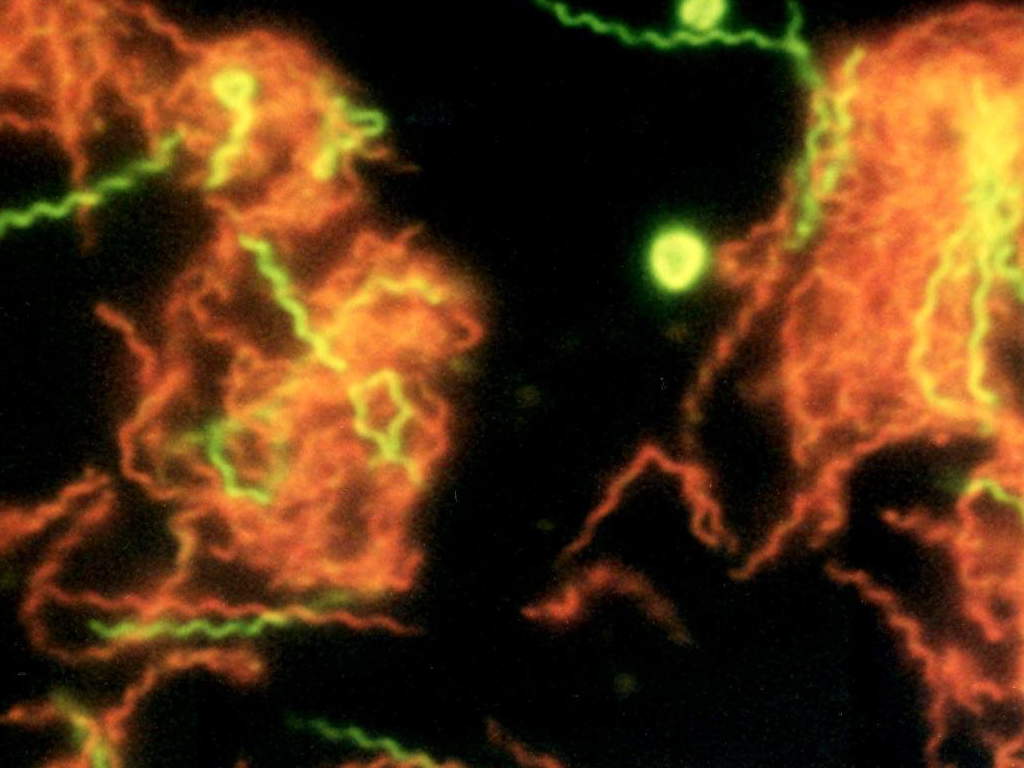

Scientific classification
- Domain: Bacteria
- Kingdom: Pseudomonadati
- Phylum: Spirochaetota
- Class: Spirochaetia
- Order: Spirochaetales
- Family: Spirochaetaceae
- Genus: Spirochaeta
- Species: S. americana

Binomial name
- Spirochaeta americana Hoover, Pikuta and Bej 2003

= Spirochaeta americana =

Species of bacterium

Spirochaeta americana is a single-celled extremophile. This haloalkaliphilic and obligately anaerobic bacterium can be found in the highly alkaline, salty, deep waters of California's Mono Lake.

== Physical characteristics ==
S. americana has long helically coiled cells, is gram-negative, and is chemotrophic in its metabolism. Spirochaeta also have unique flagella, sometimes called axial filaments, which run lengthwise between the cytoplasmic membrane and outer membrane. These cause a twisting motion which allows the spirochaete to move about. Despite the extreme environment that they require, "their cell walls are very delicate, and it is difficult to keep them alive for long periods in the laboratory," says Dr. Elena Pikuta, one of the discoverers of S. americana.

== Environment ==
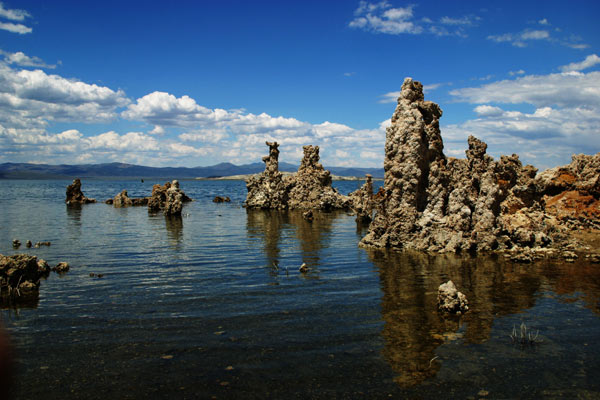
Mono Lake, showing tufa (calcium deposits).

S. americana thrives in the lake-bottom mud of Lake Mono, a 13 mile wide former monomictic volcanic basin which is fed by numerous small Sierra streams and which has no outflow except evaporation and Californian aqueducts, thereby continually increasing the concentration of salts and other minerals in its waters. Further mineral enrichment of these waters also occur due to the volcanically active area, such as when Negit Island erupted roughly 250 years ago.

Surviving in deep, salty, alkaline lake mud of Lake Mono, the extreme conditions in which S. americana thrive have prompted its discoverers to explore Antarctica's Lake Untersee, hopefully to discover similar species.

== Reproduction ==
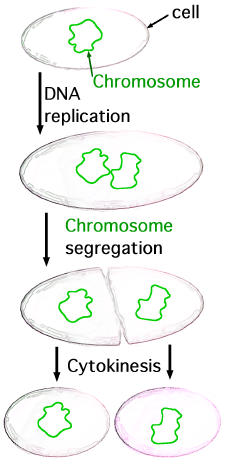
Diagram of bacterial binary fission.

S. americana reproduces via transverse binary fission, where the cytoplasm divides transversely between two sets of DNA genomes, forming two dissimilar individuals, as do other Spirochaeta.

== Growth and metabolism ==
This bacterium grows in environments of 10 to 44 degrees Celsius with optimal growth at 37 degrees and prefers a pH balance of 9.5, similar to that of baking soda, hand soap, or a solution of household bleach in water.

S. americana is capable of metabolizing D-glucose, fructose, maltose, sucrose, starch and D-mannitol and has as its waste H_{2}, acetate, ethanol and formate.
