= Sneathiella glossodoripedis =

Scientific classification
- Domain: Bacteria
- Kingdom: Pseudomonadati
- Phylum: Pseudomonadota
- Class: Alphaproteobacteria
- Order: Sneathiellales
- Family: Sneathiellaceae
- Genus: Sneathiella
- Species: S. glossodoripedis

Binomial name
- Sneathiella glossodoripedis Kurahashi et al. 2008

Type strain
- IAM 15419, JCM 23214, KCTC 12842, strain MKT133

Synonyms
- Iambacter cinctapus

Genus of bacteria

Sneathiella glossodoripedis is a Gram-negative, mesophilic, strictly aerobic, rod-shaped and motile bacterium from the genus of Sneathiella which has been isolated from the sea slug Glossodoris cincta.
