= Sneathiella chinensis =

Scientific classification
- Domain: Bacteria
- Kingdom: Pseudomonadati
- Phylum: Pseudomonadota
- Class: Alphaproteobacteria
- Order: Sneathiellales
- Family: Sneathiellaceae
- Genus: Sneathiella
- Species: S. chinensis

Binomial name
- Sneathiella chinensis Jordan et al. 2007

Type strain
- CBMAI 737, LMG 23452, NBRC 103408

Genus of bacteria

Sneathiella chinensis is a Gram-negative, aerobic, non-spore-forming, chemoheterotrophic, halotolerant and motile bacterium from the genus of Sneathiella which has been isolated from coastal sediments from Qingdao in China.
