= Mesonia hippocampi =

Scientific classification
- Domain: Bacteria
- Kingdom: Pseudomonadati
- Phylum: Bacteroidota
- Class: Flavobacteriia
- Order: Flavobacteriales
- Family: Flavobacteriaceae
- Genus: Mesonia
- Species: M. hippocampi

Binomial name
- Mesonia hippocampi Kolberg et al. 2015

Type strain
- 96_Hippo_TS_3/13

Species of bacterium

Mesonia hippocampi is a Gram-negative and rod-shaped bacterium from the genus of Mesonia which has been isolated from the brood pouch of an ill seahorse (Hippocampus barbouri).
