= Zunongwangia endophytica =

Scientific classification
- Domain: Bacteria
- Kingdom: Pseudomonadati
- Phylum: Bacteroidota
- Class: Flavobacteriia
- Order: Flavobacteriales
- Family: Flavobacteriaceae
- Genus: Zunongwangia
- Species: Z. endophytica

Binomial name
- Zunongwangia endophytica Fidalgo et al. 2017

Type strain
- CPA58

Bacterium

Zunongwangia endophytica is a Gram-negative and rod-shaped bacterium from the genus of Zunongwangia which has been isolated from the plant Halimione portulacoides from Ria de Aveiro in Portugal.
