= Kotze =

Kotze or the accented Kotzé is an Afrikaans surname and may refer to:

== Kotze ==
- Alta Kotze (born 1971), South African cricketer
- Johannes Kotze (1879–1931), South African cricketer

== Kotzé ==
- Björn Kotzé (born 1978), Namibian cricketer
- Deon Kotzé (born 1973), Namibian cricketer
- Elize Kotze, former head coach of the South Africa national netball team
- John Gilbert Kotzé (1849–1940), South African jurist
- Theuns Kotzé (born 1987), Namibian rugby union player

== See also ==
- Coetzee
