= Mesonia aquimarina =

Scientific classification
- Domain: Bacteria
- Kingdom: Pseudomonadati
- Phylum: Bacteroidota
- Class: Flavobacteriia
- Order: Flavobacteriales
- Family: Flavobacteriaceae
- Genus: Mesonia
- Species: M. aquimarina

Binomial name
- Mesonia aquimarina Choi et al. 2015

Type strain
- IMCC1021

Bacterium

Mesonia aquimarina is a Gram-negative, aerobic and rod-shaped bacterium from the genus of Mesonia which has been isolated from the coast of the Sea of Japan.
