= Mesonia mobilis =

Scientific classification
- Domain: Bacteria
- Kingdom: Pseudomonadati
- Phylum: Bacteroidota
- Class: Flavobacteriia
- Order: Flavobacteriales
- Family: Flavobacteriaceae
- Genus: Mesonia
- Species: M. mobilis

Binomial name
- Mesonia mobilis Nedashkovskaya et al. 2006

Type strain
- KMM 6059

Bacterium

Mesonia mobilis is a Gram-negative, strictly aerobic, heterotrophic, chemoorganotrophic and motile bacterium from the genus of Mesonia which has been isolated from seawater.
