= Hollandina pterotermitidis =

Scientific classification
- Domain: Bacteria
- Kingdom: Pseudomonadati
- Phylum: Spirochaetota
- Class: Spirochaetia
- Order: Spirochaetales
- Family: Spirochaetaceae
- Genus: Hollandina
- Species: H. pterotermitidis

Binomial name
- Hollandina pterotermitidis Bermudes et al. 1988

Species of bacterium

Hollandina pterotermitidis is a species of spirochete that is symbiotic in wood-eating cockroaches and termites, and is the type species of its genus.
