= Mesonia oceanica =

Scientific classification
- Domain: Bacteria
- Kingdom: Pseudomonadati
- Phylum: Bacteroidota
- Class: Flavobacteriia
- Order: Flavobacteriales
- Family: Flavobacteriaceae
- Genus: Mesonia
- Species: M. oceanica

Binomial name
- Mesonia oceanica Lucena et al. 2020

Type strain
- ISS653

Bacterium

Mesonia oceanica is a Gram-negative, aerobic, rod-shaped, chemoorganotrophic, slightly halophilic and non-motile bacterium from the genus of Mesonia which has been isolated from seawater from the Atlantic Ocean.
