= Euzebya tangerina =

Scientific classification
- Domain: Bacteria
- Kingdom: Bacillati
- Phylum: Actinomycetota
- Class: Nitriliruptoria
- Order: Euzebyales
- Family: Euzebyaceae
- Genus: Euzebya
- Species: E. tangerina

Binomial name
- Euzebya tangerina Kurahashi et al. 2010

Type strain
- KCTC 19736, NBRC 105439, F10

Synonyms
- Euzebia tangerinus [sic]

Species of bacterium

Euzebya tangerina is a Gram-positive bacterium from the genus Euzebya which has been isolated from the sea cucumber Holothuria edulis from the coast of Japan.
