= Zunongwangia flava =

Scientific classification
- Domain: Bacteria
- Kingdom: Pseudomonadati
- Phylum: Bacteroidota
- Class: Flavobacteriia
- Order: Flavobacteriales
- Family: Flavobacteriaceae
- Genus: Zunongwangia
- Species: Z. flava

Binomial name
- Zunongwangia flava Cho et al. 2018

Type strain
- MBLN094

Bacterium

Zunongwangia flava is a Gram-negative, rod-shaped, aerobic and non-spore-forming bacterium from the genus of Zunongwangia which has been isolated from the plant Salicornia europaea from the coast of the Yellow Sea.
