= Zunongwangia mangrovi =

Scientific classification
- Domain: Bacteria
- Kingdom: Pseudomonadati
- Phylum: Bacteroidota
- Class: Flavobacteriia
- Order: Flavobacteriales
- Family: Flavobacteriaceae
- Genus: Zunongwangia
- Species: Z. mangrovi

Binomial name
- Zunongwangia mangrovi Rameshkumar et al. 2014

Type strain
- P2E16

Bacterium

Zunongwangia mangrovi is a Gram-negative, rod-shaped, strictly aerobic, slightly halophilic and non-motile bacterium from the genus of Zunongwangia which has been isolated from the mangrove Avicennia marina from Tamil Nadu.
