= Diplocalyx =

Scientific classification
- Domain: Bacteria
- Kingdom: Pseudomonadati
- Phylum: Spirochaetota
- Class: Spirochaetia
- Order: Spirochaetales
- Family: Spirochaetaceae
- Genus: Diplocalyx; Gharagozlou 1968 ex Bermudes et al. 1988

Type species
- Diplocalyx calotermitidis Gharagozlou 1968 ex Bermudes et al. 1988

Species
- D. calotermitidis; "D. cryptotermitidis"

Genus of bacteria

Diplocalyx is a genus of bacteria of the spirochete phylum. The genus was originally established in 1968 on the basis of differential morphology when compared to other spirochete species. No species within it has been successfully grown in culture. Up to now there is only on species of this genus known (Diplocalyx calotermitidis).

== See also ==
- List of bacterial orders
- List of bacteria genera
