= Mesonia maritimus =

Scientific classification
- Domain: Bacteria
- Kingdom: Pseudomonadati
- Phylum: Bacteroidota
- Class: Flavobacteriia
- Order: Flavobacteriales
- Family: Flavobacteriaceae
- Genus: Mesonia
- Species: M. maritima

Binomial name
- Mesonia maritima Sung et al. 2017

Type strain
- 15-S14-6

Bacterium

Mesonia maritima is a Gram-negative, aerobic and rod-shaped bacterium from the genus of Mesonia which has been isolated from seawater from the South Sea.
