= Mesonia ostreae =

Scientific classification
- Domain: Bacteria
- Kingdom: Pseudomonadati
- Phylum: Bacteroidota
- Class: Flavobacteriia
- Order: Flavobacteriales
- Family: Flavobacteriaceae
- Genus: Mesonia
- Species: M. ostreae

Binomial name
- Mesonia ostreae Lee et al. 2012

Type strain
- T-y2

Bacterium

Mesonia ostreae is a Gram-negative and aerobic bacterium from the genus of Mesonia which has been isolated from seawater from an oyster farm from the South Sea.
