= Mesonia sediminis =

Scientific classification
- Domain: Bacteria
- Kingdom: Pseudomonadati
- Phylum: Bacteroidota
- Class: Flavobacteriia
- Order: Flavobacteriales
- Family: Flavobacteriaceae
- Genus: Mesonia
- Species: M. sediminis

Binomial name
- Mesonia sediminis Wang et al. 2016

Type strain
- MF326

Synonyms
- Mesonia curtobacteria

Bacterium

Mesonia sediminis is a Gram-negative and facultatively anaerobic bacterium from the genus of Mesonia which has been isolated from sediments from a pond which was cultivated with sea cucumber from Rongcheng in China.
