= Zavarzinia compransoris =

Scientific classification
- Domain: Bacteria
- Kingdom: Pseudomonadati
- Phylum: Pseudomonadota
- Class: Alphaproteobacteria
- Order: Rhodospirillales
- Family: Zavarziniaceae
- Genus: Zavarzinia
- Species: Z. compransoris

Binomial name
- Zavarzinia compransoris (ex Nozhevnikova and Zavarzin 1974); Meyer et al. 1994

Synonyms
- Comamonas compransoris Nozhevnikova and Zavarzin 1974; Pseudomonas compransoris (Nozhevnikova and Zavarzin 1974) Cypionka et al. 1980

Species of bacterium

Zavarzinia compransoris is a species of Gram-negative soil bacterium in the genus Zavarzinia. It is motile by using a polar flagellum. The cells are curved rod-shaped.
