= Gillisia myxillae =

Scientific classification
- Domain: Bacteria
- Kingdom: Pseudomonadati
- Phylum: Bacteroidota
- Class: Flavobacteriia
- Order: Flavobacteriales
- Family: Flavobacteriaceae
- Genus: Gillisia
- Species: G. myxillae

Binomial name
- Gillisia myxillae Lee et al. 2006

Type strain
- UST050418-085

Bacterium

Gillisia myxillae is a Gram-negative, rod-shaped and strictly aerobic bacterium from the genus of Gillisia which has been isolated from the sponge Myxilla incrustans from Friday Harbor in the United States.
