= Spirochaeta thermophila =

Scientific classification
- Domain: Bacteria
- Kingdom: Pseudomonadati
- Phylum: Spirochaetota
- Class: Spirochaetia
- Order: Spirochaetales
- Family: Spirochaetaceae
- Genus: Spirochaeta
- Species: S. thermophila

Binomial name
- Spirochaeta thermophila Aksenova 1992

Species of bacterium

Spirochaeta thermophila is a fairly recently discovered free-living, anaerobic, spirochaete that seems to be the most thermophilic of the Spirochaetales order. The type species was discovered in 1992 in Kuril islands, Russia and described in Aksenova, et al. It has been isolated in the sediments and water columns of brackish aquatic habitats of various ponds, lakes, rivers, and oceans. This organism is identified as a new species based on its unique ability to degrade cellulose, xylan, and other α- and β-linked sugars and use them as the sole carbon source by encoding many glycoside hydrolases. It is presumed to secrete cellulases to break down plant-matter around it but there has been little work on the characterization of the enzymes responsible for this.

== Original description ==
The original description depicts single, helical, .2-.25 μm by 16-50 μm Gram-negative cells. The temperature range for survival of Spirochaeta thermophila is between 40° and 73° C with an optimum range between 66° and 68 °C. The pH range for survival was measured from 5.9 to 7.7 with an optimum of 7.5. The G + C content measured was approximately 52% in the 1992 description but has been measured around 70% since that time. The original description also noted that organisms of the same species isolated from different environments could have different optimum temperatures, optimum pH for growth, and optimum saline concentrations; these would change based on the environment in which the organism is living.

== Glucose fermentation pathway ==
The fermentation process is the same Embden-Meyerhof-Parnas pathway of glycolysis with the exception of one step. The phosphorylation of fructose-6-phosphate mediates the production of pyrophosphate-dependent (PPi-dependent) phosphofrucktokinase instead of the usual ATP-dependent phosphofrucktokinase. This appears to be a characteristic of Spirochaeta thermophila not found in other Spirochaeta species. It is suggested that this different product could be a regulatory mechanism for catabolic processes; with low levels of the ATP-dependent molecule, AMP is produced. AMP drives the production of PPi production for the step that is changed in the glycolysis pathway.

The PPi-dependent phosphofrucktokinase sequences are only available from three organisms in the Spirochaetales order: Spirochaeta thermophila, Borrelia burgdorferi, and Treponema pallidum. Comparing the sequences, in a 2001 study by Rominus et al., it was determined that S. thermophila was most closely related to T. pallidum for this sequence and the sister to those groups was B. burgedorferi. This analysis showed the thermophily of S. thermophila and T. pallidum arose from a common ancestor between them and B. burgdorferi that was a mesophile. This was an interesting revelation because it was previously assumed that the thermophilic, free-living spirochaetes gave rise to all extant spirochaetes.
