= Zunongwangia atlantica =

Scientific classification
- Domain: Bacteria
- Kingdom: Pseudomonadati
- Phylum: Bacteroidota
- Class: Flavobacteriia
- Order: Flavobacteriales
- Family: Flavobacteriaceae
- Genus: Zunongwangia
- Species: Z. atlantica

Binomial name
- Zunongwangia atlantica Shao et al. 2014

Type strain
- 22II14-10F7

Bacterium

Zunongwangia atlantica is a Gram-negative and rod-shaped bacterium from the genus of Zunongwangia which has been isolated from the deep-sea water from the Atlantic Ocean. Z. atlantica is catalase and oxidase positive. The species ferments glucose and is capable of hydrolyzing tween-20. β-galactocidase is produced by the bacterium.
