= Gillisia hiemivivida =

Scientific classification
- Domain: Bacteria
- Kingdom: Pseudomonadati
- Phylum: Bacteroidota
- Class: Flavobacteriia
- Order: Flavobacteriales
- Family: Flavobacteriaceae
- Genus: Gillisia
- Species: G. hiemivivida

Binomial name
- Gillisia hiemivivida Bowman and Nichols 2005

Bacterium

Gillisia hiemivivida is a bacterium from the genus of Gillisia.
