= Mesonia algae =

Scientific classification
- Domain: Bacteria
- Kingdom: Pseudomonadati
- Phylum: Bacteroidota
- Class: Flavobacteriia
- Order: Flavobacteriales
- Family: Flavobacteriaceae
- Genus: Mesonia
- Species: M. algae

Binomial name
- Mesonia algae Nedashkovskaya et al. 2003

Bacterium

Mesonia algae is a Gram-negative, aerobic, moderately halophilic, heterotrophic and non-motile bacterium from the genus of Mesonia which has been isolated from the alga Acrosiphonia sonderi.
