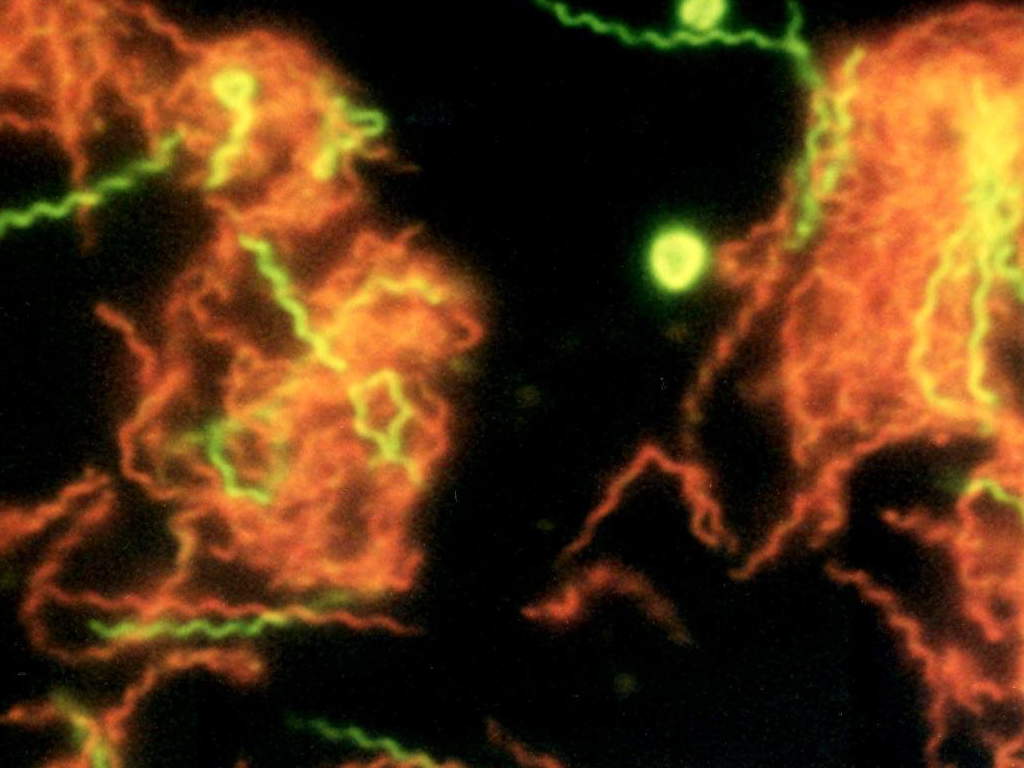
- A microscopic photograph of fluorescent-stained Spirochaeta americana

Scientific classification
- Domain: Bacteria
- Kingdom: Pseudomonadati
- Phylum: Spirochaetota
- Class: Spirochaetia
- Order: Spirochaetales
- Family: Spirochaetaceae; Swellengrebel 1907 (Approved Lists 1980)

Genera
- "Ca. Allospironema"; "Canaleparolina"; Clevelandina; Diplocalyx; "Ca. Haliotispira"; Hollandina; "Mobilifilum"; Pillotina; Rarispira; Spirochaeta; "Ca. Thalassospirochaeta"

Synonyms
- "Microspirochaetaceae" Gieszezykiewiez 1939; "Pillotinaceae" Margulis and Hinkle 1992; "Spirochaetidae" Enderlein 1917

= Spirochaetaceae =

Family of bacteria

The Spirochaetaceae are a family of spirochete bacteria. Some species within this family are known to have been causes for syphilis, Lyme disease, relapsing fever, and other illnesses.

== Phylogeny ==
The currently accepted taxonomy is based on the List of Prokaryotic names with Standing in Nomenclature (LPSN) and National Center for Biotechnology Information (NCBI).

16S rRNA based LTP_10_2024

- - Winmispira thermophila (Aksenova et al. 1992) Podosokorskaya et al. 2025
  - - - - Salinispiraceae
          - Spirochaeta lutea Shivani et al. 2015
          - Salinispira
        - Spirochaetaceae
          Spirochaeta Ehrenberg 1835
      - - Alkalispirochaetaceae
          - Spirochaeta halophila Greenberg & Canale-Parola 1977
          - Alkalispirochaeta
    - - Spirochaeta aurantia Vinzent 1926 ex Canale-Parola 1980
      - - - "Thiospirochaetaceae"
            - Spirochaeta cellobiosiphila Breznak & Warnecke 2008
            - - Oceanispirochaeta
              - - Thiospirochaeta
                - - Spirochaeta species‑group 2
                    - Spirochaeta isovalerica Harwood & Canale-Parola 1983
                    - Spirochaeta psychrophila Miyazaki et al. 2014
        - - "Entomospiraceae"
          - Borreliaceae

120 marker proteins based GTDB 10-RS226

- - - SP‑2023
      - SP-2023
      - "Ca. Haliotispira"
  - - - "Entomospirales"
        "Entomospiraceae"
    - - - Spirochaetales_E
          - - "Thiospirochaetaceae"
              Thiospirochaeta
          - - DSM‑2461
              Spirochaeta isovalerica
            - Spirochaetaceae_B
              Oceanispirochaeta
      - - - DSM‑17781
            - DSM‑17781
              Spirochaeta cellobiosiphila
        - - - Winmispirales
              - Winmispiraceae
                Winmispira thermophila
            - "Salinispirales"
              - - Alkalispirochaetaceae
                  Alkalispirochaeta
              - - DSM‑8902
                  Spirochaeta africana
                - Salinispiraceae
                  - Spirochaeta lutea
                  - Salinispira
          - - - "Sediminispirochaetales"
              - - "Ca. Thalassospirochaeta" {UBA9216: UBA9216}
                - "Marispirochaetales"
            - - Sphaerochaetales
              - Treponematales

== See also ==
- Hollandina pterotermitidis
- Pillotina calotermitidis
