= Gillisia illustrilutea =

Scientific classification
- Domain: Bacteria
- Kingdom: Pseudomonadati
- Phylum: Bacteroidota
- Class: Flavobacteriia
- Order: Flavobacteriales
- Family: Flavobacteriaceae
- Genus: Gillisia
- Species: G. illustrilutea

Binomial name
- Gillisia illustrilutea Bowman and Nichols 2005

Synonyms
- Gillisia ilustrilutea

Bacterium

Gillisia illustrilutea is a bacterium from the genus of Gillisia.
