= Mesonia phycicola =

Scientific classification
- Domain: Bacteria
- Kingdom: Pseudomonadati
- Phylum: Bacteroidota
- Class: Flavobacteriia
- Order: Flavobacteriales
- Family: Flavobacteriaceae
- Genus: Mesonia
- Species: M. phycicola

Binomial name
- Mesonia phycicola Kang and Lee 2010

Type strain
- MDSW-25

Synonyms
- Mesonia phycicolae

Bacterium

Mesonia phycicola is a Gram-negative, aerobic and non-motile bacterium from the genus of Mesonia which has been isolated from seaweed near Mara Island.
