= Zunongwangia profunda =

Scientific classification
- Domain: Bacteria
- Kingdom: Pseudomonadati
- Phylum: Bacteroidota
- Class: Flavobacteriia
- Order: Flavobacteriales
- Family: Flavobacteriaceae
- Genus: Zunongwangia
- Species: Z. profunda

Binomial name
- Zunongwangia profunda Qin et al. 2007

Synonyms
- Wangia okinawensis

Bacterium

Zunongwangia profunda is a Gram-negative and aerobic bacterium from the genus of Zunongwangia. The species was isolated from the deep sea.
