= Zavarzinia =

Scientific classification
- Domain: Bacteria
- Kingdom: Pseudomonadati
- Phylum: Pseudomonadota
- Class: Alphaproteobacteria
- Order: Rhodospirillales
- Family: Zavarziniaceae; Hördt et al. 2020
- Genus: Zavarzinia; Meyer et al. 1994

Type species
- Zavarzinia compransoris (ex Nozhevnikova and Zavarzin 1974); Meyer et al. 1994

Species
- Zavarzinia aquatilis; Zavarzinia compransoris; Zavarzinia marina

Genus of bacteria

Zavarzinia is a genus of Gram-negative soil bacteria in the order Rhodospirillales. It is the only genus in the family Zavarziniaceae. It is named after the Russian microbiologist Georgi Alexandrovich Zavarzin. Zavarzinia is motile by using a polar flagellum. The cells are curved rod-shaped.

Species:

- Zavarzinia aquatilis Lee et al. 2019
- Zavarzinia compransoris (ex Nozhevnikova and Zavarzin 1974) Meyer et al. 1994
- Zavarzinia marina Hu et al. 2022
