= Leisingera =

Scientific classification
- Domain: Bacteria
- Kingdom: Pseudomonadati
- Phylum: Pseudomonadota
- Class: Alphaproteobacteria
- Order: Rhodobacterales
- Family: Rhodobacteraceae
- Genus: Leisingera; Schaefer et al. 2002 emend. Martens et al. 2006

Species
- Leisingera methylohalidivorans

Genus of bacteria

Leisingera is a genus of bacteria in the family Rhodobacteraceae.
