= Gillisia =

Scientific classification
- Domain: Bacteria
- Kingdom: Pseudomonadati
- Phylum: Bacteroidota
- Class: Flavobacteriia
- Order: Flavobacteriales
- Family: Flavobacteriaceae
- Genus: Gillisia; Van Trappen et al. 2004

Species
- G. hiemivivida G. illustrilutea G. limnaea G. marina G. mitskevichiae G. myxillae G. sandarakina

Bacterium

Gillisia is a Gram-negative and strictly aerobic genus of bacteria from the family of Flavobacteriaceae. Gillisia is named after the Belgian bacteriologist Monique Gillis.
