= Clevelandina =

Scientific classification
- Domain: Bacteria
- Kingdom: Pseudomonadati
- Phylum: Spirochaetota
- Class: Spirochaetia
- Order: Spirochaetales
- Family: Spirochaetaceae
- Genus: Clevelandina; Bermudes et al. 1988
- Species: C. reticulitermitidis

Binomial name
- Clevelandina reticulitermitidis Bermudes et al. 1988

Species of bacterium

Clevelandina reticulitermitidis is a species of spirochete that is symbiotic in wood-eating cockroaches and termites. It is the only species in the genus Clevelandina.
