= James Mackay Shewan =

Scottish chemist, bacteriologist, and historian

James Mackay Shewan LLD FSA Scot FRSE FRSC FIBiol CBiol FIFST
- Born: 6 December 1909; Kirkhill, Invernessshire, Scotland
- Died: 23 June 1988 (aged 78)
- Education: Central Secondary School, Aberdeen; Aberdeen University (BSc,PhD)
- Occupations: chemist, bacteriologist and amateur historian
- Known for: Head of the Torry Research Station near Aberdeen
- Notable work: see Publications
- Parents: James Mackay Shewan (father); Jane Ridland (mother)
- Awards: Fellow of the Royal Society of Edinburgh

Dr James Mackay Shewan LLD FSA Scot FRSE FRSC FIBiol CBiol FIFST (1909–1988) was a 20th-century Scottish chemist, bacteriologist and amateur historian. He was Head of the Torry Research Station near Aberdeen.

== Life ==
He was born on 6 December 1909 in Kirkhill, Invernessshire the son of the local schoolmaster, also James Mackay Shewan, and his wife, Jane Ridland. On the death of his father the family moved to Aberdeen. There he was educated at the Central Secondary School and won a scholarship to Aberdeen University where he studied Chemistry and Geology, graduating BSc in 1932. He then did postgraduate studies and received a doctorate (PhD).

In 1960 he was elected a Fellow of the Royal Society of Edinburgh. His proposers were George Adam Reay, David Cuthbertson, Vero Wynne-Edwards and Alexander Macdonald.

He died on 23 June 1988.

== Publications ==
- Marine Microbiology - Deep Sea (1963) - translation
- The Estimation of Trimethylamine in Fish Muscle (1972)
- The Deeside Field Club (1981)
- Monumental Inscriptions in Monymusk Churchyard (1986)
