= Elisabeth Thorsell =

Swedish writer and genealogist (born 1945)

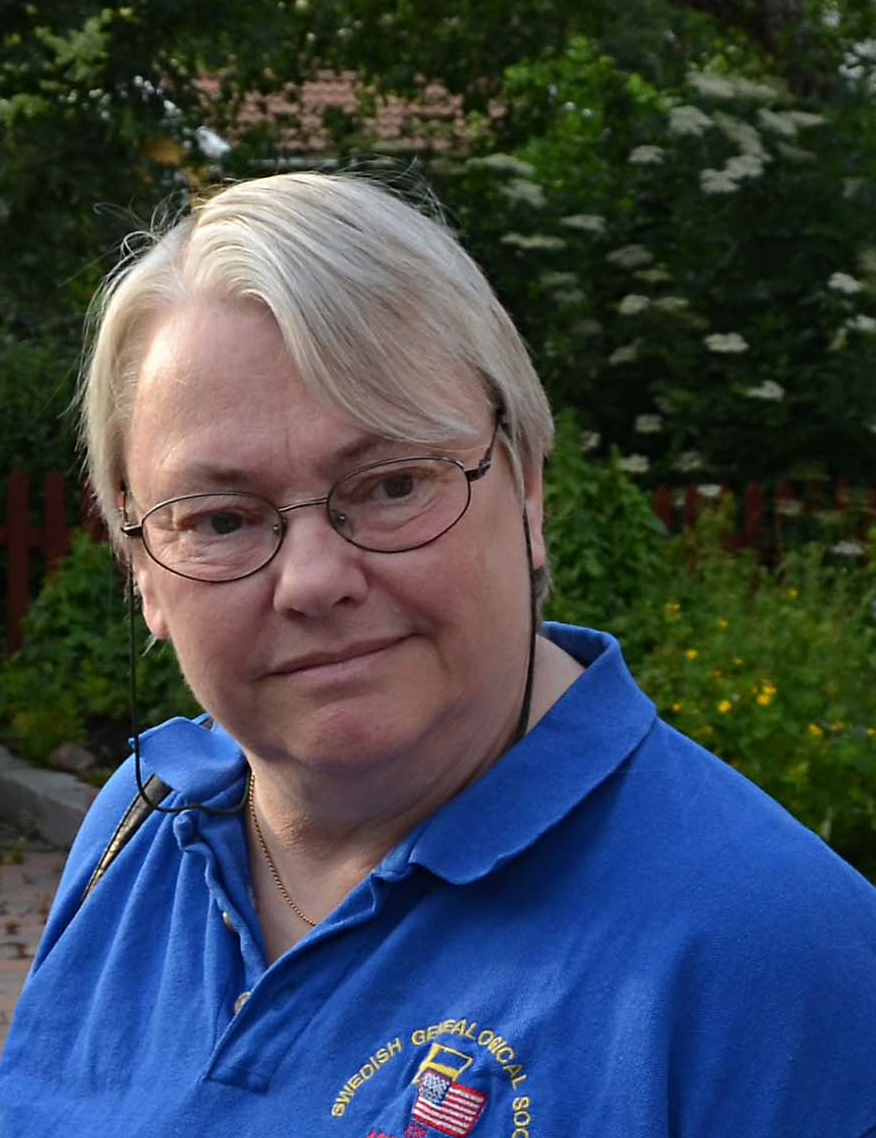
- Born: 15 August 1945 (age 80)
- Occupations: Writer, editor, professional genealogist
- Parent(s): Sven Dalhammar, mining engineer, and Brita Dalhammar (née Nathorst)
- Website: etgenealogy.se/english.htm

Elisabeth Thorsell (born 15 August 1945) is a Swedish writer, professional genealogist and a veteran within the Swedish genealogical movement.

== A Genealogical CV ==
Thorsell started her genealogical research in 1975. By the end of the 1970s it had developed into nearly a full-time occupation. She explained in an interview in 2007: "It was my maternal grandmother Elisabeth Nathorst and her family stories that made me interested in the past and in the lives of people […] My father Sven Dalhammar also made me interested to know more about our family." In 1980 Thorsell became treasurer and later (in 1984) the chairman of the Östgöta Genealogiska Förening (the Genealogical Society of the Province of Ostrogothia ). After having moved with her family at the year-end 1984–1985 from the city of Linköping to Stockholm, she was appointed secretary of the Genealogiska Föreningen (the Genealogical Association, a nationwide society for genealogists) in 1985. She was a member of the election committee participating in the foundation of the Federation of Swedish Genealogical Societies ("Sveriges Släktforskarförbund"). She became a member of its first board of directors and from 1986 to 1996 she was employed as the Federation's secretary. From 1992 to 2001 Thorsell was the editor of the Federation's genealogical magazine Släkthistoriskt forum.

Since January 2004, she is the editor of the quarterly magazine Swedish American Genealogist, published by the Swenson Swedish Immigration Research Center (Swenson Center) in Rock Island, Illinois. From 1987 to 2000 she edited the genealogical book series Svenska släktkalendern (Swedish Family Register). Since 2002, she publishes the electronic, genealogical magazine Vi släktforskare ("We Genealogists"), and she is, since 2007, the president of the Svenska Genealogiska Samfundet, a genealogical society with the sole purpose of publishing quality-assured articles on genealogical, biographical and related topics. As a professional genealogist specializing in emigration research she has (since 1975) primarily been researching Swedish families for Americans with a Swedish origin.

== Publications ==
Elisabeth Thorsell has written a large number of articles and independent publications, from texts with a methodical, "how-to-do" focus to extensive investigations of specific families and biographies. The Swedish national union catalogue LIBRIS lists (as of July 2014) 205 publications to which she has contributed, as an independent writer, as a co-writer or in the capacity of editor. Most of the articles have been published in Släkthistoriskt Forum, the genealogical yearbook Släktforskarnas årsbok (both published by the Federation of Swedish Genealogical Societies), and Släkt och Hävd, a quarterly published by the Genealogiska Föreningen. Her works comprise a wide field of topics, with a special focus on Swedish emigrants in the USA such as: Utvandrare till USA: några förslag på hur du kan hitta dem (Emigrants to the USA: some suggestions how to find them (2011, ISBN 978-91-971688-4-7). Her handbook Släktforskning – vägen till din egen historia (Genealogical Research – The Road to Your Own History) has been published in several editions, the latest in a re-worked and extended version in August 2014 (ISBN 9789153439677).

== Acclaim ==
In 1994, Elisabeth Thorsell was appointed corresponding member of the Genealogiska Samfundet i Finland ("Genealogical Society of Finland"). In 2006 she was awarded the Victor Örnbergs hederspris ("the Victor Örnberg Honorary Award") by the Federation of Swedish Genealogical Societies for her long-standing contributions to the Swedish genealogical movement.
