= Aegaeus =

River god in Greek mythology

In Greek mythology, Aegaeus (Ancient Greek: Αἰγαῖος) was the name of multiple figures:

1. One of the river-gods. He lived on the island of Scheria, widely considered to be the modern island of Corfu. He was the father of Melite, who bore Heracles a son, Hyllus, and of the nymphs Aigaiides.

2. A surname of Poseidon, derived from the town of Aegae in Euboea.
