= Jan Boland Coetzee =

South African rugby union footballer (1945–2025)

- Born: Johannes Hermanus Hugo Coetzee; 20 January 1945 Porterville, Cape Province, Union of South Africa
- Died: 12 September 2025 (aged 80) South Africa
- Height: 1.80 m (5 ft 11 in)
- Weight: 90 kg (198 lb)
- School: Swartland High School
- University: Stellenbosch University

Rugby union career
Amateur team(s)
Years	Team	Apps	(Points)
- Maties
Provincial / State sides
Years	Team	Apps	(Points)
1967–1979	Western Province	127	
International career
Years	Team	Apps	(Points)
1974–1976	South Africa	6	

Johannes Hermanus Hugo "Jan Boland" Coetzee (20 January 1945 – 12 September 2025) was a South African rugby union player and wine maker. He was a wine farmer and winemaker at his farm Vriesenhof, in the Stellenbosch region.

== Playing career ==
Coetzee enrolled at Stellenbosch University in 1963 for a degree in Oenology and started playing rugby for the university's under 18 team, of which he was also captain. He continued to play for the Maties rugby club and was also their captain on a regular basis until 1979. Coetzee made his provincial debut for Western Province in 1967 and played in 127 matches, scoring 37 tries for the union.

Coetzee made his test debut for the Springboks in the first test against the 1974 British Lions at Newlands in Cape Town. He was dropped from the team after the first test and his second test for the Springboks was as a replacement for Moaner van Heerden in the second half of the second test against France in 1975. Coetzee then played in all four tests in the 1976 series against the All Blacks.

== Death ==
Coetzee died on 12 September 2025, at the age of 80.

== Test history ==
No.	Opponents	Results (RSA 1st)	Position	Tries	Dates	Venue
1.	British Lions	3–12	Flank		8 June 1974	Newlands, Cape Town
2.	France	33–18	Replacement		28 June 1975	Loftus Versfeld, Pretoria
3.	New Zealand	16–7	Flank		24 July 1976	Kings Park Stadium, Durban
4.	New Zealand	9–15	Flank		14 August 1976	Free State Stadium, Bloemfontein
5.	New Zealand	15–10	Flank		4 September 1976	Newlands, Cape Town
6.	New Zealand	15–14	Flank		18 September 1976	Ellis Park Stadium, Johannesburg

== See also ==
- List of South Africa national rugby union players – Springbok no. 463
