= Deefgea =

Scientific classification
- Domain: Bacteria
- Kingdom: Pseudomonadati
- Phylum: Pseudomonadota
- Class: Betaproteobacteria
- Order: Neisseriales
- Family: Neisseriaceae
- Genus: Deefgea; Stackebrandt et al. 2007

Type species
- Deefgea rivuli

Species
- D. chitinilytica D. rivuli

Genus of bacteria

Deefgea is a genus of bacteria in the phylum Pseudomonadota. Deefgea are described as Gram-negative, rod-shaped, facultative anaerobes which generally occur singly. Deefgea are motile, either by a single flagellum or two polar flagella. They are both catalase and oxidase positive.

== Etymology ==
The name Deefgea derives from:

Neo-Latin feminine gender noun Deefgea, arbitrary name derived from the acronym DFG for Deutsche Forschungsgemeinschaft (German Science Foundation).

The genus contains 2 species (including basonyms and synonyms), namely

- D. chitinilytica ( Chen et al. 2010; Neo-Latin noun chitinum, chitin; Neo-Latin feminine gender adjective lytica (from Greek feminine gender adjective lutikē), able to loosen, able to dissolve; Neo-Latin feminine gender adjective chitinilytica, chitin-dissolving.)
- D. rivuli ( Stackebrandt et al. 2007, (Type species of the genus).;: Latin genitive case masculine gender noun rivuli, of/from a rivulet, a small brook.)

== See also ==
- Bacterial taxonomy
- Microbiology
