= Federico Uruburu =

Spanish microbiologist

Federico Uruburu Fernandez
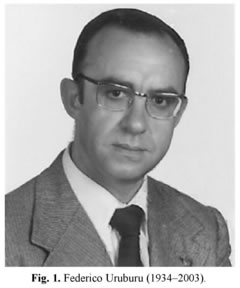
- Federico Uruburu
- Born: October 3, 1934; Granada, Andalucía, Spain
- Died: September 20, 2003; Near Porto, Portugal
- Occupation: microbiologist

Federico Uruburu Fernandez was a Spanish microbiologist. He was involved in early development of microbiology and electron microscopy in Spain, and was instrumental in establishing the Spanish Type Culture Collection.
