= Palleronia =

Scientific classification
- Domain: Bacteria
- Kingdom: Pseudomonadati
- Phylum: Pseudomonadota
- Class: Alphaproteobacteria
- Order: Rhodobacterales
- Family: Rhodobacteraceae
- Genus: Palleronia; Martinez-Checa et al. 2005

Species
- Palleronia abyssalis; Palleronia marisminoris

Synonyms
- Roseobacterium

Genus of bacteria

Palleronia is a genus of bacteria in the family Rhodobacteraceae.
