= Mameliella =

Scientific classification
- Domain: Bacteria
- Kingdom: Pseudomonadati
- Phylum: Pseudomonadota
- Class: Alphaproteobacteria
- Order: Rhodobacterales
- Family: Rhodobacteraceae
- Genus: Mameliella; Zheng et al. 2010

Type species
- Mameliella alba Zheng et al. 2010

Species
- Mameliella alba Zheng et al. 2010

Synonyms
- Alkalimicrobium Zhang et al. 2015

Genus of bacteria

Mameliella is a genus in the phylum Pseudomonadota (Bacteria). The name Mameliella derives from: Neo-Latin feminine gender dim. noun Mameliella, arbitrary name derived from the acronym MMEL, marine microbial ecology laboratory.

== Species ==
The genus contains a single species, namely M. alba (Zheng et al. 2010, (Type species of the genus).; Latin feminine gender adjective alba, white.)

== See also ==
- Bacterial taxonomy
- Microbiology
