= Melite (naiad) =

Nymph of Greek mythology

In Greek mythology, Melite (/ˈmɛlɪtiː/; Ancient Greek: Μελίτη) was one of the Naiads, daughter of the river god Aegaeus, and one of the many loves of Zeus and his son Heracles. Given the choice, she chose Heracles over Zeus who went off in search of other pursuits. She gave birth to Hercules's son Hyllus; some suggest that he was a figure distinct from Hyllus, the son of Heracles by Deianeira.

== Mythology ==
Heracles tried to find refuge on the mythical island of Scheria, widely considered to be the island of Corfu in modern Greece, after the murder of his children. He decided to rest near a lake. This lake happened to be the place in which Melite and her sisters were currently residing. When Melite saw Hercules she hid him away from her siblings in a deeper and darker part of the lake where she lay with him. The two then traveled to another part of the island and stayed there until Melite gave birth to Hyllus.

Zeus was in a rage over her choice of a mortal over him, and so he appealed to her father who would not let her have anymore children with Hercules or any sexual contact whatsoever. Hercules promptly left Melite for other mortals. She was one of the women who were there mourning the death of Hercules.

Hyllus did not want to be a mere subject to King Nausithous, so he traveled to the far north of Greece, where he became king and eponym of a Dorian tribe, the Hylleis.
