= Björn Thorsell =

Swedish ice hockey player

- Born: 20 March 1964 (age 62)
- Position: Defence
- Played for: Stocksund; Djurgården; Nacka; Vita Hästen; Danderyd/Täby
- Playing career: 1980–1992

Björn Thorsell (born 20 March 1964) is a retired Swedish ice hockey defender. Thorsell was part of the Djurgården Swedish champions' team of 1983.

Thorsell made 247 Division 1 appearances for Nacka HK, IK Vita Hästen, and Danderyd/Täby, and has also represented the Division 2 side Stocksunds IF.
