= Mesonia =

Scientific classification
- Domain: Bacteria
- Kingdom: Pseudomonadati
- Phylum: Bacteroidota
- Class: Flavobacteriia
- Order: Flavobacteriales
- Family: Flavobacteriaceae
- Genus: Mesonia; Nedashkovskaya et al. 2003

Species
- M. algae M. aquimarina M. hippocampi M. maritima M. maritimus M. mobilis M. oceanica M. ostreae M. phycicola M. sediminis

Bacterium

Mesonia is a strictly aerobic and chemoorganotrophic genus of bacteria from the family of Flavobacteriaceae.
