= Pillotina =

Scientific classification
- Domain: Bacteria
- Kingdom: Pseudomonadati
- Phylum: Spirochaetota
- Class: Spirochaetia
- Order: Spirochaetales
- Family: Spirochaetaceae
- Genus: Pillotina (ex Hollande and Gharagozlou 1967) Bermudes et al. 1988
- Species: P. calotermitidis

Binomial name
- Pillotina calotermitidis (ex Hollande and Gharagozlou 1967) Bermudes et al. 1988

Genus of bacteria

Pillotina calotermitidis is a species of spirochete that is symbiotic in wood-eating cockroaches and termites, and is the type species of the genus Pillotina.
