= Claude E. ZoBell =

American microbiologist (1904–1989)

Claude Ephraim ZoBell
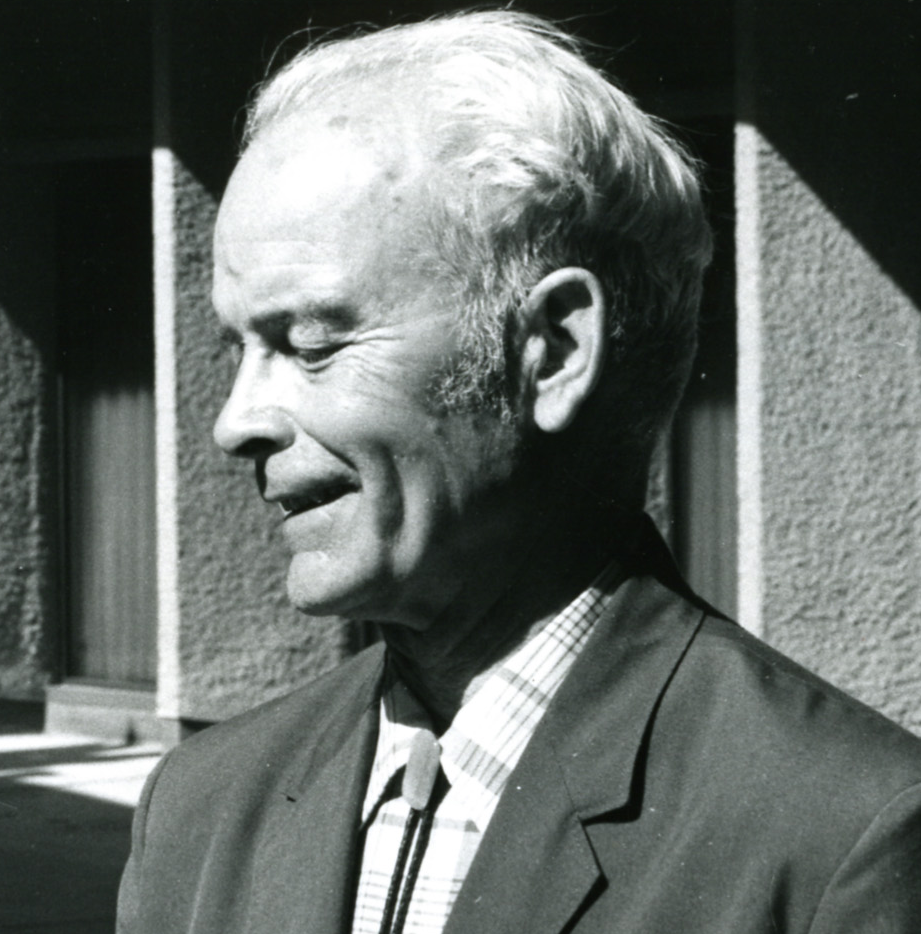
- Claude E. ZoBell
- Born: 22 August 1904; Provo, Utah
- Died: 13 March 1989 (aged 84); La Jolla, California

Claude Ephraim ZoBell (August 22, 1904 – March 13, 1989) was a pioneering American microbiologist who is recognized as the father of marine microbiology. ZoBell travelled the world collecting samples from the deepest abysmal depths of the ocean. He published nearly 300 research papers as a professor at University of California San Diego and member of the Scripps Institution of Oceanography.

== Early life and education ==
Claude ZoBell was born to a family of Danish origins, the son of Stella May Davis (1881-1958) and Ephraim Andrew ZoBell (1874-1938). He was born in 1904 in Provo, Utah, the third of seven children. His family moved to the Upper Snake River, the town of Rigby, Idaho. They were members of the Church of Jesus Christ of Latter-day Saints.

ZoBell graduated from Southern Idaho College of Education in 1922. For a few years, he taught elementary school in Rigby, Idaho, before resigning in 1926. He attended Utah State Agricultural College (now Utah State University), earning a BS in bacteriology in 1927, and an MS in bacteriology in 1929. ZoBell earned his Ph.D. at the University of California, Berkeley in 1931 as a Thompson Scholar. His thesis under the mentorship of Dr. Karl Meyer focused on Brucella pathogens and produced nine publications.

== Career ==
Following his doctoral studies, ZoBell joined the Scripps Institution of Oceanography in 1932 as an Instructor of Marine Microbiology, where he spent his entire career until becoming professor emeritus in 1972. ZoBell was awarded tenure and promotion in 1942 and became a full professor in 1948. He was a Research Associate at University of Wisconsin, received a Rockefeller Foundation Fellowship to work abroad, and worked at Princeton University. He was Assistant to the Director at Scripps (1936-1952), member of the executive committee of the Institute of Marine Resources, and Chairman of the Division of Marine Biology.

At Scripps, ZoBell embarked on an extensive research career investigating the presence and behavior of microorganisms in ocean environments. ZoBell traveled widely in search of marine microbes from the greatest depths of the ocean. Joining the Galathea Expedition (1950-1952), he circumnavigated the world collecting samples from depths greater than 35,000 feet. He was part of the Naga Expedition (1959-1961), sampled the Marianas Trench with the Dodo Expedition (1964), and collected from the Japan-Bonin Trench with the Zetes Expedition (1966).

His work demonstrated the ubiquity of bacteria even in the extreme depths of the ocean and their ecological roles within the marine ecosystem. ZoBell discovered that bacteria readily adhere to submerged surfaces, which became a fundamental concept in biofilm microbiology. To study microbial colonization, he invented sampling devices such as a slide carrier, enabling scientists to collect and culture marine microbes in their natural environments, overcoming previous laboratory culturing difficulties.

ZoBell also contributed significantly to the study of barobiology (the effects of high pressure on living organisms), particularly through his participation in the 1951 Galathea deep-sea expedition. He helped establish that bacterial populations thrive under the extreme pressures found in deep ocean trenches, refuting the then-prevailing notion of a deep-sea azoic zone devoid of life.

His research extended into petroleum microbiology and marine pollution, influencing diverse scientific fields related to microbial ecology and environmental science. Throughout his career, ZoBell published nearly 300 scientific papers and founded the journal Geomicrobiology in 1976. He is the author of Marine microbiology: a monograph on hydrobacteriology (1946). ZoBell consulted for NASA, oil companies, and in epidemiology. He was the first president of the American Society for Limnology and Oceanography (1948-1949), Western Society of Naturalists (1955), and the San Diego Society of Natural History.

== Legacy and honors ==
ZoBell's contributions earned recognition from the American Society for Microbiology and the broader scientific community. ZoBell was awarded the Oceanographic Medal of the USR Academy of Science, the Galathea Medal, a US Congressional citation, and the Hatai Medal of the Pacific Science Association. Utah State University awarded him an honorary D.Sc. and a Distinguished Service Award. He was an honorary member of the American Society for Microbiology, Microbiological Society of Thailand, and the Oceanographical Society of Japan. In 2009, the Scripps Institution of Oceanography was designated a "Milestones in Microbiology" site in honor of ZoBell's foundational work in marine microbiology.

ZoBell retired in 1972, becoming professor emeritus. His papers are held in the Special Collections & Archives of UC San Diego in La Jolla, California.

== Personal life ==
ZoBell was married to Margaret Harding (1908-1994) in 1930. They had two sons, Dean and Karl. He was divorced in 1946. The next year, he married Jean Elliott Switzer (1919-2016), who also was a microbiologist.

ZoBell donated his time to the Boy Scouts of America, Greater San Diego Science Fairs, San Diego Society of Natural History, Research Council of the San Diego Zoo, American Red Cross, and sat on the Board of Directors of the La Jolla Visiting Nurses Association. He funded many scholarships in Rigby, Idaho, and the construction of the Farnsworth Television Pioneer Museum.

ZoBell died of heart failure at the age of 84 in La Jolla, California. He was buried in Rigby Pioneer Cemetery. At the time of his death, ZoBell had 11 grandchildren and 12 great-grandchildren.
