= Maureen Coetzee =

Medical entomologist

- Born: 8 October 1951 (age 74); Benoni, South Africa
- Education: PhD University of the Witwatersrand
- Spouse: Richard Hewish Hunt (m. 1989; d. 2021)
- Scientific career
- Fields: Malaria
- Workplaces: University of the Witwatersrand South African Institute for Medical Research Malaria Control Programme, SA Department of Health, Tzaneen
- Website: www.wits.ac.za/health/research-entities/

Maureen Coetzee is a medical entomologist, specialising in African malaria vector mosquitoes for over 40 years. She is currently a Distinguished Professor in the Wits Research Institute for Malaria, School of Pathology at the University of the Witwatersrand. She is a member of the Academy of Science of South Africa. She is a consultant in the World Health Organization 's Global Malaria Programme. She obtained her Doctorate from the University of the Witwatersrand. A subgenus of the Aedes mosquito, Coetzeemyia, was named after her. Also a genus of bacteria strongly associated with malaria mosquitoes, Coetzeea, was named after her. Professor Coetzee has published over 190 peer-reviewed scholarly articles.

== Awards and honors ==
- The Kwame Nkrumah Science Award, (2011)
