= André Romain Prévot =

- Born: 22 July 1894; Douai, Nord
- Died: 21 November 1982 (aged 88); Clamart, Hauts-de-Seine
- Occupation: Bacteriologist

André-Romain Prévot (French: [ɑ̃dʁe ʁɔmɛ̃ pʁevo]; born in Douai, Nord on 22 July 1894, died in Clamart, Hauts-de-Seine on 21 November 1982) was a French bacteriologist. He authored a classification of bacteria, gave his name to a genus of Gram-negative bacteria, prevotella, and created in 1978 the médaille Pasteur of Académie des Sciences of France.

In 1914 as the war started, he was assigned as an auxiliary physician in Infanterie; he knew the life in the trenches, the murderous battles of the Chemin des Dames, and the hell of Verdun where his heroic conduct earned him the Croix de Guerre. This constant communion with suffering and death influenced his taste and directed him toward the medicine to which he devoted himself.

After the armistice, he was released and evacuated to Denmark, where the exchange of medical prisoners took place. It was there that he met a medical student, Anna Sorensen, whom he married in 1919. They stayed together all their lives and had four children.

He was elected member of Académie des Sciences on 28 January 1963, member of IVe Section de l'Académie Nationale de Médecine in 1966, Officier de la Légion d'Honneur, and Grand Officier du Mérite National.
