= Sneathiella =

Scientific classification
- Domain: Bacteria
- Kingdom: Pseudomonadati
- Phylum: Pseudomonadota
- Class: Alphaproteobacteria
- Order: Sneathiellales
- Family: Sneathiellaceae
- Genus: Sneathiella; Jordan et al. 2007

Type species
- Sneathiella chinensis

Species
- S. chinensis S. chungangensis S. glossodoripedis

Genus of bacteria

Sneathiella is a halotolerant, aerobic and chemoheterotrophic genus of bacteria from the family of Sneathiellaceae.

Sneathiella is named after the British microbiologist Peter H. A. Sneath.
