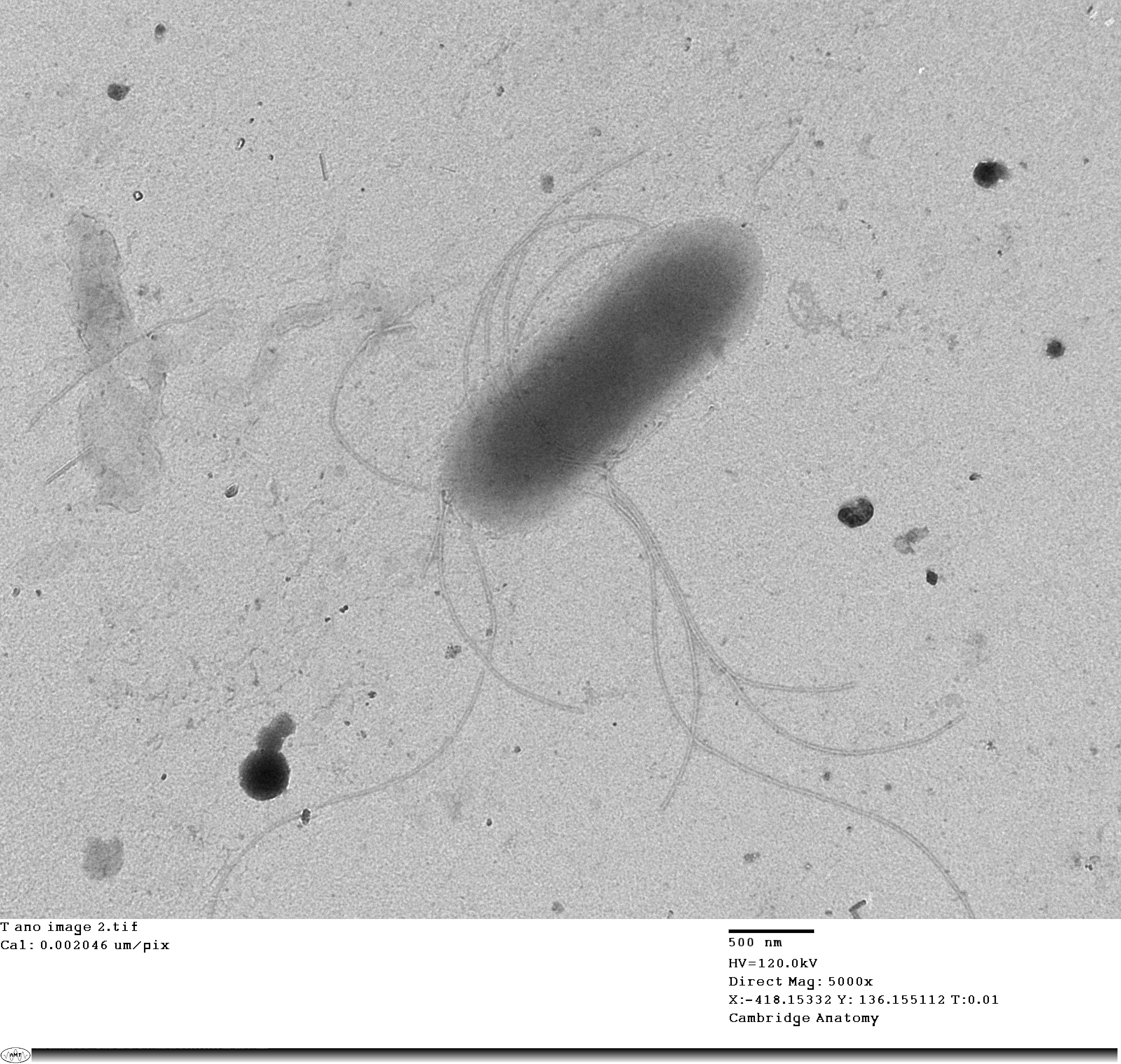
- Thorsellia anophelis

Scientific classification
- Domain: Bacteria
- Kingdom: Pseudomonadati
- Phylum: Pseudomonadota
- Class: Gammaproteobacteria
- Order: incertae sedis
- Family: Thorselliaceae; Kämpfer et al. 2015

Species
- Coetzeea brasiliensis Thorsellia anophelis Thorsellia kandunguensis Thorsellia kenyensis

= Thorselliaceae =

Family of bacteria

Thorselliaceae is a family of bacteria belonging to the class Gammaproteobacteria and it was first described in February 2015. It is not assigned to an order. The family consists of four species in two genera. The bacteria are Gram-negative and rod shaped, approximately 1 μm wide and 2 μm long. They are facultative anaerobes and motile. Thorselliaceae bacteria have been found around the world associated with vector mosquitoes, mainly with vectors of malaria.

The first described species was Thorsellia anophelis. It was isolated from the midgut of the malaria mosquito Anopheles arabiensis from Kenya. This new bacterium was given its name after the Swedish researcher Walborg Thorsell who worked with mosquitoes and insecticides against mosquitoes for many years. Thorsellia bacteria have now been found in mosquito species that are the major vectors of malaria in Africa, Asia and South America. The bacteria have also been found in the waters where the malaria mosquitoes breed. Some properties of Thorsellia suggest that they are adapted to the mosquito guts, they can accept an alkaline pH, which is found in mosquito larvae and they grow faster in blood culture. However, T. anophelis has also been found in the reproductive tissues of male and female Anopheles gambiae and An. coluzzii mosquitoes.

Currently, little is known about Thorselliaceae in nature apart from that it has been shown in several studies that Thorsellia anophelis dominate the malaria mosquito gut flora and their breeding waters.

Thorsellia has besides in Anopheles also been found to dominate the gut flora in the mosquito species Culex tarsalis, which is a vector of among other things, West Nile virus and encephalitis. It as also been shown that T. anophelis is much more abundant in Cx. nigripalpus than in Cx. coronator. Coetzeea (named after the South African mosquito researcher Maureen Coetzee) has so far only been found in Brazilian Anopheles darlingi.

== Application ==
A possible application of Thorselliaceae is in paratransgenesis to prevent the transmission of malaria. This would involve genetically transforming the bacteria with genes that produce effector molecules against malaria parasites inside the malaria mosquito gut. Thorselliaceae can be grown in the laboratory under normal conditions and are related to the bacterium Escherichia coli which suggests that the molecular techniques needed could be similar to those available for E. coli.
