= Lee Coetzee =

South African cricketer (born 1984)

Lee Coetzee (born 28 February 1984) is a South African cricketer. He is a right-handed batsman and a right-arm medium-pace bowler who plays for Easterns.

Having made his List A debut for the team in February 2008, in the SAA Provincial One-Day Challenge, Coetzee made his first-class debut in October 2008.
