= Euzebya =

Scientific classification
- Domain: Bacteria
- Kingdom: Bacillati
- Phylum: Actinomycetota
- Class: Nitriliruptoria
- Order: Euzebyales; Kurahashi et al. 2010
- Family: Euzebyaceae; Kurahashi et al. 2010
- Genus: Euzebya; Kurahashi et al. 2010

Type species
- Euzebya tangerina Kurahashi et al. 2010

Species
- E. pacifica; E. rosea; E. tangerina

Species of bacterium

Euzebya is a genus of Gram-positive bacteria.

== Phylogeny ==
The currently accepted taxonomy is based on the List of Prokaryotic names with Standing in Nomenclature (LPSN) and National Center for Biotechnology Information (NCBI).

16S rRNA based LTP_08_2023 and 120 marker proteins based GTDB 10-RS226

- Euzebya
  - E. tangerina Kurahashi et al. 2010
  - - E. pacifica Jian et al. 2021
    - E. rosea Yin et al. 2018

== See also ==
- List of bacteria genera
- List of bacterial orders
