= Dasan =

Dasan is an African American masculine given name and Indian surname. Notable people with the name and surname include:

== Given name ==
- Dasan Brown (born 2001), Canadian baseball player
- Dasan McCullough (born 2003), American football player
- Dasan Robinson (born 1984), American former soccer player

== Surname ==
- K. Dasan (born 1952), Indian politician
- M. Dasan (1953–2002), Indian politician
- Periyar Dasan (1949–2013), Indian professor

== Other uses ==
- Dasan and Vijayan, fictional duo
- Dasan Machineries DSAR-15, assault rifle
- DASAN Networks, network company
- Dasan Pass, mountain pass in Shaanxi Province, China
- Dasan station, metro station in Namyangju, South Korea
- T. D. Dasan Std. VI B, 2010 Malayalam film
