= Zunongwangia =

Scientific classification
- Domain: Bacteria
- Kingdom: Pseudomonadati
- Phylum: Bacteroidota
- Class: Flavobacteriia
- Order: Flavobacteriales
- Family: Flavobacteriaceae
- Genus: Zunongwangia corrig. Qin et al. 2007

Species
- Z. atlantica Z. endophytica Z. flava Z. mangrovi Z. profunda

Synonyms
- Wangia Qin et al. 2007

Bacterium

Zunongwangia is a genus of bacteria from the family of Flavobacteriaceae.
