= Dasania =

Scientific classification
- Domain: Bacteria
- Kingdom: Pseudomonadati
- Phylum: Pseudomonadota
- Class: Gammaproteobacteria
- Order: Cellvibrioales
- Family: Spongiibacteraceae
- Genus: Dasania; Lee et al. 2008

Type species
- Dasania marina Lee et al. 2008

Species
- See text

Genus of bacteria

Dasania is a genus in the phylum Pseudomonadota (Bacteria).

== Etymology ==
The name Dasania derives from:
Neo-Latin feminine gender noun Dasania, named in honour of Dasan, a Korean scientist in 18th and 19th century and after the name of Korean Arctic research station, Dasan Station, in Ny-Ålesund.

== Species ==
The genus contains two species, namely Dasania marina (Lee et al. 2008, Latin feminine gender adjective marina, of the sea, marine, referring to the environment where the type strain was isolated.) and Dasania phycosphaerae.
