= DASAN Networks =

Network company

DASAN Networks 다산네트웍스
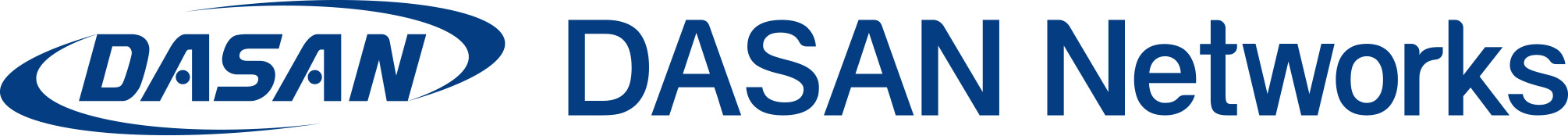
- Company type: Public
- Industry: Telecommunications equipment Networking equipment
- Founded: March 1993
- Headquarters: South Korea
- Key people: MinWoo Nam(Chairman, Founder)
- Products: Hardware, software and services to telecommunications service providers and enterprises

DASAN Networks (Korean: 다산네트웍스) develops and manufactures network equipment for fixed and mobile broadband services. DASAN Networks was established as DASAN Engineering Co., Ltd in 1993, listed in KOSDAQ in 2000, and changed its company name to DASAN Networks Inc. in 2002.

DASAN Network Solutions as a subsidiary company to specialize in network products development, production and sales. They include FTTx (Fiber-to-the-x), Ethernet Switch, xDSL, Mobile Backhaul, Wireless LAN.

== Subsidiaries ==
DASAN Networks is a network equipment development company for fixed and mobile broadband services. DASAN Networks became a holding company in April 2015 in order to consolidate network solution business. DASAN Networks is a parent company that focuses on investment/management of its subsidiaries, as well as operation of network solution business for enterprise and government. DASAN Network Solutions, a subsidiary of DASAN Networks, focuses on network solutions for telecom operators around the world.

DASAN Networks is affiliated with HandySoft (software development company), DMC (automobile parts development company), Solueta (EMC solution development company), and DTS (Industrial heat exchanger development company).

== Business ==
DASAN Networks' major customers are SoftBank in Japan, Chunghwa Telecom in Taiwan, Viettel in Vietnam, KT Corporation, SK broadband, LG U+ in Korea and other global telecom operators. To accommodate the increasing network traffic, DASAN Networks has developed Tera-speed high-performing switch and G.fast solution which enables telecom operators utilize existing network infrastructure. DASAN Networks also provides network solutions for IoT services for diverse industry including enterprise, government, school, military, tourism and transportation.

=== Products ===
FTTH, Ethernet switch, xDSL, Wireless Access, IP-PTT, Security Switch
