= Walborg Thorsell =

Swedish zoologist

Walborg Susanna Thorsell (12 February 1919 – January 2016) was a Swedish scientist who performed research mainly on mosquitoes and mosquito repellents.

== Education ==
Thorsell defended her thesis for her doctorate in veterinary medicine at the Swedish Veterinarian Institute in 1967, and was a docent in experimental parasitology.

== Research ==
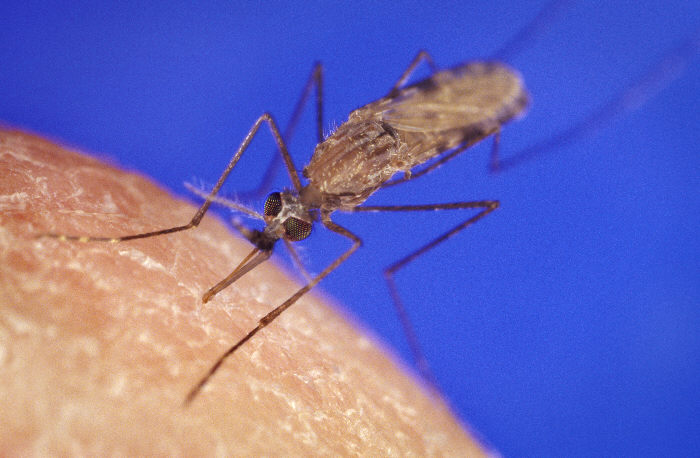
Anopheles gambiae, malaria mosquito

Thorsell started her studies on mosquitoes while working at the Swedish National Defence Research Institute (FOA). At that time claims circulated, from both the United States and the Soviet Union, that the other part was conducting experiments with malaria mosquitos in relations to biological warfare. The Swedish military therefore felt it necessary to develop a mosquito repellent, especially for malaria mosquitoes, to be used by Swedish soldiers. The existing repellents were either not efficient enough or had unwanted side effects, so Thorsell and her group of researchers at FOA began looking for a better agent. The substance diethylamide proved to be an excellent repellent for both malaria mosquitoes and ordinary Swedish forest mosquitoes. But in its unmodified form, it is water-soluble and was washed away by the sweat when applied on the soldiers. Thorsells' solution to this was to add the same functional groups as in diethylamide to mandelic acid. This resulted in a mosquito repellent, called DEMIDEX, that was manufactured during a number of years. DEMIDEX was more efficient than the American DEET, which was and still is the most common active ingredient in insect repellents.

After retiring from FOA, Thorsell continued her research on mosquito repellents at the Department of Zoology at Stockholm University. That research resulted in the repellent ingredient IXNIX. She died in January 2016 at the age of 96.

== Honours ==
A family of bacteria, Thorselliaceae, found in vector mosquitoes, mainly with vectors of malaria, has been named after Thorsell. The family contains the genus Thorsellia of which three species are known so far.

== Bibliography ==
A selection.

- Krigsepidemiologi och hälsovård för totalförsvaret: dokumentation från FOA informationsdag, översiktsdag, Stockholm, 1982-05-05 (Warfare epidemiology and health care within the Swedish total defence : documentation from the FOA conference, Stockholm, 82-05-05) 1983
- Människans fysiska tålighet i brandmiljö: brandgaser och rök (Man's physical tolerance in fires: fumes and smoke) 1984
- Människan och ohyran - bekämpningsmedel i Sverige förr och nu (Man and Vermin – pesticides in Sweden, past and present) 2001
