= Sneathiellaceae =

Scientific classification
- Domain: Bacteria
- Kingdom: Pseudomonadati
- Phylum: Pseudomonadota
- Class: Alphaproteobacteria
- Order: Sneathiellales; Kurahashi et al., 2008
- Family: Sneathiellaceae; Kurahashi et al., 2008

Genera
- Ferrovibrio Sorokina et al., 2013; Marinibaculum Yu et al., 2016; Oceanibacterium Balcázar et al., 2013; Sneathiella Jordan et al., 2007; Taonella Xi et al., 2013

Family of bacteria

The Sneathiellaceae are a family of bacteria.
