= List of bacterial genera named after geographical names =

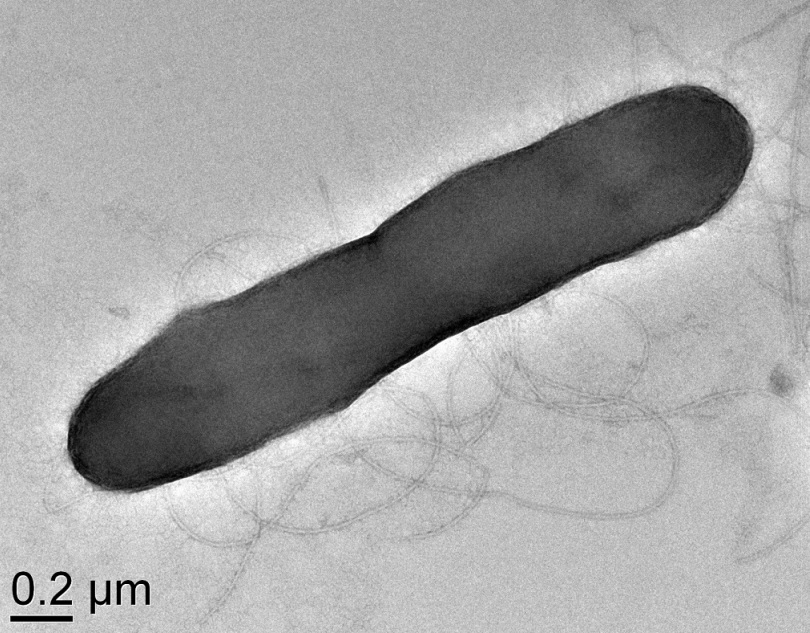
Massilia armeniaca is named for two locations: Marseille and Armenia

Several bacterial species are named after geographical locations.

For the generic epithet, all names derived from people or places (unless in combination) must be in the female nominative case, either by changing the ending to -a or to the diminutive -ella, depending on the name. If a Latin word for the locality exists that should be used ignoring geopolitical differences, e.g. Sina for China.

- Aegyptianella – Aegyptus (the Latin name of Egypt)
- Aidingimonas – Ayding Lake (Xinjiang province of north-west China)
- Antarctobacter – Antarctica
- Balneola – Balneola (the medieval Latin name of Banyuls, France)
- Bavariicoccus – Bavaria (Germany)
- Beutenbergia – Beutenberg (Germany)
- Bogoriella – Lake Bogoria (Kenya)
- Brooklawnia – Brooklawn (the contaminated site from which members of the genus were first isolated)
- Budvicia – Budvicium (the Latin name of the city České Budějovice)
- Daeguia – Daegu (Korea)
- Delftia – Delft (the Netherlands)
- Dokdonella – Dokdo (the Korean name of Liancourt Rocks)
- Dokdonia – Dokdo (the Korean name of Liancourt Rocks)
- Donghaeana – Donghae (the Korean name of the Sea of Japan)
- Donghicola – Donghae (the Korean name of the Sea of Japan)
- Gallaecimonas – Galicia (region of northwest Spain)
- Gangjinia – Gangjin Bay (Korea Strait, Korea)
- Gelria – Gelre or Gelderland (one of the 12 provinces in The Netherlands)
- Georgenia – St Georgen (a village in Styria)
- Hafnia – Hafnia (the Latin name for Copenhagen, Denmark)
- Herminiimonas – Mons Herminius (a mountain range of Lusitania)
- Hwanghaeicola – Hwanghae Province, Korean
- Indibacter – India
- Jejuia – Jeju Island (the largest island in Korea)
- Jeongeupia – Jeongeup (Korean city, where Naejang mountain is located)
- Kiloniella – Kilonium (the Latin name of the northern German city of Kiel, Germany)
- Kinneretia – Lake Kinneret (Israel)
- Koreibacter – Korea
- Lutaonella – Lutao (a small volcanic island in the Pacific Ocean)
- Massilia (bacterium) – Massilia (the Latin name of Marseille, France)
- Mechercharimyces – Mecherchar lake (a marine lake located on Mecherchar Island in the Republic of Palau)
- Mitsuaria – Matsue (Shimane Prefecture, Japan)
- Nevskia – Neva (a river in St. Petersburg, Russia)
- Okibacterium – Oka River (Russia)
- Orientia – The Orient
- Pannonibacter – Pannonia (the Roman province in what is now Hungary), and also Lake Pannon (Hungary)
- Phocaeicola – Phocaea (a maritime town of Ionia, modern-day Foça in Turkey)
- Pragia – Prague (Czech Republic)
- Providencia – Providence (Rhode Island, U.S.A)
- Reinekea – Reineke Island (Peter the Great Bay, Sea of Japan, Russia)
- Rhodanobacter – Rhodanus (River Rhône)
- Salana – River Saale (Germany)
- Sejongia – King Sejong Station (Korea) – the strain was isolated form this station which is named after Sejong the Great of the Joseon Dynasty.
- Seohaeicola – Seohae (the Korean name of the Yellow Sea)
- Sinobaca – Sina (the medieval Latin name of China)
- Sinobacter – Sina (the medieval Latin name of China)
- Sinococcus – Sina (the medieval Latin name of China)
- Sinomonas – Sina (the medieval Latin name of China)
- Sinorhizobium – Sina (the medieval Latin name of China)
- Sinosporangium – Sina (the medieval Latin name of China)
- Stygiolobus – River Styx (a river in Greek mythology which formed the boundary between Earth and the Underworld)
- Tamlana – Tamla (the old name for Jeju Island, Korea) according to the description in the IJSME article
- Tateyamaria – Tateyama, Chiba, Japan
- Turicella – Turicum (the Latin name of Zürich, Switzerland)
- Turicibacter – Turicum (the Latin name of Zürich, Switzerland)
- Victivallis – Referring to the Wageningen 'Food Valley', an area of The Netherlands in which Food Science is a major research topic
- Wandonia – Wando (an island located on the Southern Sea in Korea)
- Yeosuana – Yeosu (Korea)

== See also ==
- List of bacterial genera named after institutions
- List of bacterial genera named after personal names
- list of Latin and Greek words commonly used in systematic names
- List of Bacteria genera
- List of bacterial orders
- List of sequenced prokaryotic genomes
- List of clinically important bacteria
- List of sequenced archaeal genomes
- List of Archaea genera
- Synonym (taxonomy)
- Taxonomy
- LPSN, list of accepted bacterial and archaeal names
