= Oceanihabitans =

Scientific classification
- Domain: Bacteria
- Kingdom: Pseudomonadati
- Phylum: Bacteroidota
- Class: Flavobacteriia
- Order: Flavobacteriales
- Family: Flavobacteriaceae
- Genus: Oceanihabitans
- Species: O. sediminis

Binomial name
- Oceanihabitans sediminis Zhang et al. 2016

Species of bacterium

Oceanihabitans is a genus of marine bacterium in the family Flavobacteriaceae. It contains a single species, O. sediminis. It is aerobic, Gram-negative, rod-shaped, and motile by gliding. O. sediminis produces flexirubin pigments. It is positive for cytochrome c oxidase and catalase. O. sediminis can use glucose, mannose, maltose and adipic acid as sole carbon sources for chemoheterotrophic growth. It is a chemoorganotroph and is chemotaxonomically characterized by the presence of menaquinone 6 (MK-6). The type strain is S9-10^{T}.

== Physiology ==
O. sediminis is an aerobic microbe and is unable to grow under anaerobic or microaerophilic conditions. The major respiratory quinone is MK-6. It is cytochrome c oxidase and catalase positive. Oceanihabitans sediminis is capable of synthesizing a variety of hydrolytic enzymes including alkaline phosphatase, acid phosphatase, esterase lipase (C8), cysteine arylamidase, leucine arylamidase, valine arylamidase, naphthol-AS-Bi-phosphohydrolase, and chymotrypsin. A positive leucine arylamidase result indicates O. sediminis can hydrolyze proteins into oligopeptides or individual amino acids. The products of this reaction can serve as substrates for cell metabolism. A positive esterase lipase result indicates O. sediminis can break down emulsified mono-, di and triglycerides into glycerol and fatty acid residues.

== Ecology ==
Members of the family Flavobacteriaceae are distributed globally. However, the abundance and diversity increases south of the polar front. O. sediminis strain S9-10^{T} was isolated from a sediment sample in the northern Yellow Sea in China. The phosphatase activity of marine microorganisms plays a pivotal role in phosphorus and carbon biogeochemical cycles. Phosphatase-producing bacteria are capable of hydrolyzing specific dissolved organic phosphorus compounds. This supplies pools of phosphorus and carbon to heterotrophic and autotrophic microbes.

== Physiology ==
O. sediminis is closely related to the genera Bizionia, Olleya, Lacinutrix, Algibacter, Winogradskyella,and Gaetbulibacter. Its DNA G+C content was 34.2 mol% which is consistent with other genera in the family Flavobacteriaceae. The predominant cellular fatty acids are iso-C_{15:0} (21.1 %), iso- C_{15:1}G (16.3 %) and iso-C_{17:0} 3-OH (12.0 %). The polar lipids are phosphatidylethanolamine, aminophospholipid, aminoglycolipid, two unidentified amino-lipids, and five unidentified polar lipids.
