= Sediminicola luteus =

Scientific classification
- Domain: Bacteria
- Kingdom: Pseudomonadati
- Phylum: Bacteroidota
- Class: Flavobacteriia
- Order: Flavobacteriales
- Family: Flavobacteriaceae
- Genus: Sediminicola
- Species: S. luteus

Binomial name
- Sediminicola luteus Khan et al. 2006

Bacterium

Sediminicola luteus is a Gram-negative and rod-shaped bacterium from the genus of Sediminicola.
