= Flaviramulus aestuariivivens =

Scientific classification
- Domain: Bacteria
- Kingdom: Pseudomonadati
- Phylum: Bacteroidota
- Class: Flavobacteriia
- Order: Flavobacteriales
- Family: Flavobacteriaceae
- Genus: Flaviramulus
- Species: F. aestuariivivens

Binomial name
- Flaviramulus aestuariivivens Park et al. 2017

Type strain
- OITF-51

Bacterium

Flaviramulus aestuariivivens is a Gram-negative, aerobic bacterium from the genus of Flaviramulus which has been isolated from tidal flat from Oido in Korea.
