= Flavivirga algicola =

Scientific classification
- Domain: Bacteria
- Kingdom: Pseudomonadati
- Phylum: Bacteroidota
- Class: Flavobacteriia
- Order: Flavobacteriales
- Family: Flavobacteriaceae
- Genus: Flavivirga
- Species: F. algicola

Binomial name
- Flavivirga algicola Sun et al. 2021

Type strain
- Y03

Species of bacterium

Flavivirga algicola is a bacterium from the genus of Flavivirga which has been isolated from a red alga from the coast of Weihai.
