= Zhouia spongiae =

Scientific classification
- Domain: Bacteria
- Kingdom: Pseudomonadati
- Phylum: Bacteroidota
- Class: Flavobacteriia
- Order: Flavobacteriales
- Family: Flavobacteriaceae
- Genus: Zhouia
- Species: Z. spongiae

Binomial name
- Zhouia spongiae Zhuang et al. 2018

Type strain
- HN-Y44

Bacterium

Zhouia spongiae is a Gram-negative, rod-shaped and non-motile bacterium from the genus of Zhouia which has been isolated from a sponge from the Yangpu Bay on Hainan. The species is positive for catalase and oxidase activity. On marine agar, Z. spongiae produces smooth, circular colonies that are pale-yellow in color.
