= Jejuia marina =

Scientific classification
- Domain: Bacteria
- Kingdom: Pseudomonadati
- Phylum: Bacteroidota
- Class: Flavobacteriia
- Order: Flavobacteriales
- Family: Flavobacteriaceae
- Genus: Jejuia
- Species: J. marina

Binomial name
- Jejuia marina Kim et al. 2021

Type strain
- JH03

Species of bacterium

Jejuia marina is a Gram-negative, aerobic, rod-shaped and non-motile bacterium from the genus of Jejuia which has been isolated from the beach Udo Island.
