= Aestuariibaculum suncheonense =

Scientific classification
- Domain: Bacteria
- Kingdom: Pseudomonadati
- Phylum: Bacteroidota
- Class: Flavobacteriia
- Order: Flavobacteriales
- Family: Flavobacteriaceae
- Genus: Aestuariibaculum
- Species: A. suncheonense

Binomial name
- Aestuariibaculum suncheonense Jeong et al. 2013

Type strain
- SC17, JCM 17789, KACC 16186

Species of bacterium

Aestuariibaculum suncheonense is a Gram-negative, strictly aerobic, halotolerant and non-motil bacterium from the genus of Aestuariibaculum which has been isolated from tidal flat from the Suncheon bay in Korea.
