= Flaviramulus aquimarinus =

Scientific classification
- Domain: Bacteria
- Kingdom: Pseudomonadati
- Phylum: Bacteroidota
- Class: Flavobacteriia
- Order: Flavobacteriales
- Family: Flavobacteriaceae
- Genus: Flaviramulus
- Species: F. aquimarinus

Binomial name
- Flaviramulus aquimarinus Lee et al. 2015

Type strain
- KYW499

Bacterium

Flaviramulus aquimarinus is a Gram-negative, facultative anaerobic, rod-shaped and non-motile bacterium from the genus of Flaviramulus which has been isolated from seawater from the Suncheon Bay in Korea.
