= Pseudofulvibacter gastropodicola =

Scientific classification
- Domain: Bacteria
- Kingdom: Pseudomonadati
- Phylum: Bacteroidota
- Class: Flavobacteriia
- Order: Flavobacteriales
- Family: Flavobacteriaceae
- Genus: Pseudofulvibacter
- Species: P. gastropodicola

Binomial name
- Pseudofulvibacter gastropodicola Yang et al. 2016

Type strain
- MEBiC08749

Bacterium

Pseudofulvibacter gastropodicola is a Gram-negative, aerobic, rod-shaped and non-motile bacterium from the genus of Pseudofulvibacter.
