= Pseudofulvibacter marinus =

Scientific classification
- Domain: Bacteria
- Kingdom: Pseudomonadati
- Phylum: Bacteroidota
- Class: Flavobacteriia
- Order: Flavobacteriales
- Family: Flavobacteriaceae
- Genus: Pseudofulvibacter
- Species: P. marinus

Binomial name
- Pseudofulvibacter marinus Wang et al. 2016

Type strain
- RZW2-1

Bacterium

Pseudofulvibacter marinus is a Gram-negative, strictly aerobic, rod-shaped and non-spore-forming bacterium from the genus of Pseudofulvibacter. Pseudofulvibacter marinus has been isolated from seawater from the coast of the Yellow Sea.
