= Gaetbulibacter aquiaggeris =

Scientific classification
- Domain: Bacteria
- Kingdom: Pseudomonadati
- Phylum: Bacteroidota
- Class: Flavobacteriia
- Order: Flavobacteriales
- Family: Flavobacteriaceae
- Genus: Gaetbulibacter
- Species: G. aquiaggeris

Binomial name
- Gaetbulibacter aquiaggeris Jung et al. 2016

Type strain
- KEM-8

Bacterium

Gaetbulibacter aquiaggeris is a Gram-negative and rod-shaped bacterium from the genus Gaetbulibacter, which has been isolated from seawater from Korea.
