= Bizionia algoritergicola =

Scientific classification
- Domain: Bacteria
- Kingdom: Pseudomonadati
- Phylum: Bacteroidota
- Class: Flavobacteriia
- Order: Flavobacteriales
- Family: Flavobacteriaceae
- Genus: Bizionia
- Species: B. algoritergicola

Binomial name
- Bizionia algoritergicola Bowman and Nichols 2005

Type strain
- ACAM 1056, CIP 108533, APA-1

Synonyms
- Calefactosor algoritergicola

Species of bacterium

Bizionia algoritergicola is a species psychrophilic, gram-negative bacterium from the genus of Bizionia which has been isolated from a copepod salin pond.
