= Flavivirga amylovorans =

Scientific classification
- Domain: Bacteria
- Kingdom: Pseudomonadati
- Phylum: Bacteroidota
- Class: Flavobacteriia
- Order: Flavobacteriales
- Family: Flavobacteriaceae
- Genus: Flavivirga
- Species: F. amylovorans

Binomial name
- Flavivirga amylovorans Yi et al. 2012

Type strain
- JC2681

Species of bacterium

Flavivirga amylovorans is a Gram-negative, strictly aerobic and rod-shaped bacterium from the genus of Flavivirga which has been isolated from seawater from the Jeju Island.
