= Pseudofulvibacter geojedonensis =

Scientific classification
- Domain: Bacteria
- Kingdom: Pseudomonadati
- Phylum: Bacteroidota
- Class: Flavobacteriia
- Order: Flavobacteriales
- Family: Flavobacteriaceae
- Genus: Pseudofulvibacter
- Species: P. geojedonensis

Binomial name
- Pseudofulvibacter geojedonensis Yoon et al. 2013

Type strain
- YCS-9

Bacterium

Pseudofulvibacter geojedonensis is a Gram-negative, aerobic, rod-shaped, non-spore-forming and non-motile bacterium from the genus of Pseudofulvibacter. Pseudofulvibacter geojedonensis has been isolated from seawater from the South Sea in South Korea.
