= Flavivirga aquimarina =

Scientific classification
- Domain: Bacteria
- Kingdom: Pseudomonadati
- Phylum: Bacteroidota
- Class: Flavobacteriia
- Order: Flavobacteriales
- Family: Flavobacteriaceae
- Genus: Flavivirga
- Species: F. aquimarina

Binomial name
- Flavivirga aquimarina Lee et al. 2017

Type strain
- EC2D5

Species of bacterium

Flavivirga aquimarina is a Gram-negative, aerobic, non-spore-forming and rod-shaped bacterium from the genus of Flavivirga which has been isolated from the seaweed Ecklonia cava.
