= Olleya sediminilitoris =

Scientific classification
- Domain: Bacteria
- Kingdom: Pseudomonadati
- Phylum: Bacteroidota
- Class: Flavobacteriia
- Order: Flavobacteriales
- Family: Flavobacteriaceae
- Genus: Olleya
- Species: O. sediminilitoris

Binomial name
- Olleya sediminilitoris Park et al. 2021

Type strain
- YSTF-M6

Bacterium

Olleya sediminilitoris is a Gram-negative bacterium from the genus Olleya which has been isolated from tidal flat sediments from the Yellow Sea.
