= Confluentibacter lentus =

Scientific classification
- Domain: Bacteria
- Kingdom: Pseudomonadati
- Phylum: Bacteroidota
- Class: Flavobacteriia
- Order: Flavobacteriales
- Family: Flavobacteriaceae
- Genus: Confluentibacter
- Species: C. lentus

Binomial name
- Confluentibacter lentus Park et al. 2016

Type strain
- KCTC 42777, NBRC 111588, HJM-3

Species of bacterium

Confluentibacter lentus is a Gram-negative, aerobic and rod-shaped bacterium from the genus of Confluentibacter which has been isolated from water from Hwajinpo from the Sea of Japan.
