= Aureibaculum marinum =

Scientific classification
- Domain: Bacteria
- Kingdom: Pseudomonadati
- Phylum: Bacteroidota
- Class: Flavobacteriia
- Order: Flavobacteriales
- Family: Flavobacteriaceae
- Genus: Aureibaculum
- Species: A. marinum

Binomial name
- Aureibaculum marinum Zhao et al. 2021

Type strain
- BH-SD17

Species of bacterium

Aureibaculum marinum is a Gram-negative, aerobic and non-motile bacterium from the genus of Aureibaculum which has been isolated from marine sediments from the Bohai Gulf.
