= Flavivirga aquatica =

Scientific classification
- Domain: Bacteria
- Kingdom: Pseudomonadati
- Phylum: Bacteroidota
- Class: Flavobacteriia
- Order: Flavobacteriales
- Family: Flavobacteriaceae
- Genus: Flavivirga
- Species: F. aquatica

Binomial name
- Flavivirga aquatica (Wong et al. 2017) Li et al. 2021

Type strain
- SK-16

Synonyms
- Algibacter aquaticus

Species of bacterium

Flavivirga aquatica is a Gram-negative, aerobic and slightly alkaliphilic bacterium from the genus of Flavivirga.
