= Salinimicrobium marinum =

Scientific classification
- Domain: Bacteria
- Kingdom: Pseudomonadati
- Phylum: Bacteroidota
- Class: Flavobacteriia
- Order: Flavobacteriales
- Family: Flavobacteriaceae
- Genus: Salinimicrobium
- Species: S. marinum

Binomial name
- Salinimicrobium marinum Nedashkovskaya et al. 2010

Type strain
- KMM 6270

Bacterium

Salinimicrobium marinum is a heterotrophic and facultatively anaerobic bacterium from the genus of Salinimicrobium.
