= Olleya marilimosa =

Scientific classification
- Domain: Bacteria
- Kingdom: Pseudomonadati
- Phylum: Bacteroidota
- Class: Flavobacteriia
- Order: Flavobacteriales
- Family: Flavobacteriaceae
- Genus: Olleya
- Species: O. marilimosa

Binomial name
- Olleya marilimosa Mancuso Nichols et al. 2005

Type strain
- CAM030

Bacterium

Olleya marilimosa is a Gram-negative, aerobic and motile bacterium from the genus of Olleya which has been isolated from the Southern Ocean.
