= Salinimicrobium catena =

Scientific classification
- Domain: Bacteria
- Kingdom: Pseudomonadati
- Phylum: Bacteroidota
- Class: Flavobacteriia
- Order: Flavobacteriales
- Family: Flavobacteriaceae
- Genus: Salinimicrobium
- Species: S. catena

Binomial name
- Salinimicrobium catena (Ying et al. 2007) Lim et al. 2008

Type strain
- HY1

Synonyms
- Salegentibacter catena

Bacterium

Salinimicrobium catena is a Gram-negative, aerobic, heterotrophic and non-motile bacterium from the genus of Salinimicrobium which has been isolated from sediments oft the South China Sea.
