= Salinimicrobium soli =

Scientific classification
- Domain: Bacteria
- Kingdom: Pseudomonadati
- Phylum: Bacteroidota
- Class: Flavobacteriia
- Order: Flavobacteriales
- Family: Flavobacteriaceae
- Genus: Salinimicrobium
- Species: S. soli

Binomial name
- Salinimicrobium soli Kim et al. 2016

Type strain
- CAU 1287

Bacterium

Salinimicrobium soli is a Gram-negative, facultatively anaerobic and rod-shaped bacterium from the genus of Salinimicrobium which has been isolated from soil from reclaimed land.
