= Antarcticibacterium flavum =

Scientific classification
- Domain: Bacteria
- Kingdom: Pseudomonadati
- Phylum: Bacteroidota
- Class: Flavobacteriia
- Order: Flavobacteriales
- Family: Flavobacteriaceae
- Genus: Antarcticibacterium
- Species: A. flavum

Binomial name
- Antarcticibacterium flavum Li et al. 2018

Type strain
- JB01H24

Species of bacterium

Antarcticibacterium flavum is a Gram-negative, strictly aerobic and rod-shaped bacterium from the genus of Antarcticibacterium which has been isolated from sediments from the Ross Sea. The whole genome of Antarcticibacterium flavum is sequenced.
