= Seonamhaeicola marinus =

Scientific classification
- Domain: Bacteria
- Kingdom: Pseudomonadati
- Phylum: Bacteroidota
- Class: Flavobacteriia
- Order: Flavobacteriales
- Family: Flavobacteriaceae
- Genus: Seonamhaeicola
- Species: S. marinus

Binomial name
- Seonamhaeicola marinus Fang et al. 2017

Type strain
- B011

Bacterium

Seonamhaeicola marinus is a Gram-negative, facultatively anaerobic, rod-shaped and non-motile bacterium from the genus of Seonamhaeicola which has been isolated from the algae Gracilaria blodgettii.
