= Joostella marina =

Scientific classification
- Domain: Bacteria
- Kingdom: Pseudomonadati
- Phylum: Bacteroidota
- Class: Flavobacteriia
- Order: Flavobacteriales
- Family: Flavobacteriaceae
- Genus: Joostella
- Species: J. marina

Binomial name
- Joostella marina Quan et al. 2008

Type strain
- En5

Bacterium

Joostella marina is a Gram-negative strictly aerobic, non-spore-forming and non-motile bacterium from the genus of Joostella which has been isolated from the Sea of Japan.
