= Muriicola jejuensis =

Scientific classification
- Domain: Bacteria
- Kingdom: Pseudomonadati
- Phylum: Bacteroidota
- Class: Flavobacteriia
- Order: Flavobacteriales
- Family: Flavobacteriaceae
- Genus: Muriicola
- Species: M. jejuensis

Binomial name
- Muriicola jejuensis Kahng et al. 2010

Type strain
- EM44

Synonyms
- Muricola jejuensis

Bacterium

Muriicola jejuensis is a Gram-negative bacterium from the genus of Muriicola which has been isolated from seawater from the coast of Jeju Island. M. jujensis reduces nitrate to nitrite and is catalase and oxidase positive. The species is non-motile. The species produces carotenoid pigments with zeaxanthin as a principal component.
