= Salinimicrobium sediminis =

Scientific classification
- Domain: Bacteria
- Kingdom: Pseudomonadati
- Phylum: Bacteroidota
- Class: Flavobacteriia
- Order: Flavobacteriales
- Family: Flavobacteriaceae
- Genus: Salinimicrobium
- Species: S. sediminis

Binomial name
- Salinimicrobium sediminis Subhash et al. 2014

Type strain
- JC207

Bacterium

Salinimicrobium sediminis is a Gram-negative bacterium from the genus of Salinimicrobium which has been isolated from deep-sea sediments.
