= Psychroserpens burtonensis =

Scientific classification
- Domain: Bacteria
- Kingdom: Pseudomonadati
- Phylum: Bacteroidota
- Class: Flavobacteriia
- Order: Flavobacteriales
- Family: Flavobacteriaceae
- Genus: Psychroserpens
- Species: P. burtonensis

Binomial name
- Psychroserpens burtonensis Bowman et al. 1997

Species of bacterium

Psychroserpens burtonensis is a species of psychrophilic, yellow-pigmented bacteria. It is non-motile and nutritionally fastidious. Its type strain is ACAM 188.
