= Wocania ichthyoenteri =

Scientific classification
- Domain: Bacteria
- Kingdom: Pseudomonadati
- Phylum: Bacteroidota
- Class: Flavobacteriia
- Order: Flavobacteriales
- Family: Flavobacteriaceae
- Genus: Wocania
- Species: W. ichthyoenteri

Binomial name
- Wocania ichthyoenteri (Zhang et al. 2013) He et al. 2020

Synonyms
- Flaviramulus ichthyoenteri

Bacterium

Wocania ichthyoenteri is a Gram-negative, strictly aerobic and rod-shaped bacterium from the genus of Wocania which has been isolated from the intestine of the fish Paralichthys olivaceus.
