= Salinimicrobium flavum =

Scientific classification
- Domain: Bacteria
- Kingdom: Pseudomonadati
- Phylum: Bacteroidota
- Class: Flavobacteriia
- Order: Flavobacteriales
- Family: Flavobacteriaceae
- Genus: Salinimicrobium
- Species: S. flavum

Binomial name
- Salinimicrobium flavum Zhang et al. 2017

Type strain
- X7

Synonyms
- Salinimicrobium flavus

Bacterium

Salinimicrobium flavum is a Gram-negative, facultatively anaerobic and rod-shaped bacterium from the genus of Salinimicrobium which has been isolated from marine sediments from the coast of Weihai.
