= Flavimarina pacifica =

Scientific classification
- Domain: Bacteria
- Kingdom: Pseudomonadati
- Phylum: Bacteroidota
- Class: Flavobacteriia
- Order: Flavobacteriales
- Family: Flavobacteriaceae
- Genus: Flavimarina
- Species: F. pacifica

Binomial name
- Flavimarina pacifica Nedashkovskaya et al. 2015

Type strain
- IDSW-73

Species of bacterium

Flavimarina pacifica is a Gram-negative, facultatively anaerobic and rod-shaped bacterium from the genus of Flavimarina which has been isolated from seawater.
