= Snuella sedimenti =

Scientific classification
- Domain: Bacteria
- Kingdom: Pseudomonadati
- Phylum: Bacteroidota
- Class: Flavobacteriia
- Order: Flavobacteriales
- Family: Flavobacteriaceae
- Genus: Snuella
- Species: S. sedimenti

Binomial name
- Snuella sedimenti Kim et al. 2021

Type strain
- CAU 1569

Bacterium

Snuella sedimenti is a Gram-negative, aerobic, rod-shaped and motile bacterium from the genus of Snuella which has been isolated from marine sediments from the Shodo Island.
