= Mangrovimonas xylaniphaga =

Scientific classification
- Domain: Bacteria
- Kingdom: Pseudomonadati
- Phylum: Bacteroidota
- Class: Flavobacteriia
- Order: Flavobacteriales
- Family: Flavobacteriaceae
- Genus: Mangrovimonas
- Species: M. xylaniphaga

Binomial name
- Mangrovimonas xylaniphaga Dinesh et al. 2017

Type strain
- ST2L12

Bacterium

Mangrovimonas xylaniphaga is a bacterium from the genus of Mangrovimonas which has been isolated from mangrove sediments from the Matang Mangrove Forest in Perak.
