= Seonamhaeicola acroporae =

Scientific classification
- Domain: Bacteria
- Kingdom: Pseudomonadati
- Phylum: Bacteroidota
- Class: Flavobacteriia
- Order: Flavobacteriales
- Family: Flavobacteriaceae
- Genus: Seonamhaeicola
- Species: S. acroporae

Binomial name
- Seonamhaeicola acroporae Yoon et al. 2020

Type strain
- 3KA7-17

Bacterium

Seonamhaeicola acroporae is a Gram-negative, strictly aerobic and non-motile bacterium from the genus of Seonamhaeicola which has been isolated from the coral Acropora formosa from Japan.
