= Joostella atrarenae =

Scientific classification
- Domain: Bacteria
- Kingdom: Pseudomonadati
- Phylum: Bacteroidota
- Class: Flavobacteriia
- Order: Flavobacteriales
- Family: Flavobacteriaceae
- Genus: Joostella
- Species: J. atrarenae

Binomial name
- Joostella atrarenae Kim et al. 2011

Type strain
- M1-2

Bacterium

Joostella atrarenae is a Gram-negative and motile bacterium from the genus of Joostella which has been isolated from black sea sand from the Jeju Island.
