= Flaviramulus basaltis =

Scientific classification
- Domain: Bacteria
- Kingdom: Pseudomonadati
- Phylum: Bacteroidota
- Class: Flavobacteriia
- Order: Flavobacteriales
- Family: Flavobacteriaceae
- Genus: Flaviramulus
- Species: F. basaltis

Binomial name
- Flaviramulus basaltis Einen and Øvreås 2006

Bacterium

Flaviramulus basaltis is a Gram-negative and motile bacterium from the genus of Flaviramulus.
