= Aurantibacter aestuarii =

Scientific classification
- Domain: Bacteria
- Kingdom: Pseudomonadati
- Phylum: Bacteroidota
- Class: Flavobacteriia
- Order: Flavobacteriales
- Family: Flavobacteriaceae
- Genus: Aurantibacter
- Species: A. aestuarii

Binomial name
- Aurantibacter aestuarii (Lee et al. 2014) García-López et al. 2020

Type strain
- KYW614

Synonyms
- Mesoflavibacter aestuarii

Species of bacterium

Aurantibacter aestuarii is a Gram-negative, aerobic and rod-shaped bacterium from the genus of Aurantibacter which has been isolated from seawater from the Gwangyang Bay.
