= Aestuariibaculum scopimerae =

Scientific classification
- Domain: Bacteria
- Kingdom: Pseudomonadati
- Phylum: Bacteroidota
- Class: Flavobacteriia
- Order: Flavobacteriales
- Family: Flavobacteriaceae
- Genus: Aestuariibaculum
- Species: A. scopimerae

Binomial name
- Aestuariibaculum scopimerae Lee et al. 2013

Type strain
- I-15, JCM 19486, KCTC 32459

Species of bacterium

Aestuariibaculum scopimerae is a Gram-negative and non-motile bacterium from the genus of Aestuariibaculum which has been isolated from a crab from the Yellow Sea on Korea.
