= Sinomicrobium soli =

Scientific classification
- Domain: Bacteria
- Kingdom: Pseudomonadati
- Phylum: Bacteroidota
- Class: Flavobacteriia
- Order: Flavobacteriales
- Family: Flavobacteriaceae
- Genus: Sinomicrobium
- Species: S. soli

Binomial name
- Sinomicrobium soli Liu et al. 2019

Type strain
- N-1-3-6

Bacterium

Sinomicrobium soli is a Gram-negative bacterium from the genus of Sinomicrobium which has been isolated from soil from the arctic.
