= Seonamhaeicola sediminis =

Scientific classification
- Domain: Bacteria
- Kingdom: Pseudomonadati
- Phylum: Bacteroidota
- Class: Flavobacteriia
- Order: Flavobacteriales
- Family: Flavobacteriaceae
- Genus: Seonamhaeicola
- Species: S. sediminis

Binomial name
- Seonamhaeicola sediminis Zhang et al. 2020

Type strain
- W255

Bacterium

Seonamhaeicola sediminis is a Gram-negative and facultatively anaerobic bacterium from the genus of Seonamhaeicola which has been isolated from marine sediments from the Xiaoshi Island from China.
