= Flavicella sediminum =

Scientific classification
- Domain: Bacteria
- Kingdom: Pseudomonadati
- Phylum: Bacteroidota
- Class: Flavobacteriia
- Order: Flavobacteriales
- Family: Flavobacteriaceae
- Genus: Flavicella
- Species: F. sediminum

Binomial name
- Flavicella sediminum Hu et al. 2020

Type strain
- ALS 84

Species of bacterium

Flavicella sediminum is a Gram-negative, rod-shaped, aerobic and motile bacterium from the genus of Flavicella which has been isolated from marine sediments from the Ailian bay in China.
