= Xanthomarina spongicola =

Scientific classification
- Domain: Bacteria
- Kingdom: Pseudomonadati
- Phylum: Bacteroidota
- Class: Flavobacteriia
- Order: Flavobacteriales
- Family: Flavobacteriaceae
- Genus: Xanthomarina
- Species: X. spongicola

Binomial name
- Xanthomarina spongicola (Yoon and Oh 2011) García-López et al. 2020

Type strain
- A2

Synonyms
- Formosa spongicola

Bacterium

Xanthomarina spongicola is a Gram-negative, strictly aerobic, rod-shaped and non-motile bacterium from the genus of Xanthomarina which has been isolated from the sponge Hymeniacidon flavia from the coast of Jeju Island.
