= Mesoflavibacter zeaxanthinifaciens =

Scientific classification
- Domain: Bacteria
- Kingdom: Pseudomonadati
- Phylum: Bacteroidota
- Class: Flavobacteriia
- Order: Flavobacteriales
- Family: Flavobacteriaceae
- Genus: Mesoflavibacter
- Species: M. zeaxanthinifaciens

Binomial name
- Mesoflavibacter zeaxanthinifaciens Asker et al. 2008

Type strain
- ZX30

Subspecies
- Subspecies; Mesoflavibacter zeaxanthinifaciens subsp. sabulilitoris Mesoflavibacter zeaxanthinifaciens subsp. zeaxanthinifaciens

Bacterium

Mesoflavibacter zeaxanthinifaciens is a Gram-negative, strictly aerobic, rod-shaped, halophilic and mesophilic bacterium from the genus of Mesoflavibacter. Mesoflavibacter zeaxanthinifaciens produces zeaxanthin.
