= Salinimicrobium gaetbulicola =

Scientific classification
- Domain: Bacteria
- Kingdom: Pseudomonadati
- Phylum: Bacteroidota
- Class: Flavobacteriia
- Order: Flavobacteriales
- Family: Flavobacteriaceae
- Genus: Salinimicrobium
- Species: S. gaetbulicola

Binomial name
- Salinimicrobium gaetbulicola Lee et al. 2012

Type strain
- BB-My20

Bacterium

Salinimicrobium gaetbulicola is a Gram-negative and aerobic bacterium from the genus of Salinimicrobium which has been isolated from tidal flat sediments from the coast of Korea.
