= Eudoraea adriatica =

Scientific classification
- Domain: Bacteria
- Kingdom: Pseudomonadati
- Phylum: Bacteroidota
- Class: Flavobacteriia
- Order: Flavobacteriales
- Family: Flavobacteriaceae
- Genus: Eudoraea
- Species: E. adriatica

Binomial name
- Eudoraea adriatica Alain et al. 2008

Type strain
- AS06/20a

Species of bacterium

Eudoraea adriatica is a Gram-negative, aerobic and non-motile bacterium from the genus of Eudoraea which has been isolated from water from the coast of the Adriatic Sea.
