= Sinomicrobium oceani =

Scientific classification
- Domain: Bacteria
- Kingdom: Pseudomonadati
- Phylum: Bacteroidota
- Class: Flavobacteriia
- Order: Flavobacteriales
- Family: Flavobacteriaceae
- Genus: Sinomicrobium
- Species: S. oceani

Binomial name
- Sinomicrobium oceani Xu et al. 2013

Type strain
- SCSIO 03483

Bacterium

Sinomicrobium oceani is a bacterium from the genus of Sinomicrobium which has been isolated from marine sediments from the Nansha Islands.
