= Flavivirga rizhaonensis =

Scientific classification
- Domain: Bacteria
- Kingdom: Pseudomonadati
- Phylum: Bacteroidota
- Class: Flavobacteriia
- Order: Flavobacteriales
- Family: Flavobacteriaceae
- Genus: Flavivirga
- Species: F. rizhaonensis

Binomial name
- Flavivirga rizhaonensis Liu et al. 2020

Type strain
- RZ03

Species of bacterium

Flavivirga rizhaonensis is a Gram-negative and aerobic bacterium from the genus of Flavivirga which has been isolated from sand from the Yellow Sea.
