= Sediminicola arcticus =

Scientific classification
- Domain: Bacteria
- Kingdom: Pseudomonadati
- Phylum: Bacteroidota
- Class: Flavobacteriia
- Order: Flavobacteriales
- Family: Flavobacteriaceae
- Genus: Sediminicola
- Species: S. arcticus

Binomial name
- Sediminicola arcticus Hwang et al. 2015

Type strain
- PAMC 27266

Synonyms
- Sediminicola arcicus

Bacterium

Sediminicola arcticus is a Gram-negative, psychrophilic, rod-shaped and non-motile bacterium from the genus of Sediminicola which has been isolated from deep-sea sediments from the Arctic Ocean.
