= Aureibaculum flavum =

Scientific classification
- Domain: Bacteria
- Kingdom: Pseudomonadati
- Phylum: Bacteroidota
- Class: Flavobacteriia
- Order: Flavobacteriales
- Family: Flavobacteriaceae
- Genus: Aureibaculum
- Species: A. flavum

Binomial name
- Aureibaculum flavum He et al. 2022

Type strain
- SM1352

Species of bacterium

Aureibaculum flavum is a Gram-negative, aerobic, rod-shaped and non-motile bacterium from the genus of Aureibaculum.
