= Mangrovimonas yunxiaonensis =

Scientific classification
- Domain: Bacteria
- Kingdom: Pseudomonadati
- Phylum: Bacteroidota
- Class: Flavobacteriia
- Order: Flavobacteriales
- Family: Flavobacteriaceae
- Genus: Mangrovimonas
- Species: M. yunxiaonensis

Binomial name
- Mangrovimonas yunxiaonensis Li et al. 2013

Type strain
- LYYY01

Synonyms
- Mangsedibacter yunxiaoensis

Bacterium

Mangrovimonas yunxiaonensis is a Gram-negative and short-rod-shaped bacterium from the genus of Mangrovimonas which has been isolated from mangrove sediments from the Yunxiao mangrove National Nature Reserve in China.
