= Croceitalea litorea =

Scientific classification
- Domain: Bacteria
- Kingdom: Pseudomonadati
- Phylum: Bacteroidota
- Class: Flavobacteriia
- Order: Flavobacteriales
- Family: Flavobacteriaceae
- Genus: Croceitalea
- Species: C. litorea

Binomial name
- Croceitalea litorea Kim et al. 2015

Type strain
- JCM 19531, KACC 17669, strain CBA3205

Species of bacterium

Croceitalea litorea is a Gram-negative, rod-shaped and non-motile bacterium from the genus of Croceitalea which has been isolated from seashore sand from the Jeju Island in Korea.
