= Siansivirga zeaxanthinifaciens =

Scientific classification
- Domain: Bacteria
- Kingdom: Pseudomonadati
- Phylum: Bacteroidota
- Class: Flavobacteriia
- Order: Flavobacteriales
- Family: Flavobacteriaceae
- Genus: Siansivirga
- Species: S. zeaxanthinifaciens

Binomial name
- Siansivirga zeaxanthinifaciens Hameed et al. 2013

Type strain
- CC-SAMT-1

Synonyms
- Gaetbulibacter zeaxanthinifaciens

Bacterium

Siansivirga zeaxanthinifaciens is a Gram-negative, strictly aerobic and rod-shaped bacterium from the genus of Siansivirga which has been isolated from seawater from the coast of the China Sea in Taiwan.
