= Euzebyella marina =

Scientific classification
- Domain: Bacteria
- Kingdom: Pseudomonadati
- Phylum: Bacteroidota
- Class: Flavobacteriia
- Order: Flavobacteriales
- Family: Flavobacteriaceae
- Genus: Euzebyella
- Species: E. marina

Binomial name
- Euzebyella marina Zhang et al. 2017

Type strain
- CY01

Species of bacterium

Euzebyella marina is a Gram-negative and aerobic bacterium from the genus of Euzebyella which has been isolated from seawater from the Yellow Sea.
