= Mesoflavibacter profundi =

Scientific classification
- Domain: Bacteria
- Kingdom: Pseudomonadati
- Phylum: Bacteroidota
- Class: Flavobacteriia
- Order: Flavobacteriales
- Family: Flavobacteriaceae
- Genus: Mesoflavibacter
- Species: M. profundi

Binomial name
- Mesoflavibacter profundi Wang et al. 2018

Type strain
- YC1039

Bacterium

Mesoflavibacter profundi is a Gram-negative, aerobic and rod-shaped bacterium from the genus of Mesoflavibacter which has been isolated from a seamount from the northern Mariana Trench.
