= Croceitalea marina =

Scientific classification
- Domain: Bacteria
- Kingdom: Pseudomonadati
- Phylum: Bacteroidota
- Class: Flavobacteriia
- Order: Flavobacteriales
- Family: Flavobacteriaceae
- Genus: Croceitalea
- Species: C. marina

Binomial name
- Croceitalea marina Su et al. 2017

Type strain
- KCTC 52368, MCCC 1K03229, strain H01-35

Species of bacterium

Croceitalea marina is a Gram-negative, rod-shaped and non-motile bacterium from the genus of Croceitalea which has been isolated from the Yellow Sea in China.
