= Marinirhabdus citrea =

Scientific classification
- Domain: Bacteria
- Kingdom: Pseudomonadati
- Phylum: Bacteroidota
- Class: Flavobacteriia
- Order: Flavobacteriales
- Family: Flavobacteriaceae
- Genus: Marinirhabdus
- Species: M. citrea

Binomial name
- Marinirhabdus citrea Yang et al. 2018

Type strain
- MEBiC09412

Synonyms
- Marinirhabdus citreus

Bacterium

Marinirhabdus citrea is a Gram-negative, aerobic, rod-shaped and non-motile bacterium from the genus of Marinirhabdus which has been isolated from seaweed from Yeonggwang County.
