= Salinimicrobium nanhaiense =

Scientific classification
- Domain: Bacteria
- Kingdom: Pseudomonadati
- Phylum: Bacteroidota
- Class: Flavobacteriia
- Order: Flavobacteriales
- Family: Flavobacteriaceae
- Genus: Salinimicrobium
- Species: S. nanhaiense

Binomial name
- Salinimicrobium nanhaiense Cao et al. 2020

Type strain
- J15B81-2

Bacterium

Salinimicrobium nanhaiense is a Gram-negative, facultatively anaerobic and rod-shaped bacterium from the genus of Salinimicrobium which has been isolated from sediments from the South China Sea.
