= Flavimarina flava =

Scientific classification
- Domain: Bacteria
- Kingdom: Pseudomonadati
- Phylum: Bacteroidota
- Class: Flavobacteriia
- Order: Flavobacteriales
- Family: Flavobacteriaceae
- Genus: Flavimarina
- Species: F. flava

Binomial name
- Flavimarina flava Cho et al. 2017

Type strain
- MBLN091

Species of bacterium

Flavimarina flava is a Gram-negative, aerobic, rod-shaped, non-spore-forming and motile bacterium from the genus of Flavimarina which has been isolated from the plant Salicornia herbacea from the Yellow Sea.
