= Patiriisocius marinistellae =

Scientific classification
- Domain: Bacteria
- Kingdom: Pseudomonadati
- Phylum: Bacteroidota
- Class: Flavobacteriia
- Order: Flavobacteriales
- Family: Flavobacteriaceae
- Genus: Patiriisocius
- Species: P. marinistellae

Binomial name
- Patiriisocius marinistellae Kawano et al. 2020

Type strain
- KK4

Bacterium

Patiriisocius marinistellae is a Gram-negative, aerobic, rod-shaped and non-spore-forming bacterium from the genus of Patiriisocius which has been isolated from the surface of the starfish Patiria pectinifera from the coast of Hokkaido.
