= Confluentibacter citreus =

Scientific classification
- Domain: Bacteria
- Kingdom: Pseudomonadati
- Phylum: Bacteroidota
- Class: Flavobacteriia
- Order: Flavobacteriales
- Family: Flavobacteriaceae
- Genus: Confluentibacter
- Species: C. citreus

Binomial name
- Confluentibacter citreus Han et al. 2017

Type strain
- XJNY, KCTC 52638, MCCC 1H00183

Synonyms
- Confluentibacter citreum

Species of bacterium

Confluentibacter citreus is a Gram-negative, aerobic and rod-shaped bacterium from the genus of Confluentibacter which has been isolated from the Sayram Lake in China.
