= Marinirhabdus gelatinilytica =

Scientific classification
- Domain: Bacteria
- Kingdom: Pseudomonadati
- Phylum: Bacteroidota
- Class: Flavobacteriia
- Order: Flavobacteriales
- Family: Flavobacteriaceae
- Genus: Marinirhabdus
- Species: M. gelatinilytica

Binomial name
- Marinirhabdus gelatinilytica Wu et al. 2016

Type strain
- NH83

Bacterium

Marinirhabdus gelatinilytica is a Gram-negative, aerobic, slightly halophilic, rod-shaped and non-motile bacterium from the genus of Marinirhabdus which has been isolated from the South China Sea.
