= Seonamhaeicola maritimus =

Scientific classification
- Domain: Bacteria
- Kingdom: Pseudomonadati
- Phylum: Bacteroidota
- Class: Flavobacteriia
- Order: Flavobacteriales
- Family: Flavobacteriaceae
- Genus: Seonamhaeicola
- Species: S. maritimus

Binomial name
- Seonamhaeicola maritimus Cao et al. 2020

Type strain
- 1505

Bacterium

Seonamhaeicola maritimus is a Gram-negative, facultatively anaerobic, rod-shaped and non-motile bacterium from the genus of Seonamhaeicola which has been isolated from marine sediments from the coast of Weihai.
