= Mangrovimonas spongiae =

Scientific classification
- Domain: Bacteria
- Kingdom: Pseudomonadati
- Phylum: Bacteroidota
- Class: Flavobacteriia
- Order: Flavobacteriales
- Family: Flavobacteriaceae
- Genus: Mangrovimonas
- Species: M. spongiae

Binomial name
- Mangrovimonas spongiae Zhuang et al. 2020

Type strain
- HN-E26

Bacterium

Mangrovimonas spongiae is a Gram-negative, rod-shaped and motile bacterium from the genus of Mangrovimonas which has been isolated from a marine sponge from the Yangpu Bay in China.
