= Robertkochia solimangrovi =

Scientific classification
- Domain: Bacteria
- Kingdom: Pseudomonadati
- Phylum: Bacteroidota
- Class: Flavobacteriia
- Order: Flavobacteriales
- Family: Flavobacteriaceae
- Genus: Robertkochia
- Species: R. solimangrovi

Binomial name
- Robertkochia solimangrovi Lam et al. 2020

Type strain
- CL23

Bacterium

Robertkochia solimangrovi is a Gram-negative and strictly aerobic bacterium from the genus of Robertkochia which has been isolated from mangrove soil from the Malaysia Tanjung Piai National Park.
