= Aurantibacter crassamenti =

Scientific classification
- Domain: Bacteria
- Kingdom: Pseudomonadati
- Phylum: Bacteroidota
- Class: Flavobacteriia
- Order: Flavobacteriales
- Family: Flavobacteriaceae
- Genus: Aurantibacter
- Species: A. crassamenti

Binomial name
- Aurantibacter crassamenti Yoon and Kasai 2017

Type strain
- HG732

Species of bacterium

Aurantibacter crassamenti is a Gram-negative, strictly aerobic, chemoheterotrophic and rod-shaped bacterium from the genus of Aurantibacter which has been isolated from marine sediments from Japan.
