= Muriicola marianensis =

Scientific classification
- Domain: Bacteria
- Kingdom: Pseudomonadati
- Phylum: Bacteroidota
- Class: Flavobacteriia
- Order: Flavobacteriales
- Family: Flavobacteriaceae
- Genus: Muriicola
- Species: M. lacisalsi

Binomial name
- Muriicola lacisalsi Hu et al. 2015

Type strain
- A6B8

Bacterium

Muriicola marianensis is a Gram-negative, aerobic, rod-shaped and non-motile bacterium from the genus of Muriicola which has been isolated from seawater from the Mariana Trench. M. marianensis produces catalase, oxidase, and H_{2}S gas. The type strain is sensitive to bacitracin, gentamicin, kanamycin, neomycin, polymixin B, and streptomycin. Colonies on marine agar are convex, orange, and circular.
