= Gaetbulibacter aestuarii =

Scientific classification
- Domain: Bacteria
- Kingdom: Pseudomonadati
- Phylum: Bacteroidota
- Class: Flavobacteriia
- Order: Flavobacteriales
- Family: Flavobacteriaceae
- Genus: Gaetbulibacter
- Species: G. aestuarii

Binomial name
- Gaetbulibacter aestuarii Park et al. 2012

Type strain
- KYW382

Bacterium

Gaetbulibacter aestuarii is a Gram-negative, aerobic and rod-shaped bacterium from the genus of Gaetbulibacter which has been isolated from seawater from the South South Sea in Korea.
