= Snuella lapsa =

Scientific classification
- Domain: Bacteria
- Kingdom: Pseudomonadati
- Phylum: Bacteroidota
- Class: Flavobacteriia
- Order: Flavobacteriales
- Family: Flavobacteriaceae
- Genus: Snuella
- Species: S. lapsa

Binomial name
- Snuella lapsa Yi and Chun 2011

Type strain
- JC2132

Bacterium

Snuella lapsa is a Gram-negative, aerobic and rod-shaped bacterium from the genus of Snuella which has been isolated from tidal flat sediments from the Ganghwa Island.
