= Eudoraea chungangensis =

Scientific classification
- Domain: Bacteria
- Kingdom: Pseudomonadati
- Phylum: Bacteroidota
- Class: Flavobacteriia
- Order: Flavobacteriales
- Family: Flavobacteriaceae
- Genus: Eudoraea
- Species: E. chungangensis

Binomial name
- Eudoraea chungangensis Siamphan et al. 2015

Type strain
- CAU 1296

Species of bacterium

Eudoraea chungangensis is a Gram-negative, strictly aerobic, non-spore-forming and non-motile bacterium from the genus of Eudoraea which has been isolated from waste water sludge from an aquafarm.
