= Robertkochia marina =

Scientific classification
- Domain: Bacteria
- Kingdom: Pseudomonadati
- Phylum: Bacteroidota
- Class: Flavobacteriia
- Order: Flavobacteriales
- Family: Flavobacteriaceae
- Genus: Robertkochia
- Species: R. marina

Binomial name
- Robertkochia marina Hameed et al. 2014

Type strain
- CC-AMO-30D

Bacterium

Robertkochia marina is a Gram-negative, strictly aerobic, rod-shaped, non-spore-forming and motile bacterium from the genus of Robertkochia. Robertkochia marina has been isolated from surface seawater near the Taichung harbour in Taiwan.
