= Olleya aquimaris =

Scientific classification
- Domain: Bacteria
- Kingdom: Pseudomonadati
- Phylum: Bacteroidota
- Class: Flavobacteriia
- Order: Flavobacteriales
- Family: Flavobacteriaceae
- Genus: Olleya
- Species: O. aquimaris

Binomial name
- Olleya aquimaris Lee et al. 2010

Type strain
- L-4

Bacterium

Olleya aquimaris is a Gram-negative and motile bacterium from the genus of Olleya which has been isolated from seawater from the Baekdo harbour from the Sea of Japan.
