= Flavicella marina =

Scientific classification
- Domain: Bacteria
- Kingdom: Pseudomonadati
- Phylum: Bacteroidota
- Class: Flavobacteriia
- Order: Flavobacteriales
- Family: Flavobacteriaceae
- Genus: Flavicella
- Species: F. marina

Binomial name
- Flavicella marina Teramoto and Nishijima 2015

Type strain
- 2A-7

Species of bacterium

Flavicella marina is a Gram-negative, mesophilic, rod-shaped, aerobic and non-motile bacterium from the genus of Flavicella which has been isolated from surface seawater near Muroto, Japan. Flavicella marina produces carotenoid.
