= Xanthomarina gelatinilytica =

Scientific classification
- Domain: Bacteria
- Kingdom: Pseudomonadati
- Phylum: Bacteroidota
- Class: Flavobacteriia
- Order: Flavobacteriales
- Family: Flavobacteriaceae
- Genus: Xanthomarina
- Species: X. gelatinilytica

Binomial name
- Xanthomarina gelatinilytica Vaidya et al. 2015

Type strain
- AK20

Bacterium

Xanthomarina gelatinilytica is a Gram-negative, rod-shaped, non-spore-forming and non-motile bacterium from the genus of Xanthomarina which has been isolated from seawater from Kōchi City.
