= Gaetbulibacter lutimaris =

Scientific classification
- Domain: Bacteria
- Kingdom: Pseudomonadati
- Phylum: Bacteroidota
- Class: Flavobacteriia
- Order: Flavobacteriales
- Family: Flavobacteriaceae
- Genus: Gaetbulibacter
- Species: G. lutimaris

Binomial name
- Gaetbulibacter lutimaris Yoon et al. 2013

Type strain
- D1-y4

Synonyms
- Gaetbulibacter aquimaris

Bacterium

Gaetbulibacter lutimaris is a Gram-negative, rod-shaped and aerobic bacterium from the genus of Gaetbulibacter which has been isolated from sediments of tidal flat from the South Sea in Korea.
