= Salinimicrobium terrae =

Scientific classification
- Domain: Bacteria
- Kingdom: Pseudomonadati
- Phylum: Bacteroidota
- Class: Flavobacteriia
- Order: Flavobacteriales
- Family: Flavobacteriaceae
- Genus: Salinimicrobium
- Species: S. terrae

Binomial name
- Salinimicrobium terrae Chen et al. 2008

Type strain
- YIM-C338

Bacterium

Salinimicrobium terrae is a Gram-negative, obligately aerobic, non-spore-forming, slightly halophilic and non-motile bacterium from the genus of Salinimicrobium which has been isolated from saline soil from the Qaidam Basin in China.
