= Frondibacter aureus =

Scientific classification
- Domain: Bacteria
- Kingdom: Pseudomonadati
- Phylum: Bacteroidota
- Class: Flavobacteriia
- Order: Flavobacteriales
- Family: Flavobacteriaceae
- Genus: Frondibacter
- Species: F. aureus

Binomial name
- Frondibacter aureus Yoon et al. 2015

Type strain
- A5Q-67

Species of bacterium

Frondibacter aureus is a Gram-negative, facultatively anaerobic, rod-shaped and non-motile bacterium from the genus of Frondibacter which has been isolated from leaf litter from the Nakama River.
