= S. flava =

S. flava may refer to:

- Saonia flava, a marine bacterium from the genus of Saonia and the family of Flavobacteriaceae
- Sarracenia flava, the Yellow pitcher plant, a carnivorous plant species found from Alabama to South Carolina in the United States
- Suillia flava, a fly species found in Europe
- Sphingopyxis flava, a bacterial species from the genus of Sphingopyxis

== See also ==
- Flava (disambiguation)
