= Euzebyella saccharophila =

Scientific classification
- Domain: Bacteria
- Kingdom: Pseudomonadati
- Phylum: Bacteroidota
- Class: Flavobacteriia
- Order: Flavobacteriales
- Family: Flavobacteriaceae
- Genus: Euzebyella
- Species: E. saccharophila

Binomial name
- Euzebyella saccharophila Lucena et al. 2010

Type strain
- 7SM30

Species of bacterium

Euzebyella saccharophila is a Gram-negative, aerobic and heterotrophic bacterium from the genus of Euzebyella which has been isolated from seawater from Castellón in Spain.
