= Siansivirga jejuensis =

Scientific classification
- Domain: Bacteria
- Kingdom: Pseudomonadati
- Phylum: Bacteroidota
- Class: Flavobacteriia
- Order: Flavobacteriales
- Family: Flavobacteriaceae
- Genus: Siansivirga
- Species: S. jejuensis

Binomial name
- Siansivirga jejuensis Park et al. 2015

Synonyms
- Siansivirga jejunensis

Bacterium

Siansivirga jejuensis is a bacterium from the genus of Siansivirga which has been isolated from seawater from the Jeju Island.
