= Euzebyella algicola =

Scientific classification
- Domain: Bacteria
- Kingdom: Pseudomonadati
- Phylum: Bacteroidota
- Class: Flavobacteriia
- Order: Flavobacteriales
- Family: Flavobacteriaceae
- Genus: Euzebyella
- Species: E. algicola

Binomial name
- Euzebyella algicola Kwon et al. 2018

Type strain
- MEBiC 12267

Species of bacterium

Euzebyella algicola is a Gram-negative, aerobic and rod-shaped bacterium from the genus of Euzebyella which has been isolated from a green algae from the Jeju Island.
