= Seonamhaeicola algicola =

Scientific classification
- Domain: Bacteria
- Kingdom: Pseudomonadati
- Phylum: Bacteroidota
- Class: Flavobacteriia
- Order: Flavobacteriales
- Family: Flavobacteriaceae
- Genus: Seonamhaeicola
- Species: S. algicola

Binomial name
- Seonamhaeicola algicola Zhou et al. 2016

Type strain
- Gy8

Bacterium

Seonamhaeicola algicola is a Gram-negative, facultatively anaerobic and rod-shaped bacterium from the genus of Seonamhaeicola which has been isolated from the algae Gracilaria blodgettii.
