= Seonamhaeicola aphaedonensis =

Scientific classification
- Domain: Bacteria
- Kingdom: Pseudomonadati
- Phylum: Bacteroidota
- Class: Flavobacteriia
- Order: Flavobacteriales
- Family: Flavobacteriaceae
- Genus: Seonamhaeicola
- Species: S. aphaedonensis

Binomial name
- Seonamhaeicola aphaedonensis Park et al. 2014

Type strain
- AH-M5

Bacterium

Seonamhaeicola aphaedonensis is a Gram-negative, rod-shaped and non-motile bacterium from the genus of Seonamhaeicola which has been isolated from tidal flat sediments from the Aphae Island.
