= Muriicola soli =

Scientific classification
- Domain: Bacteria
- Kingdom: Pseudomonadati
- Phylum: Bacteroidota
- Class: Flavobacteriia
- Order: Flavobacteriales
- Family: Flavobacteriaceae
- Genus: Muriicola
- Species: M. soli

Binomial name
- Muriicola soli Kang et al. 2021

Type strain
- MMS17-SY002

Bacterium

Muriicola soli is a Gram-negative, aerobic, rod-shaped and non-motile bacterium from the genus of Muriicola which has been isolated from soil from an island. The species produces catalase, oxidase, and H_{2}S gas.
