= Antarcticibacterium arcticum =

Scientific classification
- Domain: Bacteria
- Kingdom: Pseudomonadati
- Phylum: Bacteroidota
- Class: Flavobacteriia
- Order: Flavobacteriales
- Family: Flavobacteriaceae
- Genus: Antarcticibacterium
- Species: A. arcticum

Binomial name
- Antarcticibacterium arcticum Lee et al. 2020

Type strain
- PAMC 28998

Species of bacterium

Antarcticibacterium arcticum is a Gram-negative, aerobic rod-shaped and non-motile bacterium from the genus of Antarcticibacterium which has been isolated from surface sediments from the Beaufort Sea. A. arcticum is oxidase and catalase positive.
