= Subsaximicrobium wynnwilliamsii =

Scientific classification
- Domain: Bacteria
- Kingdom: Pseudomonadati
- Phylum: Bacteroidota
- Class: Flavobacteriia
- Order: Flavobacteriales
- Family: Flavobacteriaceae
- Genus: Subsaximicrobium
- Species: S. wynnwilliamsii

Binomial name
- Subsaximicrobium wynnwilliamsii Bowman and Nichols 2005

Bacterium

Subsaximicrobium wynnwilliamsii is a bacterium from the genus of Subsaximicrobium.
