= Robertkochia sediminum =

Scientific classification
- Domain: Bacteria
- Kingdom: Pseudomonadati
- Phylum: Bacteroidota
- Class: Flavobacteriia
- Order: Flavobacteriales
- Family: Flavobacteriaceae
- Genus: Robertkochia
- Species: R. sediminum

Binomial name
- Robertkochia sediminum Ma et al. 2022

Type strain
- 1368

Bacterium

Robertkochia sediminum is a Gram-negative, strictly aerobic and rod-shaped bacterium from the genus of Robertkochia which has been isolated from coastal sediments from the Xiaoshi Island from China.
