= Frondibacter mangrovi =

Scientific classification
- Domain: Bacteria
- Kingdom: Pseudomonadati
- Phylum: Bacteroidota
- Class: Flavobacteriia
- Order: Flavobacteriales
- Family: Flavobacteriaceae
- Genus: Frondibacter
- Species: F. mangrovi

Binomial name
- Frondibacter mangrovi Yoon et al. 2017

Type strain
- 02OK1/10-76

Species of bacterium

Frondibacter mangrovi is a Gram-negative, chemoheterotrophic, strictly aerobic, rod-shaped and non-motile bacterium from the genus of Frondibacter which has been isolated from a mangrove estuary in Japan.
