= Mesoflavibacter sabulilitoris =

Scientific classification
- Domain: Bacteria
- Kingdom: Pseudomonadati
- Phylum: Bacteroidota
- Class: Flavobacteriia
- Order: Flavobacteriales
- Family: Flavobacteriaceae
- Genus: Mesoflavibacter
- Species: M. sabulilitoris

Binomial name
- Mesoflavibacter sabulilitoris Park et al. 2014

Type strain
- GJMS-9

Bacterium

Mesoflavibacter sabulilitoris is a Gram-negative, aerobic, rod-shaped, non-spore-forming and non-motile bacterium from the genus of Mesoflavibacter.
