= Olleya algicola =

Scientific classification
- Domain: Bacteria
- Kingdom: Pseudomonadati
- Phylum: Bacteroidota
- Class: Flavobacteriia
- Order: Flavobacteriales
- Family: Flavobacteriaceae
- Genus: Olleya
- Species: O. algicola

Binomial name
- Olleya algicola Nedashkovskaya et al. 2017

Type strain
- 3Alg 18

Bacterium

Olleya algicola is a Gram-negative, strictly aerobic, rod-shaped and motile bacterium from the genus of Olleya which has been isolated from the alga Ulva fenestrata from the Pacific Ocean.
