= Gaetbulibacter jejuensis =

Scientific classification
- Domain: Bacteria
- Kingdom: Pseudomonadati
- Phylum: Bacteroidota
- Class: Flavobacteriia
- Order: Flavobacteriales
- Family: Flavobacteriaceae
- Genus: Gaetbulibacter
- Species: G. jejuensis

Binomial name
- Gaetbulibacter jejuensis Oh et al. 2010

Type strain
- CNURIC014

Bacterium

Gaetbulibacter jejuensis is a Gram-negative, rod-shaped, strictly aerobic and non-motile bacterium from the genus of Gaetbulibacter which has been isolated from seawater from the coast of the Jeju Island.
