= Salinimicrobium xinjiangense =

Scientific classification
- Domain: Bacteria
- Kingdom: Pseudomonadati
- Phylum: Bacteroidota
- Class: Flavobacteriia
- Order: Flavobacteriales
- Family: Flavobacteriaceae
- Genus: Salinimicrobium
- Species: S. xinjiangense

Binomial name
- Salinimicrobium xinjiangense Lim et al. 2008

Type strain
- BH206

Bacterium

Salinimicrobium xinjiangense is a Gram-negative, moderately halophilic, rod-shaped and non-motile bacterium from the genus of Salinimicrobium which has been isolated from a saline lake from Xinjiang in China.
