= Zhouia amylolytica =

Scientific classification
- Domain: Bacteria
- Kingdom: Pseudomonadati
- Phylum: Bacteroidota
- Class: Flavobacteriia
- Order: Flavobacteriales
- Family: Flavobacteriaceae
- Genus: Zhouia
- Species: Z. amylolytica

Binomial name
- Zhouia amylolytica Liu et al. 2006

Bacterium

Zhouia amylolytica is a Gram-negative and non-spore-forming bacterium from the genus of Zhouia which has been isolated from sediments from the South China Sea. The species name comes from the bacterium's ability to hydrolyse starch. Z. amylolytica produces circular, yellow to pale-yellow colonies on marine agar. The species requires sodium chloride for growth; however, growth is inhibited at concentrations above 9%.
