= Hanstruepera neustonica =

Scientific classification
- Domain: Bacteria
- Kingdom: Pseudomonadati
- Phylum: Bacteroidota
- Class: Flavobacteriia
- Order: Flavobacteriales
- Family: Flavobacteriaceae
- Genus: Hanstruepera
- Species: H. neustonica

Binomial name
- Hanstruepera neustonica Hameed et al. 2015

Type strain
- CC-PY-50

Species of bacterium

Hanstruepera neustonica is a Gram-negative, strictly aerobic, rod-shaped, non-spore-forming and non-motile bacterium from the genus of Hanstruepera.
