= Aquibacter zeaxanthinifaciens =

Scientific classification
- Domain: Bacteria
- Kingdom: Pseudomonadati
- Phylum: Bacteroidota
- Class: Flavobacteriia
- Order: Flavobacteriales
- Family: Flavobacteriaceae
- Genus: Aquibacter
- Species: A. zeaxanthinifaciens

Binomial name
- Aquibacter zeaxanthinifaciens Hameed et al. 2014

Type strain
- BCRC 80463, CC-AMZ-304, JCM 18557

Synonyms
- Gaetbulibacter bettii

Species of bacterium

Aquibacter zeaxanthinifaciens is a Gram-negative, zeaxanthin-producing, strictly aerobic, rod-shaped and non-spore-forming bacterium from the genus Aquibacter which has been isolated from seawater near Taichung in Taiwan.
