= Hanstruepera crassostreae =

Scientific classification
- Domain: Bacteria
- Kingdom: Pseudomonadati
- Phylum: Bacteroidota
- Class: Flavobacteriia
- Order: Flavobacteriales
- Family: Flavobacteriaceae
- Genus: Hanstruepera
- Species: H. crassostreae

Binomial name
- Hanstruepera crassostreae He et al. 2018

Type strain
- L53

Species of bacterium

Hanstruepera crassostreae is a Gram-negative, aerobic, rod-shaped and non-motile bacterium from the genus of Hanstruepera which has been isolated from an oyster from Weihai.
