= Olleya namhaensis =

Scientific classification
- Domain: Bacteria
- Kingdom: Pseudomonadati
- Phylum: Bacteroidota
- Class: Flavobacteriia
- Order: Flavobacteriales
- Family: Flavobacteriaceae
- Genus: Olleya
- Species: O. namhaensis

Binomial name
- Olleya namhaensis Lee et al. 2013

Type strain
- WT-MY15

Bacterium

Olleya namhaensis is a Gram-negative, rod-shaped and motile bacterium from the genus of Olleya. The species was first isolated from wood falls, or wood that has fallen into the ocean.
