= Gaetbulibacter saemankumensis =

Scientific classification
- Domain: Bacteria
- Kingdom: Pseudomonadati
- Phylum: Bacteroidota
- Class: Flavobacteriia
- Order: Flavobacteriales
- Family: Flavobacteriaceae
- Genus: Gaetbulibacter
- Species: G. saemankumensis

Binomial name
- Gaetbulibacter saemankumensis Jung et al. 2005

Bacterium

Gaetbulibacter saemankumensis is a Gram-negative and rod-shaped bacterium from the genus of Gaetbulibacter which has been isolated from tidal flat sediments from the Yellow Sea.
