= Sinomicrobium pectinilyticum =

Scientific classification
- Domain: Bacteria
- Kingdom: Pseudomonadati
- Phylum: Bacteroidota
- Class: Flavobacteriia
- Order: Flavobacteriales
- Family: Flavobacteriaceae
- Genus: Sinomicrobium
- Species: S. pectinilyticum

Binomial name
- Sinomicrobium pectinilyticum Cheng et al. 2014

Type strain
- 5DNS001

Bacterium

Sinomicrobium pectinilyticum is a Gram-negative, non-spore-forming and pectinase-producing bacterium from the genus of Sinomicrobium.
