= Jejuia pallidilutea =

Scientific classification
- Domain: Bacteria
- Kingdom: Pseudomonadati
- Phylum: Bacteroidota
- Class: Flavobacteriia
- Order: Flavobacteriales
- Family: Flavobacteriaceae
- Genus: Jejuia
- Species: J. pallidilutea

Binomial name
- Jejuia pallidilutea Lee et al. 2009

Type strain
- EM39

Synonyms
- Hyunsoonleella pallidilutea

Species of bacterium

Jejuia pallidilutea is a Gram-negative and aerobic bacterium from the genus of Jejuia which has been isolated from seawater from the coast of Jeju Island.
