= Gaetbulibacter marinus =

Scientific classification
- Domain: Bacteria
- Kingdom: Pseudomonadati
- Phylum: Bacteroidota
- Class: Flavobacteriia
- Order: Flavobacteriales
- Family: Flavobacteriaceae
- Genus: Gaetbulibacter
- Species: G. marinus

Binomial name
- Gaetbulibacter marinus Yang and Cho 2008

Type strain
- IMCC1914

Bacterium

Gaetbulibacter marinus is a Gram-negative, rod-shaped, strictly aerobic, chemoheterotrophic and non-motile bacterium from the genus of Gaetbulibacter which has been isolated from surface seawater from the coast of the Yellow Sea in Korea.
