= Wocania indica =

Scientific classification
- Domain: Bacteria
- Kingdom: Pseudomonadati
- Phylum: Bacteroidota
- Class: Flavobacteriia
- Order: Flavobacteriales
- Family: Flavobacteriaceae
- Genus: Wocania
- Species: W. indica

Binomial name
- Wocania indica He et al. 2020

Type strain
- IOP_32

Bacterium

Wocania indica is a Gram-negative, strictly aerobic, rod-shaped and non-motile bacterium from the genus of Wocania which has been isolated from hydrothermal sulfide from the northwest Indian Ocean Ridg.
