= Urechidicola =

Scientific classification
- Domain: Bacteria
- Kingdom: Pseudomonadati
- Phylum: Bacteroidota
- Class: Flavobacteriia
- Order: Flavobacteriales
- Family: Flavobacteriaceae
- Genus: Urechidicola; Shin and Yi 2020

Type species
- Urechidicola croceus

Species
- U. croceus

Genus of bacteria

Urechidicola is a Gram-negative, aerobic, rod-shaped and non-motile genus of bacteria from the family of Flavobacteriaceae with one known species (Urechidicola croceus). Urechidicola croceus has been isolated from the marine spoon worm Urechis unicinctus.
