= Aestuariivivens =

Scientific classification
- Domain: Bacteria
- Kingdom: Pseudomonadati
- Phylum: Bacteroidota
- Class: Flavobacteriia
- Order: Flavobacteriales
- Family: Flavobacteriaceae
- Genus: Aestuariivivens; Park et al. 2015

Type species
- Aestuariivivens insulae

Species
- A. insulae

Genus of bacteria

Aestuariivivens is a Gram-negative, aerobic and non-motile genus of bacteria from the family of Flavobacteriaceae with one known species (Aestuariivivens insulae). Aestuariivivens insulae has been isolated from tidal flat from the Aphae island.
