= Croceivirga =

Scientific classification
- Domain: Bacteria
- Kingdom: Pseudomonadati
- Phylum: Bacteroidota
- Class: Flavobacteriia
- Order: Flavobacteriales
- Family: Flavobacteriaceae
- Genus: Croceivirga; Hu et al. 2017

Type species
- Croceivirga radicis

Species
- C. radicis

Genus of bacteria

Croceivirga is a genus of bacteria from the family of Flavobacteriaceae with one known species (Croceivirga radicis). Croceivirga radicis has been isolated from a rotten mangrove root.
