= Postechiella =

Scientific classification
- Domain: Bacteria
- Kingdom: Pseudomonadati
- Phylum: Bacteroidota
- Class: Flavobacteriia
- Order: Flavobacteriales
- Family: Flavobacteriaceae
- Genus: Postechiella; Lee et al. 2012

Type species
- Postechiella marina

Species
- P. marina

Genus of bacteria

Postechiella is a Gram-negative, strictly aerobic and non-motile genus of bacteria from the family of Flavobacteriaceae with one known species (Postechiella marina). Postechiella marina has been isolated from seawater from the beach of Damupo in Korea.
