= Corallibacter =

Scientific classification
- Domain: Bacteria
- Kingdom: Pseudomonadati
- Phylum: Bacteroidota
- Class: Flavobacteriia
- Order: Flavobacteriales
- Family: Flavobacteriaceae
- Genus: Corallibacter; Kim et al. 2012

Type species
- Corallibacter vietnamensis

Species
- C. vietnamensis

Genus of bacteria

Corallibacter is a Gram-negative, strictly aerobic and heterotrophic genus of bacteria from the family of Flavobacteriaceae with one known species (Corallibacter vietnamensis).
