= Algitalea =

Scientific classification
- Domain: Bacteria
- Kingdom: Pseudomonadati
- Phylum: Bacteroidota
- Class: Flavobacteriia
- Order: Flavobacteriales
- Family: Flavobacteriaceae
- Genus: Algitalea; Yoon et al. 2015

Type species
- Algitalea ulvae

Species
- A. ulvae

Genus of bacteria

Algitalea is a Gram-negative, strictly aerobic, rod-shaped, non-spore-forming genus of bacteria from the family of Flavobacteriaceae with one known species (Algitalea ulvae). Algitalea ulvae has been isolated from the alga Ulva pertusa.
