= Geojedonia =

Scientific classification
- Domain: Bacteria
- Kingdom: Pseudomonadati
- Phylum: Bacteroidota
- Class: Flavobacteriia
- Order: Flavobacteriales
- Family: Flavobacteriaceae
- Genus: Geojedonia; Park et al. 2013

Type species
- Geojedonia litorea

Species
- G. litorea

Genus of bacteria

Geojedonia is a Gram-negative, rod-shaped and non-motile genus of bacteria from the family of Flavobacteriaceae with one known species (Geojedonia litorea). Geojedonia litorea has been isolated from seawater from a seaweed farm from the South Sea from Korea.
