= Aestuariimonas =

Scientific classification
- Domain: Bacteria
- Kingdom: Pseudomonadati
- Phylum: Bacteroidota
- Class: Flavobacteriia
- Order: Flavobacteriales
- Family: Flavobacteriaceae
- Genus: Aestuariimonas; Park et al. 2018

Type species
- Aestuariimonas insulae

Species
- A. insulae

Genus of bacteria

Aestuariimonas is a Gram-negative, aerobic genus of bacteria from the family of Flavobacteriaceae with one known species (Aestuariimonas insulae). Aestuariimonas insulae has been isolated from tidal flat from Oido.
