= Marinirhabdus =

Scientific classification
- Domain: Bacteria
- Kingdom: Pseudomonadati
- Phylum: Bacteroidota
- Class: Flavobacteriia
- Order: Flavobacteriales
- Family: Flavobacteriaceae
- Genus: Marinirhabdus; Wu et al. 2016

Type species
- Marinirhabdus gelatinilytica

Species
- M. citrea M. gelatinilytica

Genus of bacteria

Marinirhabdus is a genus of bacteria from the family of Flavobacteriaceae.
