= Flavimarina =

Scientific classification
- Domain: Bacteria
- Kingdom: Pseudomonadati
- Phylum: Bacteroidota
- Class: Flavobacteriia
- Order: Flavobacteriales
- Family: Flavobacteriaceae
- Genus: Flavimarina; Nedashkovskaya et al. 2015

Type species
- Flavimarina pacifica

Species
- F. flava F. pacifica

Genus of bacteria

Flavimarina is a genus of bacteria from the family of Flavobacteriaceae.
