= Leptobacterium =

Scientific classification
- Domain: Bacteria
- Kingdom: Pseudomonadati
- Phylum: Bacteroidota
- Class: Flavobacteriia
- Order: Flavobacteriales
- Family: Flavobacteriaceae
- Genus: Leptobacterium; Mitra et al. 2009

Type species
- Leptobacterium flavescens

Species
- L. flavescens

Genus of bacteria

Leptobacterium is a Gram-negative, obligately aerobic and non-motile genus of bacteria from the family of Flavobacteriaceae with one known species (Leptobacterium flavescens).
