= Siansivirga =

Scientific classification
- Domain: Bacteria
- Kingdom: Pseudomonadati
- Phylum: Bacteroidota
- Class: Flavobacteriia
- Order: Flavobacteriales
- Family: Flavobacteriaceae
- Genus: Siansivirga; Hameed et al. 2013

Type species
- Siansivirga zeaxanthinifaciens

Species
- S. jejuensis S. zeaxanthinifaciens

Genus of bacteria

Siansivirga is a genus of bacteria from the family of Flavobacteriaceae.
