= Arenitalea =

Scientific classification
- Domain: Bacteria
- Kingdom: Pseudomonadati
- Phylum: Bacteroidota
- Class: Flavobacteriia
- Order: Flavobacteriales
- Family: Flavobacteriaceae
- Genus: Arenitalea; Zhang et al. 2013

Type species
- Arenitalea lutea

Species
- A. lutea

Genus of bacteria

Arenitalea is a Gram-negative, facultatively aerobic and rod-shaped genus of bacteria from the family of Flavobacteriaceae with one known species (Arenitalea lutea). Arenitalea lutea has been isolated from sand from the Yellow Sea.
