= Paucihalobacter =

Scientific classification
- Domain: Bacteria
- Kingdom: Pseudomonadati
- Phylum: Bacteroidota
- Class: Flavobacteriia
- Order: Flavobacteriales
- Family: Flavobacteriaceae
- Genus: Paucihalobacter; Wu et al. 2020

Type species
- Paucihalobacter ruber

Species
- P. ruber

Genus of bacteria

Paucihalobacter is a Gram-negative, strictly aerobic, rod-shaped and non-motile genus of bacteria from the family of Flavobacteriaceae with one known species (Paucihalobacter ruber). Paucihalobacter ruber has been isolated from sediments from the bottom of the Chaiwopu Lake.
