= Robertkochia =

Scientific classification
- Domain: Bacteria
- Kingdom: Pseudomonadati
- Phylum: Bacteroidota
- Class: Flavobacteriia
- Order: Flavobacteriales
- Family: Flavobacteriaceae
- Genus: Robertkochia; Hameed et al. 2014

Type species
- Robertkochia marina

Species
- R. marina R. sediminum R. solimangrovi

Genus of bacteria

Robertkochia is a genus of gram-negative bacteria from the family of Flavobacteriaceae. Robertkochia is named after the German microbiologist Robert Koch.
