= Litoribaculum =

Scientific classification
- Domain: Bacteria
- Kingdom: Pseudomonadati
- Phylum: Bacteroidota
- Class: Flavobacteriia
- Order: Flavobacteriales
- Family: Flavobacteriaceae
- Genus: Litoribaculum; Jin and Jeon 2015

Type species
- Litoribaculumm gwangyangense

Species
- L. gwangyangense

Genus of bacteria

Litoribaculum is a Gram-negative, moderately halotolerant and strictly aerobic genus of bacteria from the family of Flavobacteriaceae with one known species (Litoribaculum gwangyangense). Litoribaculum gwangyangense has been isolated from tidal flat from South Korea.
