= Flavihalobacter =

Scientific classification
- Domain: Bacteria
- Kingdom: Pseudomonadati
- Phylum: Bacteroidota
- Class: Flavobacteriia
- Order: Flavobacteriales
- Family: Flavobacteriaceae
- Genus: Flavihalobacter; Yin et al. 2021

Type species
- Flavihalobacter algicola

Species
- F. algicola

Genus of bacteria

Flavihalobacter is a Gram-negative, aerobic, rod-shaped and non-motile genus of bacteria from the family of Flavobacteriaceae with one known species (Flavihalobacter algicola). Flavihalobacter algicola has been isolated from the alga Saccharina japonica from Weihai.
