= Flavicella =

Scientific classification
- Domain: Bacteria
- Kingdom: Pseudomonadati
- Phylum: Bacteroidota
- Class: Flavobacteriia
- Order: Flavobacteriales
- Family: Flavobacteriaceae
- Genus: Flavicella; Teramoto and Nishijima 2015

Type species
- Flavicella marina

Species
- F. marina F. sediminum

Genus of bacteria

Flavicella is a genus of bacteria from the family of Flavobacteriaceae.
