= Joostella =

Scientific classification
- Domain: Bacteria
- Kingdom: Pseudomonadati
- Phylum: Bacteroidota
- Class: Flavobacteriia
- Order: Flavobacteriales
- Family: Flavobacteriaceae
- Genus: Joostella; Quan et al. 2008

Species
- J. atrarenae J. marina

Bacterium

Joostella is a genus of marine gram-negative bacteria from the family of Flavobacteriaceae.
