= Croceibacter =

Scientific classification
- Domain: Bacteria
- Kingdom: Pseudomonadati
- Phylum: Bacteroidota
- Class: Flavobacteriia
- Order: Flavobacteriales
- Family: Flavobacteriaceae
- Genus: Croceibacter; Cho and Giovannoni 2003

Type species
- C. atlanticus

Genus of bacteria

Croceibacter is a genus in the phylum Bacteroidota (Bacteria).

== Etymology ==
The name Croceibacter derives from:
Latin adjective croceus, saffron-colored; Neo-Latin masculine gender noun, a rodbacter, nominally meaning "a rod", but in effect meaning a bacterium, rod; Neo-Latin masculine gender noun Croceibacter, saffron-colored rod.

== Species ==
The genus contains a single species, namely C. atlanticus ( Cho and Giovannoni 2003, (Type species of the genus).; Latin masculine gender adjective atlanticus, of or pertaining to the Atlantic Ocean (a species isolated from the Atlantic Ocean).)

== See also ==
- Bacterial taxonomy
- Microbiology
