= Muriicola =

Scientific classification
- Domain: Bacteria
- Kingdom: Pseudomonadati
- Phylum: Bacteroidota
- Class: Flavobacteriia
- Order: Flavobacteriales
- Family: Flavobacteriaceae
- Genus: Muriicola; Kahng et al. 2010

Type species
- Muriicola jejuensis

Species
- M. jejuensis M. marianensis M. soli

Genus of bacteria

Muriicola is a genus of gram-negative bacteria from the family of Flavobacteriaceae. The taxa contains three validly published species.
