= Aquaticitalea =

Scientific classification
- Domain: Bacteria
- Kingdom: Pseudomonadati
- Phylum: Bacteroidota
- Class: Flavobacteriia
- Order: Flavobacteriales
- Family: Flavobacteriaceae
- Genus: Aquaticitalea; Xamxidin et al. 2016

Type species
- Aquaticitalea lipolytica

Species
- A. lipolytica

Genus of bacteria

Aquaticitalea is a Gram-negative and rod-shaped genus of bacteria from the family of Flavobacteriaceae with one known species (Aquaticitalea lipolytica). Aquaticitalea lipolytica has been isolated from seawater from the Antarctic.
