= Pricia =

Scientific classification
- Domain: Bacteria
- Kingdom: Pseudomonadati
- Phylum: Bacteroidota
- Class: Flavobacteriia
- Order: Flavobacteriales
- Family: Flavobacteriaceae
- Genus: Pricia; Yu et al. 2012

Type species
- Pricia antarctica

Species
- P. antarctica

Genus of bacteria

Pricia is a Gram-negative, aerobic, rod-shaped and non-motile genus of bacteria from the family of Flavobacteriaceae with one known species (Pricia antarctica).
