= Antarcticibacterium =

Scientific classification
- Domain: Bacteria
- Kingdom: Pseudomonadati
- Phylum: Bacteroidota
- Class: Flavobacteriia
- Order: Flavobacteriales
- Family: Flavobacteriaceae
- Genus: Antarcticibacterium; Li et al. 2018

Type species
- Antarcticibacterium flavum

Species
- A. arcticum A. flavum

Genus of bacteria

Antarcticibacterium is a genus of gram-negative bacteria from the family of Flavobacteriaceae.
