= Hanstruepera =

Scientific classification
- Domain: Bacteria
- Kingdom: Pseudomonadati
- Phylum: Bacteroidota
- Class: Flavobacteriia
- Order: Flavobacteriales
- Family: Flavobacteriaceae
- Genus: Hanstruepera; Hameed et al. 2015

Type species
- Hanstruepera neustonica

Species
- H. crassostreae H. neustonica

Genus of bacteria

Hanstruepera is a genus of gram-negative bacteria from the family of Flavobacteriaceae.
