= Mesohalobacter =

Scientific classification
- Domain: Bacteria
- Kingdom: Pseudomonadati
- Phylum: Bacteroidota
- Class: Flavobacteriia
- Order: Flavobacteriales
- Family: Flavobacteriaceae
- Genus: Mesohalobacter; Feng et al. 2020

Type species
- Mesohalobacter halotolerans

Species
- M. halotolerans

Genus of bacteria

Mesohalobacter is a Gram-negative and non-motile genus of bacteria from the family of Flavobacteriaceae with one known species (Mesohalobacter halotolerans).
