= Kriegella =

Scientific classification
- Domain: Bacteria
- Kingdom: Pseudomonadati
- Phylum: Bacteroidota
- Class: Flavobacteriia
- Order: Flavobacteriales
- Family: Flavobacteriaceae
- Genus: Kriegella; Nedashkovskaya et al. 2008

Type species
- Kriegella aquimaris

Species
- K. aquimaris

Genus of bacteria

Kriegella is a Gram-negative, aerobic and heterotrophic genus of bacteria from the family of Flavobacteriaceae with one known species (Kriegella aquimaris). Kriegella is named after the American microbiologist Noel R. Krieg.
