= Aureicoccus =

Scientific classification
- Domain: Bacteria
- Kingdom: Pseudomonadati
- Phylum: Bacteroidota
- Class: Flavobacteriia
- Order: Flavobacteriales
- Family: Flavobacteriaceae
- Genus: Aureicoccus; Park et al. 2013

Type species
- Aureicoccus marinus

Species
- A. marinus

Genus of bacteria

Aureicoccus is a Gram-negative, obligately aerobic and heterotrophic genus of bacteria from the family of Flavobacteriaceae with one known species (Aureicoccus marinus). Aureicoccus marinus has been isolated from seawater from the North Pacific Ocean.
