= Daejeonia =

Scientific classification
- Domain: Bacteria
- Kingdom: Pseudomonadati
- Phylum: Bacteroidota
- Class: Flavobacteriia
- Order: Flavobacteriales
- Family: Flavobacteriaceae
- Genus: Daejeonia; Siddiqi et al. 2017

Type species
- Daejeonia ginsenosidivorans

Species
- D. ginsenosidivorans

Genus of bacteria

Daejeonia is a Gram-negative and strictly aerobic genus of bacteria from the family of Flavobacteriaceae with one known species (Daejeonia ginsenosidivorans).
