= Spongiiferula =

Scientific classification
- Domain: Bacteria
- Kingdom: Pseudomonadati
- Phylum: Bacteroidota
- Class: Flavobacteriia
- Order: Flavobacteriales
- Family: Flavobacteriaceae
- Genus: Spongiiferula; Yoon et al. 2016

Type species
- Spongiiferula fulva

Species
- S. fulva

Genus of bacteria

Spongiiferula is a Gram-negative, strictly aerobic, rod-shaped, chemoheterotrophic and non-motile genus of bacteria from the family of Flavobacteriaceae with one known species (Spongiiferula fulva). Spongiiferula fulva has been isolated from the marine sponge Rhabdastrella sp.
