= Citreitalea =

Scientific classification
- Domain: Bacteria
- Kingdom: Pseudomonadati
- Phylum: Bacteroidota
- Class: Flavobacteriia
- Order: Flavobacteriales
- Family: Flavobacteriaceae
- Genus: Citreitalea; Yoon et al. 2014

Type species
- Citreitalea marina

Species
- C. marina

Genus of bacteria

Citreitalea is a Gram-negative, strictly aerobic and rod-shaped genus of bacteria from the family of Flavobacteriaceae with one known species (Citreitalea marina). Citreitalea marina has been isolated from the marine alga Chondrus ocellatus.
