= Pelagihabitans =

Scientific classification
- Domain: Bacteria
- Kingdom: Pseudomonadati
- Phylum: Bacteroidota
- Class: Flavobacteriia
- Order: Flavobacteriales
- Family: Flavobacteriaceae
- Genus: Pelagihabitans; Wang et al. 2020

Type species
- Pelagihabitans pacificus

Species
- P. pacificus

Genus of bacteria

Pelagihabitans is a Gram-negative, strictly aerobic, rod-shaped, non-spore-forming and non-motile genus of bacteria from the family of Flavobacteriaceae with one known species (Pelagihabitans pacificus). Pelagihabitans pacificus has been isolated from a deep-sea seamount.
