= Eudoraea =

Scientific classification
- Domain: Bacteria
- Kingdom: Pseudomonadati
- Phylum: Bacteroidota
- Class: Flavobacteriia
- Order: Flavobacteriales
- Family: Flavobacteriaceae
- Genus: Eudoraea; Alain et al. 2008

Type species
- Eudoraea adriatica

Species
- E. adriatica E. chungangensis

Genus of bacteria

Eudoraea is a genus of bacteria from the family of Flavobacteriaceae.
