= Sungkyunkwania =

Scientific classification
- Domain: Bacteria
- Kingdom: Pseudomonadati
- Phylum: Bacteroidota
- Class: Flavobacteriia
- Order: Flavobacteriales
- Family: Flavobacteriaceae
- Genus: Sungkyunkwania; Yoon et al. 2013

Type species
- Sungkyunkwania multivorans

Species
- S. multivorans

Genus of bacteria

Sungkyunkwania is a Gram-negative, rod-shaped and non-motile genus of bacteria from the family of Flavobacteriaceae with one known species (Sungkyunkwania multivorans). Sungkyunkwania multivorans has been isolated from a seaweed farm from the South Sea from Korea. Sungkyunkwania is named after the Sungkyunkwan University.
