= Aestuariibaculum =

Scientific classification
- Domain: Bacteria
- Kingdom: Pseudomonadati
- Phylum: Bacteroidota
- Class: Flavobacteriia
- Order: Flavobacteriales
- Family: Flavobacteriaceae
- Genus: Aestuariibaculum; Jeong et al. 2013

Species
- A. marinum; A. scopimerae; A. suncheonense

Genus of bacteria

Aestuariibaculum is a genus from the family of Flavobacteriaceae.
