= Xanthomarina =

Scientific classification
- Domain: Bacteria
- Kingdom: Pseudomonadati
- Phylum: Bacteroidota
- Class: Flavobacteriia
- Order: Flavobacteriales
- Family: Flavobacteriaceae
- Genus: Xanthomarina; Vaidya et al. 2015

Type species
- Xanthomarina gelatinilytica

Species
- X. gelatinilytica X. spongicola

Genus of bacteria

Xanthomarina is a genus of gram-negative bacteria from the family of Flavobacteriaceae.
