= Aurantivirga =

Scientific classification
- Domain: Bacteria
- Kingdom: Pseudomonadati
- Phylum: Bacteroidota
- Class: Flavobacteriia
- Order: Flavobacteriales
- Family: Flavobacteriaceae
- Genus: Aurantivirga; Song et al. 2015

Type species
- Aurantivirga profunda

Species
- A. profunda

Genus of bacteria

Aurantivirga is a Gram-negative, aerobic, proteorhodopsin-containing and rod-shaped genus of bacteria from the family of Flavobacteriaceae with one known species (Aurantivirga profunda). Aurantivirga profunda has been isolated from deep seawater from the Pacific Ocean.
