= Pseudozobellia =

Scientific classification
- Domain: Bacteria
- Kingdom: Pseudomonadati
- Phylum: Bacteroidota
- Class: Flavobacteriia
- Order: Flavobacteriales
- Family: Flavobacteriaceae
- Genus: Pseudozobellia; Nedashkovskaya et al. 2009

Type species
- Pseudozobellia thermophila

Species
- P. thermophila

Genus of bacteria

Pseudozobellia is a Gram-negative and aerobic genus of bacteria from the family of Flavobacteriaceae with one known species (Pseudozobellia thermophila). Pseudozobellia thermophila has been isolated from the alga Ulva fenestrata. P. thermophila produces flexirubin-type pigments.
