= Changchengzhania =

Scientific classification
- Domain: Bacteria
- Kingdom: Pseudomonadati
- Phylum: Bacteroidota
- Class: Flavobacteriia
- Order: Flavobacteriales
- Family: Flavobacteriaceae
- Genus: Changchengzhania; Wang et al. 2017

Type species
- Changchengzhania lutea

Species
- C. lutea

Genus of bacteria

Changchengzhania is a Gram-negative, aerobic, rod-shaped and non-motile genus of bacteria from the family of Flavobacteriaceae with one known species (Changchengzhania lutea).
