= Wocania =

Scientific classification
- Domain: Bacteria
- Kingdom: Pseudomonadati
- Phylum: Bacteroidota
- Class: Flavobacteriia
- Order: Flavobacteriales
- Family: Flavobacteriaceae
- Genus: Wocania; He et al. 2020

Type species
- Wocania indica

Species
- W. ichthyoenteri W. indica

Genus of bacteria

Wocania is a genus of bacteria from the family of Flavobacteriaceae.
