= Confluentibacter =

Scientific classification
- Domain: Bacteria
- Kingdom: Pseudomonadati
- Phylum: Bacteroidota
- Class: Flavobacteriia
- Order: Flavobacteriales
- Family: Flavobacteriaceae
- Genus: Confluentibacter; Park et al. 2016

Type species
- Confluentibacter lentus

Species
- C. citreus C. lentus

Genus of bacteria

Confluentibacter is a genus of gram-negative bacteria from the family of Flavobacteriaceae.
