= Flaviramulus =

Scientific classification
- Domain: Bacteria
- Kingdom: Pseudomonadati
- Phylum: Bacteroidota
- Class: Flavobacteriia
- Order: Flavobacteriales
- Family: Flavobacteriaceae
- Genus: Flaviramulus; Einen and Øvreås 2006

Species
- F. aestuariivivens F. aquimarinus F. basaltis

Bacterium

Flaviramulus is an obligately aerobic and Gram-negative genus of bacteria from the family of Flavobacteriaceae.
