= Poritiphilus =

Scientific classification
- Domain: Bacteria
- Kingdom: Pseudomonadati
- Phylum: Bacteroidota
- Class: Flavobacteriia
- Order: Flavobacteriales
- Family: Flavobacteriaceae
- Genus: Poritiphilus; Wang et al. 2020

Type species
- Poritiphilus flavus

Species
- P. flavus

Genus of bacteria

Poritiphilus is a Gram-negative, aerobic, non-endospore-forming and non-motile genus of bacteria from the family of Flavobacteriaceae with one known species (Poritiphilus flavus). Poritiphilus flavus has been isolated from the coral Porites lutea.
