= Snuella =

Scientific classification
- Domain: Bacteria
- Kingdom: Pseudomonadati
- Phylum: Bacteroidota
- Class: Flavobacteriia
- Order: Flavobacteriales
- Family: Flavobacteriaceae
- Genus: Snuella; Yi and Chun 2011

Type species
- Snuella lapsa

Species
- S. lapsa S. sedimenti

Genus of bacteria

Snuella is a genus of bacteria from the family of Flavobacteriaceae.
