= Sinomicrobium =

Scientific classification
- Domain: Bacteria
- Kingdom: Pseudomonadati
- Phylum: Bacteroidota
- Class: Flavobacteriia
- Order: Flavobacteriales
- Family: Flavobacteriaceae
- Genus: Sinomicrobium; Xu et al. 2013

Type species
- Sinomicrobium oceani

Species
- S. oceani S. pectinilyticum S. soli

Genus of bacteria

Sinomicrobium is a genus of bacteria from the family of Flavobacteriaceae.
