= Pseudotenacibaculum =

Scientific classification
- Domain: Bacteria
- Kingdom: Pseudomonadati
- Phylum: Bacteroidota
- Class: Flavobacteriia
- Order: Flavobacteriales
- Family: Flavobacteriaceae
- Genus: Pseudotenacibaculum; Huang et al. 2016

Type species
- Pseudotenacibaculum haliotis

Species
- P. haliotis

Genus of bacteria

Pseudotenacibaculum is a genus of bacteria from the family of Flavobacteriaceae with one known species (Pseudotenacibaculum haliotis).
