= Pontimicrobium =

Scientific classification
- Domain: Bacteria
- Kingdom: Pseudomonadati
- Phylum: Bacteroidota
- Class: Flavobacteriia
- Order: Flavobacteriales
- Family: Flavobacteriaceae
- Genus: Pontimicrobium; Janthra et al. 2020

Type species
- Pontimicrobium aquaticum

Species
- P. aquaticum

Genus of bacteria

Pontimicrobium is a Gram-negative, strictly aerobic, non-spore-forming, rod-shaped and non-motile genus of bacteria from the family of Flavobacteriaceae with one known species (Pontimicrobium aquaticum). Pontimicrobium aquaticum has been isolated from seawater.
