= Arcticiflavibacter =

Scientific classification
- Domain: Bacteria
- Kingdom: Pseudomonadati
- Phylum: Bacteroidota
- Class: Flavobacteriia
- Order: Flavobacteriales
- Family: Flavobacteriaceae
- Genus: Arcticiflavibacter; Liu et al. 2016

Type species
- Arcticiflavibacter luteus

Species
- A. luteus

Genus of bacteria

Arcticiflavibacter is a Gram-negative, aerobic and rod-shaped genus of bacteria from the family of Flavobacteriaceae with one known species (Arcticiflavibacter luteus).
