= Maribacter =

Scientific classification
- Domain: Bacteria
- Kingdom: Pseudomonadati
- Phylum: Bacteroidota
- Class: Flavobacteriia
- Order: Flavobacteriales
- Family: Flavobacteriaceae
- Genus: Maribacter; Nedashkovskaya et al. 2004

Type species
- Maribacter sedimenticola Nedashkovskaya et al. 2004

Species
- See text.

Synonyms
- Maripseudobacter Chen et al. 2017

Genus of bacteria

Maribacter is a genus in the phylum Bacteroidota.

== Species ==
The genus Maribacter comprises the following species:

- Maribacter aestuarii Lo et al. 2013
- Maribacter algarum Zhang et al. 2020
- Maribacter algicola Khan et al. 2020
- Maribacter antarcticus Zhang et al. 2009
- Maribacter aquivivus Nedashkovskaya et al. 2004
- Maribacter arcticus Cho et al. 2008
- Maribacter arenosus Thongphrom et al. 2016
- Maribacter aurantiacus (Chen et al. 2017) Khan et al. 2020
- Maribacter caenipelagi Jung et al. 2015
- Maribacter chungangensis Weerawongwiwat et al. 2013
- Maribacter cobaltidurans Fang et al. 2017
- Maribacter confluentis Park et al. 2015
- Maribacter dokdonensis Yoon et al. 2005
- Maribacter flavus Tang et al. 2015
- Maribacter forsetii Barbeyron et al. 2008
- Maribacter litoralis Lee et al. 2018
- Maribacter litorisediminis Park et al. 2016
- Maribacter luteus Liu et al. 2020
- Maribacter lutimaris Kim et al. 2016
- "Maribacter marinus" Wang et al. 2018
- Maribacter maritimus Kang et al. 2018
- Maribacter orientalis Nedashkovskaya et al. 2004
- Maribacter pelagius Jin et al. 2017
- Maribacter polysiphoniae Nedashkovskaya et al. 2007
- Maribacter sedimenticola Nedashkovskaya et al. 2004
- Maribacter spongiicola Jackson et al. 2015
- Maribacter stanieri Nedashkovskaya et al. 2010
- Maribacter thermophilus Hu et al. 2015
- Maribacter ulvicola Nedashkovskaya et al. 2004
- Maribacter vaceletii Jackson et al. 2015
