= Ulvibacterium =

Scientific classification
- Domain: Bacteria
- Kingdom: Pseudomonadati
- Phylum: Bacteroidota
- Class: Flavobacteriia
- Order: Flavobacteriales
- Family: Flavobacteriaceae
- Genus: Ulvibacterium; Zhang et al. 2021

Type species
- Ulvibacterium marinum

Species
- U. marinum

Genus of bacteria

Ulvibacterium is a Gram-negative, aerobic, rod-shaped and non-motile genus of bacteria from the family of Flavobacteriaceae with one known species (Ulvibacterium marinum). Ulvibacterium marinum has been isolated from the alga Ulva prolifera.
