= Aureibaculum =

Scientific classification
- Domain: Bacteria
- Kingdom: Pseudomonadati
- Phylum: Bacteroidota
- Class: Flavobacteriia
- Order: Flavobacteriales
- Family: Flavobacteriaceae
- Genus: Aureibaculum; Zhao et al. 2021

Type species
- Aureibaculum marinum

Species
- A. flavum; A. luteum; A. marinum

Genus of bacteria

Aureibaculum is a genus of gram-negative bacteria from the family Flavobacteriaceae.
