= Gelatiniphilus =

Scientific classification
- Domain: Bacteria
- Kingdom: Pseudomonadati
- Phylum: Bacteroidota
- Class: Flavobacteriia
- Order: Flavobacteriales
- Family: Flavobacteriaceae
- Genus: Gelatiniphilus; Tang et al. 2016

Type species
- Gelatiniphilus marinus

Species
- G. marinus

Genus of bacteria

Gelatiniphilus is a Gram-negative, non-spore-forming, rod-shaped and non-motile genus of bacteria from the family of Flavobacteriaceae with one known species (Gelatiniphilus marinus). Gelatiniphilus marinus has been isolated from the microalga Picochlorum sp.
