= Hwangdonia =

Scientific classification
- Domain: Bacteria
- Kingdom: Pseudomonadati
- Phylum: Bacteroidota
- Class: Flavobacteriia
- Order: Flavobacteriales
- Family: Flavobacteriaceae
- Genus: Hwangdonia; Jung et al. 2013

Type species
- Hwangdonia seohaensis

Species
- H. seohaensis

Genus of bacteria

Hwangdonia is a Gram-negative, rod-shaped, aerobic and non-motile genus of bacteria from the family of Flavobacteriaceae with one known species (Hwangdonia seohaensis). Hwangdonia seohaensis has been isolated from sediments of tidal flat from Hwangdo in the Yellow Sea.
