= Planktosalinus =

Scientific classification
- Domain: Bacteria
- Kingdom: Pseudomonadati
- Phylum: Bacteroidota
- Class: Flavobacteriia
- Order: Flavobacteriales
- Family: Flavobacteriaceae
- Genus: Planktosalinus; Zhong et al. 2016

Type species
- Planktosalinus lacus

Species
- P. lacus

Genus of bacteria

Planktosalinus is a Gram-negative, non-motile, strictly heterotrophic and aerobic genus of bacteria from the family of Flavobacteriaceae with one known species (Planktosalinus lacus). Planktosalinus lacus has been isolated from the Lake Xiaochaidan in China. Panktosalinus lacus is positive for production of catalase. Unlike most members of its family, P. lacus does not produce oxidase.
