= Taeania =

Scientific classification
- Domain: Bacteria
- Kingdom: Pseudomonadati
- Phylum: Bacteroidota
- Class: Flavobacteriia
- Order: Flavobacteriales
- Family: Flavobacteriaceae
- Genus: Taeania; Jung et al. 2016

Type species
- Taeania maliponensis

Species
- T. maliponensis

Genus of bacteria

Taeania is a Gram-negative, rod-shaped and non-motile genus of bacteria from the family of Flavobacteriaceae with one known species (Taeania maliponensis). Taeania maliponensis has been isolated from seawater from Korea.
