= Psychroserpens =

Psychroserpens burtonensis

Scientific classification
- Domain: Bacteria
- Kingdom: Pseudomonadati
- Phylum: Bacteroidota
- Class: Flavobacteriia
- Order: Flavobacteriales
- Family: Flavobacteriaceae
- Genus: Psychroserpens; Bowman et al. 1997

Type species
- Psychroserpens burtonensis

Species
- P. burtonensis P. damuponensis P. jangbogonensis P. mesophilus

Genus of bacteria

Psychroserpens is a Gram-negative and strictly aerobic bacteria genus from the family of Flavobacteriaceae.
