= Pustulibacterium =

Scientific classification
- Domain: Bacteria
- Kingdom: Pseudomonadati
- Phylum: Bacteroidota
- Class: Flavobacteriia
- Order: Flavobacteriales
- Family: Flavobacteriaceae
- Genus: Pustulibacterium; Wang et al. 2013

Type species
- Pustulibacterium marinum

Species
- P. marinum

Genus of bacteria

Pustulibacterium is a Gram-negative, aerobic, non-spore-forming and non-motile genus of bacteria from the family of Flavobacteriaceae with one known species (Pustulibacterium marinum). Pustulibacterium marinum has been isolated from the Bashi Channel.
