= Subsaximicrobium =

Scientific classification
- Domain: Bacteria
- Kingdom: Pseudomonadati
- Phylum: Bacteroidota
- Class: Flavobacteriia
- Order: Flavobacteriales
- Family: Flavobacteriaceae
- Genus: Subsaximicrobium; Bowman and Nichols 2005

Species
- S. saxinquilinus S. wynnwilliamsii

Bacterium

Subsaximicrobium is a genus of bacteria from the family of Flavobacteriaceae.
