= Spongiimicrobium =

Scientific classification
- Domain: Bacteria
- Kingdom: Pseudomonadati
- Phylum: Bacteroidota
- Class: Flavobacteriia
- Order: Flavobacteriales
- Family: Flavobacteriaceae
- Genus: Spongiimicrobium; Yoon et al. 2016

Type species
- Spongiimicrobium salis

Species
- S. salis

Genus of bacteria

Spongiimicrobium is a Gram-negative, strictly aerobic, rod-shaped and chemoheterotrophic genus of bacteria from the family of Flavobacteriaceae with one known species (Spongiimicrobium salis). Spongiimicrobium salis has been isolated from a marine sponge from Japan.
