= Mesoflavibacter =

Scientific classification
- Domain: Bacteria
- Kingdom: Pseudomonadati
- Phylum: Bacteroidota
- Class: Flavobacteriia
- Order: Flavobacteriales
- Family: Flavobacteriaceae
- Genus: Mesoflavibacter; Asker et al. 2008

Type species
- Mesoflavibacter zeaxanthinifaciens

Species
- M. profundi M. sabulilitoris M. zeaxanthinifaciens

Genus of bacteria

Mesoflavibacter is a genus of bacteria from the family of Flavobacteriaceae.
