= Zhouia =

Scientific classification
- Domain: Bacteria
- Kingdom: Pseudomonadati
- Phylum: Bacteroidota
- Class: Flavobacteriia
- Order: Flavobacteriales
- Family: Flavobacteriaceae
- Genus: Zhouia; Liu et al. 2006

Species
- Z. amylolytica Z. spongiae

Bacterium

Zhouia is a genus of gram-negative bacteria from the family of Flavobacteriaceae. Zhouia is named after Pei-Jin Zhou.
