= Neptunitalea =

Scientific classification
- Domain: Bacteria
- Kingdom: Pseudomonadati
- Phylum: Bacteroidota
- Class: Flavobacteriia
- Order: Flavobacteriales
- Family: Flavobacteriaceae
- Genus: Neptunitalea; Yoon and Kasai 2015

Type species
- Neptunitalea chrysea

Species
- N. chrysea

Genus of bacteria

Neptunitalea is a genus of marine, gram-negative bacteria from the family of Flavobacteriaceae with one known species (Neptunitalea chrysea). Neptunitalea chrysea was isolated from seawater and its cultivation required an in situ cultivation method.
