= Aurantibacter =

Scientific classification
- Domain: Bacteria
- Kingdom: Pseudomonadati
- Phylum: Bacteroidota
- Class: Flavobacteriia
- Order: Flavobacteriales
- Family: Flavobacteriaceae
- Genus: Aurantibacter; García-López et al. 2020

Type species
- Aurantibacter aestuarii

Species
- A. aestuarii A. crassamenti

Genus of bacteria

Aurantibacter is a genus of gram-negative bacteria from the family of Flavobacteriaceae.
