= Pibocella =

Scientific classification
- Domain: Bacteria
- Kingdom: Pseudomonadati
- Phylum: Bacteroidota
- Class: Flavobacteriia
- Order: Flavobacteriales
- Family: Flavobacteriaceae
- Genus: Pibocella; Nedashkovskaya et al. 2005

Species
- P. ponti

Bacterium

Pibocella is a Gram-negative heterotrophic and aerobic genus of bacteria from the family of Flavobacteriaceae with one known species Pibocella ponti. Pibocella ponti has been isolated from the alga Acrosiphonia sonderi.
