= Ascidiimonas =

Scientific classification
- Domain: Bacteria
- Kingdom: Pseudomonadati
- Phylum: Bacteroidota
- Class: Flavobacteriia
- Order: Flavobacteriales
- Family: Flavobacteriaceae
- Genus: Ascidiimonas; Yoon et al. 2016

Type species
- Ascidiimonas aurantiaca

Species
- A. aurantiaca

Genus of bacteria

Ascidiimonas is a Gram-negative, curved-rod-shaped, strictly aerobic and chemoheterotrophic genus of bacteria from the family of Flavobacteriaceae with one known species (Ascidiimonas aurantiaca). Ascidiimonas aurantiaca has been isolated from a sea squirt.
