= Paramesonia =

Scientific classification
- Domain: Bacteria
- Kingdom: Pseudomonadati
- Phylum: Bacteroidota
- Class: Flavobacteriia
- Order: Flavobacteriales
- Family: Flavobacteriaceae
- Genus: Paramesonia; Wang et al. 2020

Type species
- Paramesonia marina

Species
- P. marina

Genus of bacteria

Paramesonia is a Gram-negative, aerobic, rod-shaped and non-motile genus of bacteria from the family of Flavobacteriaceae with one known species (Paramesonia marina). Paramesonia marina has been isolated from deep-sea water from the Indian Ocean.
