= Mariniflexile =

Scientific classification
- Domain: Bacteria
- Kingdom: Pseudomonadati
- Phylum: Bacteroidota
- Class: Flavobacteriia
- Order: Flavobacteriales
- Family: Flavobacteriaceae
- Genus: Mariniflexile; Nedashkovskaya et al. 2006

Type species
- M. gromovii

Genus of bacteria

Mariniflexile is a genus in the phylum Bacteroidota (Bacteria). The various species have been recovered from sea water, sea urchins, springs, brackish water, and an oyster. It can breakdown sulphated fucans from brown algae. It was first found in the water from a water-treatment plant.

== Etymology ==
The name Mariniflexile derives from: Latin adjective marinus. Latin participle adjective flexilis -e, pliant, pliable, flexible; Neo-Latin neuter gender noun Mariniflexile, is a marine bacterium. The bacteria are rods, aerobic, move by gliding, gram negative, non-spore forming, and when grown on appropriate medium, the colonies are orange.

== Species ==
The genus contains the following species:

- M. fucanivorans ( Barbeyron et al. 2008; Neo-Latin noun fucanum, fucan (polyfucose); Latin participle adjective vorans, devouring; Neo-Latin participle adjective fucanivorans, fucan-devouring.)
- M. gromovii ( Nedashkovskaya et al. 2006, (Type species of the genus).; Neo-Latin genitive case masculine gender noun gromovii, of Gromov, in honour of B. V. Gromov, the Russian aquatic and marine microbiologist.)
- M. aquimaris ( Wayne et al. 1987; Stackebrandt & Goebel, 1994).)
- M. jejuense (2006 emend. Jung and Yoon 2013.)
- M. soesokkakense (2006 Nedashkovskaya et al.; 2006 emend. Jung and Yoon 2013.)
- M. ostreae (Park et al. 2015, sp. nov)

== See also ==
- Bacterial taxonomy
- Microbiology
- Marine microorganism
