= Seonamhaeicola =

Scientific classification
- Domain: Bacteria
- Kingdom: Pseudomonadati
- Phylum: Bacteroidota
- Class: Flavobacteriia
- Order: Flavobacteriales
- Family: Flavobacteriaceae
- Genus: Seonamhaeicola; Park et al. 2014

Type species
- Seonamhaeicola aphaedonensis

Species
- S. acroporae S. algicola S. aphaedonensis< S. marinus S. maritimus S. sediminis

Genus of bacteria

Seonamhaeicola is a genus of bacteria from the family of Flavobacteriaceae.
