= Imtechella =

Scientific classification
- Domain: Bacteria
- Kingdom: Pseudomonadati
- Phylum: Bacteroidota
- Class: Flavobacteriia
- Order: Flavobacteriales
- Family: Flavobacteriaceae
- Genus: Imtechella; Surendra et al. 2012

Type species
- Imtechella halotolerans

Species
- I. halotolerans

Genus of bacteria

Imtechella is a Gram-negative, rod-shaped, non-spore-forming and non-motile genus of bacteria from the family of Flavobacteriaceae with one known species (Imtechella halotolerans).
