= Aquibacter =

Scientific classification
- Domain: Bacteria
- Kingdom: Pseudomonadati
- Phylum: Bacteroidota
- Class: Flavobacteriia
- Order: Flavobacteriales
- Family: Flavobacteriaceae
- Genus: Aquibacter; Hameed et al. 2014

Type species
- Aquibacter zeaxanthinifaciens

Species
- A. zeaxanthinifaciens

Genus of bacteria

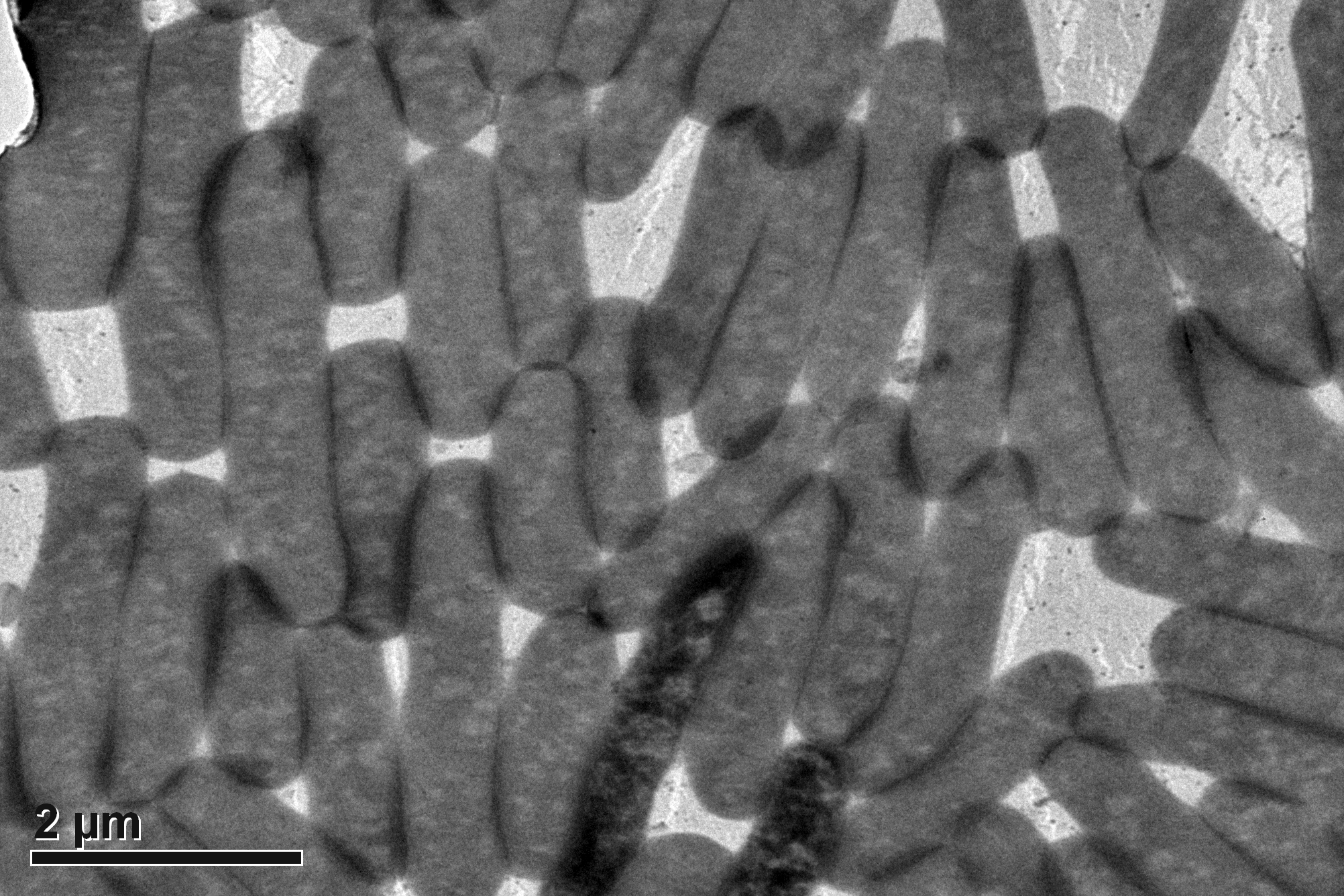
Transmission electron microscopic image of cells of Aquibacter zeaxanthinifaciens CC-AMZ-304 grown in full-strength marine broth for 48 hours.

Aquibacter is a genus from the family of Flavobacteriaceae, with one known species (Aquibacter zeaxanthinifaciens).
