= Pareuzebyella =

Scientific classification
- Domain: Bacteria
- Kingdom: Pseudomonadati
- Phylum: Bacteroidota
- Class: Flavobacteriia
- Order: Flavobacteriales
- Family: Flavobacteriaceae
- Genus: Pareuzebyella; Huang et al. 2021

Type species
- Pareuzebyella sediminis

Species
- P. sediminis

Genus of bacteria

Pareuzebyella is a Gram-negative, aerobic, rod-shaped and non-motile genus of bacteria from the family of Flavobacteriaceae with one known species (Pareuzebyella sediminis). Pareuzebyella sediminis has been isolated from tidal flat sediments.
