= Coenonia =

Scientific classification
- Domain: Bacteria
- Kingdom: Pseudomonadati
- Phylum: Bacteroidota
- Class: Flavobacteriia
- Order: Flavobacteriales
- Family: Flavobacteriaceae
- Genus: Coenonia; Vandamme et al., 1999

Type species
- Coenonia anatina

Species
- Coenonia anatina

Genus of bacteria

Coenonia is a genus of bacteria. Up to now there is only one species of this genus known: Coenonia anatina.
