= Euzebyella =

Scientific classification
- Domain: Bacteria
- Kingdom: Pseudomonadati
- Phylum: Bacteroidota
- Class: Flavobacteriia
- Order: Flavobacteriales
- Family: Flavobacteriaceae
- Genus: Euzebyella; Lucena et al. 2010

Type species
- Euzebyella saccharophila

Species
- E. algicola E. marina E. saccharophila

Genus of bacteria

Euzebyella is a genus of bacteria from the family of Flavobacteriaceae.
