= Patiriisocius =

Scientific classification
- Domain: Bacteria
- Kingdom: Pseudomonadati
- Phylum: Bacteroidota
- Class: Flavobacteriia
- Order: Flavobacteriales
- Family: Flavobacteriaceae
- Genus: Patiriisocius; Kawano et al. 2020

Type species
- Patiriisocius marinistellae

Species
- P. marinistellae P. marinus

Genus of bacteria

Patiriisocius is a genus of gram-negative bacteria from the family of Flavobacteriaceae. The genus contains two validly described species (P. marinistellae and P. marinus).
