= Pseudobizionia =

Scientific classification
- Domain: Bacteria
- Kingdom: Pseudomonadati
- Phylum: Bacteroidota
- Class: Flavobacteriia
- Order: Flavobacteriales
- Family: Flavobacteriaceae
- Genus: Pseudobizionia; Park et al. 2018

Type species
- Pseudobizionia ponticola

Species
- P. ponticola

Genus of bacteria

Pseudobizionia is a Gram-negative, aerobic and non-motile genus of bacteria from the family of Flavobacteriaceae with one known species (Pseudobizionia ponticola). Pseudobizionia ponticola has been isolated from seawater from the Yellow Sea.
