= Sediminicola =

Scientific classification
- Domain: Bacteria
- Kingdom: Pseudomonadati
- Phylum: Bacteroidota
- Class: Flavobacteriia
- Order: Flavobacteriales
- Family: Flavobacteriaceae
- Genus: Sediminicola; Khan et al. 2006

Species
- S. arcticus S. luteus

Bacterium

Sediminicola is a Gram-negative and aerobic genus of bacteria from the family of Flavobacteriaceae.
