= Amniculibacterium =

Scientific classification
- Domain: Bacteria
- Kingdom: Pseudomonadati
- Phylum: Bacteroidota
- Class: Flavobacteriia
- Order: Flavobacteriales
- Family: Flavobacteriaceae
- Genus: Amniculibacterium; Chen et al. 2020

Type species
- Amniculibacterium aquaticum

Species
- A. aquaticum

Genus of bacteria

Amniculibacterium is a Gram-negative, aerobic, non-spore-forming and non-motile genus of bacteria from the family of Flavobacteriaceae with one known species (Amniculibacterium aquaticum). Amniculibacterium aquaticum has been isolated from the Funglin Stream in Taiwan.
