= Flavivirga =

Scientific classification
- Domain: Bacteria
- Kingdom: Pseudomonadati
- Phylum: Bacteroidota
- Class: Flavobacteriia
- Order: Flavobacteriales
- Family: Flavobacteriaceae
- Genus: Flavivirga; Yi et al. 2012

Type species
- Flavivirga jejuensis

Species
- F. algicola F. amylovorans F. aquatica F. aquimarina F. eckloniae F. jejuensis F. rizhaonensis

Genus of bacteria

Flavivirga is a genus of gram-negative bacteria from the family of Flavobacteriaceae.
