= Croceitalea =

Scientific classification
- Domain: Bacteria
- Kingdom: Pseudomonadati
- Phylum: Bacteroidota
- Class: Flavobacteriia
- Order: Flavobacteriales
- Family: Flavobacteriaceae
- Genus: Croceitalea; Lee et al. 2008

Type species
- C. eckloniae

Genus of bacteria

Croceitalea is a genus in the phylum Bacteroidota (Bacteria).

== Etymology ==
The name Croceitalea derives from:
Latin adjective croceus, saffron-coloured, yellow, golden; Latin feminine gender noun talea, a slender staff, rod, stick; Neo-Latin feminine gender noun Croceitalea, a rod forming yellow-orange colonies.

== Species ==
The genus contains 2 species (including basonyms and synonyms), namely

- C. dokdonensis ( Lee et al. 2008, (Type species of the genus).; Neo-Latin feminine gender adjective dokdonensis, pertaining to Dokdo, the Korean island from where the type strain was isolated.)
- C. eckloniae ( Lee et al. 2008, (Type species of the genus).; Neo-Latin feminine gender noun Ecklonia, scientific genus name of a marine alga; Neo-Latin genitive case noun eckloniae, of Ecklonia, referring to the isolation of the type strain from Ecklonia kurome.)
- C. litorea (Kim et al. 2015)
- C. marina (Su et al. 2017)

== See also ==
- Bacterial taxonomy
- Microbiology
