= Ichthyenterobacterium =

Scientific classification
- Domain: Bacteria
- Kingdom: Pseudomonadati
- Phylum: Bacteroidota
- Class: Flavobacteriia
- Order: Flavobacteriales
- Family: Flavobacteriaceae
- Genus: Ichthyenterobacterium; Shakeela et al. 2015

Type species
- Ichthyenterobacterium magnum

Species
- I. magnum

Genus of bacteria

Ichthyenterobacterium is a Gram-negative, aerobic and pleomorphic genus of bacteria from the family of Flavobacteriaceae with one known species (Ichthyenterobacterium magnum). Ichthyenterobacterium magnum has been isolated from the intestine of the fish Paralichthys olivaceus.
