= Frondibacter =

Scientific classification
- Domain: Bacteria
- Kingdom: Pseudomonadati
- Phylum: Bacteroidota
- Class: Flavobacteriia
- Order: Flavobacteriales
- Family: Flavobacteriaceae
- Genus: Frondibacter; Yoon et al. 2015

Type species
- Frondibacter aureus

Species
- F. aureus F. mangrovi

Genus of bacteria

Frondibacter is a genus of gram-negative bacteria from the family of Flavobacteriaceae. The genus currently contains two recognized species, F. aureus and F. mangrovi.
