= Hoppeia =

Scientific classification
- Domain: Bacteria
- Kingdom: Pseudomonadati
- Phylum: Bacteroidota
- Class: Flavobacteriia
- Order: Flavobacteriales
- Family: Flavobacteriaceae
- Genus: Hoppeia; Kwon et al. 2014

Type species
- Hoppeia youngheungensis

Species
- H. youngheungensis

Genus of bacteria

Hoppeia is a Gram-negative, rod-shaped and strictly aerobic genus of bacteria from the family of Flavobacteriaceae with one known species (Hoppeia youngheungensis).
