= Spongiivirga =

Scientific classification
- Domain: Bacteria
- Kingdom: Pseudomonadati
- Phylum: Bacteroidota
- Class: Flavobacteriia
- Order: Flavobacteriales
- Family: Flavobacteriaceae
- Genus: Spongiivirga; Yoon et al. 2015

Type species
- Spongiivirga citrea

Species
- S. citrea

Genus of bacteria

Spongiivirga is a Gram-negative, strictly aerobic, rod-shaped and non-motile genus of bacteria from the family of Flavobacteriaceae with one known species (Spongiivirga citrea). Spongiivirga citrea has been isolated from the marine sponge Tethya sp..
