= Haloflavibacter =

Scientific classification
- Domain: Bacteria
- Kingdom: Pseudomonadati
- Phylum: Bacteroidota
- Class: Flavobacteriia
- Order: Flavobacteriales
- Family: Flavobacteriaceae
- Genus: Haloflavibacter; Feng et al. 2020

Type species
- Haloflavibacter putidus

Species
- H. putidus

Genus of bacteria

Haloflavibacter is a Gram-negative, rod-shaped and aerobic genus of bacteria from the family of Flavobacteriaceae with one known species (Haloflavibacter putidus). Haloflavibacter putidus has been isolated from seawater from Yantai.
