= Jejudonia =

Scientific classification
- Domain: Bacteria
- Kingdom: Pseudomonadati
- Phylum: Bacteroidota
- Class: Flavobacteriia
- Order: Flavobacteriales
- Family: Flavobacteriaceae
- Genus: Jejudonia; Park et al. 2013

Type species
- Jejudonia soesokkakensis

Species
- J. soesokkakensis

Genus of bacteria

Jejudonia is a Gram-negative, rod-shaped and non-motile genus of bacteria from the family of Flavobacteriaceae with one known species (Jejudonia soesokkakensis).
