= Pseudofulvibacter =

Scientific classification
- Domain: Bacteria
- Kingdom: Pseudomonadati
- Phylum: Bacteroidota
- Class: Flavobacteriia
- Order: Flavobacteriales
- Family: Flavobacteriaceae
- Genus: Pseudofulvibacter; Yoon et al. 2013

Type species
- Pseudofulvibacter geojedonensis

Species
- P. gastropodicola P. geojedonensis P. marinus

Genus of bacteria

Pseudofulvibacter is a genus of bacteria from the family of Flavobacteriaceae.
