= Mangrovimonas =

Scientific classification
- Domain: Bacteria
- Kingdom: Pseudomonadati
- Phylum: Bacteroidota
- Class: Flavobacteriia
- Order: Flavobacteriales
- Family: Flavobacteriaceae
- Genus: Mangrovimonas; Li et al. 2013

Species
- M. spongiae M. xylaniphaga M. yunxiaonensis

Bacterium

Mangrovimonas is a genus of bacteria from the family of Flavobacteriaceae.
