= Salinimicrobium =

Scientific classification
- Domain: Bacteria
- Kingdom: Pseudomonadati
- Phylum: Bacteroidota
- Class: Flavobacteriia
- Order: Flavobacteriales
- Family: Flavobacteriaceae
- Genus: Salinimicrobium; Lim et al. 2008

Species
- S. catena S. flavum S. gaetbulicola S. marinum S. nanhaiense S. oceani S. sediminis S. soli S. terrae S. xinjiangense

Bacterium

Salinimicrobium is a genus of bacteria from the family of Flavobacteriaceae.
