= Namhaeicola =

Scientific classification
- Domain: Bacteria
- Kingdom: Pseudomonadati
- Phylum: Bacteroidota
- Class: Flavobacteriia
- Order: Flavobacteriales
- Family: Flavobacteriaceae
- Genus: Namhaeicola; Jung et al. 2012

Type species
- Namhaeicola litoreus

Species
- N. litoreus

Genus of bacteria

Namhaeicola is a Gram-negative, pleomorphic and non-motile genus of bacteria from the family of Flavobacteriaceae with one known species (Namhaeicola litoreus). Namhaeicola litoreus has been isolated from seawater from the South Sea in Korea.
