= Hwanghaeicola =

Scientific classification
- Domain: Bacteria
- Kingdom: Pseudomonadati
- Phylum: Pseudomonadota
- Class: Alphaproteobacteria
- Order: Rhodobacterales
- Family: Rhodobacteraceae
- Genus: Hwanghaeicola; Kim et al. 2010

Type species
- Hwanghaeicola aestuarii

Species
- H. aestuarii

Genus of bacteria

Hwanghaeicola is a Gram-negative and strictly aerobic genus of bacteria from the family of Rhodobacteraceae with one known species (Hwanghaeicola aestuarii).Hwanghaeicola aestuarii has been isolated from the tidal flat sediments from the coast of Taean in Korea.
