= Gaetbulibacter =

Scientific classification
- Domain: Bacteria
- Kingdom: Pseudomonadati
- Phylum: Bacteroidota
- Class: Flavobacteriia
- Order: Flavobacteriales
- Family: Flavobacteriaceae
- Genus: Gaetbulibacter; Jung et al. 2005

Species
- G. aestuarii G. aquiaggeris G. jejuensis G. lutimaris G. marinus G. saemankumensis

Bacterium

Gaetbulibacter is a Gram-negative genus of bacteria from the family of Flavobacteriaceae.
