= Bizionia =

Scientific classification
- Domain: Bacteria
- Kingdom: Pseudomonadati
- Phylum: Bacteroidota
- Class: Flavobacteriia
- Order: Flavobacteriales
- Family: Flavobacteriaceae
- Genus: Bizionia; Nedashkovskaya et al. 2005

Type species
- Bizionia paragorgiae

Species
- B. algoritergicola B. arctica B. argentinensis B. echini B. fulviae B. gelidisalsuginis B. hallyeonensis B. myxarmorum B. paragorgiae B. psychrotolerans B. saleffrena

Genus of bacteria

Bizionia is a genus of strictly aerobic gram-negative bacteria from the family of Flavobacteriaceae which produce carotenoids. Bizionia is named after Bartolomeo Bizio.
