= Gangjinia =

Scientific classification
- Domain: Bacteria
- Kingdom: Pseudomonadati
- Phylum: Bacteroidota
- Class: Flavobacteriia
- Order: Flavobacteriales
- Family: Flavobacteriaceae
- Genus: Gangjinia; Lee et al. 2011

Type species
- Gangjinia marincola

Species
- G. marincola

Genus of bacteria

Gangjinia is a Gram-negative and strictly aerobic genus of bacteria from the family of Flavobacteriaceae with one known species (Gangjinia marincola). Gangjinia marincola has been isolated from seawater from the Gangjin Bay.
