= Saonia =

Scientific classification
- Domain: Bacteria
- Kingdom: Pseudomonadati
- Phylum: Bacteroidota
- Class: Flavobacteriia
- Order: Flavobacteriales
- Family: Flavobacteriaceae
- Genus: Saonia; Fagervold et al. 2017

Type species
- Saonia flava

Species
- S. flava

Genus of bacteria

Saonia is a Gram-negative, aerobic and rod-shaped genus of bacteria from the family of Flavobacteriaceae with one known species (Saonia flava). Saonia flava has been isolated from coastal seawater from the north-western Mediterranean Sea,
