= Jejuia =

Scientific classification
- Domain: Bacteria
- Kingdom: Pseudomonadati
- Phylum: Bacteroidota
- Class: Flavobacteriia
- Order: Flavobacteriales
- Family: Flavobacteriaceae
- Genus: Jejuia; Lee et al. 2009

Type species
- Jejuia pallidilutea

Species
- J. marina J. pallidilutea

Genus of bacteria

Jejuia is a genus of bacteria from the family of Flavobacteriaceae.
