= Lutaonella =

Scientific classification
- Domain: Bacteria
- Kingdom: Pseudomonadati
- Phylum: Bacteroidota
- Class: Flavobacteriia
- Order: Flavobacteriales
- Family: Flavobacteriaceae
- Genus: Lutaonella; Arun et al. 2009

Type species
- Lutaonella thermophila

Species
- L. thermophila

Genus of bacteria

Lutaonella is a Gram-negative, aerobic, moderately thermophilic and non-motile genus of bacteria from the family of Flavobacteriaceae with one known species (Lutaonella thermophila). Lutaonella thermophila has been isolated from a hot spring from the coast of Green Island from Taiwan.
