= Tamlana =

Scientific classification
- Domain: Bacteria
- Kingdom: Pseudomonadati
- Phylum: Bacteroidota
- Class: Flavobacteriia
- Order: Flavobacteriales
- Family: Flavobacteriaceae
- Genus: Tamlana; Lee 2007

Type species
- T. crocina

Genus of bacteria

Tamlana is a genus in the phylum Bacteroidota (Bacteria). Two species have been described so far: T. agarivorans and T. crocina.

As all members of the Bacteroidota they are Gram negative.'

They are non-flaggelate rod shaped, produced non-diffusible carotenoids (446 nm max abs, giving T. crocina its name) and use MK-6 as the respiratory quinone.

== Etymology ==
The name Tamlana derives from:

Neo-Latin feminine gender noun Tamlana, named after Tamla, the old name for Jeju Island, referring to the region where the bacterium was isolated.

The specific epithets of the species are

- T. agarivorans: Neo-Latin noun agarum, agar, algal polysaccharide; Latin v. vorare, to devour, to digest; Neo-Latin participle adjective agarivorans, agar-devouring.
- T. crocina: Latin feminine gender adjective crocina, saffron-coloured.

== See also ==
- Bacterial taxonomy
- Microbiology
