= Olleya =

Scientific classification
- Domain: Bacteria
- Kingdom: Pseudomonadati
- Phylum: Bacteroidota
- Class: Flavobacteriia
- Order: Flavobacteriales
- Family: Flavobacteriaceae
- Genus: Olleya; Mancuso Nichols et al. 2005

Type species
- Olleya marilimosa

Species
- Olleya algicola Olleya aquimaris Olleya marilimosa Olleya namhaensis Olleya sediminilitoris

Genus of bacteria

Olleya is a genus of Gram-negative, strictly aerobic and chemoheterotrophic bacteria from the family Flavobacteriaceae. Olleya is named after the microbiologist June Olley.
