= Yeosuana =

Yeosuana aromativorans

Scientific classification
- Domain: Bacteria
- Kingdom: Pseudomonadati
- Phylum: Bacteroidota
- Class: Flavobacteriia
- Order: Flavobacteriales
- Family: Flavobacteriaceae
- Genus: Yeosuana; Kwon et al. 2006
- Species: Y. aromativorans

Binomial name
- Yeosuana aromativorans Kwon et al. 2006

Genus of bacteria

Yeosuana aromativorans is a species of non-motile aerobic marine bacterium that can degrade benzopyrene. The species was first isolated from Gwangyang Bay and forms yellow-brown colonies. Growth requires chlorides of both magnesium and calcium.
