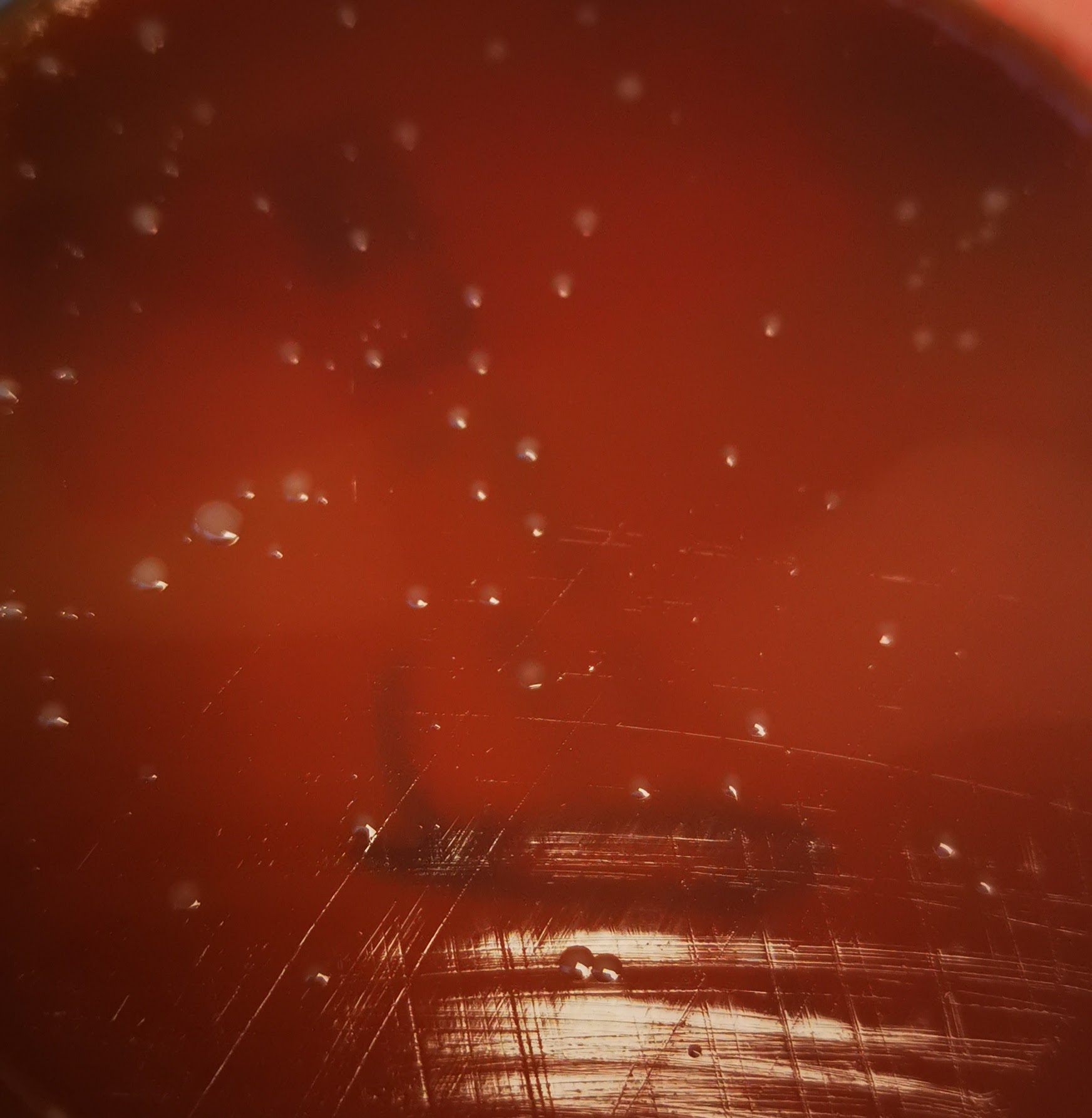
- Capnocytophaga canimorsus on a blood agar plate

Scientific classification
- Domain: Bacteria
- Kingdom: Pseudomonadati
- Phylum: Bacteroidota
- Class: Flavobacteriia
- Order: Flavobacteriales
- Family: Flavobacteriaceae; Reichenbach 1992

Genera
- See text.

= Flavobacteriaceae =

Family of bacteria

Flavobacteriaceae is a family of rod-shaped gram negative bacteria. The family contains many environmental bacteria, with some species being potential pathogens.

== History ==
The family of Flavobacteriaceae was first proposed by Reichenbach in 1989, it was approved by the IJSEM in 1992. The description of the family was emended several times in 1996 and 2002. In 2020, the family was split, with several genera moved to the newly established family of Weeksellaceae.

== Biology ==
Species of the Flavobacteriaceae are predominantly rod-shaped and stain gram-negative. Many species in the Flavobacteriaceae are motile, with most non-motile species formerly placed in the family now being placed in the Weeksellaceae. Most species are aerobic, while some are microaerobic to anaerobic; for example Capnocytophaga and Coenonia. Several members of the family are considered halophilic or psychrotolerant. The predominant respiratory quinone is menaquinone-6.

The majority of species of this family are known from a variety of environmental sources. Select species have occurred as pathogens in humans, with more genera, notably Elizabethkingia, being formerly placed in this family.

== Genera ==
The family Flavobacteriaceae comprises the following genera:

- Actibacter Kim et al. 2008
- Aequorivita Bowman and Nichols 2002
- Aestuariibaculum Jeong et al. 2013
- Aestuariimonas Park et al. 2018
- Aestuariivivens Park et al. 2015
- Algibacter Nedashkovskaya et al. 2004
- Algitalea Yoon et al. 2015
- "Algorimicrobium" García-López et al. 2019
- "Altibacter" Chen et al. 2014
- "Altuibacter" Chen et al. 2013
- Amniculibacterium Chen et al. 2020
- "Candidatus Amoebinatus" Greub et al. 2004
- Antarcticibacterium Li et al. 2018
- Antarcticimonas Yang et al. 2014
- Aquaticitalea Xamxidin et al. 2016
- Aquibacter Hameed et al. 2014
- Aquimarina Nedashkovskaya et al. 2005
- Arcticiflavibacter Liu et al. 2016
- Arenibacter Ivanova et al. 2001
- Arenitalea Zhang et al. 2013
- "Ascidiaceibacter" Chen et al. 2018
- Ascidiimonas Yoon et al. 2016
- Aurantiacicella Teramoto et al. 2016
- Aurantibacter García-López et al. 2020
- Aurantibrevibacter Cao et al. 2026
- Aurantivirga Song et al. 2015
- Aureibaculum Zhao et al. 2021
- Aureicoccus Park et al. 2013
- Aureisphaera Yoon et al. 2015
- Aureitalea Park et al. 2012
- Aureivirga Haber et al. 2013
- "Avrilella" Leyer et al. 2020
- Bizionia Nedashkovskaya et al. 2005
- Capnocytophaga Leadbetter et al. 1982
- Cellulophaga Johansen et al. 1999
- Changchengzhania Wang et al. 2017
- "Citreibacter" Yoon et al. 2018
- Citreitalea Yoon et al. 2014
- "Cochleicola" Shin et al. 2016
- Coenonia Vandamme et al. 1999
- Confluentibacter Park et al. 2016
- "Coraliitalea" Yoon et al. 2018
- Corallibacter Kim et al. 2012
- Costertonia Kwon et al. 2006
- Croceibacter Cho and Giovannoni 2003
- Croceitalea Lee et al. 2008
- Croceivirga Hu et al. 2017
- Daejeonia Siddiqi et al. 2017
- Dokdonia Yoon et al. 2005
- "Candidatus Endobryopsis" Zan et al. 2019
- Eudoraea Alain et al. 2008
- Euzebyella Lucena et al. 2010
- Faecalibacter Chen et al. 2020
- "Feifantangia" Zheng et al. 2015
- Flavicella Teramoto and Nishijima 2015
- Flavihalobacter Yin et al. 2021
- Flavimarina Nedashkovskaya et al. 2015
- Flaviramulus Einen and Øvreås 2006
- Flavivirga Yi et al. 2012
- Flavobacterium Bergey et al. 1923 (Approved Lists 1980)
- Formosa Ivanova et al. 2004
- Frondibacter Yoon et al. 2015
- "Fucobacter" Sakai et al. 2002
- Fulvibacter Khan et al. 2008
- Gaetbulibacter Jung et al. 2005
- Galbibacter Khan et al. 2007
- Gangjinia Lee et al. 2011
- Gelatiniphilus Tang et al. 2016
- Gelidibacter Bowman et al. 1997
- Geojedonia Park et al. 2013
- Gillisia Van Trappen et al. 2004
- Gilvibacter Khan et al. 2007
- Gramella Nedashkovskaya et al. 2005
- Haloflavibacter Feng et al. 2020
- Hanstruepera Hameed et al. 2015
- "Candidatus Hemobacterium" Zhang and Rikihisa 2004
- Hoppeia Kwon et al. 2014
- Hwangdonia Jung et al. 2013
- Hyunsoonleella Yoon et al. 2010
- Ichthyenterobacterium Shakeela et al. 2015
- Imtechella Surendra et al. 2012
- Jejudonia Park et al. 2013
- Jejuia Lee et al. 2009
- Joostella Quan et al. 2008
- Kordia Sohn et al. 2004
- Kriegella Nedashkovskaya et al. 2008
- Lacinutrix Bowman and Nichols 2005
- Leeuwenhoekiella Nedashkovskaya et al. 2005
- Leptobacterium Mitra et al. 2009
- Litoribaculum Jin and Jeon 2015
- Lutaonella Arun et al. 2009
- Lutibacter Choi and Cho 2006
- Lutimonas Yang et al. 2007
- Mangrovimonas Li et al. 2013
- Maribacter Nedashkovskaya et al. 2004
- Mariniflexile Nedashkovskaya et al. 2006
- Marinirhabdus Wu et al. 2016
- "Marinitalea" Kim et al. 2011
- Marinivirga Park et al. 2013
- Maritimimonas Park et al. 2009
- Marixanthomonas Romanenko et al. 2007
- Meridianimaribacter Wang et al. 2010
- Mesoflavibacter Asker et al. 2008
- Mesohalobacter Feng et al. 2020
- Mesonia Nedashkovskaya et al. 2003
- Muricauda Bruns et al. 2001
- Muriicola Kahng et al. 2010
- Myroides Vancanneyt et al. 1996
- Namhaeicola Jung et al. 2012
- Neptunitalea Yoon and Kasai 2015
- Nonlabens Lau et al. 2005
- Oceanihabitans Zhang et al. 2016
- "Ochrovirga" Kwon et al. 2014
- Olleya Mancuso Nichols et al. 2005
- Paramesonia Wang et al. 2020
- Pareuzebyella Huang et al. 2021
- Patiriisocius Kawano et al. 2020
- Paucihalobacter Wu et al. 2020
- Pelagihabitans Wang et al. 2020
- Pibocella Nedashkovskaya et al. 2005
- Planktosalinus Zhong et al. 2016
- Polaribacter Gosink et al. 1998
- Pontimicrobium Janthra et al. 2020
- Poritiphilus Wang et al. 2020
- Postechiella Lee et al. 2012
- Pricia Yu et al. 2012
- "Candidatus Prosiliicoccus" Francis et al. 2019
- Pseudobizionia Park et al. 2018
- Pseudofulvibacter Yoon et al. 2013
- Pseudotenacibaculum Huang et al. 2016
- Pseudozobellia Nedashkovskaya et al. 2009
- Psychroflexus Bowman et al. 1999
- Psychroserpens Bowman et al. 1997
- "Pukyongia" Kim et al. 2020
- Pustulibacterium Wang et al. 2013
- Robertkochia Hameed et al. 2014
- Robiginitalea Cho and Giovannoni 2004
- Sabulilitoribacter Park et al. 2014
- Salegentibacter McCammon and Bowman 2000
- Salinimicrobium Lim et al. 2008
- Saonia Fagervold et al. 2017
- Sediminibacter Khan et al. 2007
- Sediminicola Khan et al. 2006
- Seonamhaeicola Park et al. 2014
- Siansivirga Hameed et al. 2013
- Sinomicrobium Xu et al. 2013
- Snuella Yi and Chun 2011
- "Spodiobacter" Tomida et al. 2019
- Spongiiferula Yoon et al. 2016
- Spongiimicrobium Yoon et al. 2016
- Spongiivirga Yoon et al. 2015
- "Spongitalea" Mitra et al. 2012
- Subsaxibacter Bowman and Nichols 2005
- Subsaximicrobium Bowman and Nichols 2005
- "Sufflavibacter" Kwon et al. 2007
- Sungkyunkwania Yoon et al. 2013
- Taeania Jung et al. 2016
- Tamlana Lee 2007
- Tenacibaculum Suzuki et al. 2001
- Ulvibacter Nedashkovskaya et al. 2004
- Ulvibacterium Zhang et al. 2021
- Urechidicola Shin and Yi 2020
- "Vaginella" Diop et al. 2017
- Wenyingzhuangia Liu et al. 2014
- Winogradskyella Nedashkovskaya et al. 2005
- Wocania He et al. 2020
- Xanthomarina Vaidya et al. 2015
- Yeosuana Kwon et al. 2006
- Zeaxanthinibacter Asker et al. 2007
- Zhouia Liu et al. 2006
- Zobellia Barbeyron et al. 2001
- Zunongwangia corrig. Qin et al. 2007

== Phylogeny ==
The currently accepted taxonomy is based on the List of Prokaryotic names with Standing in Nomenclature and the phylogeny is based on whole-genome sequences. (Note: Actibacter, Aestuariibaculum, Aestuariimonas, Aestuariivivens, Algitalea, Amniculibacterium, Antarcticibacterium, Antarcticimonas, Aquaticitalea, Aquibacter, Arcticiflavibacter, Ascidiimonas, Aurantiacicella, Aurantivirga, Aureibaculum, Aureisphaera, Aureivirga, Changchengzhania, Citreitalea, Coenonia, Corallibacter, Costertonia, Daejeonia, Euzebyella, Faecalibacter, Flavicella, Flavihalobacter, Flavimarina, Frondibacter, Fulvibacter, Gangjinia, Gelatiniphilus, Geojedonia, Gilvibacter, Haloflavibacter, Hoppeia, Hwangdonia, Jejudonia, Leptobacterium, Litoribaculum, Lutaonella, Lutimonas, Mariniflexile, Marinivirga, Maritimimonas, Marixanthomonas, Meridianimaribacter, Mesohalobacter, Namhaeicola, Neptunitalea, Paramesonia, Pareuzebyella, Patiriisocius, Paucihalobacter, Pelagihabitans, Pibocella, Planktosalinus, Pontimicrobium, Poritiphilus, Postechiella, Pseudobizionia, Pseudofulvibacter, Pseudotenacibaculum, Robertkochia, Sabulilitoribacter, Saonia, Sediminibacter, Sediminicola, Seonamhaeicola, Snuella, Spongiiferula, Spongiimicrobium, Spongiivirga, Subsaxibacter, Subsaximicrobium, Sungkyunkwania, Taeania, Ulvibacterium, Urechidicola, Wocania, and Yeosuana are not included in this phylogenetic tree.)

- - Flavobacteriaceae
    - - - Flavobacterium
        - Myroides
      - - Capnocytophaga
        - - - Pustulibacterium
            - Imtechella
          - - - - Zhouia
                - - Joostella
                  - Galbibacter
              - - - - Aureitalea
                    - - Marinirhabdus
                      - - Ulvibacter
                        - Aequorivita
                  - - - Nonlabens
                      - - Leeuwenhoekiella
                        - Dokdonia
                    - - Aquimarina
                      - - Croceibacter
                        - - - Psychroflexus
                            - Mesonia
                          - - Salinimicrobium
                            - - Gillisia
                              - - Salegentibacter
                                - - Gramella
                                  - Zunongwangia
                - - Kordia
                  - - - Aurantibacter
                      - - - Mesoflavibacter
                          - Olleya
                        - - Bizionia
                          - Flavirhabdus
                    - - - Winogradskyella
                        - - Gelidibacter
                          - - Ichthyenterobacterium
                            - Psychroserpens
                      - - - - Oceanihabitans
                            - Lacinutrix
                          - - - Mangrovimonas
                              - Formosa
                            - - Xanthomarina
                              - - Hanstruepera
                                - "Algorimicrobium"
                        - - - Tamlana
                            - Algibacter
                          - - - - Gaetbulibacter
                                - Siansivirga
                              - Confluentibacter
                            - - Flavivirga
                              - - Flaviramulus
                                - - Arenitalea
                                  - - Jejuia
                                    - Hyunsoonleella
            - - Sinomicrobium
              - - - Aureicoccus
                  - - - Croceivirga
                      - Croceitalea
                    - Muricauda
                - - Robiginitalea
                  - - Zeaxanthinibacter
                    - - Muriicola
                      - - Eudoraea
                        - - Arenibacter
                          - - Cellulophaga
                            - - Maribacter
                              - - Kriegella
                                - - Pricia
                                  - - Pseudozobellia
                                    - Zobellia
    - - Wenyingzhuangia
      - - Lutibacter
        - - Tenacibaculum
          - Polaribacter
  - outgroup
    Ichthyobacteriaceae
