= Crocinitomix algicola =

Scientific classification
- Domain: Bacteria
- Kingdom: Pseudomonadati
- Phylum: Bacteroidota
- Class: Flavobacteriia
- Order: Flavobacteriales
- Family: Cryomorphaceae
- Genus: Crocinitomix
- Species: C. algicola

Binomial name
- Crocinitomix algicola Shi et al. 2017

Type strain
- KCTC 42868, MCCC 1H00128, strain 0182

Synonyms
- Crocinitomix agarivorans

Species of bacterium

Crocinitomix algicola is a Gram-negative, strictly aerobic and rod-shaped bacterium from the genus of Crocinitomix which has been isolated from the algae Gracilaria blodgettii from Lingshui in China.
