= Flavobacterium branchiarum =

Scientific classification
- Domain: Bacteria
- Kingdom: Pseudomonadati
- Phylum: Bacteroidota
- Class: Flavobacteriia
- Order: Flavobacteriales
- Family: Flavobacteriaceae
- Genus: Flavobacterium
- Species: F. branchiarum

Binomial name
- Flavobacterium branchiarum Zamora et al. 2016

Type strain
- CCUG 60095, CECT 7908, 57B-2-09

Species of bacterium

Flavobacterium branchiarum is a bacterium from the genus of Flavobacterium which can cause bacterial gill disease in rainbow trouts.
