= Flavobacterium branchiophilum =

Scientific classification
- Domain: Bacteria
- Kingdom: Pseudomonadati
- Phylum: Bacteroidota
- Class: Flavobacteriia
- Order: Flavobacteriales
- Family: Flavobacteriaceae
- Genus: Flavobacterium
- Species: F. branchiophilum

Binomial name
- Flavobacterium branchiophilum Wakabayashi et al., 1989

Species of bacterium

Flavobacterium branchiophilum is a species of gram-negative bacteria from the family Flavobacteriaceae. The species is best known as an etiologic agent of bacterial gill disease (BGD), a disease of freshwater fish, especially in intensively reared salmonids. The bacterium primarily colonizes the gills, where infection is associated with epithelial proliferation, impaired respiration, and increased mortality under stressful rearing conditions.

== Taxonomy ==
F. branchiophilum was validly described in 1989 as Flavobacterium branchiophila. The spelling F. branchiophilum is now treated as the correct name. The species belongs to the genus Flavobacterium, which includes several fish-associated bacterial pathogens, including F. columnare and F. psychrophilum.

== Phenotypic characteristics ==
F. branchiophilum is a gram-negative, rod-shaped bacterium. The species is non-motile and non-sporeforming.

F. branchiophilum can be grown on cytophaga media. The species tolerates temperatures between 10 and 25 °C, with optimum growth occurring at 18 °C. F. branchiophilum is a notoriously slow growing bacterium, with colonies only appearing after 2 to 5 days of incubation. Colonies are light yellow, smooth, and round.

== Bacterial gill disease ==
F. branchiophilum is the most common etiologic agent in bacterial gill disease (BGD), a highly contagious, respiratory condition that affects fish. Smaller fish are more susceptible to the BGD. Acute outbreaks can result daily losses of as high as 20 to 50% of the stock.

=== Pathogenesis ===
F. branchiophilum colonizes the gills of fish. Under stressful conditions such as poor water quality or overcrowding, F. branchiophilum can grow excessively. The immune response of the fish causes an expansion of the epithelial cells in the gills, and the increased thickness in epithelial layer reduces the capacity of the gills to facilitate gas exchange.

== Antimicrobial susceptibility ==
Data on antimicrobial susceptibility in Flavobacterium branchiophilum is scarce. The bacterium is unable to grow under conditions used in standardized susceptibility testing, and modification of standard broth microdilution methods must be used. Due to the limited number of isolates that have been examined for antimicrobial susceptibility, there are no widely established epidemiological cutoff values, and formal susceptibility and resistance patterns have not been determined.

Whole-genome sequencing has not identified any known antimicrobial resistance genes in the small number of isolates examined to date.
