= Brumimicrobium glaciale =

Scientific classification
- Domain: Bacteria
- Kingdom: Pseudomonadati
- Phylum: Bacteroidota
- Class: Flavobacteriia
- Order: Flavobacteriales
- Family: Crocinitomicaceae
- Genus: Brumimicrobium
- Species: B. glaciale

Binomial name
- Brumimicrobium glaciale Bowman et al. 2003

Species of bacterium

Brumimicrobium glaciale is a bacterium. It is gliding, rod-like and facultatively anaerobic with a fermentative metabolism.
