= Flavobacterium dispersum =

Scientific classification
- Domain: Bacteria
- Kingdom: Pseudomonadati
- Phylum: Bacteroidota
- Class: Flavobacteriia
- Order: Flavobacteriales
- Family: Flavobacteriaceae
- Genus: Flavobacterium
- Species: F. dispersum

Binomial name
- Flavobacterium dispersum Chen et al. 2017

Type strain
- BCRC 80978, KCTC 52234, LMG 29558, strain MVW-23

Species of bacterium

Flavobacterium dispersum is a Gram-negative, strictly aerobic and motile bacterium from the genus of Flavobacterium which has been isolated from a freshwater spring in Taiwan.

A novel bacterial strain MVW-23T was isolated from a freshwater spring in Taiwan. The strain was Gram-staining-negative, strictly aerobic, motile by gliding, rod-shaped and formed translucent yellow colonies. Optimal growth occurred at 20–30 °C (68–86 °F), pH 7.0, and in the presence of 0.5–1 % NaCl.
