= Flavobacterium cheonanense =

Scientific classification
- Domain: Bacteria
- Kingdom: Pseudomonadati
- Phylum: Bacteroidota
- Class: Flavobacteriia
- Order: Flavobacteriales
- Family: Flavobacteriaceae
- Genus: Flavobacterium
- Species: F. cheonanense

Binomial name
- Flavobacterium cheonanense Lee et al. 2012

Type strain
- ARSA-108, JCM 17069, KACC 14972, KCTC 23184

Species of bacterium

Flavobacterium cheonanense is a bacterium from the genus of Flavobacterium.
