= Flavobacterium aciduliphilum =

Scientific classification
- Domain: Bacteria
- Kingdom: Pseudomonadati
- Phylum: Bacteroidota
- Class: Flavobacteriia
- Order: Flavobacteriales
- Family: Flavobacteriaceae
- Genus: Flavobacterium
- Species: F. aciduliphilum

Binomial name
- Flavobacterium aciduliphilum Kang et al. 2013

Type strain
- JJ013, JCM 18211, KACC 16594

Species of bacterium

Flavobacterium aciduliphilum is a Gram-negative, rod-shaped and non-motile bacterium from the genus of Flavobacterium which has been isolated from freshwater from a lake in Jeollabuk-do in Korea.
