= Crocinitomix =

Scientific classification
- Domain: Bacteria
- Kingdom: Pseudomonadati
- Phylum: Bacteroidota
- Class: Flavobacteriia
- Order: Flavobacteriales
- Family: Cryomorphaceae
- Genus: Crocinitomix; Bowman et al. 2003

Type species
- Crocinitomix catalasitica

Species
- C. algicola; C. catalasitica

Genus of bacteria

Crocinitomix is a genus in the phylum Bacteroidota (Bacteria).

== Etymology ==
The name Crocinitomix means saffron-coloured thread, derived from the Latin adjective crocinus, of or pertaining to saffron and tomix, a string or thread.

== Species ==
The genus contains the species Crocinitomix algicola and C. catalasitica. C. catalasitica Bowman et al., 2003 is the type species of the genus. Its name derives from the Neo-Latin catalasum, meaning catalase, and Latin -tica, a suffix used in adjectives with the sense of relating to, pertaining to the ability of this species to produce catalase.
