= Brumimicrobium =

Scientific classification
- Domain: Bacteria
- Kingdom: Pseudomonadati
- Phylum: Bacteroidota
- Class: Flavobacteriia
- Order: Flavobacteriales
- Family: Crocinitomicaceae
- Genus: Brumimicrobium; Bowman et al. 2003

Type species
- Brumimicrobium glaciale

Species
- B. glaciale B. mesophilum

Genus of bacteria

Brumimicrobium is a Gram-negative and chemoheterotrophic bacterial genus from the family of Crocinitomicaceae.
