= Cryomorpha =

Scientific classification
- Domain: Bacteria
- Kingdom: Pseudomonadati
- Phylum: Bacteroidota
- Class: Flavobacteriia
- Order: Flavobacteriales
- Family: Cryomorphaceae
- Genus: Cryomorpha; Bowman et al. 2003, (Type genus of the family Cryomorphaceae Bowman et al. 2003).

Type species
- C. ignava

Genus of bacteria

Cryomorpha is a genus of gram-negative bacteria in the phylum Bacteroidota (Bacteria).

== Etymology ==
The name Cryomorpha derives from: Greek noun kruos, icy cold, frost; Greek feminine gender noun morphē, shape or form; Neo-Latin feminine gender noun Cryomorpha, cold shape.

== Species ==
The genus contains a single species, namely C. ignava ( Bowman et al. 2003, (Type species of the genus).; Latin feminine gender adjective ignava, lazy, pertaining to the biochemically and nutritionally inert nature of the species.)

== See also ==
- Bacterial taxonomy
- Microbiology
