= Flavobacterium crassostreae =

Scientific classification
- Domain: Bacteria
- Kingdom: Pseudomonadati
- Phylum: Bacteroidota
- Class: Flavobacteriia
- Order: Flavobacteriales
- Family: Flavobacteriaceae
- Genus: Flavobacterium
- Species: F. crassostreae

Binomial name
- Flavobacterium crassostreae Choi et al. 2017

Type strain
- JCM 31219, KACC 18706, LPB0076

Species of bacterium

Flavobacterium crassostreae is a Gram-negative and rod-shaped bacterium from the genus of Flavobacterium which has been isolated from a Pacific oyster.
