= Flavobacterium cheonhonense =

Scientific classification
- Domain: Bacteria
- Kingdom: Pseudomonadati
- Phylum: Bacteroidota
- Class: Flavobacteriia
- Order: Flavobacteriales
- Family: Flavobacteriaceae
- Genus: Flavobacterium
- Species: F. cheonhonense

Binomial name
- Flavobacterium cheonhonense Lee et al. 2014

Type strain
- JCM 17064, KACC 14967, KCTC 23180, ARSA-15

Species of bacterium

Flavobacterium cheonhonense is a bacterium from the genus of Flavobacterium which has been isolated from water from the Cheonho reservoir from Cheonan in Korea.
