= Flavobacterium dankookense =

Scientific classification
- Domain: Bacteria
- Kingdom: Pseudomonadati
- Phylum: Bacteroidota
- Class: Flavobacteriia
- Order: Flavobacteriales
- Family: Flavobacteriaceae
- Genus: Flavobacterium
- Species: F. dankookense

Binomial name
- Flavobacterium dankookense Lee et al. 2012

Type strain
- ARSA-19, JCM 17065, KACC 14968, KCTC 23179

Species of bacterium

Flavobacterium dankookense is a Gram-negative, rod-shaped and strictly aerobic bacterium from the genus of Flavobacterium which has been isolated from a freshwater lake from Cheonan in Korea.
