= Flavobacterium faecale =

Scientific classification
- Domain: Bacteria
- Kingdom: Pseudomonadati
- Phylum: Bacteroidota
- Class: Flavobacteriia
- Order: Flavobacteriales
- Family: Flavobacteriaceae
- Genus: Flavobacterium
- Species: F. faecale

Binomial name
- Flavobacterium faecale Kim et al. 2014

Type strain
- CECT 8384, KCTC 32457, WV33

Synonyms
- Flavobacterium faecalis

Species of bacterium

Flavobacterium faecale is a Gram-negative, rod-shaped and strictly aerobic bacterium from the genus of Flavobacterium which has been isolated from the faeces of antarctic penguins.
