= Flavobacterium chungnamense =

Scientific classification
- Domain: Bacteria
- Kingdom: Pseudomonadati
- Phylum: Bacteroidota
- Class: Flavobacteriia
- Order: Flavobacteriales
- Family: Flavobacteriaceae
- Genus: Flavobacterium
- Species: F. chungnamense

Binomial name
- Flavobacterium chungnamense Lee et al. 2012

Type strain
- JCM 17068, KACC 14971, KCTC 23183, ARSA-103

Species of bacterium

Flavobacterium chungnamense is a Gram-negative, aerobic, rod-shaped and non-motile bacterium from the genus of Flavobacterium.
