= Flavobacterium aquidurense =

Scientific classification
- Domain: Bacteria
- Kingdom: Pseudomonadati
- Phylum: Bacteroidota
- Class: Flavobacteriia
- Order: Flavobacteriales
- Family: Flavobacteriaceae
- Genus: Flavobacterium
- Species: F. aquidurense

Binomial name
- Flavobacterium aquidurense Cousin et al. 2007

Type strain
- CIP 109242, DSM 18293, KCTC 22840, WB 1.1-56

Species of bacterium

Flavobacterium aquidurense is a Gram-negative and chemoheterotrophic bacterium from the genus of Flavobacterium which has been isolated from water from the Westhöfer Bach in Germany.
