= Flavobacterium compostarboris =

Scientific classification
- Domain: Bacteria
- Kingdom: Pseudomonadati
- Phylum: Bacteroidota
- Class: Flavobacteriia
- Order: Flavobacteriales
- Family: Flavobacteriaceae
- Genus: Flavobacterium
- Species: F. compostarboris

Binomial name
- Flavobacterium compostarboris Kim et al. 2012

Type strain
- JCM 16527, KACC 14224, strain 15C3

Species of bacterium

Flavobacterium compostarboris is a Gram-negative and aerobic bacterium from the genus of Flavobacterium which has been isolated from leaf-and-branch compost from the Expo Commemoration Park in Osaka in Japan.
