= Myroides guanonis =

Scientific classification
- Domain: Bacteria
- Kingdom: Pseudomonadati
- Phylum: Bacteroidota
- Class: Flavobacteriia
- Order: Flavobacteriales
- Family: Flavobacteriaceae
- Genus: Myroides
- Species: M. guanonis

Binomial name
- Myroides guanonis Tomova et al. 2013

Type strain
- IM13

Synonyms
- Myroides guanensis

Species of bacterium

Myroides guanonis is a psychrotolerant, strictly aerobic, rod-shaped and non-motile bacterium from the genus of Myroides which has been isolated from a prehistoric painting from the Magura Cave in Bulgaria.
