= Flavobacterium xanthum =

Scientific classification
- Domain: Bacteria
- Kingdom: Pseudomonadati
- Phylum: Bacteroidota
- Class: Flavobacteriia
- Order: Flavobacteriales
- Family: Flavobacteriaceae
- Genus: Flavobacterium
- Species: F. xanthum

Binomial name
- Flavobacterium xanthum McCammon and Bowman 2000

Species of bacterium

Flavobacterium xanthum is a species of gram-negative bacteria isolated from various Antarctic habitats.
