= Flavobacterium agri =

Scientific classification
- Domain: Bacteria
- Kingdom: Pseudomonadati
- Phylum: Bacteroidota
- Class: Flavobacteriia
- Order: Flavobacteriales
- Family: Flavobacteriaceae
- Genus: Flavobacterium
- Species: F. agri

Binomial name
- Flavobacterium agri Akter et al. 2021

Type strain
- MAH-1

Species of bacterium

Flavobacterium agri is a Gram-negative, strictly aerobic, rod-shaped and non-motile bacterium from the genus of Flavobacterium which has been isolated from rhizospheric soil of the plant Coriandrum sativum.
