= Flavobacterium anatoliense =

Scientific classification
- Domain: Bacteria
- Kingdom: Pseudomonadati
- Phylum: Bacteroidota
- Class: Flavobacteriia
- Order: Flavobacteriales
- Family: Flavobacteriaceae
- Genus: Flavobacterium
- Species: F. anatoliense

Binomial name
- Flavobacterium anatoliense Kacagan et al. 2013

Type strain
- Canakci MK3, LMG 26441, MK3, NCCB 100384

Synonyms
- Flavobacterium anatolia

Species of bacterium

Flavobacterium anatoliense is a Gram-negative, rod-shaped and strictly aerobic bacterium from the genus of Flavobacterium which has been isolated from fresh water from Trabzon in Turkey.
