= Flavobacterium flevense =

Scientific classification
- Domain: Bacteria
- Kingdom: Pseudomonadati
- Phylum: Bacteroidota
- Class: Flavobacteriia
- Order: Flavobacteriales
- Family: Flavobacteriaceae
- Genus: Flavobacterium
- Species: F. flevense

Binomial name
- Flavobacterium flevense (van der Meulen et al. 1974) Bernardet et al. 1996

Synonyms
- Cytophaga flevensis

Species of bacterium

Flavobacterium flevense is a freshwater agar-degrading bacterium in the order Flavobacteriales. It is a gram-negative bacterium capable of surviving extreme cold temperatures (psychrophilic).

It was first isolated in IJsselmeer, an inland bay in the Netherlands that is believed to have gradually separated from the open North Sea. It does not produce flexirubin type pigments, making it an outlier in the non-marine Cytophaga-Flavobacteria species. Therefore, it is hypothesized that F. flevense was originally a marine organism without flexirubin pigment, that gradually adapted to freshwater conditions as the seawater was supplemented with freshwater.
