= Flavobacterium ceti =

Scientific classification
- Domain: Bacteria
- Kingdom: Pseudomonadati
- Phylum: Bacteroidota
- Class: Flavobacteriia
- Order: Flavobacteriales
- Family: Flavobacteriaceae
- Genus: Flavobacterium
- Species: F. ceti

Binomial name
- Flavobacterium ceti Vela et al. 2007

Type strain
- 454-2, CCUG 52969, CECT 7184, CECT 7184, CIP 109811

Synonyms
- Cetobacillus canariasensis

Species of bacterium

Flavobacterium ceti is a Gram-negative bacterium from the genus of Flavobacterium which has been isolated from the lung and liver of the whale Ziphius cavirostris.
