= Flavobacterium collinsense =

Scientific classification
- Domain: Bacteria
- Kingdom: Pseudomonadati
- Phylum: Bacteroidota
- Class: Flavobacteriia
- Order: Flavobacteriales
- Family: Flavobacteriaceae
- Genus: Flavobacterium
- Species: F. collinsense

Binomial name
- Flavobacterium collinsense Zhang et al. 2016

Type strain
- CCTCC AB 2014004, LMG 28257, strain 4-T-2

Synonyms
- Flavobacterium luojiasis

Species of bacterium

Flavobacterium collinsense is a Gram-negative, aerobic and rod-shaped bacterium from the genus of Flavobacterium which has been isolated from till from the Collins glacier front on the Antarctica.
