= Acidiluteibacter =

Scientific classification
- Domain: Bacteria
- Kingdom: Pseudomonadati
- Phylum: Bacteroidota
- Class: Flavobacteriia
- Order: Flavobacteriales
- Family: Cryomorphaceae
- Genus: Acidiluteibacter; Gui et al. 2020

Species
- A. ferrifornacis

Genus of bacteria

Acidiluteibacter is a Gram-negative genus of bacteria from the family of Cryomorphaceae with one known species (Acidiluteibacter ferrifornacis).
