= Flavobacterium croceum =

Scientific classification
- Domain: Bacteria
- Kingdom: Pseudomonadati
- Phylum: Bacteroidota
- Class: Flavobacteriia
- Order: Flavobacteriales
- Family: Flavobacteriaceae
- Genus: Flavobacterium
- Species: F. croceum

Binomial name
- Flavobacterium croceum Park et al. 2006

Type strain
- CIP 109940, DSM 17960, EMB47, KCTC 12611

Species of bacterium

Flavobacterium croceum is a Gram-negative, rod-shaped and non-motile bacterium from the genus of Flavobacterium which has been isolated from activated sludge from Pohang in Korea.
