= Flavobacterium chungbukense =

Scientific classification
- Domain: Bacteria
- Kingdom: Pseudomonadati
- Phylum: Bacteroidota
- Class: Flavobacteriia
- Order: Flavobacteriales
- Family: Flavobacteriaceae
- Genus: Flavobacterium
- Species: F. chungbukense

Binomial name
- Flavobacterium chungbukense Lim et al. 2011

Type strain
- JCM 17386, KACC 15048, CS100

Species of bacterium

Flavobacterium chungbukense is a Gram-negative, strictly aerobic, rod-shaped and non-motile bacterium from the genus of Flavobacterium which has been isolated from soil from Chungbuk in Korea.
