= Flavobacterium daemonensis =

Scientific classification
- Domain: Bacteria
- Kingdom: Pseudomonadati
- Phylum: Bacteroidota
- Class: Flavobacteriia
- Order: Flavobacteriales
- Family: Flavobacteriaceae
- Genus: Flavobacterium
- Species: F. daemonensis

Binomial name
- Flavobacterium daemonensis Ngo et al. 2015

Type strain
- JCM 19455, KACC 17651, THG-DJ7

Synonyms
- Flavobacterium daemonense

Species of bacterium

Flavobacterium daemonensis is a Gram-negative, obligately aerobic and motile bacterium from the genus of Flavobacterium which has been isolated from soil from the Daemo Mountain in Korea.
