= Flavobacterium branchiicola =

Scientific classification
- Domain: Bacteria
- Kingdom: Pseudomonadati
- Phylum: Bacteroidota
- Class: Flavobacteriia
- Order: Flavobacteriales
- Family: Flavobacteriaceae
- Genus: Flavobacterium
- Species: F. branchiicola

Binomial name
- Flavobacterium branchiicola Zamora et al. 2016

Type strain
- CCUG 60096, CECT 7790, 59B-3-09

Species of bacterium

Flavobacterium branchiicola is a species of gram-negative bacterium from the genus of Flavobacterium.
