= Myroides odoratimimus =

Scientific classification
- Domain: Bacteria
- Kingdom: Pseudomonadati
- Phylum: Bacteroidota
- Class: Flavobacteriia
- Order: Flavobacteriales
- Family: Flavobacteriaceae
- Genus: Myroides
- Species: M. odoratimimus

Binomial name
- Myroides odoratimimus Vancanneyt et al. 1996

Species of bacterium

Myroides odoratimimus is an obligate aerobic, gram negative bacterium. Although it has been isolated from a range of bodily fluids, it is a rare opportunistic pathogen. Myroides species are commonly found in the environment. Infections can occur following contact with contaminated water.
