= Flavobacterium ahnfeltiae =

Scientific classification
- Domain: Bacteria
- Kingdom: Pseudomonadati
- Phylum: Bacteroidota
- Class: Flavobacteriia
- Order: Flavobacteriales
- Family: Flavobacteriaceae
- Genus: Flavobacterium
- Species: F. ahnfeltiae

Binomial name
- Flavobacterium ahnfeltiae Nedashkovskaya et al. 2015

Type strain
- KCTC 32467, KMM 6686, 10Alg 130

Species of bacterium

Flavobacterium ahnfeltiae is a Gram-negative, polysaccharide-degrading, aerobic, rod-shaped and motile bacterium from the genus of Flavobacterium which has been isolated from the alga Ahnfeltia tobuchiensis.
