= Flavobacterium anhuiense =

Scientific classification
- Domain: Bacteria
- Kingdom: Pseudomonadati
- Phylum: Bacteroidota
- Class: Flavobacteriia
- Order: Flavobacteriales
- Family: Flavobacteriaceae
- Genus: Flavobacterium
- Species: F. anhuiense

Binomial name
- Flavobacterium anhuiense Liu et al. 2008

Type strain
- CGMCC 1.6859, D3, JCM 14864, KCTC 22128

Species of bacterium

Flavobacterium anhuiense is a Gram-negative bacterium from the genus of Flavobacterium which has been isolated from soil from the Anhui Province in China.
