= Flavobacterium brevivitae =

Scientific classification
- Domain: Bacteria
- Kingdom: Pseudomonadati
- Phylum: Bacteroidota
- Class: Flavobacteriia
- Order: Flavobacteriales
- Family: Flavobacteriaceae
- Genus: Flavobacterium
- Species: F. brevivitae

Binomial name
- Flavobacterium brevivitae Chen et al. 2016

Type strain
- BCRC 80913, TTM-43, KCTC 42744, LMG 29004

Species of bacterium

Flavobacterium brevivitae is a Gram-negative, strictly aerobic and motile bacterium from the genus of Flavobacterium which has been isolated from water from the Caohu River in Taiwan.
