= Flavobacterium caeni =

Scientific classification
- Domain: Bacteria
- Kingdom: Pseudomonadati
- Phylum: Bacteroidota
- Class: Flavobacteriia
- Order: Flavobacteriales
- Family: Flavobacteriaceae
- Genus: Flavobacterium
- Species: F. caeni

Binomial name
- Flavobacterium caeni Liu et al. 2010

Type strain
- CGMCC 1.7031, NBRC 104239, LM5

Species of bacterium

Flavobacterium caeni is a Gram-negative, heterotrophic, non-spore-forming, aerobic and non-motile bacterium from the genus of Flavobacterium which has been isolated from activated sludge from a sequencing batch reactor.
