= Flavobacterium buctense =

Scientific classification
- Domain: Bacteria
- Kingdom: Pseudomonadati
- Phylum: Bacteroidota
- Class: Flavobacteriia
- Order: Flavobacteriales
- Family: Flavobacteriaceae
- Genus: Flavobacterium
- Species: F. buctense

Binomial name
- Flavobacterium buctense Feng et al. 2016

Type strain
- CGMCC 1.15216, JCM 30750, strain T7

Species of bacterium

Flavobacterium buctense is a Gram-negative and aerobic bacterium from the genus of Flavobacterium which has been isolated from water from the Chishui River from Guizhou in China.
