= Myroides marinus =

Scientific classification
- Domain: Bacteria
- Kingdom: Pseudomonadati
- Phylum: Bacteroidota
- Class: Flavobacteriia
- Order: Flavobacteriales
- Family: Flavobacteriaceae
- Genus: Myroides
- Species: M. marinus

Binomial name
- Myroides marinus Cho et al. 2011

Type strain
- JS-08

Bacterium

Myroides marinus is a Gram-negative, rod-shaped, aerobic and non-motile bacterium from the genus of Myroides which has been isolated from seawater.
