= Flavobacterium eburneum =

Scientific classification
- Domain: Bacteria
- Kingdom: Pseudomonadati
- Phylum: Bacteroidota
- Class: Flavobacteriia
- Order: Flavobacteriales
- Family: Flavobacteriaceae
- Genus: Flavobacterium
- Species: F. eburneum

Binomial name
- Flavobacterium eburneum Hwang et al. 2017

Type strain
- JCM 31221, KACC 18743, strain SA31

Species of bacterium

Flavobacterium eburneum is a Gram-negative and motile bacterium from the genus of Flavobacterium which has been isolated from soil from Taean-gun in Korea.
