= Flavobacterium enshiense =

Scientific classification
- Domain: Bacteria
- Kingdom: Pseudomonadati
- Phylum: Bacteroidota
- Class: Flavobacteriia
- Order: Flavobacteriales
- Family: Flavobacteriaceae
- Genus: Flavobacterium
- Species: F. enshiense

Binomial name
- Flavobacterium enshiense Gao et al. 2015

Type strain
- CCTCC AB 2011144, DK69, KCTC 23775, LMG 28473

Species of bacterium

Flavobacterium enshiense is a Gram-negative and strictly aerobic bacterium from the genus of Flavobacterium which has been isolated from soil from Enshi City in China.
