= Myroides profundi =

Scientific classification
- Domain: Bacteria
- Kingdom: Pseudomonadati
- Phylum: Bacteroidota
- Class: Flavobacteriia
- Order: Flavobacteriales
- Family: Flavobacteriaceae
- Genus: Myroides
- Species: M. profundi

Binomial name
- Myroides profundi Zhang et al. 2009

Type strain
- D25

Bacterium

Myroides profundi is a Gram-negative, aerobic and non-motile bacterium from the genus of Myroides which has been isolated from deep-sea sediments from the southern Okinawa Trough.
