= Flavobacterium dongtanense =

Scientific classification
- Domain: Bacteria
- Kingdom: Pseudomonadati
- Phylum: Bacteroidota
- Class: Flavobacteriia
- Order: Flavobacteriales
- Family: Flavobacteriaceae
- Genus: Flavobacterium
- Species: F. dongtanense

Binomial name
- Flavobacterium dongtanense Xiao et al. 2011

Type strain
- CCTCC AB 209201, CIP 110399, KCTC 22671, LW30

Species of bacterium

Flavobacterium dongtanense is a Gram-negative, aerobic, rod-shaped, non-spore-forming and non-motile bacterium from the genus of Flavobacterium which has been isolated from the rhizosphere of wetland reed from Dongtan in China.
