= Flavobacterium collinsii =

Scientific classification
- Domain: Bacteria
- Kingdom: Pseudomonadati
- Phylum: Bacteroidota
- Class: Flavobacteriia
- Order: Flavobacteriales
- Family: Flavobacteriaceae
- Genus: Flavobacterium
- Species: F. collinsii

Binomial name
- Flavobacterium collinsii Zamora et al. 2016

Type strain
- CCUG 60109, CECT 7796, strain 983-08

Species of bacterium

Flavobacterium collinsii is a species of gram-negative bacterium from the genus of Flavobacterium.
