= Flavobacterium filum =

Scientific classification
- Domain: Bacteria
- Kingdom: Pseudomonadati
- Phylum: Bacteroidota
- Class: Flavobacteriia
- Order: Flavobacteriales
- Family: Flavobacteriaceae
- Genus: Flavobacterium
- Species: F. filum

Binomial name
- Flavobacterium filum Ryu et al. 2007

Type strain
- CIP 109743, DSM 17961, EMB34, KCTC 12610, LMG 24723

Species of bacterium

Flavobacterium filum is a Gram-negative and non-motile bacterium from the genus of Flavobacterium which has been isolated from activated sludge from a wastewater treatment plant from Pohang in Korea.
