= Flavobacterium daejeonense =

Scientific classification
- Domain: Bacteria
- Kingdom: Pseudomonadati
- Phylum: Bacteroidota
- Class: Flavobacteriia
- Order: Flavobacteriales
- Family: Flavobacteriaceae
- Genus: Flavobacterium
- Species: F. daejeonense

Binomial name
- Flavobacterium daejeonense Kim et al. 2006

Type strain
- DSM 17708, GH1-10, LB-W, KACC 11422

Species of bacterium

Flavobacterium daejeonense is a Gram-negative and rod-shaped bacterium from the genus of Flavobacterium which has been isolated from greenhouse soil from Daejeon in Korea.
