= Flavobacterium chilense =

Scientific classification
- Domain: Bacteria
- Kingdom: Pseudomonadati
- Phylum: Bacteroidota
- Class: Flavobacteriia
- Order: Flavobacteriales
- Family: Flavobacteriaceae
- Genus: Flavobacterium
- Species: F. chilense

Binomial name
- Flavobacterium chilense Kämpfer et al. 2012

Type strain
- CCM 7940, LM-09-Fp, LMG 26360

Species of bacterium

Flavobacterium chilense is a Gram-negative and non-endospore-forming bacterium from the genus of Flavobacterium which has been isolated from an external lesion from a rainbow trout (Oncorhynchus mykiss) from a fish farm in Chile.
