= Flavobacterium psychrophilum =

Scientific classification
- Domain: Bacteria
- Kingdom: Pseudomonadati
- Phylum: Bacteroidota
- Class: Flavobacteriia
- Order: Flavobacteriales
- Family: Flavobacteriaceae
- Genus: Flavobacterium
- Species: F. psychrophilum

Binomial name
- Flavobacterium psychrophilum (Bernardet and Grimont 1989) Bernardet et al. 1996

Species of bacterium

Flavobacterium psychrophilum is a psychrophilic, gram-negative bacterial rod (3–5 μm in length), belonging to the Bacteroidota. It is the causative agent of bacterial coldwater disease (BCWD) and was first isolated in 1948 during a die-off in the salmonid Oncorhynchus kisutch.

== Characteristics ==
Flavobacterium psychrophilum is a gram-negative bacteria ranging from 0.75–1.0 μm wide and 3–5 μm long. It is found in cold, fresh waters with an optimal growth temperature below 16 °C (61 °F). When grown on Cytophaga Agar, F. psychrophilum produces bright yellow colonies with thin spreading margins not greater than 3 mm in diameter. Motility is achieved by gliding, movement that does not involve the use of pili or flagella. The bacterium is positive for gelatin hydrolysis, albumin digestion, tributyrin digestion, tributyrin hydrolysis, E. coli cell autolysis, and casein hydrolysis. On its fish host, the pathogen can be found on external and internal sites, such as skin/mucus, gills, brain, ascites, lesions, mucus, kidney, spleen, and reproductive excretions of spawning adults. Colonization is evident by faint, white areas on the host.

== Metabolism ==
Flavobacterium psychrophilum has a strictly aerobic metabolism, but is unable to use carbohydrates as a source of carbon and energy. Instead, it relies on peptides for carbon and energy. Secreted proteases result in a mixture of amino acids and oligopeptides that comprise the main source of carbon, nitrogen, and energy. Peptidases degrade imported peptides to amino acids, which are then processed by amino acids catabolic pathways. The degradation of lipids to fatty acids is achieved by a phospholipase and three enzymes of the esterase-lipase-thioesterase family. Beta-oxidation of fatty acids is performed by a long-chain fatty acid-CoA ligase, three fatty acid dehydrogenases, a crotonase and three thiolases. Most of the degradation products of host proteins and lipids by the F. psychrophilum are available as citric acid cycle precursors.

== Phylogeny ==
Because of its yellow pigmentation, Flavobacterium psychrophilum was originally believed to be a myxobacterium. However, its inability to produce fruiting bodies or degrade complex polysaccharides led to this classification being considered inappropriate and it was then suggested to belong within the genus Flexibacter. However, the low G+C composition of the DNA of F. psychrophilum was inconsistent with the high G+C content of Flexibacter species. Its DNA G+C demonstrated that it was more closely associated with those of Flavobacterium species. Analysis of the 16S rRNA gene indicated that F. psychrophilum, F. columnare, and F. maritimus were closely related and probably shared a common descent.

== Genome ==
The genome of flavobacterium psychrophilum consists of a circular chromosome of 2,861,988 bp, which is predicted to contain 2,432 protein-coding genes. Compared to environmental members of the family, it has a small genome, probably related to its restricted ecological niche. The genome encodes 13 assumed secreted proteases that are involved in virulence and destruction of the host's tissues. Also, the genome encodes for bacterial hemolysins that cooperate with proteases for tissue destruction and thiol-activated cytolysins, like proteins, that are responsible for host tissue damage.

The genome of the organism encodes for an extensive aerobic respiratory chain. Genome analysis revealed that sugar kinase and phosphotransferase systems used by bacteria for specific carbohydrate uptake are absent. However, genes encoding for enzymes for the glycolytic pathway and the pentose phosphate pathway are present in its genome. These two pathways are therefore involved in precursor metabolites. Gene FP1110 and FP1111 encode for cyanophycinase, and cyanophycin synthetase may serve as a storage compound for carbon, nitrogen, and energy, allowing the organism to survive in low-nutrient conditions.

== Bacterial coldwater disease (BCWD) ==
Flavobacterium psychrophilum is the causative agent of bacterial cold water disease (BCWD). Affected fish first display a whitish discoloration along the exterior side of the adipose fin, then eventually progresses to invest the entire caudal peduncle. Infection can occur horizontally, between fish via waterborne and contact exposure, and vertically, since F. psychrophilum is able to resist lysozyme concentrations greater than those that occur within salmonid eggs. Treatment for BCWD is possible in early stages. Bath treatments with either water-soluble oxytetracycline or quaternary ammonium compounds are recommended, but such treatments are ineffective once the erosion of the peduncle and caudal fin becomes evident. In Europe, treatment with the use of oxytetracycline, amoxicillin, and florfenicol has been successful, with little antibiotic resistance forming in the bacteria. Currently, there are no commercially licensed vaccines available for use against this pathogen.
