= Flavobacterium frigidarium =

Scientific classification
- Domain: Bacteria
- Kingdom: Pseudomonadati
- Phylum: Bacteroidota
- Class: Flavobacteriia
- Order: Flavobacteriales
- Family: Flavobacteriaceae
- Genus: Flavobacterium
- Species: F. frigidarium

Binomial name
- Flavobacterium frigidarium Humphry et al. 2001

Species of bacterium

Flavobacterium frigidarium is a bacterium. It is an aerobic, psychrophilic, xylanolytic and laminarinolytic bacterium from Antarctica. It is gram-negative, non-motile and yellow-pigmented. Its type strain is A2i^{T} (= ATCC 700810^{T} = NCIMB 13737^{T}).
