= Flavobacterium degerlachei =

Scientific classification
- Domain: Bacteria
- Kingdom: Pseudomonadati
- Phylum: Bacteroidota
- Class: Flavobacteriia
- Order: Flavobacteriales
- Family: Flavobacteriaceae
- Genus: Flavobacterium
- Species: F. degerlachei

Binomial name
- Flavobacterium degerlachei Van Trappen et al. 2004

Type strain
- AC 23, CIP 108386, DSM 15718, LMG 21915, NBRC 102677, R-9106

Species of bacterium

Flavobacterium degerlachei is a Gram-negative, rod-shaped and psychrophilic bacterium from the genus of Flavobacterium which has been isolated from microbial mat from the Lake Ace in the Antarctica.
