= Flavobacterium arcticum =

Scientific classification
- Domain: Bacteria
- Kingdom: Pseudomonadati
- Phylum: Bacteroidota
- Class: Flavobacteriia
- Order: Flavobacteriales
- Family: Flavobacteriaceae
- Genus: Flavobacterium
- Species: F. arcticum

Binomial name
- Flavobacterium arcticum Li et al. 2017

Type strain
- SM1502T

Species of bacterium

Flavobacterium arcticum is a Gram-negative, aerobic and rod-shaped bacterium from the genus of Flavobacterium which has been isolated from seawater from the Arctic.
