= Flavobacterium flabelliforme =

Scientific classification
- Domain: Bacteria
- Kingdom: Pseudomonadati
- Phylum: Bacteroidota
- Class: Flavobacteriia
- Order: Flavobacteriales
- Family: Flavobacteriaceae
- Genus: Flavobacterium
- Species: F. flabelliforme

Binomial name
- Flavobacterium flabelliforme Králová et al. 2021

Species of bacterium

Flavobacterium flabelliforme is a species of Gram-negative, psychrotolerant bacterium. It has been found in an abandoned bird nest on James Ross Island in Antarctica. The bacterium's specific epithet is derived from the Latin flabellum, meaning fan, in reference to how its colonies are shaped like fans.

== Description ==
Cells of F. flabelliforme are Gram-negative, rod-shaped bacteria approximately 0.4–0.6 μm wide and 1.2–2.4 μm long. The species does not form endospores or capsules and exhibits gliding motility.

Cells occur singly, in pairs, or in irregular clusters. Colonies are yellow-pigmented on standard bacteriological media.

F. flabelliforme is catalase- and oxidase-positive and grows at temperatures ranging from 1 °C to 30 °C, with optimal growth near 20 °C. Growth occurs between pH 6 and 9, with an optimum near neutral pH. Sodium chloride is not required for growth, and higher salinity inhibits growth. The species grows under aerobic and microaerophilic conditions but shows limited anaerobic growth.

== Habitat and ecology ==
F. flabelliforme was isolated from an abandoned bird nest on James Ross Island in Antarctica. This environment is characterized by low temperatures, high ultraviolet radiation, and limited nutrient availability.

Members of the genus Flavobacterium are commonly found in soil, freshwater, marine environments, and polar ecosystems, where they contribute to the degradation of organic matter. Unlike some members of the genus that are pathogenic to fish, F. flabelliforme has not been associated with disease.

== Genetic and physiological features ==
Genome analysis of the type strain of F. flabelliforme revealed the presence of genes associated with cold adaptation. These included cold-shock proteins, oxidative stress response systems, and carotenoid biosynthesis pathways.

Phenotypic testing and genomic analysis indicate a multidrug-resistant profile, although typical antibiotic resistance genes are not consistently detected by standard prediction tools.

The bacterium's genome also contains multiple prophage regions and several biosynthetic gene clusters of unknown function, suggesting potential for the production of novel bioactive compounds.

== Taxonomy and etymology ==
Flavobacterium flabelliforme was proposed as a novel species by Králová and colleagues in 2021 following a polyphasic taxonomic analysis of Antarctic isolates within the genus Flavobacterium.

== See also ==
- Flavobacteriia
- Antarctic microbiology
