= Flavobacterium cucumis =

Scientific classification
- Domain: Bacteria
- Kingdom: Pseudomonadati
- Phylum: Bacteroidota
- Class: Flavobacteriia
- Order: Flavobacteriales
- Family: Flavobacteriaceae
- Genus: Flavobacterium
- Species: F. cucumis

Binomial name
- Flavobacterium cucumis Weon et al. 2007

Type strain
- CIP 109888, DSM 18830, KACC 11732, R-2 A45-3

Synonyms
- Flavobacterium sangjuense

Species of bacterium

Flavobacterium cucumis is a Gram-negative, rod-shaped and aerobic bacterium from the genus of Flavobacterium which has been isolated from greenhouse soil which was cultivated with cucumbers from Sangju in Korea.
