= Myroides xuanwuensis =

Scientific classification
- Domain: Bacteria
- Kingdom: Pseudomonadati
- Phylum: Bacteroidota
- Class: Flavobacteriia
- Order: Flavobacteriales
- Family: Flavobacteriaceae
- Genus: Myroides
- Species: M. xuanwuensis

Binomial name
- Myroides xuanwuensis Zhang et al. 2014

Type strain
- TH-19

Bacterium

Myroides xuanwuensis is a Gram-negative, aerobic, rod-shaped and non-motile bacterium from the genus of Myroides which has been isolated from forest soil from Jiangsu.
