= Flavobacterium aquaticum =

Scientific classification
- Domain: Bacteria
- Kingdom: Pseudomonadati
- Phylum: Bacteroidota
- Class: Flavobacteriia
- Order: Flavobacteriales
- Family: Flavobacteriaceae
- Genus: Flavobacterium
- Species: F. aquaticum

Binomial name
- Flavobacterium aquaticum Subhash et al. 2013

Type strain
- CGMCC 1.12398, JC164, KCTC 32196, LMG 27251

Species of bacterium

Flavobacterium aquaticum is a Gram-negative bacterium from the genus of Flavobacterium which has been isolated from water from a rice field from Jamdih in India.
