= Flavobacterium banpakuense =

Scientific classification
- Domain: Bacteria
- Kingdom: Pseudomonadati
- Phylum: Bacteroidota
- Class: Flavobacteriia
- Order: Flavobacteriales
- Family: Flavobacteriaceae
- Genus: Flavobacterium
- Species: F. banpakuense

Binomial name
- Flavobacterium banpakuense Kim et al. 2011

Type strain
- JCM 16466, KACC 14225, 15F3

Species of bacterium

Flavobacterium banpakuense is a Gram-negative, strictly aerobic, non-spore-forming and motile bacterium from the genus of Flavobacterium which has been isolated from compost.
