= Flavobacterium flaviflagrans =

Scientific classification
- Domain: Bacteria
- Kingdom: Pseudomonadati
- Phylum: Bacteroidota
- Class: Flavobacteriia
- Order: Flavobacteriales
- Family: Flavobacteriaceae
- Genus: Flavobacterium
- Species: F. flaviflagrans

Binomial name
- Flavobacterium flaviflagrans Dahal et al. 2017

Type strain
- KACC 19112, KEMB 9005-535, NBRC 112704, strain CB-3

Species of bacterium

Flavobacterium flaviflagrans is a Gram-negative, aerobic, non-spore-forming, rod-shaped and non-motile bacterium from the genus of Flavobacterium which has been isolated from forest soil near the Kyonggi University in Korea.
