= Flavobacterium antarcticum =

Scientific classification
- Domain: Bacteria
- Kingdom: Pseudomonadati
- Phylum: Bacteroidota
- Class: Flavobacteriia
- Order: Flavobacteriales
- Family: Flavobacteriaceae
- Genus: Flavobacterium
- Species: F. antarcticum

Binomial name
- Flavobacterium antarcticum Yi et al. 2005

Type strain
- DSM 19726, AT1026, IMSNU 14042, JCM 12383, KCTC 12222

Species of bacterium

Flavobacterium antarcticum is a Gram-negative, aerobic and psychrotolerant bacterium from the genus of Flavobacterium which has been isolated from soil from a penguin habitat from King George Island in Antarctica.
