= Myroides phaeus =

Scientific classification
- Domain: Bacteria
- Kingdom: Pseudomonadati
- Phylum: Bacteroidota
- Class: Flavobacteriia
- Order: Flavobacteriales
- Family: Flavobacteriaceae
- Genus: Myroides
- Species: M. phaeus

Binomial name
- Myroides phaeus Yan et al. 2012

Type strain
- MY15

Bacterium

Myroides phaeus is a bacterium from the genus of Myroides which has been isolated from human saliva.
