= Flavobacterium araucananum =

Scientific classification
- Domain: Bacteria
- Kingdom: Pseudomonadati
- Phylum: Bacteroidota
- Class: Flavobacteriia
- Order: Flavobacteriales
- Family: Flavobacteriaceae
- Genus: Flavobacterium
- Species: F. araucananum

Binomial name
- Flavobacterium araucananum Kämpfer et al. 2012

Type strain
- CCM 7939, LM-19-Fp, LMG 26359

Species of bacterium

Flavobacterium araucananum is a Gram-negative and non-spore-forming bacterium from the genus of Flavobacterium which has been isolated from a kidney of an ill salmon (Salmo salar) from a fish farm in Concepción in Chile.
