= Flavobacterium beibuense =

Scientific classification
- Domain: Bacteria
- Kingdom: Pseudomonadati
- Phylum: Bacteroidota
- Class: Flavobacteriia
- Order: Flavobacteriales
- Family: Flavobacteriaceae
- Genus: Flavobacterium
- Species: F. beibuense

Binomial name
- Flavobacterium beibuense Kim et al. 2011

Type strain
- CCTCC AB 209067, F44-8, LMG 25233, MCCC 1A02877

Synonyms
- Flavobacterium beibugulfensis

Species of bacterium

Flavobacterium beibuense is a bacterium from the genus of Flavobacterium which has been isolated from sediments from the Beibu Gulf in China.
