= Flavobacterium aquicola =

Scientific classification
- Domain: Bacteria
- Kingdom: Pseudomonadati
- Phylum: Bacteroidota
- Class: Flavobacteriia
- Order: Flavobacteriales
- Family: Flavobacteriaceae
- Genus: Flavobacterium
- Species: F. aquicola

Binomial name
- Flavobacterium aquicola Hatayama et al. 2016

Type strain
- DSM 100880, TMd3a3, JCM 30987

Species of bacterium

Flavobacterium aquicola is a Gram-negative, facultatively anaerobic and non-spore-forming bacterium from the genus of Flavobacterium which has been isolated from water from the Tamagawa River in Atsugi in Japan.
