= Flavobacterium defluvii =

Scientific classification
- Domain: Bacteria
- Kingdom: Pseudomonadati
- Phylum: Bacteroidota
- Class: Flavobacteriia
- Order: Flavobacteriales
- Family: Flavobacteriaceae
- Genus: Flavobacterium
- Species: F. defluvii

Binomial name
- Flavobacterium defluvii Park et al. 2007

Type strain
- CIP 109898, DSM 17963, EMB117, KCTC 12612

Species of bacterium

Flavobacterium defluvii is a Gram-negative and non-spore-forming bacterium from the genus of Flavobacterium which has been isolated from activated sludge from a municipal wastewater treatment plant in Pohang in Korea.
