= Flavobacterium endophyticum =

Scientific classification
- Domain: Bacteria
- Kingdom: Pseudomonadati
- Phylum: Bacteroidota
- Class: Flavobacteriia
- Order: Flavobacteriales
- Family: Flavobacteriaceae
- Genus: Flavobacterium
- Species: F. endophyticum

Binomial name
- Flavobacterium endophyticum Gao et al. 2015

Type strain
- ACCC 19708, DSM 29537, strain 522

Species of bacterium

Flavobacterium endophyticum is a Gram-negative, aerobic and rod-shaped bacterium from the genus of Flavobacterium which has been isolated from the tissue of a maize plant from Beijing in China.
