= Flavobacterium algicola =

Scientific classification
- Domain: Bacteria
- Kingdom: Pseudomonadati
- Phylum: Bacteroidota
- Class: Flavobacteriia
- Order: Flavobacteriales
- Family: Flavobacteriaceae
- Genus: Flavobacterium
- Species: F. algicola

Binomial name
- Flavobacterium algicola Miyashita et al. 2010

Type strain
- CIP 109574, TC2, NBRC 102673

Species of bacterium

Flavobacterium algicola is a Gram-negative, rod-shaped, aerobic and non-motile bacterium from the genus of Flavobacterium which has been isolated from a marine algae from the Sea of Okhotsk near Japan.
