= Flavobacterium chungangense =

Scientific classification
- Domain: Bacteria
- Kingdom: Pseudomonadati
- Phylum: Bacteroidota
- Class: Flavobacteriia
- Order: Flavobacteriales
- Family: Flavobacteriaceae
- Genus: Flavobacterium
- Species: F. chungangense

Binomial name
- Flavobacterium chungangense Kim et al. 2009

Type strain
- JCM 15651, KACC 13353, strain CJ7

Species of bacterium

Flavobacterium chungangense is a Gram-negative, rod-shaped and aerobic bacterium from the genus of Flavobacterium which has been isolated from a freshwater lake from the Chung-Ang University in Anseong in Korea.
