= Flavobacterium cheniae =

Scientific classification
- Domain: Bacteria
- Kingdom: Pseudomonadati
- Phylum: Bacteroidota
- Class: Flavobacteriia
- Order: Flavobacteriales
- Family: Flavobacteriaceae
- Genus: Flavobacterium
- Species: F. cheniae

Binomial name
- Flavobacterium cheniae Qu et al. 2008

Type strain
- CGMCC 1.6844, Nj-26, NBRC 103934

Species of bacterium

Flavobacterium cheniae is a Gram-negative and rod-shaped bacterium from the genus of Flavobacterium which has been isolated from sediments from the Guanting Reservoir from Beijing in China.
