= Flavobacterium denitrificans =

Scientific classification
- Domain: Bacteria
- Kingdom: Pseudomonadati
- Phylum: Bacteroidota
- Class: Flavobacteriia
- Order: Flavobacteriales
- Family: Flavobacteriaceae
- Genus: Flavobacterium
- Species: F. denitrificans

Binomial name
- Flavobacterium denitrificans Horn et al. 2005

Species of bacterium

Flavobacterium denitrificans is a species of N_{2}O-producing facultative aerobic bacteria first isolated from the gut of the earthworm Aporrectodea caliginosa. Cells are Gram-negative, motile, and rod-shaped. The type strain of the species is ED5^{T} (=DSM 15936^{T} =ATCC BAA-842^{T}).
