= Myroides injenensis =

Scientific classification
- Domain: Bacteria
- Kingdom: Pseudomonadati
- Phylum: Bacteroidota
- Class: Flavobacteriia
- Order: Flavobacteriales
- Family: Flavobacteriaceae
- Genus: Myroides
- Species: M. injenensis

Binomial name
- Myroides injenensis Paek et al. 2015

Synonyms
- Myroides injenesis

Species of bacterium

Myroides injenensis is a Gram-negative and rod-shaped bacterium from the genus of Myroides which has been isolated from human urine.

== Future reading ==
- LaVergne, Stephanie; Gaufin, Thaidra; Richman, Douglas (1 July 2019). "Myroides injenensis Bacteremia and Severe Cellulitis". Open Forum Infectious Diseases. 6 (7) ofz282. doi:10.1093/ofid/ofz282. PMC 6634436. PMID 31334299.
