= Flavobacterium cauense =

Scientific classification
- Domain: Bacteria
- Kingdom: Pseudomonadati
- Phylum: Bacteroidota
- Class: Flavobacteriia
- Order: Flavobacteriales
- Family: Flavobacteriaceae
- Genus: Flavobacterium
- Species: F. cauense

Binomial name
- Flavobacterium cauense Qu et al. 2009

Type strain
- CGMCC 1.7270, NBRC 104929, R2A-7

Species of bacterium

Flavobacterium cauense is a Gram-negative and rod-shaped bacterium from the genus of Flavobacterium which has been isolated from sediments of the Taihu Lake in China. Colonies of Flavobacterium cauense on R2a agar have been reported to be yellowish orange.
