= Flavobacterium arsenitoxidans =

Scientific classification
- Domain: Bacteria
- Kingdom: Pseudomonadati
- Phylum: Bacteroidota
- Class: Flavobacteriia
- Order: Flavobacteriales
- Family: Flavobacteriaceae
- Genus: Flavobacterium
- Species: F. arsenitoxidans

Binomial name
- Flavobacterium arsenitoxidans Khianngam et al. 2015

Type strain
- S2-3H, KCTC 22507, NBRC 109607, PCU 331, TISTR 2238

Species of bacterium

Flavobacterium arsenitoxidans is a Gram-negative, arsenite-oxidizing, non-spore-forming, rod-shaped and aerobic bacterium from the genus of Flavobacterium which has been isolated from soil from Suphanburi in Thailand.
