= Flavobacterium cutihirudinis =

Scientific classification
- Domain: Bacteria
- Kingdom: Pseudomonadati
- Phylum: Bacteroidota
- Class: Flavobacteriia
- Order: Flavobacteriales
- Family: Flavobacteriaceae
- Genus: Flavobacterium
- Species: F. cutihirudinis

Binomial name
- Flavobacterium cutihirudinis Glaeser et al. 2013

Type strain
- CIP 110374, CIP 110384, DSM 25795, E89 T, LMG 26922

Species of bacterium

Flavobacterium cutihirudinis is a Gram-negative bacterium from the genus of Flavobacterium which has been isolated from the skin of a leech Hirudo verbana from Biebertal in Germany.
