= Flavobacterium arsenatis =

Scientific classification
- Domain: Bacteria
- Kingdom: Pseudomonadati
- Phylum: Bacteroidota
- Class: Flavobacteriia
- Order: Flavobacteriales
- Family: Flavobacteriaceae
- Genus: Flavobacterium
- Species: F. arsenatis

Binomial name
- Flavobacterium arsenatis Ao et al. 2014

Type strain
- CCTCC AB 2013048, KCTC 32397, strain Z

Species of bacterium

Flavobacterium arsenatis is an arsenic-resistant, Gram-negative and rod-shaped bacterium from the genus of Flavobacterium which has been isolated from high-arsenic sediments from Jianghan Plain in China.
