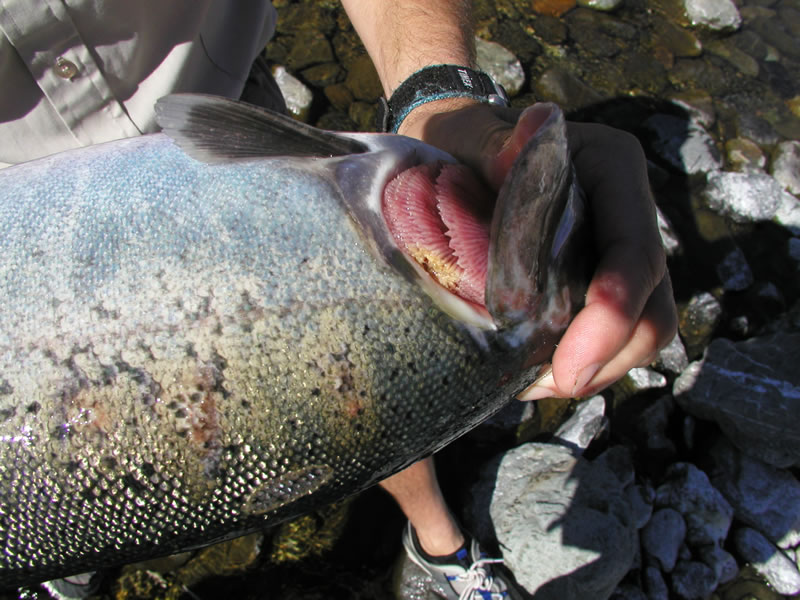
- Columnaris disease (Flavobacterium columnare) in the gill of a chinook salmon

Scientific classification
- Domain: Bacteria
- Kingdom: Pseudomonadati
- Phylum: Bacteroidota
- Class: Flavobacteriia
- Order: Flavobacteriales
- Family: Flavobacteriaceae
- Genus: Flavobacterium; Bergey et al. 1923 (Approved Lists 1980)

Species
- See text

= Flavobacterium =

Genus of bacteria

Flavobacterium is a genus of Gram-negative, nonmotile and motile, rod-shaped bacteria that consists of 130 recognized species. Flavobacteria are found in soil and fresh water in a variety of environments. Several species are known to cause disease in freshwater fish.

Flavobacterium psychrophilum causes the bacterial cold water disease on salmonids and the rainbow trout fry disease on rainbow trout. F. columnare causes the cotton-wool disease on freshwater fishes. F. branchiophilum causes the bacterial gill disease on trout. Another member of this genus, F. okeanokoites is the original source for the type IIs restriction endonuclease FokI, used in Zinc finger nucleases and TALENs.

Species who are a part of the genus Flavobacterium are most likely found scattered along in nature. These microbes are mostly found in aquatic ecosystems and wet areas with freshwater or seawater.

== Species ==
The genus Flavobacterium comprises the following species:

F. acidificum
F. aciduliphilum
F. acidurans
F. agri
F. agrisoli
F. ahnfeltiae
F. ajazii
F. album
F. algicola
F. alkalisoli
F. ammonificans
F. ammoniigenes
F. amnicola
F. amnigenum
F. anatoliense
F. anhuiense
F. antarcticum
F. aquaticum
F. akiainvivens
F. aquariorum
F. aquatile
F. aquicola
F. aquidurense
F. aquimarinum
F. araucananum
F. arcticum
F. arsenatis
F. arsenitoxidans
F. aurantiibacter
F. aureus
F. banpakuense
F. baculatum
F. beibuense
F. bernardetii
F. bizetiae
F. bomense
F. bomensis
F. branchiarum
F. branchiicola
F. branchiophilum
F. breve
F. brevivitae
F. buctense
F. caeni
F. caseinilyticum
F. cauense
F. cellulosilyticum
F. ceti
F. cerinum
F. cheniae
F. cheongpyeongense
F. cheonanense
F. cheonhonense
F. chilense
F. chryseum
F. chungangense
F. chungbukense
F. chungnamense
F. circumlabens
F. collinsense
F. collinsii
F. columnare
F. compostarboris
F. commune
F. coralii
F. covae
F. crassostreae
F. croceum
F. crocinum
F. cucumis
F. cupreum
F. cutihirudinis
F. cyanobacteriorum
F. daejeonense
F. daemonensis
F. dankookense
F. dasani
F. dauae
F. davisii
F. defluvii
F. degerlache
F. denitrificans
F. devorans
F. difficile
F. dispersum
F. dongtanense
F. eburneum
F. endophyticum
F. endoglycinae
F. enshiense
F. faecale
F. ferrugineum
F. filum
F. flabelliforme
F. flaviflagrans
F. flevense
F. fluviale
F. fluviatile
F. fluvii
F. fontis
F. franklandianum
F. frigidarium
F. frigidimaris
F frigoris
F. fryxellicola
F. fulvum
F. gawalongense
F. gelidilacus
F. geliluteum
F. gillisiae
F. ginsengisoli
F. ginsenosidimutans
F. glaciei
F. glycines
F. granuli
F. halmophilum
F. hankyongi
F. haoranii
F. hauense
F. hercynium
F. hibernum
F. hiemivividum
F. humi
F. humicola
F. hydatis
F. hydrocarbonoxydans
F. hydrophilum
F. ichthyis
F. indicum
F. inkyongense
F. inviolabile
F. jejuense
F. jocheonensis
F. johnsoniae
F. jumunjinense
F. kingsejongi
F. knui
F. koreense
F. kyungheense
F. lacicola
F. lacunae
F. lacus
F. laiguense
F. limicola
F. limnosediminis
F. lindanitolerans
F. longum
F. lotistagni
F. luticocti
F. lutivivi
F. macrobrachii
F. magnum
F. maotaiense
F. marinum
F. maris
F.microcysteis
F. micromati
F. mizutaii
F. muglaense
F. myungsuense
F. multivorum
F. nackdongense
F. naphthae
F. nitratireducens
F. nitrogenifigens
F. niveum
F. noncentrifugens
F. notoginsengisoli
F. oceanosedimentum
F. omnivorum
F. oncorhynchi
F. okeanokoites
F. orientale
F. oreochromis
F. oryzae
F. panici
F. palustre
F. paronense
F. parvum
F. pectinovorum
F. pedocola
F. petrolei
F. phocarum
F. phragmitis
F. phycosphaerae
F. piscinae
F. piscis
F. plurextorum
F. pokkalii
F. ponti
F. procerum
F. profundi
F. psychrolimnae
F. psychrophilum
F. psychroterrae
F. psychrotolerans
F. qiangtangense
F. rakeshii
F. ranwuense
F. reichenbachii
F. resistens
F restrictum
F. rhamnosiphilum
F. riviphilum
F. rivuli
F. rivulicola
F. saccharophilum
F. saliperosum
F. salilacus
F. salmonis
F. sandaracinum
F. sangjuense
F. sasangense
F. segetis
F. sediminilitoris
F. sediminis
F. selenitireducens
F. seoulense
F. sharifuzzamanii
F. silvaticum
F. silvisoli
F. sinopsychrotolerans
F. soli
F. solisilvae
F. spartansii
F. squillarum
F. stagni
F. suaedae
F. subsaxonicum
F. succinans
F. suncheonense
F. supellecticarium
F. suzhouense
F. swingsii
F. tagetis
F. tangerina
F. tangerinum
F. tegetincola
F. terrae
F. terrigena
F. terriphilum
F. thermophilum
F. tiangeerense
F. tibetense
F. tilapiae
F. tistrianum
F. tructae
F. tyrosinilyticum
F. ummariense
F. undicola
F. ureilyticum
F. urocaniciphilum
F. urumqiense
F. verecundum
F. vireti
F. viscosum
F. weaverense
F. xanthum
F. xinjiangense
F. xueshanense
F. yanchengense
F. yonginense
F. zaozhuangense
F. zepuense
F. zettnowii
F. zhairuonense
F. zhairuonensis
