= Disulfoglucosamine-6-sulfatase =

Class of enzymes

disulfoglucosamine-6-sulfatase

Identifiers
- EC no.: 3.1.6.11
- CAS no.: 37288-32-7

Databases
- BRENDA: enzyme data
- ExPASy: NiceZyme view
- KEGG: enzyme entry
- MetaCyc: metabolic pathway
- Rhea: reactions
- PDB structures: RCSB PDB PDBe PDBsum
- Gene Ontology: AmiGO / QuickGO
Search
- PMC: articles
- PubMed: articles
- NCBI: proteins

The enzyme disulfoglucosamine-6-sulfatase (EC 3.1.6.1) catalyzes the reaction

2-N,6-O-disulfo-D-glucosamine)
H_{2}O
H_{2}SO_{4}
N-sulfo-D-glucosamine

The enzyme characterised from Flavobacterium heparinum hydrolyses 2-N,6-O-disulfo-D-glucosamine (shown in its open-chain aldehydo form) to 2-N-sulfo-D-glucosamine and sulfate. The reaction is part of the breakdown of heparin.

This enzyme is a hydrolase, specifically one acting on sulfuric ester bonds. The systematic name is 2-N,6-O-disulfo-D-glucosamine 6-sulfohydrolase. Other names in common use include N-sulfoglucosamine-6-sulfatase, and 6,N-disulfoglucosamine 6-O-sulfohydrolase.
