= Ichthyobacterium =

Scientific classification
- Domain: Bacteria
- Kingdom: Pseudomonadati
- Phylum: Bacteroidota
- Class: Flavobacteriia
- Order: Flavobacteriales
- Family: Ichthyobacteriaceae; Takano et al. 2016
- Genus: Ichthyobacterium; Takano et al. 2016
- Species: I. seriolicida

Binomial name
- Ichthyobacterium seriolicida Takano et al. 2016

Type strain
- ATCC BAA-2465; JBKA-6; JJCM 18228

Species of bacteria

Ichthyobacterium seriolicida is a species of gram-negative bacteria that was isolated from a diseased yellowtail fish (Seriola quinqueradiata). It is the only species in the genus Ichthyobacterium and family Ichthyobacteriaceae. The species is slightly halophilic, with an optimal salinity concentration of 1.7% under laboratory conditions.
