= Myroides =

Scientific classification
- Domain: Bacteria
- Kingdom: Pseudomonadati
- Phylum: Bacteroidota
- Class: Flavobacteriia
- Order: Flavobacteriales
- Family: Flavobacteriaceae
- Genus: Myroides; Vancanneyt et al. 1996

Type species
- Myroides odoratus

Species
- M. guanonis M. injenensis M. marinus M. odoratimimus M. odoratus M. pelagicus M. phaeus M. profundi M. xuanwuensis

Genus of bacteria

Myroides is a bacterial genus from the family of Flavobacteriaceae. Some Myroides species such as Myroides odoratimimus can cause infections in humans.
