= Bacterial cold water disease =

Bacterial disease of salmonid fish

Bacterial cold water disease (BCWD) is a bacterial disease of freshwater fish, specifically salmonid fish. It is caused by the bacterium Flavobacterium psychrophilum (previously classified in the genus Cytophaga), a psychrophilic, gram-negative rod-shaped bacterium of the family Flavobacteriaceae. This bacterium is found in fresh waters with the optimal growth temperature below 13 °C, and it can be seen in any area with water temperatures consistently below 15 °C. Salmon are the most commonly affected species. This disease is not zoonotic.

Asymptomatic carrier fish and contaminated water provide reservoirs for disease. Transmission is mainly via horizontal transmission, but vertical transmission can also occur.

BCWD may be referred to by a number of other names including cold water disease, peduncle disease, fit rot, tail rot and rainbow trout fry mortality syndrome.

== Causes and symptoms ==
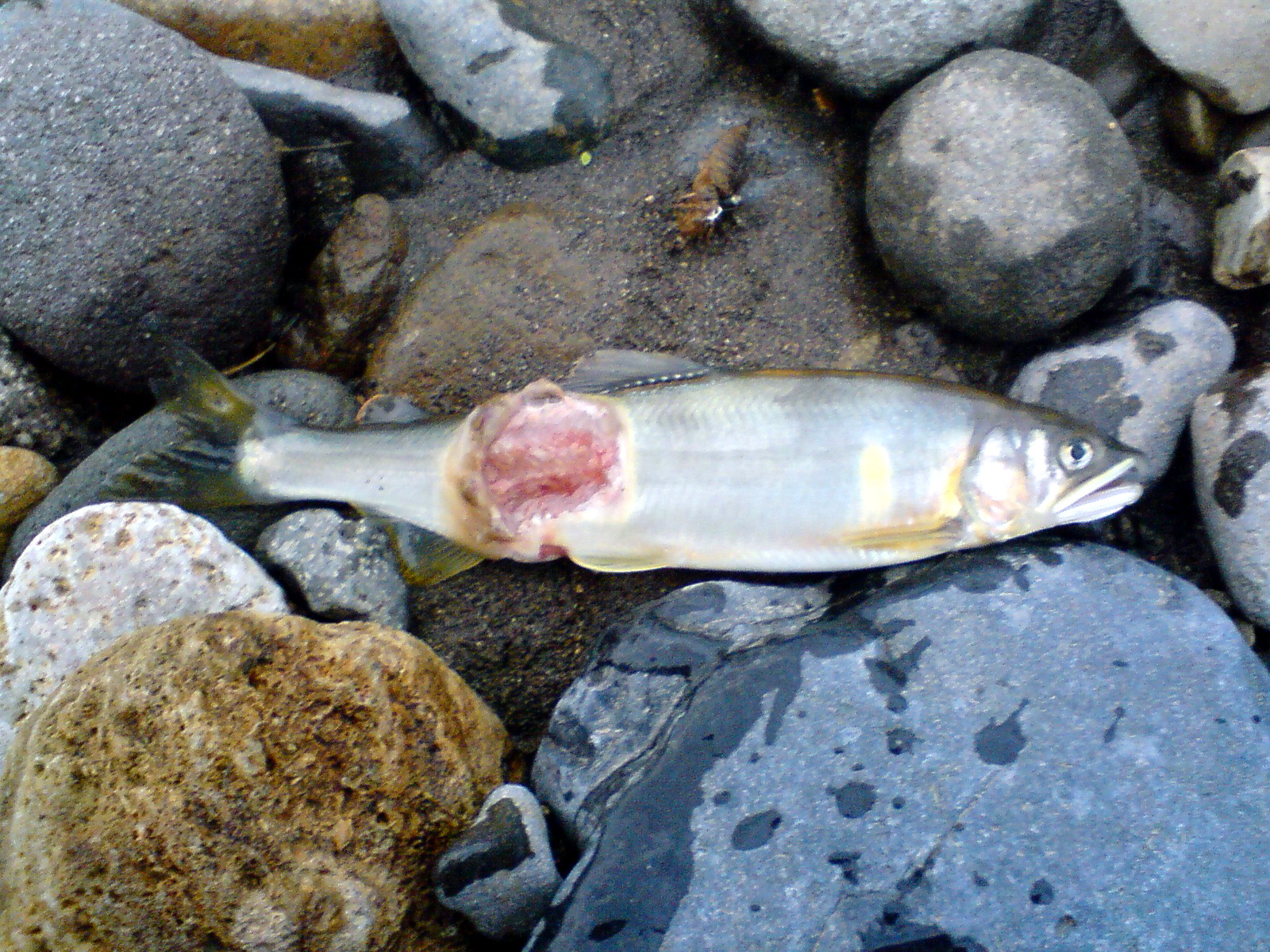
An ayu sweetfish infected with cold water disease

Fish infected with the pathogen Flavobacterium psychrophilum experience tissue erosion, jaw ulcerations, inflammation, and behavioral issues. Fins may appear dark, torn, split, ragged, frayed and may even be lost completely. Symptoms begin with tissue erosion, especially on the caudal fin. Other symptoms include the skin of the jaw "ulcerations", pale in color gills, increased mucus production, blindness, inflammation of the gastrointestinal system, and behavioral issues such as "spiral swimming". Affected fish are often lethargic and stop feeding. Infection may spread systemically. Salmonid fish can also get a chronic form of BCWD following recovery from typical BCWD. It is characterized by erratic "corkscrew" swimming, blackened tails and spinal deformities.

In rainbow trout fry syndrome, acute disease with high mortality rates occurs. Infected fish may show signs of lethargy, inappetence and exophthalmos before death.

A presumptive diagnosis can be made based on the history, clinical signs, pattern of mortality and water temperature, especially if there is a history of the disease in the area. The organism can be cultured for definitive diagnosis. Alternatively, histology should show periostitis, osteitis, meningitis and ganglioneuritis.

== Transmission ==
This bacterium was first reported in 1922 at the Fisheries Biological station in Fairport, Iowa and it has undergone many taxonomic revisions since then. The primary site of transmission is via fish to fish contact, particularly within the gills and the fins. Although horizontal transmission is the most common way for bacterial growth to occur, there is evidence that vertical transmission may also play a role in transmission.

== Prevention and treatment ==
Quaternary ammonium compounds can be added to the water of infected adult fish and fry. Alternatively, the antibiotic oxytetracycline can be given to adults, fry and broodstock.

To prevent the disease, it is necessary to ensure water is pathogen-free and that water hardening is completed effectively for eggs. Stress and damage to skin are two factors that are able to cause an increase in disease progression, so minimizing these two factors can prevent the bacteria from multiplying. In addition, removing the diseased fish from the area is important in reducing the chances of spreading the bacteria within the environment. In addition, producing UV light Iodophor disinfection of eggs just before hatching has been recorded as a sensible way of minimizing egg-associated transmission risks. The presence of the bacteria has been seen in fluid of the surrounding eggs in sexually mature salmonids. Using iodophor treatment is a way of reducing microbial contamination of the egg surface.

If the disease is caught at an early stage, diagnosing BCWD accurately by a veterinarian is important for not only the fish's existence, but its environment as well.

== See also ==
- Flavobacteria
- Flavobacterium
