= Bacterial gill disease =

Bacterial disease of fish

Bacterial gill disease (BGD) is an infectious disease of fish characterized by bacterial overgrowth of the gills, resulting in respiratory impairment and gill tissue damage. The disease is most commonly caused by bacteria from the genus Flavobacterium. Bacterial gill disease has worldwide distribution, but is most commonly associated with freshwater aquaculture systems.

== Cause ==
Bacterial gill disease is most frequently associated with filamentous bacteria from the genus Flavobacterium, particularly Flavobacterium branchiophilum. Unlike several other pathogenic flavobacteria, F. branchiophilum has strong tropism for gill tissue and is rarely recovered from internal organs.

== Pathogenesis ==
Flavobacterium branchiophilum colonizes the surface of the gill epithelium and forms dense mats of bacteria on gill filaments and lamellae. Attachment of the bacterium stimulates epithelial cell hyperplasia and increased mucus production. The thickened epithelial layer can lead to reduced gas exchange.

== Signs and symptoms ==
Clinical signs of bacterial gill disease include lethargy, loss of appetite, and sluggish response to external stimuli. Fish often gather at the top of the water column and may appear to be gasping for air. Infected fish may also orient upstream to increase water flow over the respiratory surfaces of the gills.

The gill filaments of fish infected with BGD appear gray and swollen. Depending on the level of swelling, the gills may be unable to close fully.

Wet mounts of gill tissue often show clubbing of gill filaments, lamellar fusion, and excess mucus. Large numbers of filamentous bacteria adhering to the gills are also present. Histological exmaination shows proliferation of epithelial cells with lamellar fusion. Necrosis of gill tissue is infrequently observed. This contrasts columnaris, a bacterial disease of the gills which frequently causes extensive necrosis and erosion of gill tissue.

== Diagnosis ==
Diagnosis of bacterial gill disease is based on clinical signs and examination of the gills. Bacterial culture is not routinely performed due to the slow-growing nature of the bacterium and high mortality of the disease.

Faster alternative diagnostic assays are currently being investigated. A PCR assay targeting 16S rDNA has been developed to selectively identify F. branchiophilum, with minimal cross-reactivity from similar bacterial fish pathogens.

== Treatment ==
Submerging afflicted fish in hydrogen peroxide baths has been shown to be an effective treatment method in experimentally infected rainbow trout (Oncorhynchus mykiss).

== Economic importance ==
Bacterial gill disease is considered one of the most significant bacterial diseases affecting hatchery-reared salmonids. Outbreaks are most common in the spring and early summer, when water temperatures are higher and hatcheries have the largest amount of young fish.

Mortality rates vary considerably among outbreaks and is influenced by numerous factors. Severe outbreaks in juvenile fish have been reported to cause daily mortality rates of 20-50% when left untreated.

Bacterial gill disease appears to be largely restricted to farmed fish and outbreaks do not appear to occur in wild populations.
