= Crocinitomicaceae =

Scientific classification
- Domain: Bacteria
- Kingdom: Pseudomonadati
- Phylum: Bacteroidota
- Class: Flavobacteriia
- Order: Flavobacteriales
- Family: Crocinitomicaceae; Munoz et al. 2016

Genera
- Brumimicrobium Bowman et al. 2003; Crocinitomix Bowman et al. 2003; Fluviicola O'Sullivan et al. 2005; Lishizhenia Lau et al. 2006; Putridiphycobacter Wang et al. 2020; Salinirepens Muramatsu et al. 2012; Wandonia Lee et al. 2010

Family of bacteria

Crocinitomicaceae is a family of gram-negative bacteria in the order Flavobacteriales.
