= Schleiferiaceae =

Scientific classification
- Domain: Bacteria
- Kingdom: Pseudomonadati
- Phylum: Bacteroidota
- Class: Flavobacteriia
- Order: Flavobacteriales
- Family: Schleiferiaceae; Albuquerque et al. 2011

Genera
- Croceimicrobium Liu et al. 2021; Owenweeksia Lau et al. 2005; Schleiferia Albuquerque et al. 2011; Thermaurantimonas Iino et al. 2020

Family of bacteria

Schleiferiaceae is a family of bacteria in the order Flavobacteriales.
