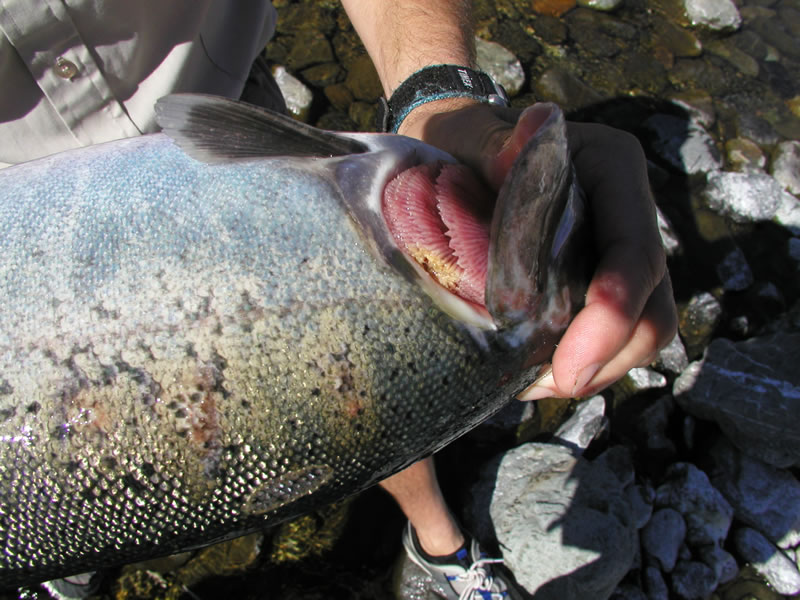
- Flavobacterium columnare in the gills of a Chinook salmon

Scientific classification
- Domain: Bacteria
- Kingdom: Pseudomonadati
- Phylum: Bacteroidota
- Class: Flavobacteriia
- Order: Flavobacteriales
- Family: Flavobacteriaceae
- Genus: Flavobacterium
- Species: F. columnare

Binomial name
- Flavobacterium columnare (Bernardet and Grimont 1989) Bernardet et al. 1996

= Flavobacterium columnare =

Species of bacterium

Flavobacterium columnare is a thin Gram-negative rod bacterium of the genus Flavobacterium. The name derives from the way in which the organism grows in rhizoid columnar formations.

The species was first described by Davis (1922), and the name was validated by Bernardet and Grimont (1989).

Flavobacterium columnare can be identified in the laboratory by a five-step method that demonstrates:

1. the ability to grow on a medium containing neomycin and polymyxin B
2. production of yellow pigmented rhizoid (root-like in appearance) colonies
3. production of a gelatin-degrading enzyme
4. binding of Congo red dye to the colony
5. production of a chondroitin sulfate-degrading enzyme

The species has been known previously as Flexibacter columnaris, Bacillus columnaris, and Cytophaga columnaris.

Flavobacterium columnare is one of the oldest known diseases among warm-water fish, and manifests itself as an infection commonly known as columnaris. Infections are the second leading cause of mortality in pond raised catfish in the southeastern United States. Early treatment with potassium permanganate has been shown to increase survival rate, although the difference was not statistically significant.
