= Cryomorphaceae =

Scientific classification
- Domain: Bacteria
- Kingdom: Pseudomonadati
- Phylum: Bacteroidota
- Class: Flavobacteriia
- Order: Flavobacteriales
- Family: Cryomorphaceae; Bowman et al. 2003

Genera
- "Candidatus Abditibacter" Grieb et al. 2020; Acidiluteibacter Gui et al. 2020; Cryomorpha Bowman et al. 2003; Luteibaculum Shahina et al. 2013; Phaeocystidibacter Zhou et al. 2013; Salibacter Lu et al. 2017; Vicingus Wiese et al. 2018

Synonyms
- Vicingaceae Bowman 2021; Luteibaculaceae Bowman 2021; Salibacteraceae Bowman 2021

Family of bacteria

Cryomorphaceae is a family of gram-negative bacteria in the order Flavobacteriales which occur in marine habitats.
