= Columnaris =

Bacterial infection of fish

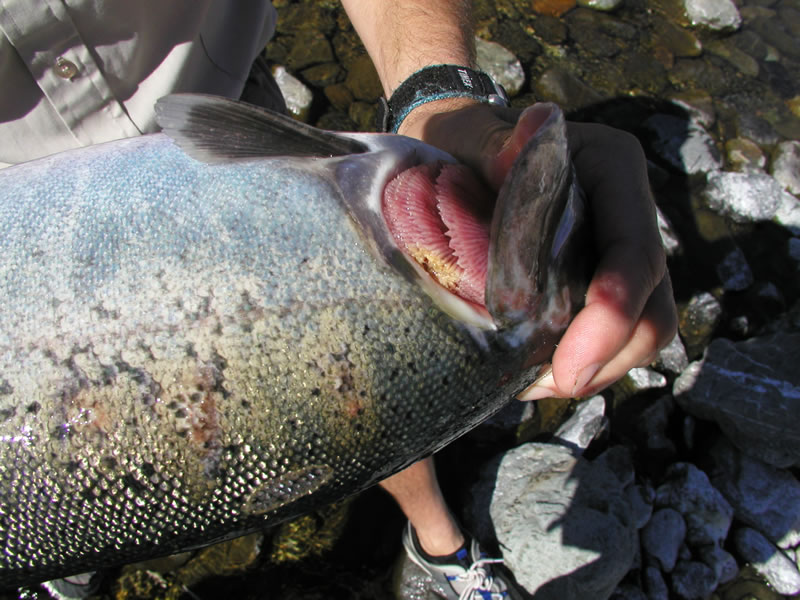
Columnaris in a Chinook salmon

Columnaris (also referred to as cottonmouth and saddle-back disease) is a disease in fish which results from an infection caused by the Gram-negative, aerobic, rod-shaped bacterium Flavobacterium columnare. It was previously known as Bacillus columnaris, Chondrococcus columnaris, Cytophaga columnaris and Flexibacter columnaris. The bacteria are ubiquitous in fresh water, and cultured fish reared in ponds or raceways are the primary concern – with disease most prevalent in air temperatures above 12–14 °C. Due to the appearance of bacterial clumps, it can be mistaken for a fungal infection. The disease is highly contagious, and the outcome is commonly fatal. It is not zoonotic.

== Causes ==
Columnaris disease occurs in both wild and farmed freshwater fish and is caused by the bacteria F. columnare. The age of an infected fish impacts the course of the infection. The bacteria usually enter fish through gills, mouth, or small wounds, and is prevalent where high bioloads exist, or where conditions may be stressful due to overcrowding or low dissolved oxygen levels in the water column. The bacteria can persist in water for up to 32 days when the hardness is 50 ppm or more. Minerals are however essential for fish and the reduction or removal of such minerals in treatment for Columnaris would affect fish mineral uptake and thus affect: oxygen utilization, osmotic regulation, metabolic processes, among may other biological processes and poor minerals (GH) may be a contributing cause to the advancement in severity of this disease, as deficits can increase vulnerability to opportunistic infections.

== Symptoms ==
Columnaris disease can occur in both acute and chronic cases. In acute cases of columnaris, the disease may progress so quickly that it shows no superficial signs at death. Signs of acute disease may manifest in the form of shortness of breath, gill discolouration, and itching as indicated by flashing, quick movements of a fish rubbing skin against other surfaces. Columnaris disease in young fish is acute and damages the gills, leading to death by respiratory distress. In chronic cases, fin rot, or frayed and ragged fins, can appear. Lesions begin at the base of the dorsal fin on the back of a fish and spread over time, hence the name saddleback disease. Ulcerations on the skin, and subsequent epidermal loss, identifiable as white or cloudy, fungus-like patches – particularly on the gill filaments, may appear. Mucus also accumulates on the gills, head and dorsal regions. Gills will change colour, either becoming light or dark brown, and may also manifest necrosis. Fish will breathe rapidly and laboriously as a sign of gill damage. Anorexia and lethargy are common, as are mortalities, especially in young fish.

== Diagnosis ==
Definitive diagnosis is usually made from bacteria isolated from gills or skin cultured using low nutrient growth media kept between 25 and 30 °C. Inhibiting contaminant growth on the agar by adding antibiotics should improve culture results. Colonies are small, 3–4 mm in diameter, and grow within 24 hours. They are characteristically rhizoid in structure and pale yellow in colour.

== Prevention ==
A live attenuated vaccine against columnaris disease exists for catfish.

== Treatment ==
Tetracyclines and quinolines are used in treatment for columnaris disease. A medicated fish bath (ideally using aquarium merbromin, alternately methylene blue, or potassium permanganate and salt), is generally a first step, as well lowering the aquarium temperature to 75 °F (24 °C) is a must, since columnaris is much more virulent at higher temperatures, especially 85–90 °F.

Medicated food containing oxytetracycline is also an effective treatment for internal infections, but resistance is emerging. Potassium permanganate, copper sulfate, and hydrogen peroxide can also be applied externally to adult fish and fry, but can be toxic at high concentrations. Vaccines can also be given in the face of an outbreak or to prevent disease occurrence.

== Prognosis ==
Early detection of the disease is vital to reducing spread and financial loss to fish farmers. Ulcerations develop within 24 to 48 hours. Fatality occurs between 48 and 72 hours if no treatment is pursued; however, at higher temperatures death may occur within hours.

== History ==
In 1922, columnaris disease was first described by Herbert Spencer Davis in the U.S. Bureau of Fisheries Bulletin, where he stated the bacteria responsible for the disease should be called Bacillus columnaris due to its shape. He was unsuccessful in culturing the disease artificially but acknowledged that "Bacillus columnaris is widely distributed over the country" being most deadly during warm weather and to fish already injured in some way. EJ Ordal and Rucker isolated the first culture in 1944, identified it as a slime bacterium, and named it Chondrococcus columnaris. Laura Garnjobst evaluated the bacterium to be Cytophaga columnaris in a 1945 article due to its behaviour. After further research in 1989 on DNA and phenotypes, Jean-Francois Bernardet and Patrick A. D. Grimont reclassified the bacterium Flexibacter columnaris. After further study led by Bernardet in 1996, the name was changed to Flavobacterium columnare.
