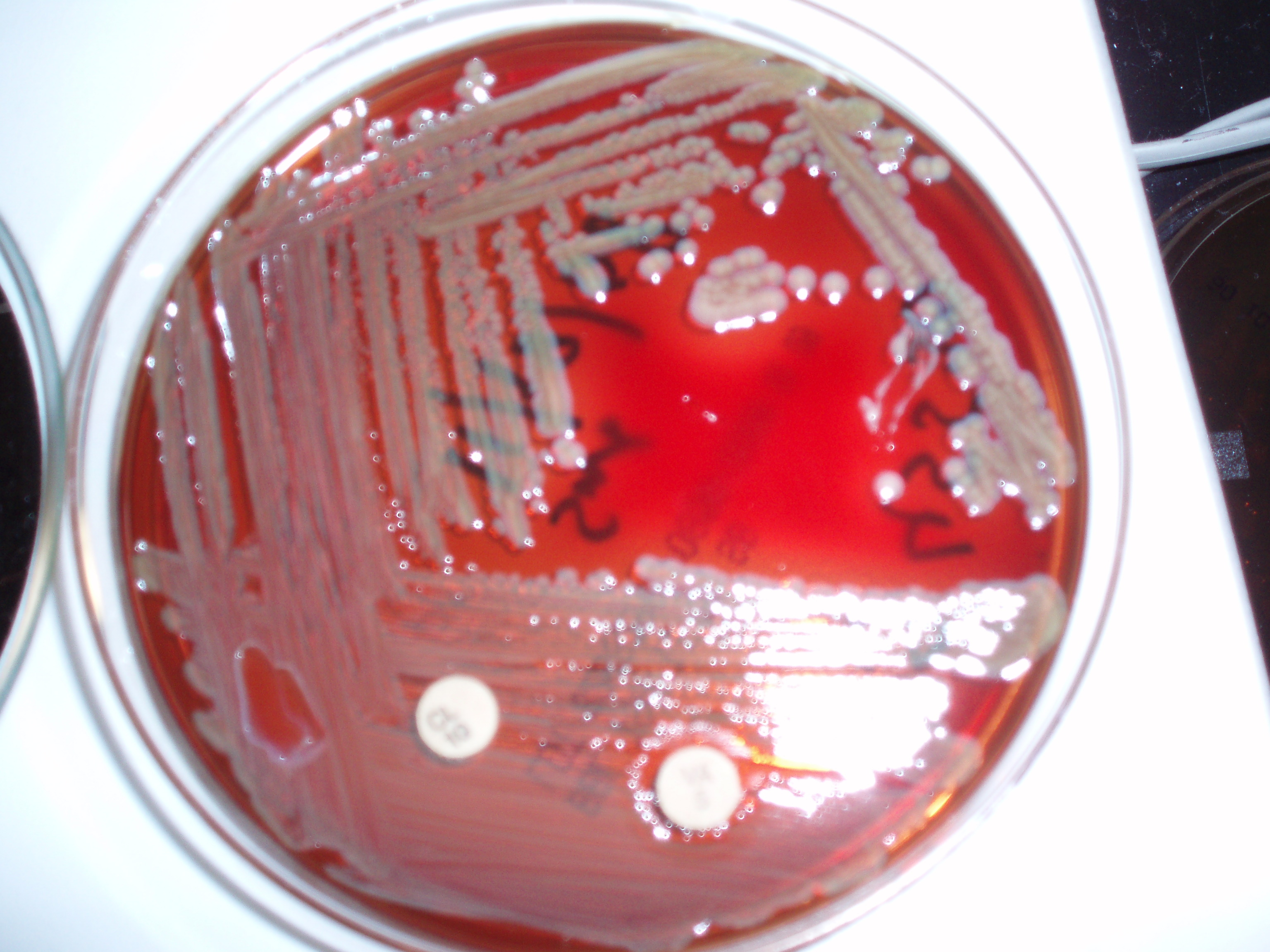
- Elizabethkingia meningoseptica on blood agar

Scientific classification
- Domain: Bacteria
- Kingdom: Pseudomonadati
- Phylum: Bacteroidota
- Class: Flavobacteriia; Bernardet 2012

Orders
- Flavobacteriales Bernardet 2012; Genera not assigned to an order or family; "Candidatus Walczuchella monophlebidarum" Rosas-Perez et al. 2014

= Flavobacteriia =

Class of bacteria

The class Flavobacteriia is composed of a single class of environmental bacteria. It contains the family Flavobacteriaceae, which is the largest family in the phylum Bacteroidota. This class is widely distributed in soil, fresh, and seawater habitats. The name is often spelt Flavobacteria, but was officially named Flavobacteriia in 2012.

Flavobacteriia are gram-negative aerobic rods, 2–5 μm long, 0.1–0.5 μm wide, with rounded or tapered ends. They form circular cream to orange coloured colonies on agar, and are typically simple to successfully culture. Flavobacteriia is a chemoorganotroph and are known for their ability to mineralize or degrade dissolved organic matter of high molecular weight and particulate plant material.

Flavobacteriia have impacts on both the environment and human society, as they are able to cause diseases in many organisms. They are important in the decomposition of organic matter and pollutants, and are key members in the formation of marine biofilms. They also have been known to cause diseases in some animal species, specifically bacterial cold water disease and columnaris disease.

== Taxonomy ==
Flavobacteriia is the largest of the four classes of phylum Bacteroidota. It is a single-order class, and its largest family is Flavobacteriaceae. Flavobacteriaceae is the largest family in the phylum Bacteroidota. The family has over 90 genera and hundreds of species. The genus Flavobacterium is most commonly used in studies of Flavobacteriia. This genus has 100 classified species with many additional unclassified species. Recent taxonomic updates have reclassified several Flavobacterium species to new genera such as Microbacterium, Salegentibacter, and Planococcus.

- Domain Bacteria
  - Phylum Bacteroidota
    - Class Flavobacteriia
      - Order Flavobacteriales
        - Family Crocinitomicaceae
        - Family Cryomorphaceae
        - Family Flavobacteriaceae
          - Genus Flavobacterium
          - Genera Microbacterium, Salegentibacter, and Planococcus.
        - Family Ichthyobacteriaceae
        - Family Luteibaculaceae
        - Family Parvicellaceae
        - Family Salibacteraceae
        - Family Schleiferiaceae
        - Family Vicingaceae
        - Family Weeksellaceae
        - Family Flavobacteriales incertae sedis
        - Additionally, unclassified Flavobacteriales

== History ==
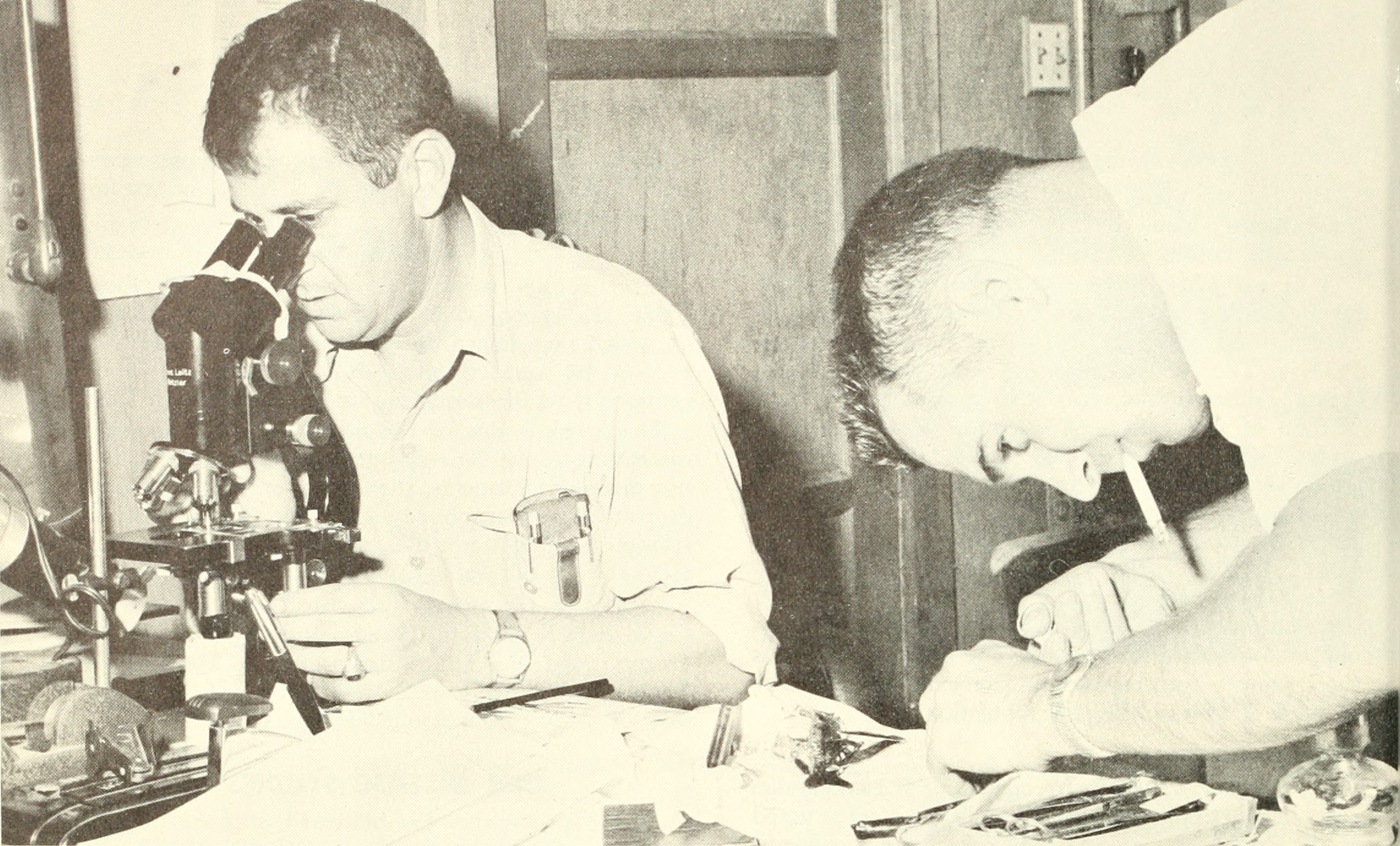
Department disease laboratory researchers (Harold Wolf and Bill Schafer) investigate a trout disease threat in a commercial hatchery.

The genus Flavobacterium was established in 1889. It was first written about in 1923 in Bergey's manual of determinative bacteriology and contained one of the first of 46 discussed species. The manual defines Flavobacteriia as gram-negative, non-spore-forming, aerobic, non-gliding rods. In 1999, Flavobacteriia was discovered to have a yellow pigment in colonies. It was also identified that they move through gliding and only grow in the presence of oxygen.

In 1922, Flavobacterium columnare, an agent of columnaris disease with significant effects on fish, was discovered in the Mississippi River, making it one of the earliest known diseases of its kind. The disease was originally labelled as a Myxobacteria in 1944, but was renamed to Flavobacterium columnare in 1996 with 10 species. Flavobacteriia used to contain many non-related species of yellow, rod-shaped bacteria, but taxonomy has changed and stabilized due to the sequencing of rRNA to deduce phylogenetic relationships.

In 1978, Bacterial Gill Disease was officially discovered to be linked to a specific bacterium. In 1989 studies were conducted using isolates from fish in the United States, Japan and Hungary. In 1985 it finally achieved the name of Flavobacterium branchiophila. In 1990 Flavobacterium branchiophilum was officially recognized as the correct and current nomenclature.

== Habitat ==
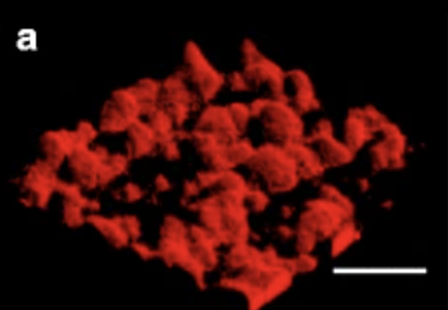
Flavobacteriia forming mudflat biofilms, as shown through confocal laser scanning microscopy in a 3D view. Growth took place over 24 hours on glass surfaces under dynamic conditions and stained with Syto 61 red. Scale bar: 67.3μm.

Flavobacteriia are widely distributed with high abundances in aquatic systems. They have been found in diseased fish, microbial mats, freshwater and river sediments, seawater and marine sediments, soil, glaciers, and Antarctic lakes. Increases in abundance are found in areas of high organic substrate inputs due to their role in the uptake, degradation, and decomposition of organic matter and can result in bacterial dominance. Flavobacteriia is prominent in ocean sediments and decreases with increasing depth, and prefer sediments lacking vegetation.

These bacteria also are highly abundant in melt ponds, solid ice cores, sea ice, and brine, as well as the photic zone. More specifically, these photic zones show that Flavobacteriia are prominent in productive environments such as phytoplankton blooms and upwelling zones. Flavobacteriia are prominent members of marine biofilms. They have large impacts on the functioning of marine biofilms, however their abundance is believed to be heavily underestimated.

Flavobacteriia can also be found in non-marine systems and are most common in Asian regions, specifically Korea and China, as well as Japan and India.

== Morphology ==
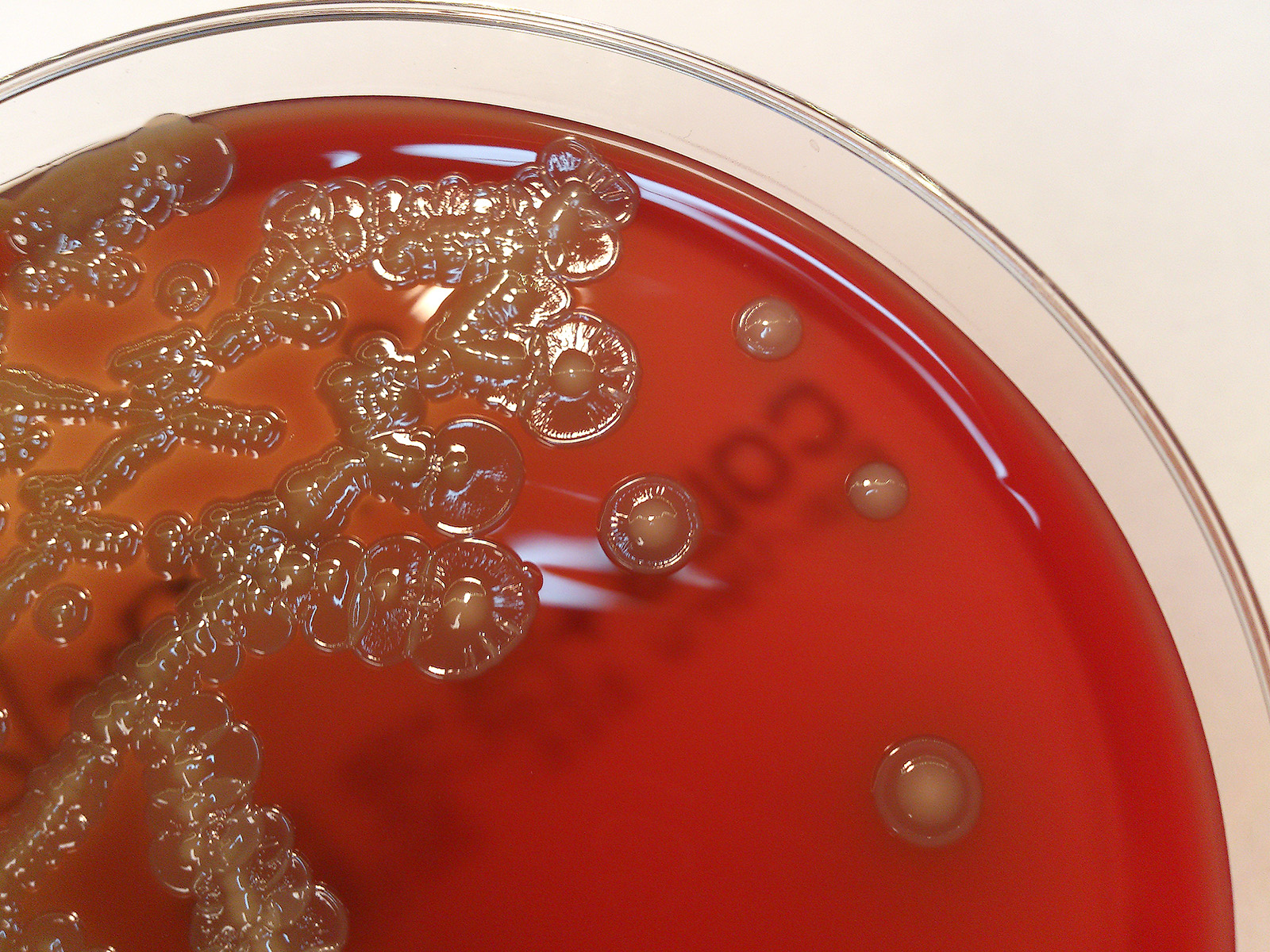
Colony morphology of Flavobacteriia species Bergeyella zoohelcum on blood agar

Flavobacteriia are a type of gram-negative rod-shaped bacteria with sizes typically ranging from 0.1μm to 0.5μm wide and 2μm to 5μm long. Depending on the species of Flavobacteriia, the genome size can range from 1.85 billion daltons to 3.9 billion daltons. Flavobacteriia are also unable to form endospores. They are classified as gram-negative due to the composition of their cell wall, which consists of a thin layer of peptidoglycan surrounded by an outer membrane composed of lipopolysaccharides. The rod-shape of these bacteria typically have straight or slightly curved parallel sides with rounded or slightly tapered ends. The overall colony morphology of Flavobacteriia exhibit a circular shape that is either convex or slightly convex with a smooth appearance. These colonies typically appear slightly translucent and can range in colour from pale yellow/cream to orange due to the presence of pigments such as carotenoids or flexirubin.

Flavobacteriia do not possess flagella and rely on either a gliding motion or are non-motile. The gliding motion allows them to move over wet surfaces such as a wet mount glass slide or agar plate. Flavobacteriia exhibit a predominant forward gliding motion, but can also reverse direction and show flipping movements . Research suggests that the gliding motion is facilitated by the proton gradient across the cytoplasmic membrane.

== Metabolism ==
Bacteria from the class Flavobacteriia have diverse metabolism. Flavobacteriia are chemoorganotrophic, meaning they use organic molecules as a source of energy. Most species have obligately aerobic type of respiration, while some species can grow under weak microaerobic to anaerobic conditions. Some species of Flavobacteriia have the ability to use a broad range of carbohydrates as energy sources, while others have a limited capacity or none at all, and instead prefer to utilize amino acids and proteins. Approximately half of the species belonging to Flavobacteriia are capable of breaking down carbohydrates into acid and can degrade tyrosine and tween compounds. Only a few species can degrade urea and DNA. Many species also play a significant role in the mineralization of organic matter in both aquatic and soil environments due to their capability of breaking down various types of biomacromolecules.

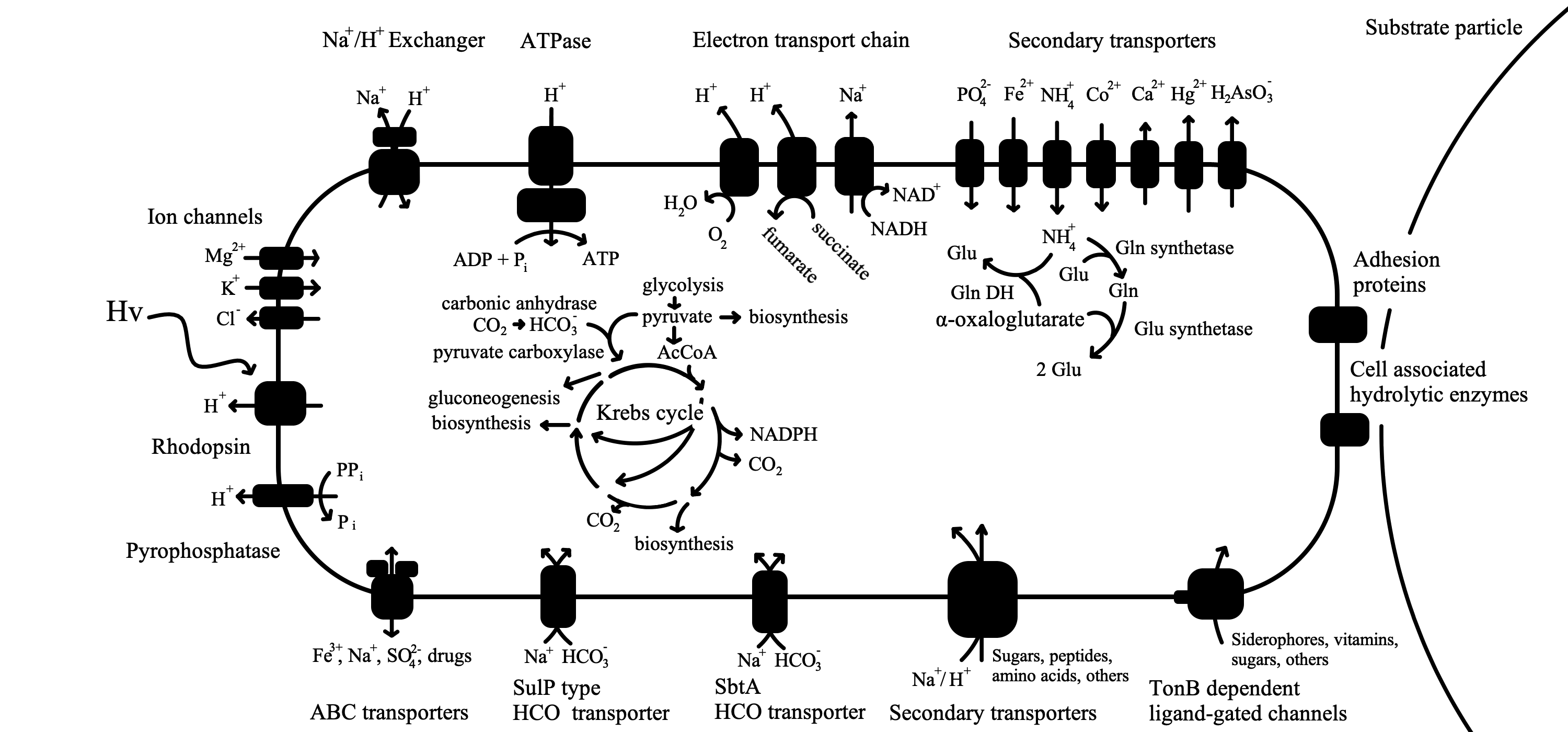
Diagram of bacterial cell with transporters. Genome analysis of proteorhodopsin in Flavobacteriia.

Flavobacteriia are not photosynthetic, but some marine species use proteorhodopsin for energy through the harvesting of light. Proteorhodopsin (PR) is a proton pump that uses light, however species who use PR need to adapt to different environments to combat ultraviolet (UV) damage, and adopt the ability to mend DNA that has been damaged by UV.

Proteorhodopsin is useful in the active transport of protons across the cell membrane. This is useful in the creation of ATP as energy in Flavobacteriia. The diagram to the right shows how proteorhodopsin is used in Flavobacteriia cells, and provides specifics about how it used in the bacteria.

== Culture ==
Typical culturing methods are used to isolate Flavobacteriia, such as simple dilutions. Techniques vary by species due to the high diversity of the class, however many are cultivated on simple media using yeast extract and a protein hydrolysate. Sugars may need to be added or certain salts for marine species. Fish and bird pathogens may have additional requirements for culture methodology.

Marine Flavobacteriia are cultured on marine agar or cytophaga agar. Non-marine Flavobacteriia are culture on rich media including nutrient agar, casitone-yeast extract agar, PYG agar, and TYES agar, or nutrient-poor media such as AO agar, PY2 agar, and R2A agar. Flavobacteriia species that inhabit cold environments exhibit optimal growth at temperatures between 15 °C to 20 °C, while those that inhabit temperate environments exhibit optimal growth at temperatures between 20 °C to 30 °C. Therefore, temperatures for culturing are between 20 °C and 30 °C, with an optimal temperature of 37˚C.

Many psychrophilic and psychrotrophic species have been isolated through culture methods, mainly from polar regions. Additional mesophilic species have been isolated as well as a few thermophiles, while extreme halophiles have not yet been identified.

== Environmental impact ==
Though the majority of Flavobacteriia are harmless, some infect opportunistically or cause severe diseases. This means that they can cause disease in many types organisms such as plants or fish. They have proteins that discharge factors able to cause the development of a disease. Fish pathogens are common on or in fish or the surrounding water. Bird pathogens cause outbreaks in domestic poultry or wild birds.

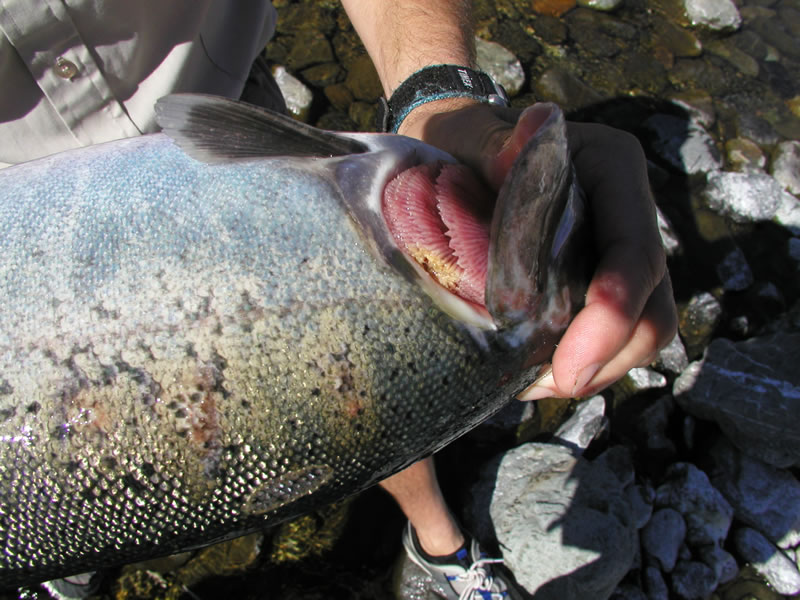
Columnaris disease (Flavobacterium columnaris) in the gill of a chinook salmon.

One possible disease is bacterial cold water disease caused by Flavobacterium psychrophilum in rainbow trout, which can cause tissue erosion, jaw ulcerations, inflammation, and behavioural issues. It can also cause acute losses in young rainbow trout, known as rainbow trout fry syndrome. In 2005, the National Center for Cool and Cold Water Aquaculture measured survival rate to be 29.3% from these diseases.

Additionally, Flavobacterium columare causes columnaris disease in freshwater fish species. Columnaris disease causes skin lesions, fin erosion, and gill necrosis, leading to mortality.

Marine biofilms are a biological element that significantly affects the productivity and operation of marine habitats by assisting in basic microbial processes like photosynthesis, the cycling of nitrogen, and the degradation of organic matter and pollutants. In the early stage of marine biofilms formation, Flavobacteriia colonize and form microcolonies to serve as a foundation for establishing other microorganisms in a community. In the biofilms community, Flavobacteriia also engage in a variety of cooperated interactions with other microbes rather than competition, including quorum sensing, nutrient sharing and scavenging. In sum, these interactions are essential for establishing and maintaining complex microbial communities in marine biofilms.

== Human impact ==
=== Food ===
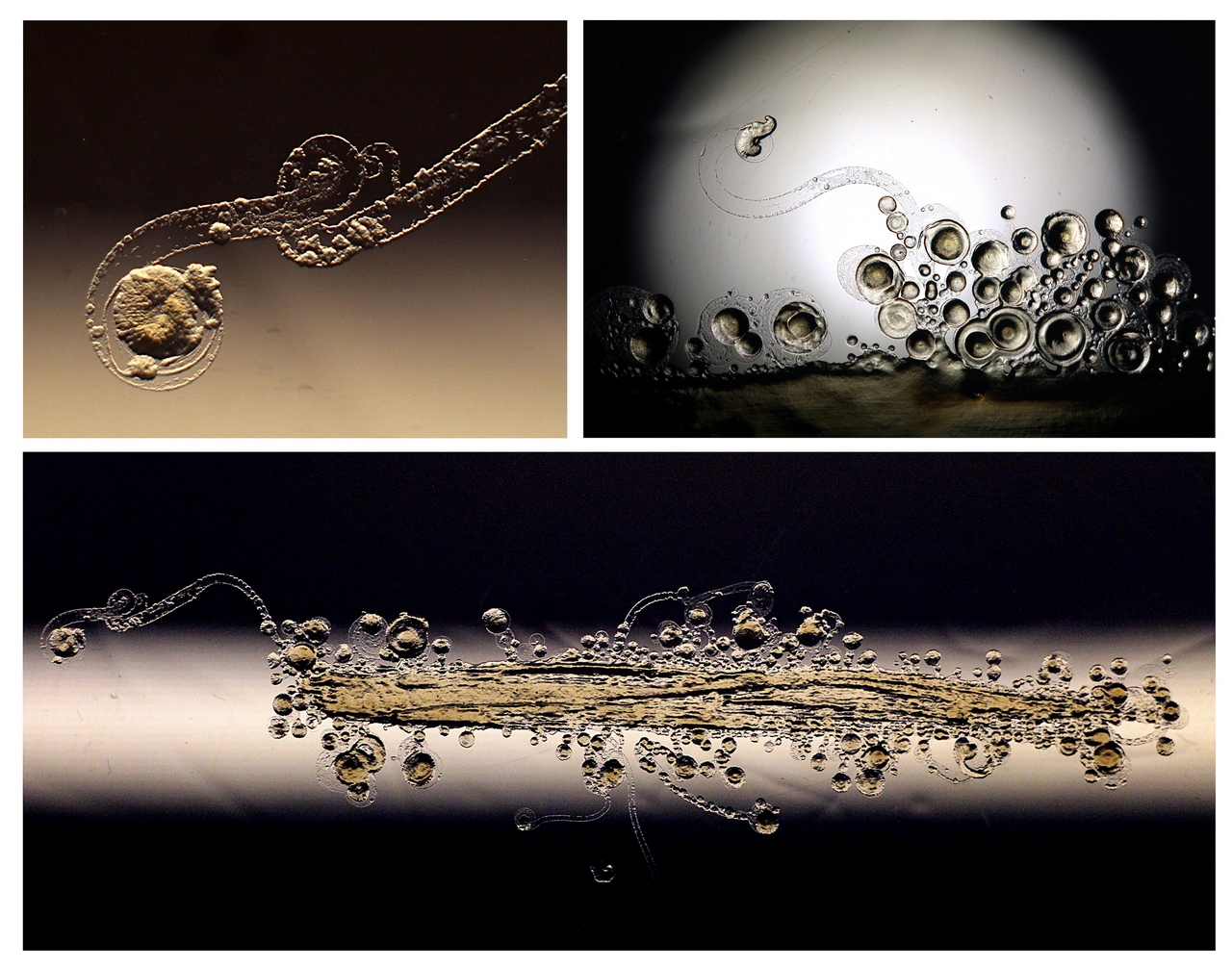
A culture of Cytophaga strains to study enzymes in relation to polysaccharides. Specifically, yeast is used industrial and laboratory processes and Cytophaga enzymes can destroy the yeast cell wall. The culture was obtained using a microbiological loop to streak on agar nutrient medium.

Flavobacteriia have been linked to food and food product deterioration. The relative humidity of the shop where the product is located affects the growth of psychrophilic or psychrotrophic microorganisms. Due to the formation of metabolic byproducts, spoilage of uncooked red flesh causes unpleasant smells, potential slime production, localised discolouration and unwanted flavours. Similarly, while Flavobacteriia are a continuous component of the initial flora in cold meats and fowl, they are unable to outcompete pseudomonads during preservation. Poultry has a much greater prevalence of flavobacteriia than other fresh flesh.

Flavobacteriia create pasteurisation-resistant extracellular enzymes, which causes the psychrotrophic deterioration of milk and dairy products. Due to the creation of phospholipase C, they are also to blame for a decrease in cheddar cheese output and bitterness in milk. Given that phospholipases have the capacity to degrade the phospholipids that make up the milk fat globule membrane and thereby increase the vulnerability of the milk fat (triglycerides) to lipolytic assault, they may be significant in milk and milk products.

=== Disease ===
Members of the Flavobacteriia also cause disease in humans. However, as strains within the Flavobacterium were reclassified, many strains that cause human disease were transferred to new or different genera such as Chryseobacterium, Myroides, Empedobacter and Sphingobacterium. Their main infected populations are newborns and people with immunodeficiencies. Neonatal infections usually manifest as meningitis, and the mortality rate of neonatal meningitis is high. Meningitis can also cause bacteremia and pneumonia. In adults, infections can manifest in a variety of ways, including pneumonia, sepsis, meningitis, endocarditis, post-surgery, and post-burn. To this point, existing pathogenic Flavobacteriia are currently very rare and difficult to detect, but remain a concern because they are resistant to many antimicrobial drugs.

=== Industrial uses ===
The decomposition abilities of Flavobacteriia are also used to benefit humans industries. The bacteria commonly is found in sewage treatment facilities. They are used to treat wastewater because of their ability to digest chemicals and other molecules, including polycyclic aromatic hydrocarbons.

Flavobacteriia is used to promote plant growth in the agricultural sector. The bacteria is able to solubilise inorganic phosphate and produce additional beneficial elements such as indole-3-acetic acid (the key plant hormone IAA) and 1-aminocyclopropane-1-carboxylatedeaminase (a hydrolase), which can be taken up and used by plants or alter their signalling. It can act as a microbial agent to protect plants from other diseases, and even has benefits in the development of antimicrobial medicines.
