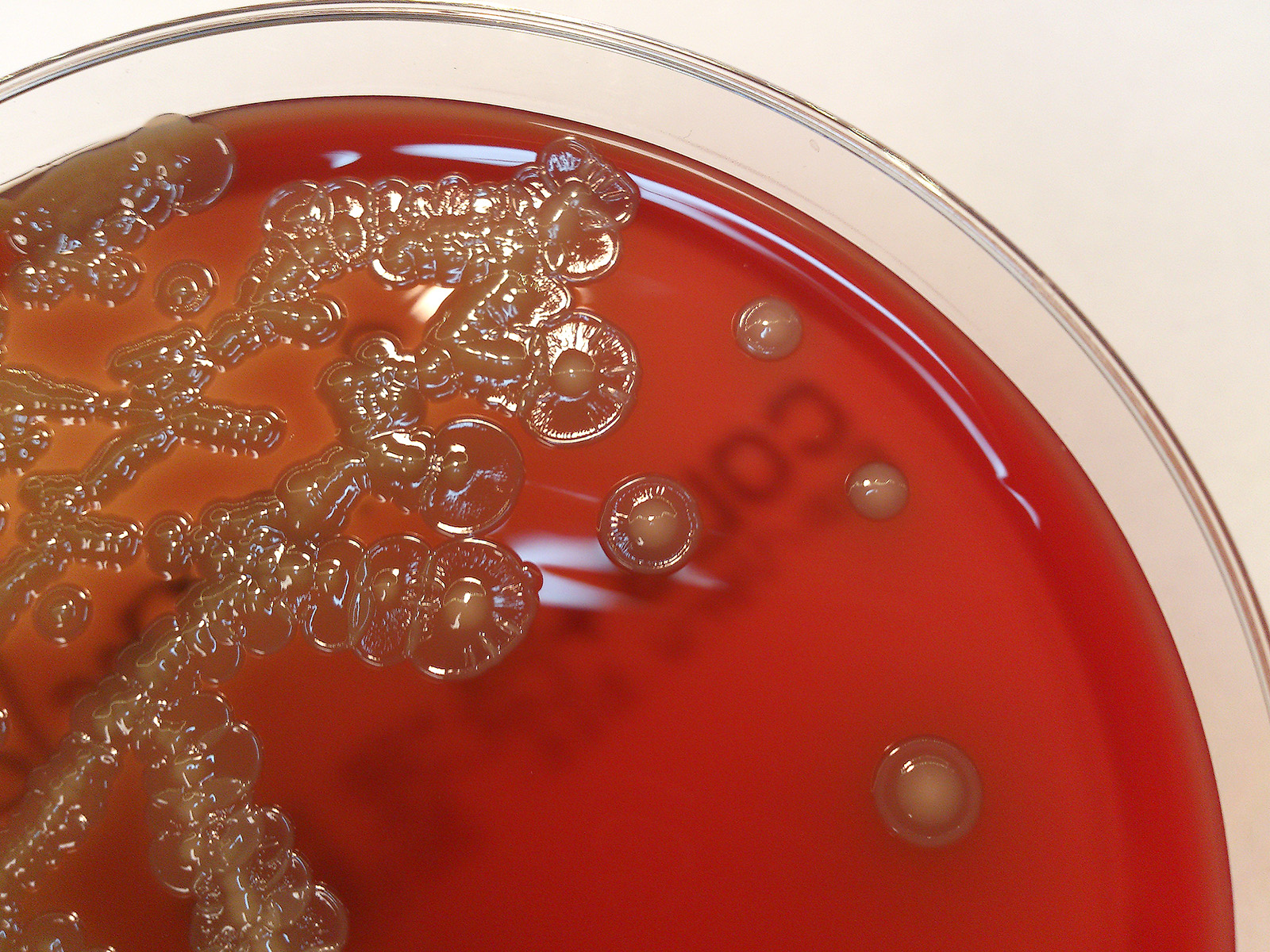
- Bergeyella zoohelcum

Scientific classification
- Domain: Bacteria
- Kingdom: Pseudomonadati
- Phylum: Bacteroidota
- Class: Flavobacteriia
- Order: Flavobacteriales; Bernardet 2012

Families
- Blattabacteriaceae; Crocinitomicaceae; Cryomorphaceae; Flavobacteriaceae; Ichthyobacteriaceae; Luteibaculaceae; Parvicellaceae; Salibacteraceae; Sanyastnellaceae; Schleiferiaceae; Vicingaceae; Weeksellaceae

= Flavobacteriales =

Order of bacteria

The order Flavobacteriales comprises several families of environmental bacteria.

== Comparative genomics and molecular signatures ==
Flavobacteriales is of one of the orders from the phylum Bacteroidota. Comparative genomic studies have identified several conserved indels, as well as 27 proteins that are uniquely shared by different sequenced Flavobacteriales and Bacteroidota species supporting this inference. Additionally, these studies have also identified 38 proteins that seem to be specific for the species from the order Flavobacteriales. Of these proteins, 26 were present in all sequenced species, while the remaining 12 were missing in only one or two species. These signature proteins provide potential molecular markers for this order. Several proteins have also been identified which are unique to the Flavobacteriales and Bacteroidales orders, indicating the species from these two orders shared a common ancestor exclusive of other Bacteroidota.

== Phylogeny ==
Phylogeny is the study of representation of evolutionary history and relationships between groups of organisms that are living. Closely related to phylogeny, the currently accepted taxonomy is based on the List of Prokaryotic names with Standing in Nomenclature, the naming and classification of living organisms. Phytogenetics requires large datasets through strenuous strands of experiments through mathematical models. To create the phylogenic relationships between the relationship of the list of twenty-one bacterium strands, in a tree like design, molecular evolutionary genetics analysis with the Kimura two-parameter model can be used. This is useful for analyzing the phytogenetic relationship among flavobacteriales fish-pathogens. It tells you whether a species of the bacterias are close or not.

Whole-genome based phylogeny (Note: Blattabacteriaceae is not included in this phylogenetic tree.)

- Flavobacteriales
  - Crocinitomicaceae
  - - - Cryomorphaceae
      - Schleiferiaceae
    - - - Ichthyobacteriaceae
        - Flavobacteriaceae
      - Weeksellaceae

16S rRNA based LTP_12_2021

- - Schleiferiaceae
  - - Salibacteraceae
    - - - - Cryomorphaceae
          - Vicingaceae
        - - Luteibaculaceae
          - Crocinitomicaceae
      - - - Ichthyobacteriaceae
          - Weeksellaceae
        - Flavobacteriaceae

GTDB 07-RS207 by Genome Taxonomy Database

- - Vicingaceae Bowman 2021
  - - - Salibacteraceae Bowman 2021
      - - - Luteibaculaceae Bowman 2021
          - Cryomorphaceae Bowman et al. 2003
        - Crocinitomicaceae Munoz et al. 2016
    - - Schleiferiaceae Albuquerque et al. 2011
      - - - Blattabacteriaceae Kambhampati 2012
          - Weeksellaceae García-López et al. 2020
        - - "Ca. Merdimorpha" Gilroy et al. 2021
          - - Ichthyobacteriaceae Takano et al. 2016
            - Flavobacteriaceae Reichenbach 1992

== See also ==
- List of bacterial orders
- List of bacteria genera
