= Pleomorphomonas =

Scientific classification
- Domain: Bacteria
- Kingdom: Pseudomonadati
- Phylum: Pseudomonadota
- Class: Alphaproteobacteria
- Order: Hyphomicrobiales
- Family: Pleomorphomonadaceae
- Genus: Pleomorphomonas; Xie and Yokota 2005

Type species
- Pleomorphomonas oryzae

Species
- Pleomorphomonas carboxyditropha Esquivel-Elizondo et al. 2018; Pleomorphomonas diazotrophica Madhaiyan et al. 2013; Pleomorphomonas koreensis Im et al. 2006; Pleomorphomonas oryzae Xie and Yokota 2005

Synonyms
- Pleomonas

Genus of bacteria

Pleomorphomonas is a genus of bacteria from the order Hyphomicrobiales.

== Phylogeny ==
The currently accepted taxonomy is based on the List of Prokaryotic names with Standing in Nomenclature (LPSN). The phylogeny is based on whole-genome analysis.

- - Pleomorphomonas
    - Pleomorphomonas koreensis
    - - Pleomorphomonas carboxyditropha
      - - Pleomorphomonas diazotrophica
        - Pleomorphomonas oryzae
  - outgroups
    - Mongoliimonas
    - Oharaeibacter
