= Parvibaculum hydrocarboniclasticum =

Scientific classification
- Domain: Bacteria
- Kingdom: Pseudomonadati
- Phylum: Pseudomonadota
- Class: Alphaproteobacteria
- Order: Hyphomicrobiales
- Family: Parvibaculaceae
- Genus: Parvibaculum
- Species: P. hydrocarboniclasticum

Binomial name
- Parvibaculum hydrocarboniclasticum Rosario-Passapera et al. 2012

Type strain
- DSM 23209, EPR92, JCM 16666

Species of bacterium

Parvibaculum hydrocarboniclasticum is an aerobic bacterium species from the genus Parvibaculum which has been isolated from hydrothermal fluids from the East Pacific Rise in the Pacific Ocean. Parvibaculum hydrocarboniclasticum can use n-alkanes like octane, dodecane and hexadecane as a sole source for carbon and energy.
