= Amorphus coralli =

Scientific classification
- Domain: Bacteria
- Kingdom: Pseudomonadati
- Phylum: Pseudomonadota
- Class: Alphaproteobacteria
- Order: Hyphomicrobiales
- Family: Amorphaceae
- Genus: Amorphus
- Species: A. coralli

Binomial name
- Amorphus coralli Zeevi Ben Yosef et al. 2008

Type strain
- DSM 19760, LMG 24307, RS.Sph.026

Species of bacterium

Amorphus coralli is a Gram-negative, halotolerant, heterotrophic and non-motile bacteria from the genus Amorphus which has been isolated from the Fungia granulosa from the Red Sea in Israel.
