= Anderseniella baltica =

Scientific classification
- Domain: Bacteria
- Kingdom: Pseudomonadati
- Phylum: Pseudomonadota
- Class: Alphaproteobacteria
- Order: Hyphomicrobiales
- Family: Parvibaculaceae
- Genus: Anderseniella
- Species: A. baltica

Binomial name
- Anderseniella baltica Brettar et al. 2007

Type strain
- BA141, Brettar BA 141, CIP 109499, LMG 24028

Species of bacterium

Anderseniella baltica is a bacterium species from the genus of Anderseniella which has been isolated from the Baltic Sea.
