= Kaistia adipata =

Scientific classification
- Domain: Bacteria
- Kingdom: Pseudomonadati
- Phylum: Pseudomonadota
- Class: Alphaproteobacteria
- Order: Hyphomicrobiales
- Family: Kaistiaceae
- Genus: Kaistia
- Species: K. adipata

Binomial name
- Kaistia adipata Im et al. 2005

Type strain
- Chj404, CIP 108816, DSM 17808, IAM 15023, JCM 21486, KCTC 12095

Species of bacterium

Kaistia adipata is a bacterium from the genus Kaistia which has been isolated from soil near the Chung-Ju industrial complex in Korea.
