= Stappia =

Scientific classification
- Domain: Bacteria
- Kingdom: Pseudomonadati
- Phylum: Pseudomonadota
- Class: Alphaproteobacteria
- Order: Hyphomicrobiales
- Family: Stappiaceae
- Genus: Stappia; Uchino et al. 1999

Type species
- Stappia stellulata (Rüger and Höfle 1992) Uchino et al. 1999

Species
- "Stappia aquimarina" Chen et al. 2010; "Stappia carboxidovorans" Weber and King 2007; "Stappia conradae" Weber and King 2007; Stappia indica Lai et al. 2010; "Stappia kahanamokuae" Weber and King 2007; "Stappia meyerae" Weber and King 2007; Stappia stellulata (Rüger and Höfle 1992) Uchino et al. 1999; Stappia taiwanensis Kämpfer et al. 2013

Genus of bacteria

Stappia is a genus of bacteria in the order Hyphomicrobiales. Some members of the genus (now transferred to Labrenzia) oxidize carbon monoxide (CO) aerobically. Stappia indica is a diatom associated bacterium which is known to inhibit the growth of diatoms such as Thalassiosira pseudonana.
