= Kaistia granuli =

Scientific classification
- Domain: Bacteria
- Kingdom: Pseudomonadati
- Phylum: Pseudomonadota
- Class: Alphaproteobacteria
- Order: Hyphomicrobiales
- Family: Kaistiaceae
- Genus: Kaistia
- Species: K. granuli

Binomial name
- Kaistia granuli Lee et al. 2007

Type strain
- KCTC 12575, Ko04, Lee Ko04, LMG 23410

Species of bacterium

Kaistia granuli is a Gram-negative, chemoorganotrophic, non-spore-forming, rod-shaped and non-motile bacterium from the genus Kaistia which has been isolated from sludge from a wastewater treatment plant in Gongju in Korea.
