= Kaistia geumhonensis =

Scientific classification
- Domain: Bacteria
- Kingdom: Pseudomonadati
- Phylum: Pseudomonadota
- Class: Alphaproteobacteria
- Order: Hyphomicrobiales
- Family: Kaistiaceae
- Genus: Kaistia
- Species: K. geumhonensis

Binomial name
- Kaistia geumhonensis Jin et al. 2011

Type strain
- B1-1, DSM 18799, KCTC 12849

Species of bacterium

Kaistia geumhonensis is a bacterium from the genus Kaistia which has been isolated from river sediments from the Geumho River in Korea.
