= Roseibium suaedae =

Scientific classification
- Domain: Bacteria
- Kingdom: Pseudomonadati
- Phylum: Pseudomonadota
- Class: Alphaproteobacteria
- Order: Hyphomicrobiales
- Family: Stappiaceae
- Genus: Roseibium
- Species: R. suaedae

Binomial name
- Roseibium suaedae (Bibi et al. 2014) Hördt et al. 2020

Type strain
- DSM 22153, KACC 13772, YC 6927

Synonyms
- Labrenzia suaedae Bibi et al. 2014

Species of bacterium

Roseibium suaedae is a Gram-negative and motile bacterium from the genus Roseibium, which has been isolated from the roots of the plant Suaeda maritima, from the Namhae Island in Korea.
