= Chelatococcus asaccharovorans =

Scientific classification
- Domain: Bacteria
- Kingdom: Pseudomonadati
- Phylum: Pseudomonadota
- Class: Alphaproteobacteria
- Order: Hyphomicrobiales
- Family: Chelatococcaceae
- Genus: Chelatococcus
- Species: C. asaccharovorans

Binomial name
- Chelatococcus asaccharovorans Auling et al. 1993

Type strain
- ATCC 51531, DSM 6462, Egli T2, KACC 10923, LMG 25503, NCIMB 13984, TE2, VTT E-072692

Species of bacterium

Chelatococcus asaccharovorans is a bacterium from the genus Chelatococcus.
