= Kaistia defluvii =

Scientific classification
- Domain: Bacteria
- Kingdom: Pseudomonadati
- Phylum: Pseudomonadota
- Class: Alphaproteobacteria
- Order: Hyphomicrobiales
- Family: Kaistiaceae
- Genus: Kaistia
- Species: K. defluvii

Binomial name
- Kaistia defluvii Jin et al. 2012

Type strain
- JCM 18034, KCTC 23766, B6-12

Species of bacterium

Kaistia defluvii is a Gram-negative, aerobic and non-motile bacterium from the genus Kaistia which has been isolated from river sediments from the River Geumho in Korea.
