= Camelimonas abortus =

Scientific classification
- Domain: Bacteria
- Kingdom: Pseudomonadati
- Phylum: Pseudomonadota
- Class: Alphaproteobacteria
- Order: Hyphomicrobiales
- Family: Chelatococcaceae
- Genus: Camelimonas
- Species: C. abortus

Binomial name
- Camelimonas abortus Kämpfer et al. 2012

Type strain
- BCRC 17770, CC-FH12-1, CCM 7491, CCM 7941, CCUG 61094, CIP 110303, DSM 19845, DSM 24741, UK34/07-5

Species of bacterium

Camelimonas abortus is a Gram-negative, rod-shaped and non-spore-forming bacteria from the genus Camelimonas which has been isolated from placental tissue of a Holstein Friesian cattle in Derbyshire in England.
