= Roseibium album =

Scientific classification
- Domain: Bacteria
- Kingdom: Pseudomonadati
- Phylum: Pseudomonadota
- Class: Alphaproteobacteria
- Order: Hyphomicrobiales
- Family: Stappiaceae
- Genus: Roseibium
- Species: R. album

Binomial name
- Roseibium album (Pujalte et al. 2006) Hördt et al. 2020

Type strain
- CECT 5095, CIP 108402, DSM 18380

Synonyms
- Labrenzia alba (Pujalte et al. 2006) Biebl et al. 2007; Stappia alba Pujalte et al. 2006

Species of bacterium

Roseibium album is a bacterium from the genus of Roseibium which has been isolated from an oyster from Valencia in Spain.
