= Kaistia dalseonensis =

Scientific classification
- Domain: Bacteria
- Kingdom: Pseudomonadati
- Phylum: Pseudomonadota
- Class: Alphaproteobacteria
- Order: Hyphomicrobiales
- Family: Kaistiaceae
- Genus: Kaistia
- Species: K. dalseonensis

Binomial name
- Kaistia dalseonensis Jin et al. 2011

Type strain
- B6-8, DSM 18800, KCTC 12850

Species of bacterium

Kaistia dalseonensis is a bacterium from the genus Kaistia which has been isolated from river sediments from the Dalseo Stream in Korea.
