= Roseibium marinum =

Scientific classification
- Domain: Bacteria
- Kingdom: Pseudomonadati
- Phylum: Pseudomonadota
- Class: Alphaproteobacteria
- Order: Hyphomicrobiales
- Family: Stappiaceae
- Genus: Roseibium
- Species: R. marinum

Binomial name
- Roseibium marinum (Kim et al. 2006) Hördt et al. 2020

Type strain
- DSM 17023, KCTC 12288

Synonyms
- Labrenzia marina (Kim et al. 2006) Biebl et al. 2007; Stappia marina Kim et al. 2006

Species of bacterium

Roseibium marinum is a Gram-negative, aerobic and halophilic bacterium from the genus Roseibium which has been isolated from seawater from the Yellow Sea in Korea.

Roseibium marinum is chemoheterotrophic, requiring organic matter for growth. Fermentation has not been observed, either in the presence of oxygen (under aerobic conditions) or under anaerobic conditions. Under anaerobic conditions (in the absence of oxygen), it can grow through denitrification.

It belongs to the aerobic anoxygenic phototrophic bacteria. These bacteria use light as an additional source of energy when nutrients are scarce or oxygen levels are low. Unlike anaerobic anoxygenic phototrophs, aerobic anoxygenic phototrophic bacteria produce bacteriochlorophyll a in the presence of oxygen. They have a quinone-like reaction centre and produce a range of carotenoids, which give them their characteristic pink or orange colour.
