= Kaistia soli =

Scientific classification
- Domain: Bacteria
- Kingdom: Pseudomonadati
- Phylum: Pseudomonadota
- Class: Alphaproteobacteria
- Order: Hyphomicrobiales
- Family: Kaistiaceae
- Genus: Kaistia
- Species: K. soli

Binomial name
- Kaistia soli Weon et al. 2008

Type strain
- 5YN9-8, DSM 19436, KACC 12605

Species of bacterium

Kaistia soli is a Gram-negative, strictly aerobic and non-motile bacterium from the genus Kaistia which has been isolated from a peat layer 1200 meter above sea level in Yongneup in Korea.
