= Pleomorphomonas diazotrophica =

Scientific classification
- Domain: Bacteria
- Kingdom: Pseudomonadati
- Phylum: Pseudomonadota
- Class: Alphaproteobacteria
- Order: Hyphomicrobiales
- Family: Pleomorphomonadaceae
- Genus: Pleomorphomonas
- Species: P. diazotrophica

Binomial name
- Pleomorphomonas diazotrophica Madhaiyan et al. 2013

Type strain
- DSM 25022, KACC 16233, R-5-392

Species of bacterium

Pleomorphomonas diazotrophica is a Gram-negative, aerobic, pleomorphic and nitrogen-fixing bacterium species from the genus Pleomorphomonas which has been isolated from root tissue of the plant Jatropha curcas at the agrotechnology experimental station in Singapore.
