= Amorphus orientalis =

Scientific classification
- Domain: Bacteria
- Kingdom: Pseudomonadati
- Phylum: Pseudomonadota
- Class: Alphaproteobacteria
- Order: Hyphomicrobiales
- Family: Amorphaceae
- Genus: Amorphus
- Species: A. orientalis

Binomial name
- Amorphus orientalis Wang et al. 2010

Type strain
- CCTCC AA 208035, DSM 21202, YIM D10

Species of bacterium

Amorphus orientalis is a Gram-negative, moderately halophilic, aerobic and non-motile bacteria from the genus Amorphus which has been isolated from sediments from a salt mine in Fenggang in China.
