= Kaistia terrae =

Scientific classification
- Domain: Bacteria
- Kingdom: Pseudomonadati
- Phylum: Pseudomonadota
- Class: Alphaproteobacteria
- Order: Hyphomicrobiales
- Family: Kaistiaceae
- Genus: Kaistia
- Species: K. terrae

Binomial name
- Kaistia terrae Kim et al. 2010

Type strain
- 5YN7-3, DSM 21341, KACC 12910

Species of bacterium

Kaistia terrae is a bacterium from the genus Kaistia which has been isolated from wetland soil from Yongneup in Korea.
