= Amorphus suaedae =

Scientific classification
- Domain: Bacteria
- Kingdom: Pseudomonadati
- Phylum: Pseudomonadota
- Class: Alphaproteobacteria
- Order: Hyphomicrobiales
- Family: Amorphaceae
- Genus: Amorphus
- Species: A. suaedae

Binomial name
- Amorphus suaedae Hwang et al. 2013

Type strain
- KACC 14912, NBRC 107845, YC6899

Species of bacterium

Amorphus suaedae is a Gram-negative, slightly halophilic, heterotrophic, rod-shaped and non-motile bacteria from the genus Amorphus which has been isolated from the roots of the plant Suaeda maritima on the Namhae Island in Korea.
