= Kaistia hirudinis =

Scientific classification
- Domain: Bacteria
- Kingdom: Pseudomonadati
- Phylum: Pseudomonadota
- Class: Alphaproteobacteria
- Order: Hyphomicrobiales
- Family: Kaistiaceae
- Genus: Kaistia
- Species: K. hirudinis

Binomial name
- Kaistia hirudinis Glaeser et al. 2013

Type strain
- CCM 8401, CIP 110381, E94, LMG 26925

Species of bacterium

Kaistia hirudinis is a Gram-negative and rod-shaped bacterium from the genus Kaistia which has been isolated from a leech (Hirudo verbana) from the Leech Breeding Station in Biebertal in Germany.
