= Camelimonas fluminis =

Scientific classification
- Domain: Bacteria
- Kingdom: Pseudomonadati
- Phylum: Pseudomonadota
- Class: Alphaproteobacteria
- Order: Hyphomicrobiales
- Family: Chelatococcaceae
- Genus: Camelimonas
- Species: C. fluminis

Binomial name
- Camelimonas fluminis Zhang et al. 2015

Type strain
- ACCC 19738, XZ2, KCTC 42282

Species of bacterium

Camelimonas fluminis is a Gram-negative, aerobic, short rod-shaped and non-spore-forming bacteria from the genus Camelimonas which has been isolated from water from the Hanjiang River in Wuhan in China. Camelimonas fluminis has the ability to degrade cyhalothrin.
