= Chelatococcus reniformis =

Scientific classification
- Domain: Bacteria
- Kingdom: Pseudomonadati
- Phylum: Pseudomonadota
- Class: Alphaproteobacteria
- Order: Hyphomicrobiales
- Family: Chelatococcaceae
- Genus: Chelatococcus
- Species: C. reniformis

Binomial name
- Chelatococcus reniformis Gu et al. 2016

Type strain
- CGMCC 1.12919, B2974, JCM 30308

Species of bacterium

Chelatococcus reniformis is a Gram-negative and non-motile bacterium from the genus Chelatococcus which has been isolated from the Muztagh Glacier on the Tibetan Plateau in China.
