= Roseibium salinum =

Scientific classification
- Domain: Bacteria
- Kingdom: Pseudomonadati
- Phylum: Pseudomonadota
- Class: Alphaproteobacteria
- Order: Hyphomicrobiales
- Family: Stappiaceae
- Genus: Roseibium
- Species: R. salinum

Binomial name
- Roseibium salinum (Camacho et al. 2016) Hördt et al. 2020

Type strain
- CECT 8816, DSM 29163, Cs25

Synonyms
- Labrenzia salina Camacho et al. 2016

Species of bacterium

Roseibium salinum is a Gram-negative, halophilic, rod-shaped, non-endospore-forming and motile bacterium from the genus Roseibium which has been isolated from the rhizosphere of the halophyte, Arthrocnemum macrostachyum.
