= Chelatococcus daeguensis =

Scientific classification
- Domain: Bacteria
- Kingdom: Pseudomonadati
- Phylum: Pseudomonadota
- Class: Alphaproteobacteria
- Order: Hyphomicrobiales
- Family: Chelatococcaceae
- Genus: Chelatococcus
- Species: C. daeguensis

Binomial name
- Chelatococcus daeguensis Yoon et al. 2008

Type strain
- CCUG 54519, K106, KCTC, LMG 25471, Yoon K106

Species of bacterium

Chelatococcus daeguensis is a Gram-negative, non-spore-forming bacteria from the genus Chelatococcus which was isolated from wastewater of a textile dye works in Daegu in the Republic of Korea.
