= Salinarimonas rosea =

Scientific classification
- Domain: Bacteria
- Kingdom: Pseudomonadati
- Phylum: Pseudomonadota
- Class: Alphaproteobacteria
- Order: Hyphomicrobiales
- Family: Salinarimonadaceae
- Genus: Salinarimonas
- Species: S. rosea

Binomial name
- Salinarimonas rosea Liu et al. 2010

Species of bacterium

Salinarimonas rosea is a Gram-negative, catalase- and oxidase-positive rod-shaped, halotolerant, motile bacteria from the genus of Salinarimonas which was isolated from sediment of a salt mine in Yunnan in the south-west of China.
