= Tepidamorphus gemmatus =

Scientific classification
- Domain: Bacteria
- Kingdom: Pseudomonadati
- Phylum: Pseudomonadota
- Class: Alphaproteobacteria
- Order: Hyphomicrobiales
- Family: Tepidamorphaceae
- Genus: Tepidamorphus
- Species: T. gemmatus

Binomial name
- Tepidamorphus gemmatus Albuquerque et al. 2010

Type strain
- CB-27A, DSM 19345, LMG 24113

Species of bacterium

Tepidamorphus gemmatus is a slightly thermophilic, Gram-negative and rod-shaped bacterium species from the genus of Tepidamorphus which has been isolated from a hot spring from the Furnas area on the São Miguel Island on the Azores.
