= Rhodobium gokarnense =

Scientific classification
- Domain: Bacteria
- Kingdom: Pseudomonadati
- Phylum: Pseudomonadota
- Class: Alphaproteobacteria
- Order: Hyphomicrobiales
- Family: Rhodobiaceae
- Genus: Rhodobium
- Species: R. gokarnense

Binomial name
- Rhodobium gokarnense Srinivas et al. 2007

Type strain
- ATCC BAA-1275, CIP 109649, DSM 17935, JA173, JCM 13532, strain JA173

Synonyms
- Rhodobium gokurnum

Species of bacterium

Rhodobium gokarnense is a phototrophic bacterium species from the genus of Rhodobium which has been isolated from soil in Gokarna in India.
