= Oharaeibacter diazotrophicus =

Scientific classification
- Domain: Bacteria
- Kingdom: Pseudomonadati
- Phylum: Pseudomonadota
- Class: Alphaproteobacteria
- Order: Hyphomicrobiales
- Family: Pleomorphomonadaceae
- Genus: Oharaeibacter
- Species: O. diazotrophicus

Binomial name
- Oharaeibacter diazotrophicus Lv et al. 2017

Type strain
- DSM 102969, NBRC 111955, SM30

Species of bacterium

Oharaeibacter diazotrophicus is a Gram-negative, aerobic and motile bacteria from the genus Oharaeibacter which has been isolated from the rhizosphere of rice plants.
