= Camelimonas lactis =

Scientific classification
- Domain: Bacteria
- Kingdom: Pseudomonadati
- Phylum: Pseudomonadota
- Class: Alphaproteobacteria
- Order: Hyphomicrobiales
- Family: Chelatococcaceae
- Genus: Camelimonas
- Species: C. lactis

Binomial name
- Camelimonas lactis Kämpfer et al. 2010

Type strain
- CCM 7696, CCUG 58638, M 1878 SK2, M 1973, M 2040

Species of bacterium

Camelimonas lactis is a Gram-negative, rod-shaped and non-spore-forming bacteria from the genus Camelimonas which has been isolated from camel milk in the United Arab Emirates.
