= Chelatococcus sambhunathii =

Scientific classification
- Domain: Bacteria
- Kingdom: Pseudomonadati
- Phylum: Pseudomonadota
- Class: Alphaproteobacteria
- Order: Hyphomicrobiales
- Family: Chelatococcaceae
- Genus: Chelatococcus
- Species: C. sambhunathii

Binomial name
- Chelatococcus sambhunathii Panday and Das 2010

Type strain
- Das HT4, DSM 18167, HT4, JCM 14988, LMG 26063

Species of bacterium

Chelatococcus sambhunathii is a gram-negative, aerobic catalase- and oxidase-positive motile bacteria with a single polar flagellum from the genus Chelatococcus which was isolated from sediment of a hot sulfur spring in Orissa in India.
