= Salinarimonas ramus =

Scientific classification
- Domain: Bacteria
- Kingdom: Pseudomonadati
- Phylum: Pseudomonadota
- Class: Alphaproteobacteria
- Order: Hyphomicrobiales
- Family: Salinarimonadaceae
- Genus: Salinarimonas
- Species: S. ramus

Binomial name
- Salinarimonas ramus Cai et al. 2011

Synonyms
- Salinarimonas ramea

Species of bacterium

Salinarimonas ramus is a Gram-negative, rod-shaped motile bacterium with a single polar flagellum of the genus Salinarimonas, isolated from crude oil-contaminated saline soil of the Shengli Oilfield in China.
