= Pleomorphomonas koreensis =

Scientific classification
- Domain: Bacteria
- Kingdom: Pseudomonadati
- Phylum: Pseudomonadota
- Class: Alphaproteobacteria
- Order: Hyphomicrobiales
- Family: Pleomorphomonadaceae
- Genus: Pleomorphomonas
- Species: P. koreensis

Binomial name
- Pleomorphomonas koreensis Im et al. 2006

Type strain
- KCTC 12246, NBRC 100803, Y9

Synonyms
- Kaistina koreensis

Species of bacterium

Pleomorphomonas koreensis is a Gram-negative, aerobic, nitrogen-fixing, non-spore-forming rod-shaped and non-motile bacterium species from the genus Pleomorphomonas which has been isolated from soil in Daejeon in Korea.
