= Rhodoblastus sphagnicola =

Scientific classification
- Domain: Bacteria
- Kingdom: Pseudomonadati
- Phylum: Pseudomonadota
- Class: Alphaproteobacteria
- Order: Hyphomicrobiales
- Family: Roseiarcaceae
- Genus: Rhodoblastus
- Species: R. sphagnicola

Binomial name
- Rhodoblastus sphagnicola Kulichevskaya et al. 2006

Species of bacterium

Rhodoblastus sphagnicola is a rod-shaped bacteria with a polar flagella from the genus Rhodoblastus which was isolated from acidic Sphagnum peat from Sosvyatskoe bog in the Tver Region in the West Dvinskiy district in Russia.
