= Roseibium alexandrii =

Scientific classification
- Domain: Bacteria
- Kingdom: Pseudomonadati
- Phylum: Pseudomonadota
- Class: Alphaproteobacteria
- Order: Hyphomicrobiales
- Family: Stappiaceae
- Genus: Roseibium
- Species: R. alexandrii

Binomial name
- Roseibium alexandrii (Biebl et al. 2007) Hördt et al. 2020

Type strain
- DSM 17067, NCIMB 14079, strain DFL-11

Synonyms
- Labrenzia alexandrii Biebl et al. 2007

Species of bacterium

Roseibium alexandrii is a bacterium from the genus of Roseibium, which has been isolated from the dinoflagellate Alexandrium lusitanicum in Germany.
