= Pleomorphomonas oryzae =

Scientific classification
- Domain: Bacteria
- Kingdom: Pseudomonadati
- Phylum: Pseudomonadota
- Class: Alphaproteobacteria
- Order: Hyphomicrobiales
- Family: Pleomorphomonadaceae
- Genus: Pleomorphomonas
- Species: P. oryzae

Binomial name
- Pleomorphomonas oryzae Xie and Yokota 2005

Type strain
- ATCC BAA-940, DSM 16300, F-7, IAM 15079, JCM 21540, NBRC 102288

Synonyms
- Pleomonas oryzae

Species of bacterium

Pleomorphomonas oryzae is a nitrogen-fixing bacterium species from the genus Pleomorphomonas which has been isolated from the rice plant Oryza sativa in Japan.
