= Rhodobium orientis =

Scientific classification
- Domain: Bacteria
- Kingdom: Pseudomonadati
- Phylum: Pseudomonadota
- Class: Alphaproteobacteria
- Order: Hyphomicrobiales
- Family: Rhodobiaceae
- Genus: Rhodobium
- Species: R. orientis

Binomial name
- Rhodobium orientis Hiraishi et al. 1995

Type strain
- ATCC 51972, DSM 11290, JCM 9337, MB312, NCIMB 13423, strain MB312

Synonyms
- Rhodobium orientalis, Rhodohalobium orientum

Species of bacterium

Rhodobium orientis is a phototrophic, Gram-negative, rod-shaped and motile bacterium species from the genus of Rhodobium which has been isolated from coastal seawater from Makurazaki in Japan.
