= Chthonobacter albigriseus =

Scientific classification
- Domain: Bacteria
- Kingdom: Pseudomonadati
- Phylum: Pseudomonadota
- Class: Alphaproteobacteria
- Order: Hyphomicrobiales
- Family: Pleomorphomonadaceae
- Genus: Chthonobacter
- Species: C. albigriseus

Binomial name
- Chthonobacter albigriseus Kim et al. 2017

Type strain
- JCM 30603, KCTC 42450, ED7

Species of bacterium

Chthonobacter albigriseus is a Gram-negative, aerobic and non-motile bacteria from the genus Chthonobacter which has been isolated from grass-field soil in Cheonan on Korea.
