= Chelatococcus caeni =

Scientific classification
- Domain: Bacteria
- Kingdom: Pseudomonadati
- Phylum: Pseudomonadota
- Class: Alphaproteobacteria
- Order: Hyphomicrobiales
- Family: Chelatococcaceae
- Genus: Chelatococcus
- Species: C. caeni

Binomial name
- Chelatococcus caeni Jin et al. 2015

Type strain
- EBR-4-1, JCM 30181, KCTC 32487

Species of bacterium

Chelatococcus caeni is a Gram-negative, non-spore-forming, rod-shaped and motile bacterium from the genus Chelatococcus which has been isolated from biofilm reactor sludge in Korea.
