= Parvibaculum lavamentivorans =

Scientific classification
- Domain: Bacteria
- Kingdom: Pseudomonadati
- Phylum: Pseudomonadota
- Class: Alphaproteobacteria
- Order: Hyphomicrobiales
- Family: Parvibaculaceae
- Genus: Parvibaculum
- Species: P. lavamentivorans

Binomial name
- Parvibaculum lavamentivorans Schleheck et al. 2004

Type strain
- DS-1, DSM 13023, NCIMB 13966

Species of bacterium

Parvibaculum lavamentivorans is a bacterium species from the genus Parvibaculum which has been isolated from activated sludge in Germany. Parvibaculum lavamentivorans can metabolize linear alkylbenzenesulfonates like alkyldiphenyletherdisulfonate.
