= Methylobrevis pamukkalensis =

Scientific classification
- Domain: Bacteria
- Kingdom: Pseudomonadati
- Phylum: Pseudomonadota
- Class: Alphaproteobacteria
- Order: Hyphomicrobiales
- Family: Pleomorphomonadaceae
- Genus: Methylobrevis
- Species: M. pamukkalensis

Binomial name
- Methylobrevis pamukkalensis Poroshina et al. 2015

Genus of bacteria

Methylobrevis pamukkalensis is a species of bacteria.
