= Lichenibacterium =

Scientific classification
- Domain: Bacteria
- Kingdom: Pseudomonadati
- Phylum: Pseudomonadota
- Class: Alphaproteobacteria
- Order: Hyphomicrobiales
- Family: Lichenibacteriaceae; Pankratov et al. 2020
- Genus: Lichenibacterium; Pankratov et al. 2020

Species
- Lichenibacterium minor Pankratov et al. 2020; Lichenibacterium ramalinae Pankratov et al. 2020

Family of bacteria

Lichenibacterium is a genus of Alphaproteobacteria. It is the only genus in the monotypic family Lichenibacteriaceae.

== Taxonomic considerations ==
Whole-genome analyses of type strains indicate that Lichenibacterium and Lichenihabitans (Lichenihabitantaceae) form a well-supported monophyletic group. Broader genome and metagenome-based analyses further support inclusion of Lichenifustis (Lichenihabitantaceae) within the same lineage.

Based on phylogenomic analyses, the relationships among described species are as follows:

- other Hyphomicrobiales
- - Roseiarcaceae
  - - Beijerinckiaceae
    - - Rhodoblastaceae
      - Methylocystaceae
  - - Lichenibacteriaceae
      - Lichenibacterium ramalinae
      - - Lichenibacterium minor
        - Lichenibacterium dinghuense
    - Lichenihabitantaceae
      - Lichenihabitans
        L. psoromatis
      - Lichenifustis
        L. flavocetrariae

Formal taxonomic emendations merging Lichenibacteriaceae into Lichenihabitantaceae have not yet been validly published.
