= Parvibaculum indicum =

Scientific classification
- Domain: Bacteria
- Kingdom: Pseudomonadati
- Phylum: Pseudomonadota
- Class: Alphaproteobacteria
- Order: Hyphomicrobiales
- Family: Parvibaculaceae
- Genus: Parvibaculum
- Species: P. indicum

Binomial name
- Parvibaculum indicum Lai et al. 2011

Type strain
- CCTCC AB 208230, Lai P31, LMG 24712, MCCC 1A01132, P31

Synonyms
- Parvibaculum marina

Species of bacterium

Parvibaculum indicum is a Gram-negative, rod-shaped and motile bacterium with a polar flagellum species from the genus Parvibaculum which has been isolated from deep-sea water from the Indian Ocean.
