= Kaistia algarum =

Scientific classification
- Domain: Bacteria
- Kingdom: Pseudomonadati
- Phylum: Pseudomonadota
- Class: Alphaproteobacteria
- Order: Hyphomicrobiales
- Family: Kaistiaceae
- Genus: Kaistia
- Species: K. algarum

Binomial name
- Kaistia algarum Lee and Jeon 2018

Type strain
- LYH11

Species of bacterium

Kaistia algarum is a Gram-negative, strictly aerobic and non-motile bacterium from the genus Kaistia which has been isolated from the alga Paulinella chromatophora.
