= Rhodobaca =

Scientific classification
- Domain: Bacteria
- Kingdom: Pseudomonadati
- Phylum: Pseudomonadota
- Class: Alphaproteobacteria
- Order: Hyphomicrobiales
- Family: Stappiaceae
- Genus: Rhodobaca; Milford et al. 2001

Species
- Rhodobaca bogoriensis

Genus of bacteria

Rhodobaca is a genus of bacteria in the family Rhodobacteraceae.
