= Blastochloris sulfoviridis =

Scientific classification
- Domain: Bacteria
- Kingdom: Pseudomonadati
- Phylum: Pseudomonadota
- Class: Alphaproteobacteria
- Order: Hyphomicrobiales
- Family: Blastochloridaceae
- Genus: Blastochloris
- Species: B. sulfoviridis

Binomial name
- Blastochloris sulfoviridis Hiraishi 1997

Type strain
- DSM 729, IFO 16694, NBRC 103805, V.M. Gorlenko P1

Synonyms
- Rhodopseudomonas sulfoviridis

Species of bacterium

Blastochloris sulfoviridis is a bacterium from the genus Blastochloris which uses sulfur compounds as a source of energy. Blastochloris sulfoviridis was isolated from a sulfur spring in the Soviet Union
