= Rhodoblastus =

Scientific classification
- Domain: Bacteria
- Kingdom: Pseudomonadati
- Phylum: Pseudomonadota
- Class: Alphaproteobacteria
- Order: Hyphomicrobiales
- Family: Roseiarcaceae
- Genus: Rhodoblastus; Imhoff 2001

Type species
- Rhodoblastus acidophilus

Species
- R. acidophilus R. sphagnicola

Genus of bacteria

Rhodoblastus is a genus of bacteria from the order Hyphomicrobiales.
