= Pannonibacter =

Scientific classification
- Domain: Bacteria
- Kingdom: Pseudomonadati
- Phylum: Pseudomonadota
- Class: Alphaproteobacteria
- Order: Hyphomicrobiales
- Family: Stappiaceae
- Genus: Pannonibacter; Borsodi et al. 2003

Species
- Pannonibacter carbonis Xi et al. 2018; Pannonibacter indicus corrig. Bandyopadhyay et al. 2013; Pannonibacter phragmitetus Borsodi et al. 2003

Genus of bacteria

Pannonibacter is a genus of bacteria in the order Hyphomicrobiales.
