= Bosea lathyri =

Scientific classification
- Domain: Bacteria
- Kingdom: Pseudomonadati
- Phylum: Pseudomonadota
- Class: Alphaproteobacteria
- Order: Hyphomicrobiales
- Family: Boseaceae
- Genus: Bosea
- Species: B. lathyri

Binomial name
- Bosea lathyri De Meyer and Willems 2012

Type strain
- CCUG 61247, De Meyer R-46060, LMG 26379, R-46060

Species of bacterium

Bosea lathyri is a Gram-negative, rod-shaped bacteria from the genus Bosea.
