= Kaistia =

Scientific classification
- Domain: Bacteria
- Kingdom: Pseudomonadati
- Phylum: Pseudomonadota
- Class: Alphaproteobacteria
- Order: Hyphomicrobiales
- Family: Kaistiaceae
- Genus: Kaistia; Im et al. 2005

Type species
- Kaistia adipata

Species
- Kaistia adipata; Kaistia algarum; Kaistia dalseonensis; Kaistia defluvii; Kaistia geumhonensis; Kaistia granuli; Kaistia hirudinis; Kaistia soli; Kaistia terrae

Genus of bacteria

Kaistia is a genus of bacteria from the order Hyphomicrobiales.

== Phylogeny ==
The currently accepted taxonomy is based on the List of Prokaryotic names with Standing in Nomenclature (LPSN). The phylogeny is based on whole-genome analysis.

- - Kaistia
    - - - Kaistia adipata
        - - - Kaistia terrae
            - Kaistia defluvii
          - Kaistia granuli
      - Kaistia dalseonensis
    - - - - Kaistia hirudinis
          - Kaistia geumhonensis
        - Kaistia algarum
      - Kaistia soli
  - outgroup
    Bauldia
