= Acuticoccus =

Scientific classification
- Domain: Bacteria
- Kingdom: Pseudomonadati
- Phylum: Pseudomonadota
- Class: Alphaproteobacteria
- Order: Hyphomicrobiales
- Family: Amorphaceae
- Genus: Acuticoccus; Hou et al. 2017

Type species
- Acuticoccus yangtzensis

Species
- A. yangtzensis

Genus of bacteria

Actibacterium is a Gram-negative and aerobic genus of bacteria from the order of Hyphomicrobiales with one known species (Acuticoccus yangtzensis). Acuticoccus yangtzensis has been isolated from water from the Yangtze in China.
