= Hartmannibacter =

Scientific classification
- Domain: Bacteria
- Kingdom: Pseudomonadati
- Phylum: Pseudomonadota
- Class: Alphaproteobacteria
- Order: Hyphomicrobiales
- Family: Pleomorphomonadaceae
- Genus: Hartmannibacter; Suarez et al. 2014

Type species
- Hartmannibacter diazotrophicus

Species
- H. diazotrophicus

Genus of bacteria

Hartmannibacter is a Gram-negative, nitrogen-fixing, strictly aerobic and motile genus of bacteria. Hartmannibacter is named after the German microbiologist Anton Hartmann. Hartmannibacter diazotrophicus has been isolated from rhizospheric soil of the plant Plantago winteri.
