= Phreatobacter oligotrophus =

Scientific classification
- Domain: Bacteria
- Kingdom: Pseudomonadati
- Phylum: Pseudomonadota
- Class: Alphaproteobacteria
- Order: Hyphomicrobiales
- Family: Phreatobacteraceae
- Genus: Phreatobacter
- Species: P. oligotrophus

Binomial name
- Phreatobacter oligotrophus Tóth et al. 2014

Species of bacterium

Phreatobacter oligotrophus is a bacterium from the genus Phreatobacter which has been isolated from ultrapure water from a power plant in Hungaria.
