= Pseudoxanthobacter liyangensis =

Scientific classification
- Domain: Bacteria
- Kingdom: Pseudomonadati
- Phylum: Pseudomonadota
- Class: Alphaproteobacteria
- Order: Hyphomicrobiales
- Family: Pseudoxanthobacteraceae
- Genus: Pseudoxanthobacter
- Species: P. liyangensis

Binomial name
- Pseudoxanthobacter liyangensis Liu et al. 2014

Type strain
- CCTCC AB 2013167, KACC 16601, DDT-3

Species of bacterium

Pseudoxanthobacter liyangensis is a Gram-negative, rod-shaped, nitrogen fixing aerobic bacterium which has been isolated from soil in Liyang in China.
