= Afifella marina =

Scientific classification
- Domain: Bacteria
- Kingdom: Pseudomonadati
- Phylum: Pseudomonadota
- Class: Alphaproteobacteria
- Order: Hyphomicrobiales
- Family: Afifellaceae
- Genus: Afifella
- Species: A. marina

Binomial name
- Afifella marina (Imhoff 1984) Urdiain et al. 2009

Type strain
- ATCC 35675, BCRC 16414, BN126, CCRC 16414, CIP 104405, DSM 2698, Imhoff BN 126, NBRC 100434, NCIMB 2201

Synonyms
- Rhodobium marinum (Imhoff 1984) Hiraishi et al. 1995; Rhodopseudomonas marina Imhoff 1984

Species of bacterium

Afifella marina is a phototrophic bacterial species of the genus Afifella.
