= Camelimonas =

Scientific classification
- Domain: Bacteria
- Kingdom: Pseudomonadati
- Phylum: Pseudomonadota
- Class: Alphaproteobacteria
- Order: Hyphomicrobiales
- Family: Chelatococcaceae
- Genus: Camelimonas; Kämpfer et al. 2010

Type species
- Camelimonas lactis

Species
- Camelimonas abortus; Camelimonas fluminis; Camelimonas lactis

Genus of bacteria

Camelimonas is a genus of bacteria from the order Hyphomicrobiales.
