= Salinarimonas =

Scientific classification
- Domain: Bacteria
- Kingdom: Pseudomonadati
- Phylum: Pseudomonadota
- Class: Alphaproteobacteria
- Order: Hyphomicrobiales
- Family: Salinarimonadaceae
- Genus: Salinarimonas; Liu et al. 2010

Type species
- Salinarimonas rosea

Species
- S. ramus Cai et al. 2011; S. rosea Liu et al. 2010

Genus of bacteria

Salinarimonas is a genus of bacteria from the order of Hyphomicrobiales.
