= Blastochloris viridis =

Scientific classification
- Domain: Bacteria
- Kingdom: Pseudomonadati
- Phylum: Pseudomonadota
- Class: Alphaproteobacteria
- Order: Hyphomicrobiales
- Family: Blastochloridaceae
- Genus: Blastochloris
- Species: B. viridis

Binomial name
- Blastochloris viridis Hiraishi 1997

Type strain
- ATCC 19567, CCUG 30818, CCUG 31172, CCUG 7830, Drews F, DSM 133, HAMBI 1089, LMG 4321, LMG 4325, NBRC 102659, NHTC 133

Synonyms
- Rhodopseudomonas viridis

Species of bacterium

Blastochloris viridis is a bacterium from the genus Blastochloris which was isolated from water of the Dreisam river in Freiburg im Breisgau, Germany.

It is one of the lowest energy phototrophs on Earth, owing to its utilisation of bacteriochlorophyll b which yields an absorption maximum of 1015 nm when complexed with the reaction centre.
