= Anderseniella =

Scientific classification
- Domain: Bacteria
- Kingdom: Pseudomonadati
- Phylum: Pseudomonadota
- Class: Alphaproteobacteria
- Order: Hyphomicrobiales
- Family: Parvibaculaceae
- Genus: Anderseniella; Brettar et al. 2007

Type species
- Anderseniella baltica

Species
- A. baltica

Genus of bacteria

Anderseniella is a genus of bacteria from the family of Rhodobiaceae. Up to now there is only one species of this genus known (Anderseniella baltica).
