= Afifella pfennigii =

Scientific classification
- Domain: Bacteria
- Kingdom: Pseudomonadati
- Phylum: Pseudomonadota
- Class: Alphaproteobacteria
- Order: Hyphomicrobiales
- Family: Afifellaceae
- Genus: Afifella
- Species: A. pfennigii

Binomial name
- Afifella pfennigii Urdiain et al. 2009

Synonyms
- Rhodobium pfennigii Caumette et al. 2007

Species of bacterium

Afifella pfennigii is a bacterial species from the genus Afifella which has been isolated from benthic microbial mat from a brackish water pond on the Rangiroa Atoll on the French Polynesia Islands.
