= Bosea vestrisii =

Scientific classification
- Domain: Bacteria
- Kingdom: Pseudomonadati
- Phylum: Pseudomonadota
- Class: Alphaproteobacteria
- Order: Hyphomicrobiales
- Family: Boseaceae
- Genus: Bosea
- Species: B. vestrisii

Binomial name
- Bosea vestrisii La Scola et al. 2003

Type strain
- 34635, CCUG 43114, CIP 106340

Species of bacterium

Bosea vestrisii is a bacterium from the genus Bosea which was isolated from hospital water.
