= Pseudoxanthobacter soli =

Scientific classification
- Domain: Bacteria
- Kingdom: Pseudomonadati
- Phylum: Pseudomonadota
- Class: Alphaproteobacteria
- Order: Hyphomicrobiales
- Family: Pseudoxanthobacteraceae
- Genus: Pseudoxanthobacter
- Species: P. soli

Binomial name
- Pseudoxanthobacter soli Arun et al. 2008

Type strain
- CC4, CIP 109513, DSM 19599

Species of bacterium

Pseudoxanthobacter soli is a Gram negative, aerobic rod-shaped and nitrogen fixing bacterium which has been isolated from soil from an agricultural research field station in Kaohsiung County in Taiwan.
