= Antenna complex in purple bacteria =

Antenna complex alpha/beta subunit
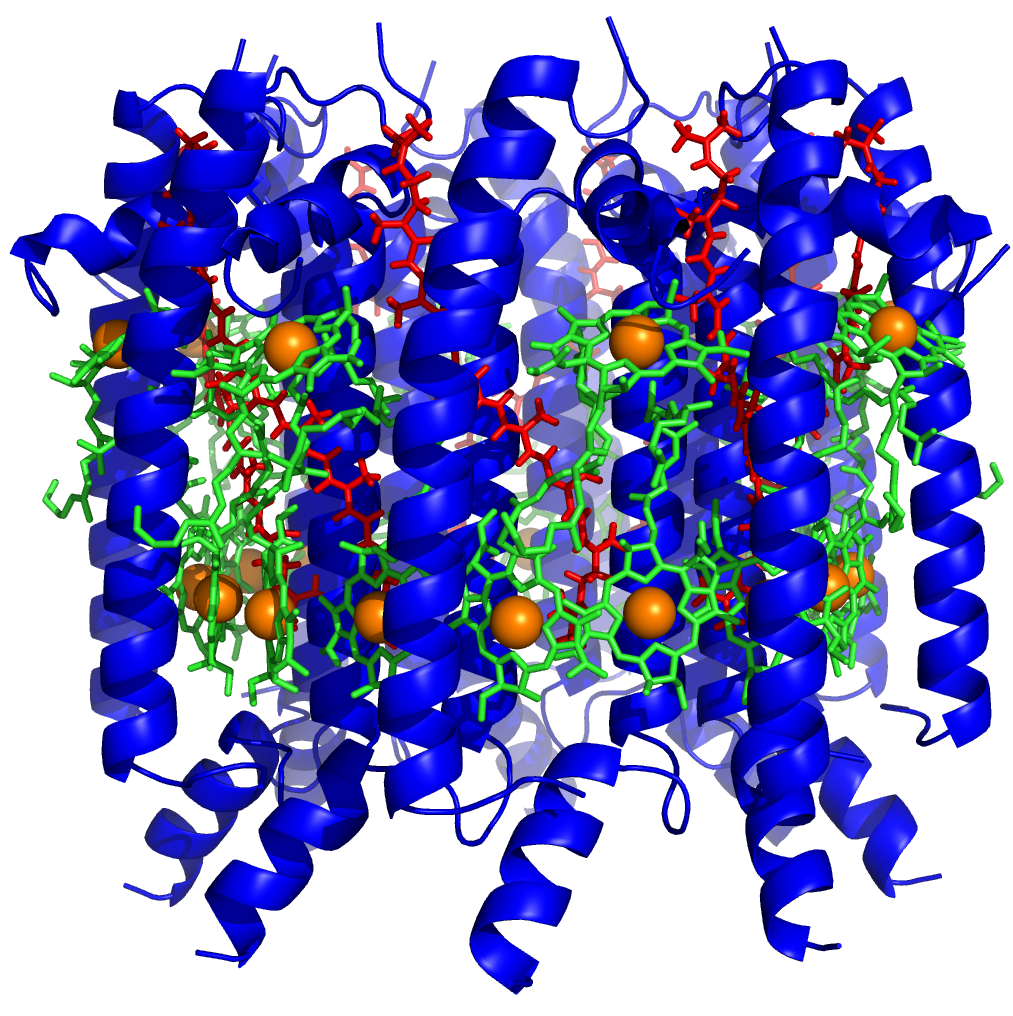
- Structure of the light-harvesting complex II.

Identifiers
- Symbol: LHC
- Pfam: PF00556
- InterPro: IPR000066
- PROSITE: PDOC00748
- SCOP2: 1lgh / SCOPe / SUPFAM
- OPM superfamily: 2
- OPM protein: 1lgh
Available protein structures:
- PDB: IPR000066 PF00556 (ECOD; PDBsum)
- AlphaFold: IPR000066; PF00556

The antenna complex in purple photosynthetic bacteria are protein complexes responsible for the transfer of solar energy to the photosynthetic reaction centre. Purple bacteria, particularly Rhodopseudomonas acidophila of purple non-sulfur bacteria, have been one of the main groups of organisms used to study bacterial antenna complexes so much is known about this group's photosynthetic components. It is one of the many independent types of light-harvesting complex used by various photosynthetic organisms.

In photosynthetic purple bacteria there are usually two antenna complexes that are generally composed of two types of polypeptides (alpha and beta chains). These proteins are arranged in a ring-like fashion creating a cylinder that spans the membrane; the proteins bind two or three types of bacteriochlorophyll (BChl) molecules and different types of carotenoids depending on the species. LH2 is the outer antenna complex that spans the membrane. It is peripheral to LH1, an antenna complex (also known as the core antenna complex) that is directly associated with the reaction centre, with the RC at the center of its elliptical ring. Unlike for LH1 complexes, the amount of LH2 complexes present vary with growth conditions and light intensity.

Both the alpha and the beta chains of antenna complexes are small proteins of 42 to 68 residues which share a three-domain organization. They are composed of a N-terminal hydrophilic cytoplasmic domain followed by a transmembrane region and a C-terminal hydrophilic periplasmic domain. In the transmembrane region of both chains there is a conserved histidine which is most probably involved in the binding of the magnesium atom of a bacteriochlorophyll group. The beta chains contain an additional conserved histidine which is located at the C-terminal extremity of the cytoplasmic domain and which is also thought to be involved in bacteriochlorophyll-binding.

The particular chemical environment of the Bchl molecules influences the wavelength of light they are able to absorb. LH2 complexes of R. acidophils have BChl a molecules that absorb at 850 nm and 800 nm respectively. BChl a molecules that absorb at 850 nm are present in a hydrophobic environment. These pigments are in contact with a number of non-polar, hydrophobic residues. BChl a molecules that absorb at 800 nm are present in a relatively polar environment. The formylated N-terminus of the alpha polypeptide, a nearby histidine, and a water molecule are responsible for this.

== Subfamilies ==
- Antenna complex, alpha subunit InterPro: IPR002361
- Antenna complex, beta subunit InterPro: IPR002362
