= Rhodobium (bacterium) =

Scientific classification
- Domain: Bacteria
- Kingdom: Pseudomonadati
- Phylum: Pseudomonadota
- Class: Alphaproteobacteria
- Order: Hyphomicrobiales
- Family: Rhodobiaceae
- Genus: Rhodobium; Hiraishi et al. 1995

Species
- Rhodobium gokarnense Srinivas et al. 2007; Rhodobium orientis Hiraishi et al. 1995

Genus of bacteria

Rhodobium is a genus of purple non-sulfur bacteria. The cells are rod-shaped and reproduce by budding, as in many other members of the Hyphomicrobiales. RNA trees separate it from the others, however, and it is given its own family. R. orientis, the type species, was isolated from seawater in 1995. It is capable of photosynthetic hydrogen production via the nitrogenase enzyme.
