= Lichenihabitantaceae =

Scientific classification
- Domain: Bacteria
- Kingdom: Pseudomonadati
- Phylum: Pseudomonadota
- Class: Alphaproteobacteria
- Order: Hyphomicrobiales
- Family: Lichenihabitantaceae; Noh et al. 2019

Type genus
- Lichenihabitans

Genera
- Lichenihabitans; Lichenifustis

Lichenihabitantaceae is a family of Gram-negative bacteria within the order Hyphomicrobiales (formerly Rhizobiales) in the class Alphaproteobacteria. The family was first proposed in 2019 to accommodate the genus Lichenihabitans, isolated from Antarctic lichens.

== Taxonomy ==
The family Lichenihabitantaceae was validly published by Noh et al. in 2019 following the description of Lichenihabitans psoromatis.

According to the List of Prokaryotic names with Standing in Nomenclature (LPSN), the family currently includes the genera:

- Lichenihabitans
- Lichenifustis

The genus Lichenibacterium is presently classified in the separate family Lichenibacteriaceae according to LPSN, although genome-based studies have suggested close phylogenetic relationships between these taxa.

== Description ==
Members of the family are Gram-negative, chemo-organotrophic bacteria typically isolated from lichen thalli.

Cells are rod-shaped and may be motile or non-motile depending on the genus and growth stage. Colonies are typically pink to orange due to carotenoid-type pigments.

Growth occurs at low to moderate temperatures (4–35 °C), reflecting adaptation to cold and temperate environments. Most species grow optimally in slightly acidic to neutral pH conditions and are sensitive to elevated NaCl concentrations.

Metabolically, members utilize a broad range of carbohydrates and organic acids and are primarily aerobic. Nitrogen fixation and methylotrophic growth have not been demonstrated in the type species of Lichenihabitans.

== Ecology ==
Members of Lichenihabitantaceae are predominantly associated with lichens. The type species were isolated from Antarctic and Arctic lichens, including Psoroma antarcticum and Flavocetraria nivalis.

Metagenomic studies have detected Lichenihabitantaceae in lichen microbiomes worldwide and in moss-associated microbial communities.

A recent phylogenomic and metagenomic meta-analysis of phyllosphere-associated bacteria identified Lichenihabitantaceae as a dominant family at the surface of plant leaves.

== Phylogeny ==
Phylogenomic analyses based on whole-genome comparisons place Lichenihabitantaceae within a monophyletic group of Hyphomicrobiales that also includes the families Beijerinckiaceae, Methylocystaceae, Rhodoblastaceae, and Roseiarcaceae.

Whole-genome analyses of type strains indicate that Lichenihabitans and Lichenibacterium form a well-supported monophyletic group. Broader genome and metagenome-based analyses further support inclusion of Lichenifustis within the same lineage.

Based on phylogenomic analyses, the relationships among described species are as follows:

- other Hyphomicrobiales
- - Roseiarcaceae
  - - Beijerinckiaceae
    - - Rhodoblastaceae
      - Methylocystaceae
  - - Lichenibacteriaceae Lichenibacterium
      - L. ramalinae
      - - L. minor
        - L. dinghuense
    - Lichenihabitantaceae
      - Lichenihabitans
        L. psoromatis
      - Lichenifustis
        L. flavocetrariae

Formal taxonomic emendations merging Lichenibacteriaceae into Lichenihabitantaceae have not yet been validly published.
