= Bosea minatitlanensis =

Scientific classification
- Domain: Bacteria
- Kingdom: Pseudomonadati
- Phylum: Pseudomonadota
- Class: Alphaproteobacteria
- Order: Hyphomicrobiales
- Family: Boseaceae
- Genus: Bosea
- Species: B. minatitlanensis

Binomial name
- Bosea minatitlanensis Ouattara et al. 2003

Type strain
- AMX51, ATCC 700918, CIP 106457, DSM 13099

Synonyms
- Bosea mexicana

Species of bacterium

Bosea minatitlanensis is a Gram-negative, oxidase- and catalase-positive, strictly aerobic non-spore-forming motile bacteria from the genus Bosea. It was isolated from industrial wastewater in Mexico.
