= Bosea lupini =

Scientific classification
- Domain: Bacteria
- Kingdom: Pseudomonadati
- Phylum: Pseudomonadota
- Class: Alphaproteobacteria
- Order: Hyphomicrobiales
- Family: Boseaceae
- Genus: Bosea
- Species: B. lupini

Binomial name
- Bosea lupini De Meyer and Willems 2012

Type strain
- CCUG 61248, LMG 26383, R-45681

Species of bacterium

Bosea lupini is a bacterium from the genus Bosea. Bosea lupini is an aerobic and gram-negative bacterium capable of chemolithoautotrophic growth.

== Etymology ==
The genus Bosea was named for the founder of Bose Institute (J.C. Bose), which is where Bosea thiooxidans was isolated. The botanical name of lupini comes from the genus of leguminous plants, Lupinus. The name comes from the host in which this species was first isolated from.

== Physiology and Morphology ==
Bosea lupini are rod-shaped and motile. The bacteria is gram-negative, and catalase- and oxidase-positive. Bosea lupini colonies tend to be round, smooth, and white.

== Isolation ==
Five species of Bosea were observed in various parts of Flanders, Belgium to observe the diversity of their rhizomes. The species were isolated from hospital water supplies, anaerobic digester sludge, and agricultural soil. For B. lupini in particular, it was isolated from agricultural soil. From this isolation, three species were found to be present, which included B. lupini. B. lupini was isolated from Lupinus polyphyllus.

== Growth ==
Bosea lupini growth on Lupinus polyphyllus medium (LMG medium at 155), at 25, 28, and 33 °C. The bacteria showed growth from β-glucosidase and urease processes, and the absorption of potassium gluconate. Bosea lupini did not reduce nitrate to the form of nitrite. It also formed a resistant to amoxicillin and penicillin over time. Bosea lupini had a DNA G+C content of 66.9 mol%.
