= Pseudovibrio =

Scientific classification
- Domain: Bacteria
- Kingdom: Pseudomonadati
- Phylum: Pseudomonadota
- Class: Alphaproteobacteria
- Order: Hyphomicrobiales
- Family: Stappiaceae
- Genus: Pseudovibrio; Shieh et al. 2004

Species
- Pseudovibrio ascidiaceicola Fukunaga et al. 2006; Pseudovibrio axinellae O'Halloran et al. 2013; Pseudovibrio denitrificans Shieh et al. 2004; Pseudovibrio exalbescens (Donachie et al. 2006) Hördt et al. 2020; Pseudovibrio hongkongensis Xu et al. 2015; Pseudovibrio japonicus Hosoya and Yokota 2007; Pseudovibrio stylochi Zhang et al. 2016

Synonyms
- Nesiotobacter Donachie et al. 2006; "Polycladidibacter" Hinger et al. 2020

Genus of bacteria

Pseudovibrio is a genus of bacteria in the order Hyphomicrobiales. Bacteria belonging to this genus have been often isolated from marine invertebrates and have been described to be metabolically versatile. Recent comparative genomic analyses revealed that these organisms have the genomic potential to produce a great array of systems to interact with their hosts, including type III, IV, VI secretion systems and different type of toxin-like proteins. Moreover, in their genomes several biosynthetic gene clusters producing potentially novel bioactive compounds were recently identified.
