= Amorphus (bacterium) =

Scientific classification
- Domain: Bacteria
- Kingdom: Pseudomonadati
- Phylum: Pseudomonadota
- Class: Alphaproteobacteria
- Order: Hyphomicrobiales
- Family: Amorphaceae
- Genus: Amorphus; Zeevi Ben Yosef et al. 2008

Type species
- Amorphus coralli

Species
- A. coralli A. orientalis A. suaedae

Genus of bacteria

Amorphus is a genus of bacteria from the order of Hyphomicrobiales.
