= Chelatococcus =

Scientific classification
- Domain: Bacteria
- Kingdom: Pseudomonadati
- Phylum: Pseudomonadota
- Class: Alphaproteobacteria
- Order: Hyphomicrobiales
- Family: Chelatococcaceae
- Genus: Chelatococcus; Auling et al. 1993

Type species
- Chelatococcus asaccharovorans

Species
- Chelatococcus asaccharovorans; Chelatococcus caeni; Chelatococcus daeguensis; Chelatococcus reniformis; Chelatococcus sambhunathii

Genus of bacteria

Chelatococcus is a genus of bacteria from the order Hyphomicrobiales
