= Phreatobacter cathodiphilus =

Scientific classification
- Domain: Bacteria
- Kingdom: Pseudomonadati
- Phylum: Pseudomonadota
- Class: Alphaproteobacteria
- Order: Hyphomicrobiales
- Family: Phreatobacteraceae
- Genus: Phreatobacter
- Species: P. cathodiphilus

Binomial name
- Phreatobacter cathodiphilus Kim et al. 2018

Type strain
- S-12

Species of bacterium

Phreatobacter cathodiphilus is a Gram-negative, aerobic, non-spore-forming and motile bacterium from the genus Phreatobacter.
