= Bosea eneae =

Scientific classification
- Domain: Bacteria
- Kingdom: Pseudomonadati
- Phylum: Pseudomonadota
- Class: Alphaproteobacteria
- Order: Hyphomicrobiales
- Family: Boseaceae
- Genus: Bosea
- Species: B. eneae

Binomial name
- Bosea eneae La Scola et al. 2003

Type strain
- CCUG 43111, CIP 106338, La Scola 34614, LMG 26220

Species of bacterium

Bosea eneae is a bacterium from the genus Bosea which was isolated from the water supply from the La Timone Hospital Centre in Marseille in France.
