= Chthonobacter =

Scientific classification
- Domain: Bacteria
- Kingdom: Pseudomonadati
- Phylum: Pseudomonadota
- Class: Alphaproteobacteria
- Order: Hyphomicrobiales
- Family: Pleomorphomonadaceae
- Genus: Chthonobacter; Kim et al. 2017

Species
- Chthonobacter albigriseus Kim et al. 2017; "Chthonobacter rhizosphaerae" Liu et al. 2021

Genus of bacteria

Chthonobacter is a genus of bacteria from the order Hyphomicrobiales with one valid species (Chthonobacter albigriseus).
