= Phreatobacter stygius =

Scientific classification
- Domain: Bacteria
- Kingdom: Pseudomonadati
- Phylum: Pseudomonadota
- Class: Alphaproteobacteria
- Order: Hyphomicrobiales
- Family: Phreatobacteraceae
- Genus: Phreatobacter
- Species: P. stygius

Binomial name
- Phreatobacter stygius Lee et al. 2017

Type strain
- YC6-17

Species of bacterium

Phreatobacter stygius is a Gram-negative, aerobic and motile bacterium from the genus Phreatobacter.
