= Blastochloris gulmargensis =

Scientific classification
- Domain: Bacteria
- Kingdom: Pseudomonadati
- Phylum: Pseudomonadota
- Class: Alphaproteobacteria
- Order: Hyphomicrobiales
- Family: Blastochloridaceae
- Genus: Blastochloris
- Species: B. gulmargensis'

Binomial name
- Blastochloris gulmargensis' Venkata Ramana et al. 2011

Type strain
- DSM 19786, JA248, JCM 14795

Species of bacterium

Blastochloris gulmargensis is a gram-negative, motile bacteria from the genus Blastochloris which was isolated from biofilm in a cold sulfur spring in Gulmarg in India.
