= Rhodoblastus acidophilus =

Scientific classification
- Domain: Bacteria
- Kingdom: Pseudomonadati
- Phylum: Pseudomonadota
- Class: Alphaproteobacteria
- Order: Hyphomicrobiales
- Family: Roseiarcaceae
- Genus: Rhodoblastus
- Species: R. acidophilus

Binomial name
- Rhodoblastus acidophilus (Pfennig 1969) Imhoff 2001

Species of bacterium

Rhodoblastus acidophilus, formerly known as Rhodopseudomonas acidophila, is a gram-negative purple non-sulfur bacteria. The cells are rod-shaped or ovoid, 1.0 to 1.3 μm wide and 2 to 5 μm long. They are motile by means of polar flagella, and they multiply by budding. The photopigments consist of bacteriochlorophyll a and carotenoids of the spirilloxanthin series. All strains can grow either under anaerobic conditions in the light or under microaerophilic to aerobic conditions in the dark.
