= Bosea robiniae =

Scientific classification
- Domain: Bacteria
- Kingdom: Pseudomonadati
- Phylum: Pseudomonadota
- Class: Alphaproteobacteria
- Order: Hyphomicrobiales
- Family: Boseaceae
- Genus: Bosea
- Species: B. robiniae

Binomial name
- Bosea robiniae Ouattara et al. 2003

Type strain
- CCUG 61249, De Meyer R-46070, LMG 26381, R-46070

Species of bacterium

Bosea robiniae is a bacterium from the genus of Bosea.
