= Bosea massiliensis =

Scientific classification
- Domain: Bacteria
- Kingdom: Pseudomonadati
- Phylum: Pseudomonadota
- Class: Alphaproteobacteria
- Order: Hyphomicrobiales
- Family: Boseaceae
- Genus: Bosea
- Species: B. massiliensis

Binomial name
- Bosea massiliensis La Scola et al. 2003

Type strain
- 63287, CCUG 43117, CIP 106336

Species of bacterium

Bosea massiliensis is a bacterium from the genus Bosea which was isolated in Marseille in France.
