= Saliniramus fredricksonii =

Scientific classification
- Domain: Bacteria
- Kingdom: Pseudomonadati
- Phylum: Pseudomonadota
- Class: Alphaproteobacteria
- Order: Hyphomicrobiales
- Family: Salinarimonadaceae
- Genus: Saliniramus; Cole et al. 2018
- Species: S. fredricksonii

Binomial name
- Saliniramus fredricksonii Cole et al. 2018

Synonyms
- Salinivirga fredricksonii Cole et al. 2018

Species of bacteria

Saliniramus fredricksonii is a species of bacteria from the order of Hyphomicrobiales.
