= Bosea thiooxidans =

Scientific classification
- Domain: Bacteria
- Kingdom: Pseudomonadati
- Phylum: Pseudomonadota
- Class: Alphaproteobacteria
- Order: Hyphomicrobiales
- Family: Boseaceae
- Genus: Bosea
- Species: B. thiooxidans

Binomial name
- Bosea thiooxidans Das et al. 1996

Species of bacterium

Bosea thiooxidans is a gram-negative species of bacteria that oxidises thiosulfate, the type species of its genus. Its type strain is BI-42.
