= Rhodobiaceae =

Scientific classification
- Domain: Bacteria
- Kingdom: Pseudomonadati
- Phylum: Pseudomonadota
- Class: Alphaproteobacteria
- Order: Hyphomicrobiales
- Family: Rhodobiaceae; Garrity et al. 2006

Genera
- Afifella; Anderseniella; Butyratibacter; Lutibaculum; Parvibaculum; Rhodobium; Rhodoligotrophos; Roseospirillum; Tepidamorphus; Tepidicaulis

Family of bacteria

The Rhodobiaceae are a family of bacteria.
