= Bosea vaviloviae =

Scientific classification
- Domain: Bacteria
- Kingdom: Pseudomonadati
- Phylum: Pseudomonadota
- Class: Alphaproteobacteria
- Order: Hyphomicrobiales
- Family: Boseaceae
- Genus: Bosea
- Species: B. vaviloviae

Binomial name
- Bosea vaviloviae Safronova et al. 2015

Type strain
- Vaf-17, Vaf-18, Vaf-43, LMG 28367, RCAM 02129

Species of bacterium

Bosea vaviloviae is a Gram-negative and rod-shaped bacterium from the genus Bosea which has been isolated from the nodules of the plant Vavilovia formosa.
