= Ancalomicrobium =

Scientific classification
- Domain: Bacteria
- Kingdom: Pseudomonadati
- Phylum: Pseudomonadota
- Class: Alphaproteobacteria
- Order: Hyphomicrobiales
- Family: Ancalomicrobiaceae
- Genus: Ancalomicrobium; Staley 1968
- Species: A. adetum

Binomial name
- Ancalomicrobium adetum Staley 1968

Type strain
- 4a:2, ATCC 23632, DSM 4722, IAM 14882, JCM 21375, NBRC 102456, NCIMB 12776, VKM B-1375

Genus of bacteria

Ancalomicrobium is a genus of bacteria from the order Hyphomicrobiales. The only species is Ancalomicrobium adetum. It was isolated from freshwater creek.
