= Aestuariivirga =

Scientific classification
- Domain: Bacteria
- Kingdom: Pseudomonadati
- Phylum: Pseudomonadota
- Class: Alphaproteobacteria
- Order: Hyphomicrobiales
- Family: Aestuariivirgaceae
- Genus: Aestuariivirga; Li et al. 2019
- Species: A. litoralis

Binomial name
- Aestuariivirga litoralis Li et al. 2019

Genus of bacteria

Aestuariivirga litoralis is a species of Alphaproteobacteria. It is the only species in the genus Aestuariivirga.
