= Roseibium =

Scientific classification
- Domain: Bacteria
- Kingdom: Pseudomonadati
- Phylum: Pseudomonadota
- Class: Alphaproteobacteria
- Order: Hyphomicrobiales
- Family: Stappiaceae
- Genus: Roseibium; Suzuki et al. 2000

Species
- Roseibium aestuarii Duan et al. 2020; Roseibium aggregatum (Uchino et al. 1999) Hördt et al. 2020; Roseibium album (Pujalte et al. 2006) Hördt et al. 2020; Roseibium alexandrii (Biebl et al. 2007) Hördt et al. 2020; Roseibium aquae Zhong et al. 2014; "Roseibium callyspongiae" Liu et al. 2021; Roseibium denhamense Suzuki et al. 2000; Roseibium hamelinense Suzuki et al. 2000; Roseibium litorale Liu et al. 2021; Roseibium marinum (Kim et al. 2006) Hördt et al. 2020; Roseibium polysiphoniae (Romanenko et al. 2019) Liu et al. 2021; Roseibium salinum (Camacho et al. 2016) Hördt et al. 2020; Roseibium sediminis Liu et al. 2017; Roseibium suaedae (Bibi et al. 2014) Hördt et al. 2020

Synonyms
- Labrenzia Biebl et al. 2007

Genus of bacteria

Roseibium is a genus of bacteria in the order Hyphomicrobiales.
