= Tepidamorphaceae =

Scientific classification
- Domain: Bacteria
- Kingdom: Pseudomonadati
- Phylum: Pseudomonadota
- Class: Alphaproteobacteria
- Order: Hyphomicrobiales
- Family: Tepidamorphaceae; Hördt et al. 2020

Genera
- Butyratibacter Wang et al. 2017; Lutibaculum Anil Kumar et al. 2012; Microbaculum Su et al. 2017; Tepidamorphus Albuquerque et al. 2010

Synonyms
- "Lutibaculaceae" Yarza et al. 2014

Family of bacteria

Tepidamorphaceae is a family of Alphaproteobacteria.

== Phylogeny ==
The currently accepted taxonomy is based on the List of Prokaryotic names with Standing in Nomenclature (LPSN). The phylogeny is based on whole-genome analysis.

- - Tepidamorphaceae
    - Lutibaculum
    - - Butyratibacter
      - - Microbaculum
        - Tepidamorphus
  - outgroup
    Kaistiaceae
