= Oharaeibacter =

Scientific classification
- Domain: Bacteria
- Kingdom: Pseudomonadati
- Phylum: Pseudomonadota
- Class: Alphaproteobacteria
- Order: Hyphomicrobiales
- Family: Pleomorphomonadaceae
- Genus: Oharaeibacter; Lv et al. 2017

Species
- O. diazotrophicus

Genus of bacteria

Oharaeibacter is a genus of bacteria from the family of Methylocystaceae with one known species (Oharaeibacter diazotrophicus).
