= Lichenihabitans =

Scientific classification
- Domain: Bacteria
- Kingdom: Pseudomonadati
- Phylum: Pseudomonadota
- Class: Alphaproteobacteria
- Order: Hyphomicrobiales
- Family: Lichenihabitantaceae
- Genus: Lichenihabitans; Noh et al. 2019
- Species: L. psoromatis

Binomial name
- Lichenihabitans psoromatis Noh et al. 2019

Family of bacteria

Lichenihabitans psoromatis is a species of Alphaproteobacteria. It is the only species in the genus Lichenihabitans.
