= Tepidamorphus =

Scientific classification
- Domain: Bacteria
- Kingdom: Pseudomonadati
- Phylum: Pseudomonadota
- Class: Alphaproteobacteria
- Order: Hyphomicrobiales
- Family: Tepidamorphaceae
- Genus: Tepidamorphus; Albuquerque et al. 2010

Type species
- Tepidamorphus gemmatus

Species
- T. gemmatus

Genus of bacteria

Tepidamorphus is a genus of bacteria from the order Hyphomicrobiales.
