= Blastochloris =

Scientific classification
- Domain: Bacteria
- Kingdom: Pseudomonadati
- Phylum: Pseudomonadota
- Class: Alphaproteobacteria
- Order: Hyphomicrobiales
- Family: Blastochloridaceae; Hördt et al. 2020
- Genus: Blastochloris; Hiraishi 1997

Type species
- Blastochloris viridis

Species
- Blastochloris gulmargensis Venkata Ramana et al. 2011; Blastochloris sulfoviridis (Keppen and Gorlenko 1975) Hiraishi 1997; Blastochloris tepida Madigan et al. 2020; Blastochloris viridis (Drews and Giesbrecht 1966) Hiraishi 1997

Genus of bacteria

Blastochloris is a genus of bacteria from the order Hyphomicrobiales.
