= Pseudoxanthobacter =

Scientific classification
- Domain: Bacteria
- Kingdom: Pseudomonadati
- Phylum: Pseudomonadota
- Class: Alphaproteobacteria
- Order: Hyphomicrobiales
- Family: Pseudoxanthobacteraceae; Hördt et al. 2020
- Genus: Pseudoxanthobacter; Arun et al. 2008

Type species
- Pseudoxanthobacter soli Arun et al. 2008

Species
- Pseudoxanthobacter liyangensis; Pseudoxanthobacter soli

Genus of bacteria

Pseudoxanthobacter is a genus of Gram-negative, rod-shaped, aerobic and nitrogen-fixing bacteria in the family Pseudoxanthobacteraceae.
