= Bosea (bacterium) =

Scientific classification
- Domain: Bacteria
- Kingdom: Pseudomonadati
- Phylum: Pseudomonadota
- Class: Alphaproteobacteria
- Order: Hyphomicrobiales
- Family: Boseaceae; Hördt et al. 2020
- Genus: Bosea; Das et al. 1996

Type species
- Bosea thiooxidans

Species
- Bosea caraganae Sazanova et al. 2019; Bosea eneae La Scola et al. 2003; Bosea lathyri De Meyer and Willems 2012; Bosea lupini De Meyer and Willems 2012; Bosea massiliensis La Scola et al. 2003; Bosea minatitlanensis Ouattara et al. 2003; Bosea psychrotolerans Albert et al. 2019; Bosea robiniae De Meyer and Willems 2012; Bosea thiooxidans Das et al. 1996; Bosea vaviloviae Safronova et al. 2015; Bosea vestrisii La Scola et al. 2003

Genus of bacteria

Bosea is a genus of bacteria from the order Hyphomicrobiales.
