= Parvibaculum =

Scientific classification
- Domain: Bacteria
- Kingdom: Pseudomonadati
- Phylum: Pseudomonadota
- Class: Alphaproteobacteria
- Order: Hyphomicrobiales
- Family: Parvibaculaceae
- Genus: Parvibaculum; Schleheck et al. 2004

Type species
- Parvibaculum lavamentivorans

Species
- Parvibaculum hydrocarboniclasticum Rosario-Passapera et al. 2012; Parvibaculum indicum Lai et al. 2011; Parvibaculum lavamentivorans Schleheck et al. 2004; "Parvibaculum sedimenti" Wang et al. 2020

Genus of bacteria

Parvibaculum is a genus of bacteria from the family Parvibaculaceae.
