= Alsobacter =

Scientific classification
- Domain: Bacteria
- Kingdom: Pseudomonadati
- Phylum: Pseudomonadota
- Class: Alphaproteobacteria
- Order: Hyphomicrobiales
- Family: Alsobacteraceae; Sun et al. 2018
- Genus: Alsobacter; Bao et al. 2014

Genera
- Alsobacter metallidurans Bao et al. 2014; Alsobacter soli Sun et al. 2018

Family of bacteria

Alsobacter is a genus of Alphaproteobacteria.
