= Mongoliimonas =

Scientific classification
- Domain: Bacteria
- Kingdom: Pseudomonadati
- Phylum: Pseudomonadota
- Class: Alphaproteobacteria
- Order: Hyphomicrobiales
- Family: Pleomorphomonadaceae
- Genus: Mongoliimonas; Xi et al. 2017
- Species: M. terrestris

Binomial name
- Mongoliimonas terrestris Xi et al. 2017

Genus of bacteria

Mongoliimonas terrestris is a species of bacteria. It is the only species in the genus Mongoliimonas.
