= Phreatobacter =

Scientific classification
- Domain: Bacteria
- Kingdom: Pseudomonadati
- Phylum: Pseudomonadota
- Class: Alphaproteobacteria
- Order: Hyphomicrobiales
- Family: Phreatobacteraceae; Hördt et al. 2020
- Genus: Phreatobacter; Tóth et al. 2014

Species
- Phreatobacter cathodiphilus Kim et al. 2018; Phreatobacter oligotrophus Tóth et al. 2014; Phreatobacter stygius Lee et al. 2017; Phreatobacter aquiterrae Cozannet et al. 2026

Genus of bacteria

Phreatobacter is a genus of bacteria from the class Alphaproteobacteria.
