= Lar1 =

Class of bacteria

LAR1 ('Lichen-Associated Rhizobiales 1') refers to a specific bacterial lineage in the order Hyphomicrobiales (formerly Rhizobiales) that has most frequently been found directly in association with lichens.

This lineage is currently known to associate with lichens that have a green-algal photosynthetic partner (as opposed to a cyanobacterial partner) and a fungal partner in the Lecanoromycetes (though other groups of fungi have not yet been examined). This lineage has been documented in association with all green-algal lichens specifically tested (all from North America), and was also found in a sequence library derived from Antarctic lichens. The specific ecological niche occupied by this lineage indicates that it may rely on certain nutrients that are abundant in green-algal lichen thalli but are rarer in other environments.

== Nitrogen fixing ==
The LAR1 lineage is currently defined based on sequences of the 16S rRNA gene alone, since it remains uncultured in the laboratory. In spite of its resistance to being cultured, at least one potentially significant metabolic function can be inferred through circumstantial evidence: nitrogen fixation. Since nitrogen is required for growth by all biological systems, but is generally biologically inaccessible due to its high activation energy, many eukaryotes have established relationships with specialized bacteria that are capable of nitrogen fixation (converting dinitrogen gas into a molecular form which is easily assimilated).

Many lichens grow in extremely nutrient-poor environments and may rely on nitrogen-fixing bacteria to provide them with enough molecular nitrogen to survive. It has been documented by numerous researchers that microbes associated with green-algal lichens have the potential to fix nitrogen in abundance.

However, nearly all of these studies have relied solely on culture-based methods, which may provide an inaccurate picture of what the most abundant or important nitrogen-fixers are. Independent studies on lichens have used culture-free techniques to detect the presence of nifH, the primary gene involved in nitrogen fixation, and have uncovered sequences that share the same phylogenetic affinities as the LAR1 lineage.

However, the diversity of bacteria found in environmental samples, the frequency with which horizontal gene transfer occurs in bacteria, and the lack of physiological studies make a definitive statement regarding the metabolic activity of this uncultured lineage impossible at this point.
