= Notoacmeibacteraceae =

Scientific classification
- Domain: Bacteria
- Kingdom: Pseudomonadati
- Phylum: Pseudomonadota
- Class: Alphaproteobacteria
- Order: Hyphomicrobiales
- Family: Notoacmeibacteraceae; Huang et al. 2017

Genera
- Notoacmeibacter Huang et al. 2017; Zhengella Liao et al. 2018

Synonyms
- Mabikibacteraceae Choi et al. 2017

Family of bacteria

Notoacmeibacteraceae is a family of bacteria.
