= Breoghania =

Scientific classification
- Domain: Bacteria
- Kingdom: Pseudomonadati
- Phylum: Pseudomonadota
- Class: Alphaproteobacteria
- Order: Hyphomicrobiales
- Family: Breoghaniaceae; Hördt et al. 2020
- Genus: Breoghania; Gallego et al. 2011
- Species: B. corrubedonensis

Binomial name
- Breoghania corrubedonensis Gallego et al. 2011

Genus of bacteria

Breoghania is a Gram-negative genus of bacteria from the order of Hyphomicrobiales with one known species (Breoghania corrubedonensis). Breoghania corrubedonensis has been isolated from beach sand which was contaminated with oil from Corrubedo in Spain.
