= Ancalomicrobiaceae =

Scientific classification
- Domain: Bacteria
- Kingdom: Pseudomonadati
- Phylum: Pseudomonadota
- Class: Alphaproteobacteria
- Order: Hyphomicrobiales
- Family: Ancalomicrobiaceae; Dahal et al. 2018

Genera
- Ancalomicrobium Staley 1968 (Approved Lists 1980); Pinisolibacter Dahal et al. 2018; Siculibacillus Felföldi et al. 2019

Family of bacteria

Ancalomicrobiaceae is a family of Alphaproteobacteria.
