= Afifella =

Scientific classification
- Domain: Bacteria
- Kingdom: Pseudomonadati
- Phylum: Pseudomonadota
- Class: Alphaproteobacteria
- Order: Hyphomicrobiales
- Family: Afifellaceae; Hördt et al. 2020
- Genus: Afifella; Urdiain et al. 2009

Species
- Afifella aestuarii Buddhi et al. 2020; Afifella marina (Imhoff 1984) Urdiain et al. 2009; Afifella pfennigii (Caumette et al. 2007) Urdiain et al. 2009

Genus of bacteria

Afifella is a genus in the phylum Pseudomonadota (Bacteria). Afifella are found in marine and estuarine settings, including microbial mats. They are anaerobes, with one cultured representative capable of photosynthesis.

== Etymology ==
The generic name Afifella derives from S. Afif, British philosopher and painter, in recognition of his expertise and guidance in the subject of the philosophical tendency of structuralism, essential for the development and understanding of taxonomy as a science.

== Species ==
The genus contains three species:

- Afifella marina (Latin marina meaning "marine"), was previously known as Rhodobium marinum and before that as Rhodopseudomonas marina.
- Afifella pfennigii (Neo-Latin pfennigii, of Pfennig, named after Norbert Pfennig, a German microbiologist) was previously known as Rhodobium pfennigii.
- Afifella aestuarii Buddhi et al. 2020

== Morphology and physiology ==
Afifella marina is an anaerobe that produces hydrogen. A. pfennigii is a motile, rod shaped, gram stain negative cell with a length of 1-2 μm and a width of 0.6 μm. A. aestuarii is a motile, oval or rod-shaped, gram-stain-negative, oxidase-positive, catalase-negative, pink-coloured phototrophic bacteria.

== Isolation ==
The three species of Afifella were isolated from coastal waters. A. marina was isolated from marine sponges on the Adriatic shore. A. pfennigii was isolated from a benthic microbial mat from a brackish pond located on the Rangiroa atoll in the Tuamotu islands near Australia. A. aestuarii was isolated from an estuary near Pata, Gujarat, India.

== Culture and Growth ==
Afifella marina growth on a rhodospirillaceae medium (DSMZ Medium 27), at 25 °C, with 3% NaCl, and is anaerobic in light. A. pfennigii growth on a (DSMZ Medium 27), at 28 °C, supplemented with 1% NaCl and 0.15% NaHCO_{3}, and is anaerobic in light. A. aestuarii requires thiamine to grow and is the only Afifella isolate capable of photolithoautotrophic, photoorganoheterotrophic and chemoorganoheterotrophic growth modes.

== Genome sequencing ==
Afifella marina is designated as strain DSM 2698^{T} and has a GC content of 63.8 mol%. A. pfennigii is designated as strain DSM17143^{T} and has a GC content of 63.8 mol%. A. aestuarii is designated as strain JA968^{T} and has a GC content of 63.5 mol%. A comparison of the 16rRNA gene sequences showed that A. aestuarii strain JA968T was very similar to A. marina strain DSM 2698^{T} at 99.9% similarity and A. pfennigii strain DSM17143^{T} at 98.4% similarity.
