= Dunes of Corrubedo Natural Park =

- Galician Dunas de Corrubedo e Lagoas de Carregal e Vixán
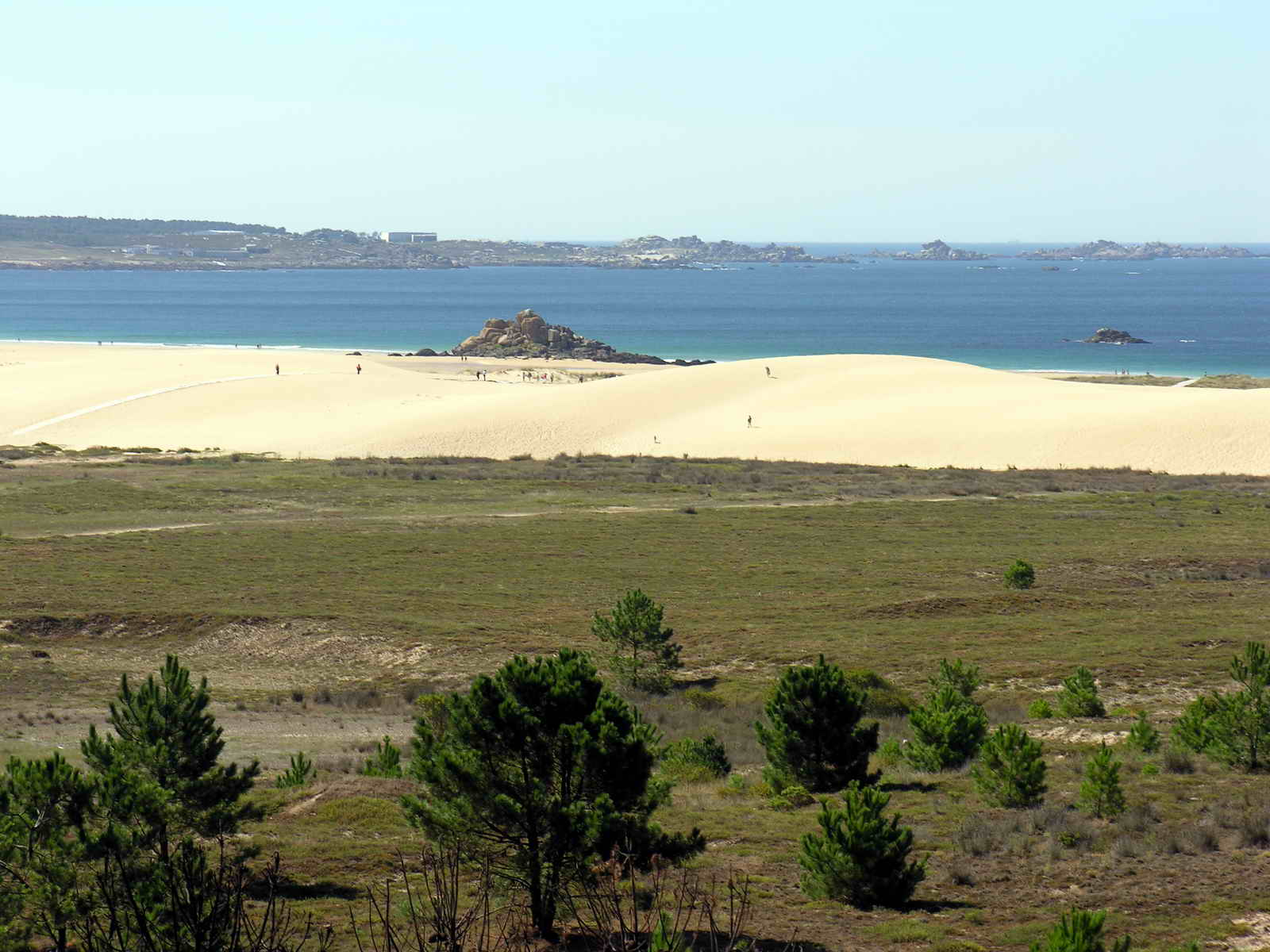
- Interactive map of Dunes of Corrubedo Natural Park
- Coordinates: 42°33′N 09°02′W
- Established: 1992
- Governing body: Xunta de Galicia

Ramsar Wetland
- Official name: Complejo de Corrubedo
- Designated: 26 March 1993
- Reference no.: 598

Dunes of Corrubedo Natural Park (Galician: Dunas de Corrubedo e Lagoas de Carregal e Vixán) is a 4 square miles (10 km^{2}) natural park on the Atlantic coast of Spain. It is one of six natural parks in the autonomous community of Galicia. It is situated at the very end of the A Barbanza Peninsula in the province of A Coruña.

== Conservation ==
The natural park was designated in 1992. Its international importance as a wetland was recognised the following year, when it became a Ramsar site.

The natural park is an important site for bird-life and the European Union has included it within a Special Protection Area.

== Gallery ==
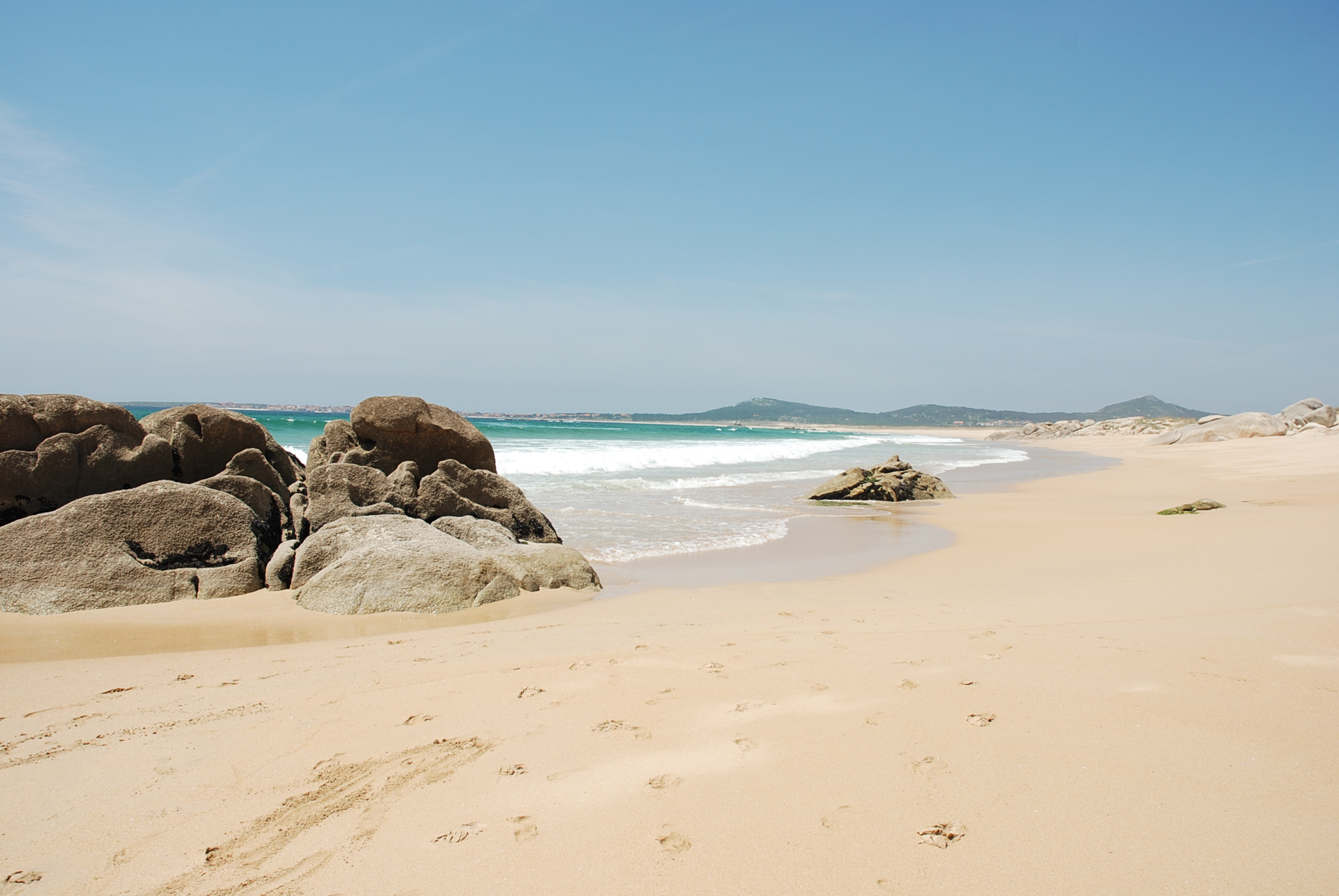

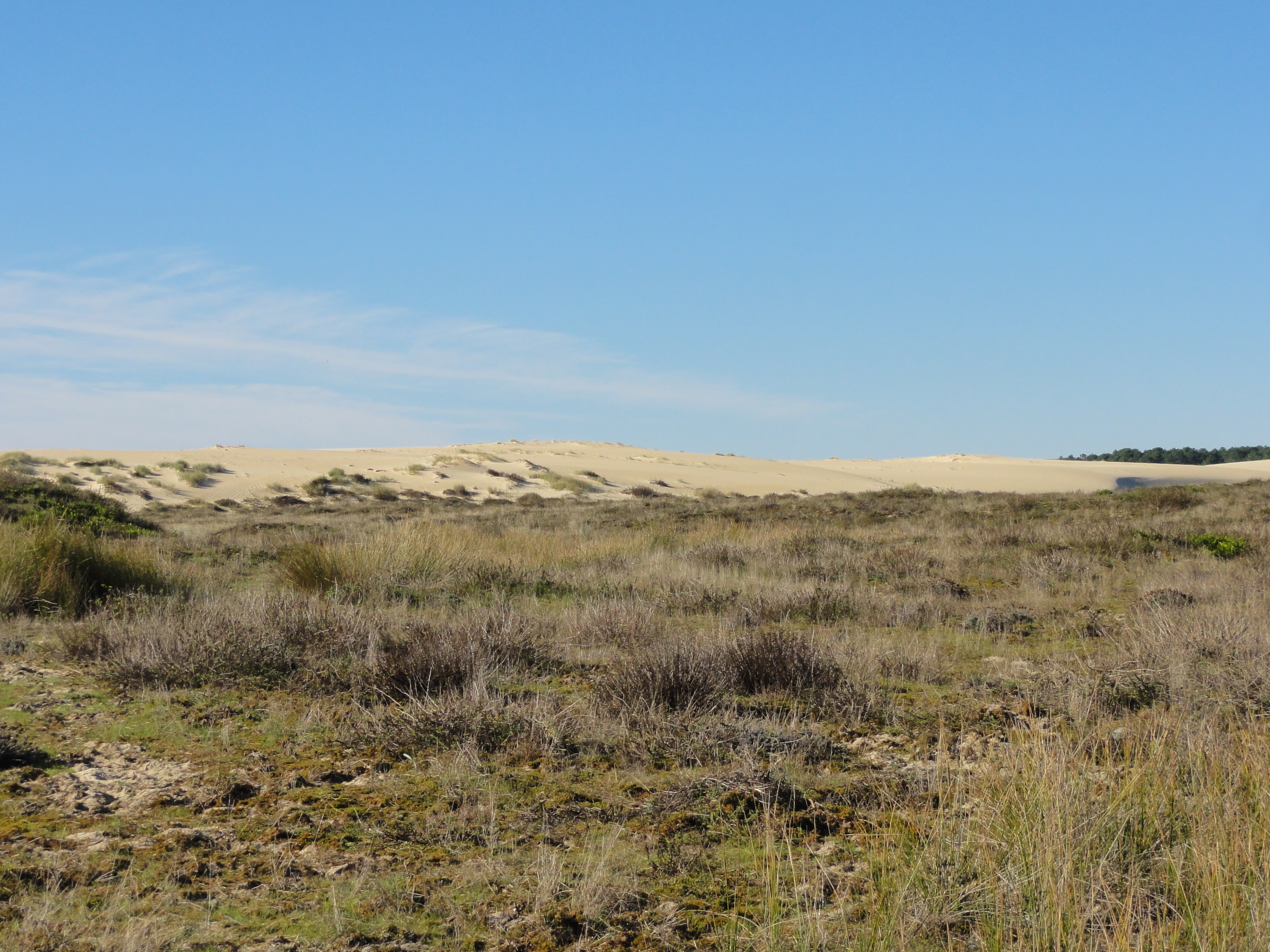

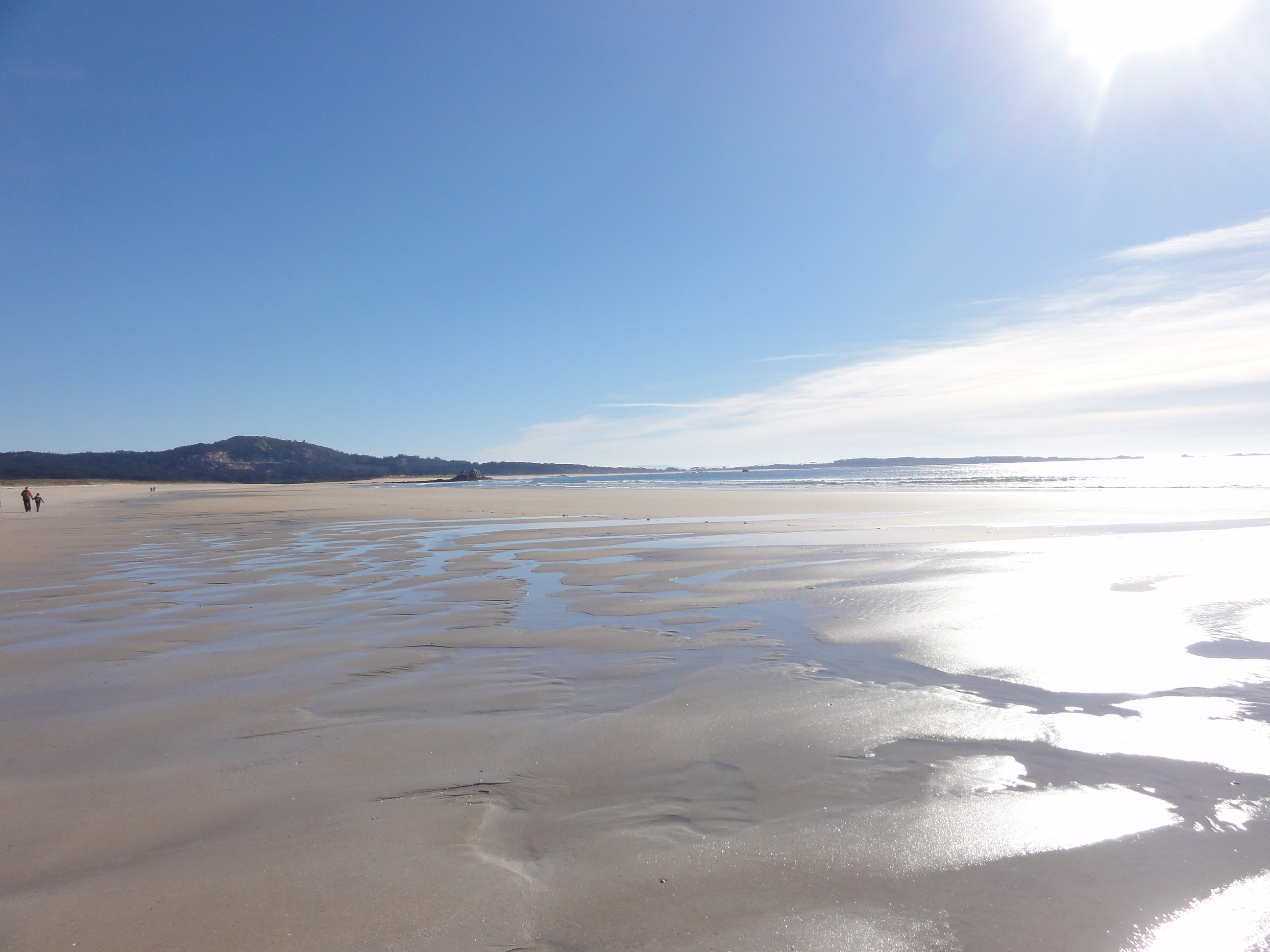

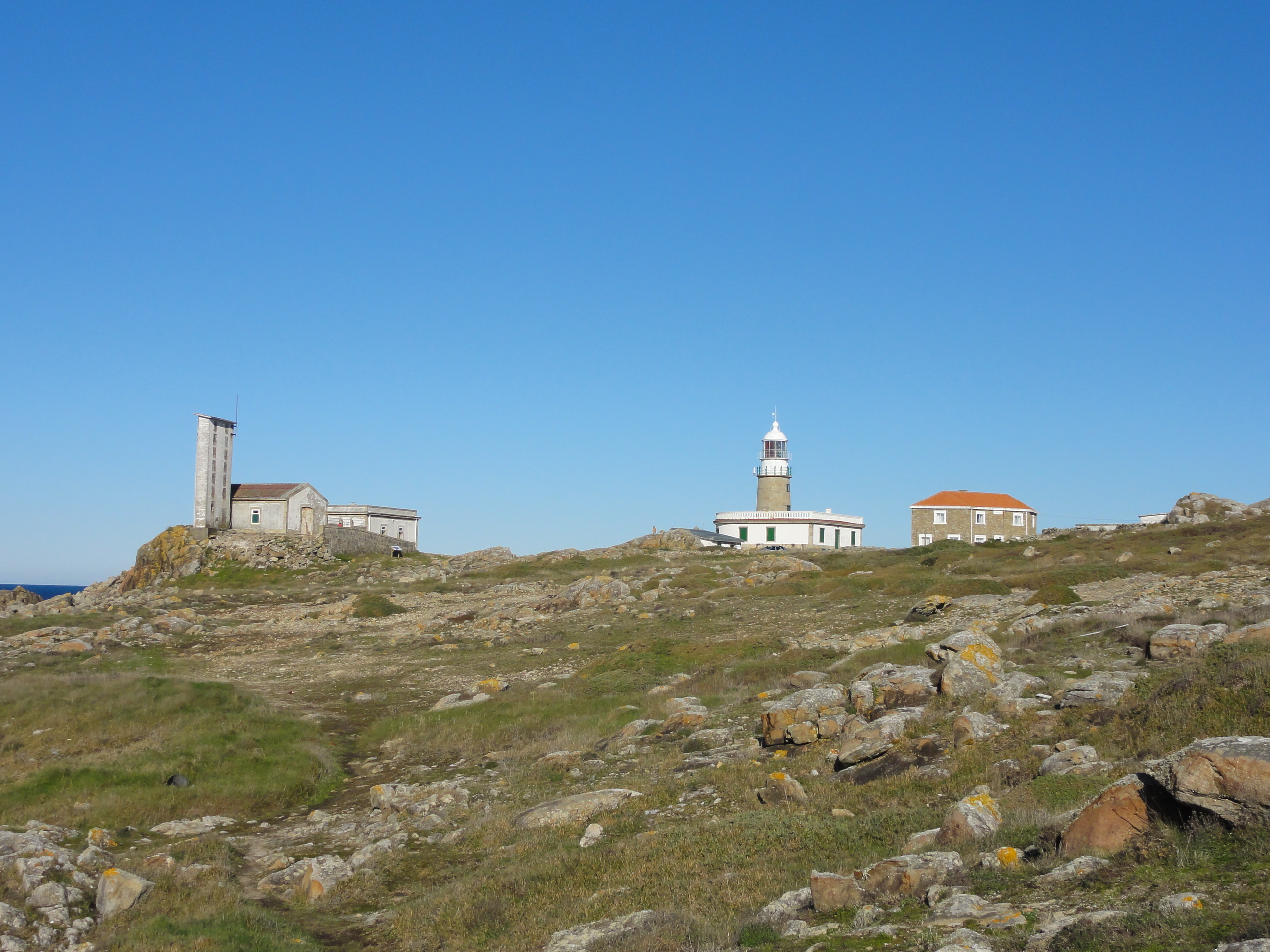

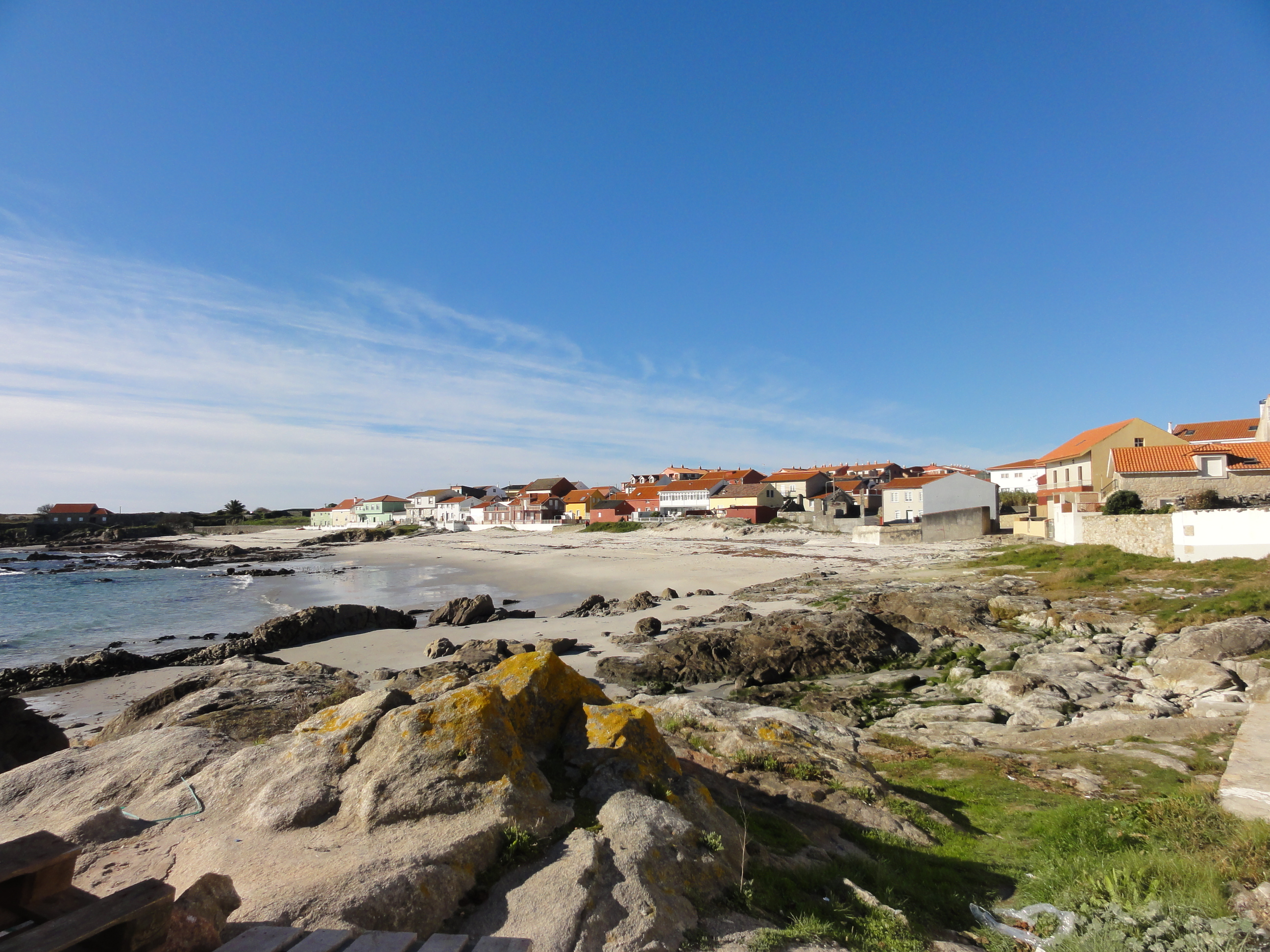

== See also ==
- Conservation movement
- United Nations Environment Programme
