= Salinarimonadaceae =

Scientific classification
- Domain: Bacteria
- Kingdom: Pseudomonadati
- Phylum: Pseudomonadota
- Class: Alphaproteobacteria
- Order: Hyphomicrobiales
- Family: Salinarimonadaceae; Cole et al. 2018

Genera
- Salinarimonas Liu et al. 2010; Saliniramus Cole et al. 2018

Family of bacteria

Salinarimonadaceae is a family of Alphaproteobacteria.
