= Amorphaceae =

Scientific classification
- Domain: Bacteria
- Kingdom: Pseudomonadati
- Phylum: Pseudomonadota
- Class: Alphaproteobacteria
- Order: Hyphomicrobiales
- Family: Amorphaceae; Hördt et al. 2020

Genera
- Acuticoccus Hou et al. 2017; Amorphus Zeevi Ben Yosef et al. 2008

Synonyms
- "Acuticoccaceae" Lai et al. 2019

Family of bacteria

Amorphaceae is a family of Alphaproteobacteria.
