= Parvibaculaceae =

Scientific classification
- Domain: Bacteria
- Kingdom: Pseudomonadati
- Phylum: Pseudomonadota
- Class: Alphaproteobacteria
- Order: Hyphomicrobiales
- Family: Parvibaculaceae; Hördt et al. 2020

Genera
- Anderseniella Brettar et al. 2007; Parvibaculum Schleheck et al. 2004; "Candidatus Phaeomarinobacter" Dittami et al. 2014; Pyruvatibacter Wang et al. 2016; Rhodoligotrophos Fukuda et al. 2012; Tepidicaulis Takeuchi et al. 2015

Synonyms
- "Candidatus Phaeomarinobacteraceae" Dittami et al. 2014

Family of bacteria

Parvibaculaceae is a family of Alphaproteobacteria.

== Phylogeny ==
The currently accepted taxonomy is based on the List of Prokaryotic names with Standing in Nomenclature (LPSN). The phylogeny is based on whole-genome analysis.

- - Parvibaculaceae
    - - Pyruvatibacter
      - - Parvibaculum
        - Tepidicaulis
    - - Anderseniella
      - Rhodoligotrophos
  - outgroup
    Hyphomicrobiaceae
