= Roseiarcaceae =

Scientific classification
- Domain: Bacteria
- Kingdom: Pseudomonadati
- Phylum: Pseudomonadota
- Class: Alphaproteobacteria
- Order: Hyphomicrobiales
- Family: Roseiarcaceae; Kulichevskaya et al. 2014

Genera
- Rhodoblastus Imhoff 2001; Roseiarcus Kulichevskaya et al. 2014

Family of bacteria

Roseiarcaceae is a family of Alphaproteobacteria.
