= Stappiaceae =

Scientific classification
- Domain: Bacteria
- Kingdom: Pseudomonadati
- Phylum: Pseudomonadota
- Class: Alphaproteobacteria
- Order: Hyphomicrobiales
- Family: Stappiaceae; Hördt et al. 2020

Genera
- "Hongsoonwoonella" Lee et al. 2021; Pannonibacter Borsodi et al. 2003; Pseudovibrio Shieh et al. 2004; Roseibium Suzuki et al. 2000; Stappia Uchino et al. 1999

Synonyms
- "Stappiaceae" Yarza et al. 2014

Family of bacteria

Stappiaceae is a family of Alphaproteobacteria.

== Phylogeny ==
The currently accepted taxonomy is based on the List of Prokaryotic names with Standing in Nomenclature (LPSN). The phylogeny is based on whole-genome analysis.

- - Stappiaceae
    - Pseudovibrio
    - - Stappia
      - - Pannonibacter
        - Roseibium
  - outgroup
    Breoghaniaceae
