= Pleomorphomonadaceae =

Scientific classification
- Domain: Bacteria
- Kingdom: Pseudomonadati
- Phylum: Pseudomonadota
- Class: Alphaproteobacteria
- Order: Hyphomicrobiales
- Family: Pleomorphomonadaceae; Hördt et al. 2020

Genera
- Chthonobacter Kim et al. 2017; Hartmannibacter Suarez et al. 2014; Methylobrevis Poroshina et al. 2015; Mongoliimonas Xi et al. 2017; Oharaeibacter Lv et al. 2017; Pleomorphomonas Xie and Yokota 2005

Synonyms
- "Pleomorphomonadaceae" Yarza et al. 2014

Family of bacteria

Pleomorphomonadaceae is a family of Alphaproteobacteria.

== Phylogeny ==
The currently accepted taxonomy is based on the List of Prokaryotic names with Standing in Nomenclature (LPSN). The phylogeny is based on whole-genome analysis.

- - Pleomorphomonadaceae
    - - Hartmannibacter
      - Methylobrevis
    - - - - Mongoliimonas
          - Chthonobacter
        - Oharaeibacter
      - Pleomorphomonas
  - outgroup
    Prosthecomicrobium
