= Chelatococcaceae =

Scientific classification
- Domain: Bacteria
- Kingdom: Pseudomonadati
- Phylum: Pseudomonadota
- Class: Alphaproteobacteria
- Order: Hyphomicrobiales
- Family: Chelatococcaceae; Dedysh et al. 2016

Genera
- Camelimonas Kämpfer et al. 2010; Chelatococcus Auling et al. 1993

Family of bacteria

Chelatococcaceae is a family of Alphaproteobacteria.
