= Kaistiaceae =

Scientific classification
- Domain: Bacteria
- Kingdom: Pseudomonadati
- Phylum: Pseudomonadota
- Class: Alphaproteobacteria
- Order: Hyphomicrobiales
- Family: Kaistiaceae; Hördt et al. 2020

Genera
- Bauldia Yee et al. 2010; Kaistia Im et al. 2005

Synonyms
- "Kaistiaceae" Yarza et al. 2014

Family of bacteria

Kaistiaceae is a family of Alphaproteobacteria.
