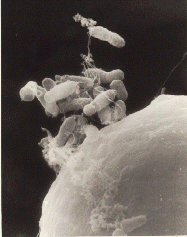
- Agrobacterium (SEM image)

Scientific classification
- Domain: Bacteria
- Kingdom: Pseudomonadati
- Phylum: Pseudomonadota
- Class: Alphaproteobacteria
- Order: Hyphomicrobiales; Douglas 1957 (Approved Lists 1980)

Families
- See text

Synonyms
- Rhizobiales Kuykendall 2006

= Hyphomicrobiales =

Order of bacteria

The Hyphomicrobiales (synonym Rhizobiales) are an order of Gram-negative Alphaproteobacteria.

The rhizobia, which fix nitrogen and are symbiotic with plant roots, appear in several different families. The four families Nitrobacteraceae, Hyphomicrobiaceae, Phyllobacteriaceae, and Rhizobiaceae contain at least several genera of nitrogen-fixing, legume-nodulating, microsymbiotic bacteria. Examples are the genera Bradyrhizobium and Rhizobium. Species of the Methylocystaceae are methanotrophs; they use methanol (CH_{3}OH) or methane (CH_{4}) as their sole energy and carbon sources. Other important genera are the human pathogens Bartonella and Brucella, as well as Agrobacterium, an important tool in genetic engineering.

== Taxonomy ==
=== Accepted families ===
- Aestuariivirgaceae Li et al. 2019
- Afifellaceae Hördt et al. 2020
- Ahrensiaceae Hördt et al. 2020
- Alsobacteraceae Sun et al. 2018
- Amorphaceae Hördt et al. 2020
- Ancalomicrobiaceae Dahal et al. 2018
- Aurantimonadaceae Hördt et al. 2020
- Bartonellaceae Gieszczykiewicz 1939 (Approved Lists 1980)
- Beijerinckiaceae Garrity et al. 2006
- Blastochloridaceae Hördt et al. 2020
- Boseaceae Hördt et al. 2020
- Breoghaniaceae Hördt et al. 2020
- Brucellaceae Breed et al. 1957 (Approved Lists 1980)
- Chelatococcaceae Dedysh et al. 2016
- Cohaesibacteraceae Hwang and Cho 2008
- Devosiaceae Hördt et al. 2020
- Hyphomicrobiaceae Babudieri 1950 (Approved Lists 1980)
- Kaistiaceae Hördt et al. 2020
- Lichenibacteriaceae Pankratov et al. 2020
- Lichenihabitantaceae Noh et al. 2019
- Methylobacteriaceae Garrity et al. 2006
- Methylocystaceae Bowman 2006
- Nitrobacteraceae corrig. Buchanan 1917 (Approved Lists 1980)
- Notoacmeibacteraceae Huang et al. 2017
- Parvibaculaceae Hördt et al. 2020
- Phreatobacteraceae Hördt et al. 2020
- Phyllobacteriaceae Mergaert and Swings 2006
- Pleomorphomonadaceae Hördt et al. 2020
- Pseudoxanthobacteraceae Hördt et al. 2020
- Rhabdaerophilaceae Ming et al. 2020
- Rhizobiaceae Conn 1938 (Approved Lists 1980)
- Rhodobiaceae Garrity et al. 2006
- Roseiarcaceae Kulichevskaya et al. 2014
- Salinarimonadaceae Cole et al. 2018
- Segnochrobactraceae Akter et al. 2020
- Stappiaceae Hördt et al. 2020
- Tepidamorphaceae Hördt et al. 2020
- Xanthobacteraceae Lee et al. 2005

=== Unassigned genera ===
The following genus has not been assigned to a family:

- Flaviflagellibacter Dong et al. 2019

=== Provisional taxa ===
These taxa have been published, but have not been validated according to the Bacteriological Code:

- "Nordella" La Scola et al. 2004
- "Propylenellaceae" Liu et al. 2021
  - "Propylenella" Liu et al. 2021
    - "Propylenella binzhouense" Liu et al. 2021
- "Thermopetrobacter" Sislak 2013

== Phylogeny ==
The currently accepted taxonomy is based on the List of Prokaryotic names with Standing in Nomenclature and the phylogeny is based on whole-genome sequences. (Note: Aestuariivirgaceae, Alsobacteraceae, Ancalomicrobiaceae, Lichenibacteriaceae, Lichenihabitantaceae, Rhabdaerophilaceae, and Segnochrobactraceae are not included in this phylogenetic tree.)

- - Hyphomicrobiales
    - Parvibaculaceae
    - - Hyphomicrobiaceae
      - - - - Amorphaceae
            - - - Rhodobiaceae
                - Afifellaceae
              - - Cohaesibacteraceae
                - - Breoghaniaceae
                  - Stappiaceae
          - - Devosiaceae
            - - Aurantimonadaceae
              - - - - Ahrensiaceae
                    - - Notoacmeibacteraceae
                      - Phyllobacteriaceae
                  - Rhizobiaceae
                - - Bartonellaceae
                  - - Phyllobacterium (Note: Phyllobacterium is separate from the rest of Phyllobacteriaceae.)
                    - Brucellaceae
        - - Tepidamorphaceae
          - - Kaistiaceae
            - - - Pseudoxanthobacteraceae
                - - Prosthecomicrobium (Note: Prosthecomicrobium is separate from the rest of Hyphomicrobiaceae.)
                  - Pleomorphomonadaceae
              - - - - Blastochloridaceae
                    - Xanthobacteraceae
                  - - Phreatobacteraceae
                    - Nitrobacteraceae
                - - - Beijerinckiaceae
                    - - Roseiarcaceae
                      - Methylocystaceae
                  - - Chelatococcaceae
                    - - Boseaceae
                      - - Salinarimonadaceae
                        - Methylobacteriaceae
  - outgroups
    - Rhodobacterales
    - - Parvularculales
      - Caulobacterales

== Natural genetic transformation ==
Natural genetic transformation has been reported in at least four Hyphomicrobiales species: Agrobacterium tumefaciens, Methylobacterium organophilum, Ensifer adhaerens, and Bradyrhizobium japonicum. Natural genetic transformation is a sexual process involving DNA transfer from one bacterial cell to another through the intervening medium, and the integration of the donor sequence into the recipient genome by homologous recombination.

== See also ==
- Lar1
