= Belnapia moabensis =

Scientific classification
- Domain: Bacteria
- Kingdom: Pseudomonadati
- Phylum: Pseudomonadota
- Class: Alphaproteobacteria
- Order: Rhodospirillales
- Family: Acetobacteraceae
- Genus: Belnapia
- Species: B. moabensis

Binomial name
- Belnapia moabensis Reddy et al. 2006

Type strain
- ATCC BAA-1043, DSM 16746, CP2C

Species of bacterium

Belnapia moabensis is a Gram-negative, aerobic bacterium belonging to the genus Belnapia, within the family Acetobacteraceae and class Alphaproteobacteria. It has a non-motile, coccoid (spherical) cell shape and is most commonly found in biological soil crusts of arid and semi-arid ecosystems. Within these crusts, B. moabensis likely contributes to nutrient cycling and ecological stability through interacting with other microorganisms present in the soil such as Cyanobacteria, fungi, and lichens. Its adaptation to harsh environments (i.e. little to no moisture, high temperatures and solar radiation, and limited nutrient availability) shows its ecological resilience in desert-like habitats.

== History and discovery ==
Belnapia moabensis was first isolated and formally described by G. S. N. Reddy, M. Nagy, and F. Garcia-Pichel, with the genus description published in 2006 in the International Journal of Systematic and Evolutionary Microbiology. The organism was discovered during an investigation into the microbial diversity of biological soil crusts (BSCs) in 2003. BSCs are microbial communities that form a cohesive surface layer in arid and semi-arid soils. Researchers used a polyphasic taxonomic approach, isolating the bacterium from BSC samples collected near Moab, Utah on the Colorado Plateau (38°34.984'N, 109°31.451'W) and repeatedly re-streaking cultures on TSA (tryptic soy agar) and R2A (Reasoner's 2A agar) media to obtain a pure strain. TSA and R2A are general-purpose growth media commonly used for isolating heterotrophic bacteria. The type strain, B. moabensis CP2C (where CP2C denotes "Colorado Plateau, crust sample 2, culture C"), was collected at this location. The genus name honors Jayne Belnap, a leading researcher in biological soil crusts, while the species epithet refers to the town of Moab, where the strain was first discovered.

== Diversity ==
=== Taxonomy and phylogeny ===
Belnapia moabensis belongs to the Bacteria domain, the Pseudomonadota phylum, the Alphaproteobacteria class, the Rhodospirillales order, and the Acetobacteraceae family, and the Belnapia genus. 16S rRNA gene sequence analysis shows that the Belnapia genus forms a well-supported monophyletic evolutionary group that is clearly separated from its closest relatives: Roseomonas mucosa (~93.8% similarity), Roseomonas gilardii (~94.2%), Muricoccus roseus (~94.9% similarity), and Paracraurococcus ruber (~94.9% similarity). Roseomonas mucosa and Roseomonas gilardii are the two most closely related species to B. moabensis, sharing approximately 93.8% and 94.2% 16S rRNA gene sequence similarity, respectively; however, these values fall below the threshold for genus-level classification, showing how Belnapia is part of a unique taxonomic group. Instead of phototrophic metabolism, Belnapia exhibits a metabolic profile that consists of strictly aerobic, heterotrophic growth. These differences highlight an evolutionary divergence in which Belnapia has genetic relatedness to phototrophic lineages while adapting to non-phototrophic ecological niches such as their soil crust environments. Since the original description, additional species have been added to the genus, including Belnapia rosea and Belnapia mucosa and Belnapia arida.

=== Genome characteristics and evolution ===
The genome of Belnapia moabensis is distinguished by its notably high G+C content (~75 mol%), a feature commonly associated with enhanced DNA stability in extremophilic microorganisms. This elevated G+C proportion contributes to structural integrity because the guanine–cytosine base pairs form three hydrogen bonds, compared to two in the adenine–thymine pairs, making the DNA more resistant to denaturation and mutation under environmental stress such as high temperatures, intense UV radiation, and other environmental stresses. This genomic trait reflects how the organism is able to survive in its natural habitat of harsh, arid biological soil crusts, routinely exposed to extreme solar radiation, desiccation, and thermal fluctuations. In addition to its genomic composition, the organism exhibits characteristic membrane adaptations, with fatty acids including C18:1 7c and C16:0, which help maintain membrane fluidity and function under fluctuating temperatures. The red pigmentation, attributed to carotenoids, in B. moabensis serves as a protective mechanism against oxidative stress and UV damage from the harsh environment. Together, these genomic and physiological features highlight the evolutionary strategies that enable B. moabensis to survive and persist in the arid, high-radiation ecosystems of the Colorado Plateau environment.

=== Ecology ===
Belnapia moabensis resides in arid ecosystems, particularly within biological soil crusts of desert regions, where it plays an important role in nutrient cycling and soil stabilization. These environments are characterized by extremely low organic matter and nutrient availability, and organisms like B. moabensis are adapted to survive under such oligotrophic conditions by utilizing alternative carbon sources such as oxalate. According to a review of the use of bio-based substances in soil stabilization, this bacterium, as part of the microbial community in soil crusts, contributes to the decomposition and transformation of organic compounds, supporting nutrient cycling in nutrient-poor environments. The same review explains that microorganisms within biological soil crusts stabilize soil by producing extracellular substances and biofilms that bind soil particles together, reducing erosion and enhancing soil cohesion. This microbial activity improves soil structural integrity by stabilizing loose particles, decreasing susceptibility to wind and water erosion, and promoting the formation of more persistent soil aggregates. In this way, B. moabensis not only survives in harsh desert conditions but also contributes to maintaining the physical stability and ecological functioning of arid soil environments.

== Applied science ==
=== Biotechnological potential ===
B. moabensis produces carotenoids as part of its adaptation to harsh environmental conditions, as noted in its original species description. It is also reported to accumulate ectoine, a naturally occurring amino acid derivative that functions as a compatible solute, enabling bacteria to counteract osmotic stress, desiccation, and temperature extremes by stabilizing proteins and cellular membranes. Ectoine is of significant industrial interest: it is produced commercially by extremophilic bacteria and has widespread applications as a stabilizer for enzymes, cells, and tissues under stress conditions. Carotenoids function as antioxidants and pigments with established applications in food, cosmetic, and pharmaceutical product formulations. Extremophilic organisms that naturally produce both types of stress-protective metabolites are of interest to researchers studying next-generation biomanufacturing, as understanding the genetic basis of their production in such organisms could inform more efficient industrial processes.

=== Skincare and pharmacology ===
Ectoine has been studied for its protective and therapeutic effects on human skin. Pre-clinical and clinical research has demonstrated that ectoine-based formulations increase skin moisture, improve the skin's barrier function, and reduce symptoms of atopic dermatitis and other inflammatory skin conditions. Ectoine has also been shown to protect skin cells from UV-induced damage and reduce signs of aging. These properties have led to the development of ectoine-containing topical products, including creams and eye drops, that are currently available commercially.
