= Roseomonas arcticisoli =

Scientific classification
- Domain: Bacteria
- Kingdom: Pseudomonadati
- Phylum: Pseudomonadota
- Class: Alphaproteobacteria
- Order: Rhodospirillales
- Family: Acetobacteraceae
- Genus: Roseomonas
- Species: R. arcticisoli

Binomial name
- Roseomonas arcticisoli Kim 2016

Species of bacterium

Roseomonas arcticisoli is a species of Gram negative, strictly aerobic, coccobacilli-shaped, light red-colored bacteria. It was first isolated from tundra soil near Ny-Ålesund in Svalbard, Norway. The species name refers to the Arctic soil from which it was first isolated.

Roseomonas arctica was isolated from the same region, but R. arcticsoli is more closely related to R. wooponensis than to R. arctica.

The optimum growth temperature for R. arcticisoli is 25-30 °C, but can grow in the 10-37 °C range. The optimum pH 8.0, and can grow in pH 5.0-9.0.
