= Roseomonas arctica =

Scientific classification
- Domain: Bacteria
- Kingdom: Pseudomonadati
- Phylum: Pseudomonadota
- Class: Alphaproteobacteria
- Order: Rhodospirillales
- Family: Acetobacteraceae
- Genus: Roseomonas
- Species: R. arctica

Binomial name
- Roseomonas arctica Qiu 2016

Species of bacterium

Roseomonas arctica is a species of Gram negative, strictly aerobic, coccobacilli-shaped, psychrotrophic, light red-colored bacteria. It was first isolated from soil in the glacier foreland of Ny-Ålesund in Svalbard, Norway. The species name refers to the Arctic region from which it was first isolated.

Roseomonas arcticisoli was also isolated from the same region, but R. arcticisoli is more closely related to R. wooponensis than to R. arctica.

The optimum growth temperature for R. arctica is 18-20 °C, but can grow in the 4-25 °C range. The optimum pH is 6.0-7.0, and can grow in pH 4.0-8.0.
