= Roseomonas aerophila =

Scientific classification
- Domain: Bacteria
- Kingdom: Pseudomonadati
- Phylum: Pseudomonadota
- Class: Alphaproteobacteria
- Order: Rhodospirillales
- Family: Acetobacteraceae
- Genus: Roseomonas
- Species: R. aerophila

Binomial name
- Roseomonas aerophila Kim 2013

Species of bacterium

Roseomonas aerophila is a species of Gram negative, strictly aerobic, coccobacilli-shaped, pink-colored bacterium. It was first isolated from an air sample in Taean County, South Korea, and the new species was proposed in 2013. The species name comes from Latin aer (air) and philos (loving). Another species of Roseomonas, R. aerilata, was also isolated from the air in a different region of South Korea.

The optimum growth temperature for R. aerophila is 30 °C, but can grow in the 4-40 °C range. The optimum pH is 7.0, and can grow in pH 5.0-9.0.
