= Roseomonas riguiloci =

Scientific classification
- Domain: Bacteria
- Kingdom: Pseudomonadati
- Phylum: Pseudomonadota
- Class: Alphaproteobacteria
- Order: Rhodospirillales
- Family: Acetobacteraceae
- Genus: Roseomonas
- Species: R. riguiloci

Binomial name
- Roseomonas riguiloci Baik 2012

Species of bacterium

Roseomonas riguiloci is a species of Gram negative, strictly aerobic, coccobacilli-shaped, pinkish-red-colored bacterium. It was first isolated from freshwater from the Woopo wetland in Gyeongnam Province, South Korea and the species was first proposed in 2012. The species name is derived from Latin riguus (well-watered) and locus (a site).

Roseomonas wooponensis was also first isolated from the Woopo wetland.

The optimum growth temperature for R. riguiloci is 25-30 °C, but can grow in the 15-40 °C range. The optimum pH is 7.0, and can grow in pH 5.0-11.0.
