= Roseomonas eburnea =

Scientific classification
- Domain: Bacteria
- Kingdom: Pseudomonadati
- Phylum: Pseudomonadota
- Class: Alphaproteobacteria
- Order: Rhodospirillales
- Family: Acetobacteraceae
- Genus: Roseomonas
- Species: R. eburnea

Binomial name
- Roseomonas eburnea Wang 2016

Species of bacterium

Roseomonas eburnea is a species of Gram negative, strictly aerobic, coccobacilli-shaped, ivory-colored bacterium. It was first isolated from activated sludge from an herbicide-manufacturing wastewater treatment facility in Jiangsu province, China, and the species was first proposed in 2016. R. eburnea, unlike most species of Roseomonas which are pink or light red, is ivory-pigmented. The species name comes from Latin eburnea (white as ivory). R. chloroacetimidivorans was isolated at the same time as R. eburnea.

The optimum growth temperature for R. eburnea is 30 °C, but can grow in the 15-35 °C range. The optimum pH is 6.0-8.0.
