= Strain 121 =

Scientific classification
- Domain: Archaea
- Phylum: Thermoproteota
- Class: Thermoprotei
- Order: Desulfurococcales
- Family: Pyrodictiaceae
- Genus: Geogemma
- Species: G. barossii

Species of archaeon

Strain 121 (Geogemma barossii (name not recognized by the International List of Prokaryotic Names by Standing in Nomenclature (LPSN)) is a single-celled microbe of the domain Archaea.

First discovered in 2003 within a hydrothermal vent in the Northeast Pacific Ocean near the Endeavor segment of the Juan de Fuca Ridge, Strain 121 is a hyperthermophile capable of reproducing at 121 °C (250 °F), hence its name. Strain 121 is biostatic at 130 °C (266 °F), so while the archaeon is unable to reproduce until it has been transferred to a cooler medium, it remains viable at temperatures up to 131 °C (268 °F). Strain 121 possess a coccoid shape with lophotrichous flagellation, reaching approximately 1 μm in diameter. Strain 121 metabolizes by reducing iron oxide (Fe(III)), a molecule that is abundant within the sediment in hydrothermal vents.

The maximum growth temperature of strain 121 is 8 °C higher than the previous record holder, Pyrolobus fumarii (T_{max}= 113 °C). At the time of its discovery, Strain 121 was the only known form of life that could tolerate such high temperatures, but in 2008 Methanopyrus kandleri was discovered to be able to reproduce at temperatures as high as 122 °C. Autoclaves, which are an important tool in sterilization, operate at temperatures of 121 °C (250 °F), marking Strain 121 a particularly notable discovery. Prior to the 2003 discovery of Strain 121, a fifteen-minute exposure to autoclave temperatures was believed to kill all living organisms. However, as Strain 121 is unable to reproduce at temperatures below 85 °C (185 °F), it cannot infect humans, who have an average body temperature of approximately 37 °C (99 °F).

It appears highly improbable that Strain 121 marks the upper limit of viable growth temperature. It may very well be the case that the true upper limit lies somewhere in the vicinity of 140 to 150 °C (284 to 302 °F), the temperature range where molecular repair and resynthesis becomes unsustainable.

== See also ==
- Methanopyrus kandleri (Strain 116)
- 2003 in science
