= Roseomonas oryzae =

Scientific classification
- Domain: Bacteria
- Kingdom: Pseudomonadati
- Phylum: Pseudomonadota
- Class: Alphaproteobacteria
- Order: Rhodospirillales
- Family: Acetobacteraceae
- Genus: Roseomonas
- Species: R. oryzae

Binomial name
- Roseomonas oryzae Ramaprasad 2015

Species of bacterium

Roseomonas oryzae is a species of Gram negative, strictly aerobic, coccobacilli-shaped, pale pink-colored bacterium. It was first isolated from rice paddy rhizosphere soil in Western Ghats, Kankumbi, India. The species name is derived from Latin oryzae (of rice).

Two other species of Roseomonas have been isolated from soil rhizosphere: R. hibiscisoli and R. rhizosphaerae.

The optimum growth temperature for R. oryzae is 30 °C, but can grow in the 4-45 °C range. The optimum pH is 7.0, and can grow in pH 6.0-7.5.
