= Belnapia soli =

Scientific classification
- Domain: Bacteria
- Kingdom: Pseudomonadati
- Phylum: Pseudomonadota
- Class: Alphaproteobacteria
- Order: Rhodospirillales
- Family: Acetobacteraceae
- Genus: Belnapia
- Species: B. soli

Binomial name
- Belnapia soli Jin et al. 2013

Type strain
- PB-K8, JCM 18033, KCTC 23765

Species of bacterium

Belnapia soli is a Gram-negative, aerobic, non-spore-forming and non-motile bacterium from the genus Belnapia which has been isolated from soil from Daejeon in Korea.
