= Roseomonas alkaliterrae =

Scientific classification
- Domain: Bacteria
- Kingdom: Pseudomonadati
- Phylum: Pseudomonadota
- Class: Alphaproteobacteria
- Order: Rhodospirillales
- Family: Acetobacteraceae
- Genus: Roseomonas
- Species: R. alkaliterrae

Binomial name
- Roseomonas alkaliterrae Dong 2014

Species of bacterium

Roseomonas alkaliterrae is a species of Gram negative, strictly aerobic, coccobacilli-shaped, pink-colored bacteria. It was first isolated from the soil around a geothermal hot spring in Tengchong, China. The species name refers to the alkaline soil from which the species was first isolated.

The optimum growth temperature for R. alkaliterrae is 40-50 °C, but can grow in the 5-50 °C range. The optimum pH is 8.0-10.0, and can grow in pH 6.0-11.0.
