= Acidocella aromatica =

Scientific classification
- Domain: Bacteria
- Kingdom: Pseudomonadati
- Phylum: Pseudomonadota
- Class: Alphaproteobacteria
- Order: Rhodospirillales
- Family: Acetobacteraceae
- Genus: Acidocella
- Species: A. aromatica

Binomial name
- Acidocella aromatica Jones 2013

Species of bacteria

Acidocella aromatica is a species of alphaproteobacteria. It has been studied for its potential in environmental bioremediation.

== Discovery ==
Acidocella aromatica was first described from three isolates, two of which originated from acidic mine drainage water found in the Wheal Jane tin mine in western Cornwall. Its binomial name refers to its ability to break down aromatic compounds.

== Description ==
Acidocella aromatica is a gram-negative, rod-shaped bacteria, ranging from 1-2 μm in length and 0.2-0.4 μm in width. It is motile, does not form endospores, and is largely aerobic, although it is able to grow in anaerobic conditions alongside sulfidogenic bacteria, where it is able to perform ferric iron reduction. It is an obligate acidophile, growing optimally at a pH of 3.8, with the capacity to grow in a pH range of 2.5-5. A. aromatica is a mesophile, growing between temperatures of 15-37.5 °C.

A. aromatica is unable to grow on many common monosaccharides, such as glucose and galactose. It is, however, able to grow on fructose. It is also able to grow on aromatic compounds such as sodium benzoate, phenol, and benzyl alcohol. When compared to other species of Acidocella, A. aromatica has relatively typical metal tolerances, although is notably tolerant towards nickel.

== Bioremediation potential ==
Acidocella aromatica has been investigated for its potential in the field of environmental bioremediation. Studies have found it to reduce toxic vanadium(V) to the less toxic oxidation state vanadium(IV). Similarly, it is capable of reducing chromium(IV) to the less toxic chromium(III).
