= Thalassocola ureilytica =

Scientific classification
- Domain: Bacteria
- Kingdom: Pseudomonadati
- Phylum: Pseudomonadota
- Class: Alphaproteobacteria
- Order: Rhodospirillales
- Family: Kiloniellaceae
- Genus: Thalassocola
- Species: T. ureilytica

Binomial name
- Thalassocola ureilytica Lin et al. 2015

Type strain
- BCRC 80818, LS-861, JCM 30682

Species of bacterium

Thalassocola ureilytica is a Gram-negative, aerobic and rod-shaped bacterium from the genus of Thalassocola which has been isolated from seawater from the South China Sea.
