= Roseomonas terrae =

Scientific classification
- Domain: Bacteria
- Kingdom: Pseudomonadati
- Phylum: Pseudomonadota
- Class: Alphaproteobacteria
- Order: Rhodospirillales
- Family: Acetobacteraceae
- Genus: Roseomonas
- Species: R. terrae

Binomial name
- Roseomonas terrae Yoon 2007

Species of bacterium

Roseomonas terrae is a species of Gram negative, strictly aerobic, coccobacilli-shaped, pale yellow to pale pink-pigmented bacterium. It was first isolated from a soil sample collected from the island of Liancourt Rocks in South Korea. The new species name was first proposed in 2007 and derives from Latin terrae (of the soil).

The optimum growth temperature for R. terrae is 25 °C, but can grow in the 10-36 °C range. The optimum pH is 7.0-8.0, and can grow in pH 5.5-10.5.
