= Roseomonas suffusca =

Scientific classification
- Domain: Bacteria
- Kingdom: Pseudomonadati
- Phylum: Pseudomonadota
- Class: Alphaproteobacteria
- Order: Rhodospirillales
- Family: Acetobacteraceae
- Genus: Roseomonas
- Species: R. suffusca

Binomial name
- Roseomonas suffusca Subhash 2017

Species of bacterium

Roseomonas suffusca is a species of Gram negative, strictly aerobic, coccobacilli-shaped, light brown-colored bacterium. It was first isolated from lagoon sediments located near North Carolina State University in 2015, and the species was first proposed in 2017. The species name comes from Latin suffusca (brownish), referring to the color that the bacterial colonies form, as opposed to the pink coloration of most members of the genus Roseomonas.

Roseomonas rubra was also first isolated during the same survey of lagoon sediments.

The optimum growth temperature for R. suffusca is 30–35 °C, but can grow in the 13–42 °C range. The optimum pH is 7.0–7.5, and can grow in pH 6.5–9.1.
