= Roseomonas hibiscisoli =

Scientific classification
- Domain: Bacteria
- Kingdom: Pseudomonadati
- Phylum: Pseudomonadota
- Class: Alphaproteobacteria
- Order: Rhodospirillales
- Family: Acetobacteraceae
- Genus: Roseomonas
- Species: R. hibiscisoli

Binomial name
- Roseomonas hibiscisoli Yan 2017

Species of bacterium

Roseomonas hibiscisoli is a species of Gram negative, strictly aerobic, coccobacilli-shaped, pink-colored bacteria. It was first isolated from the rhizosphere of a Hibiscus syriacus plant, and the new species was proposed in 2017. The species name derives from the Hibiscus plant from which it was first isolated. Roseomonas rhizosphaerae was also previously isolated from the rhizosphere of a plant.

The optimum growth temperature for R. hibiscisoli is 28 °C, but can grow in the 20-40 °C range. The optimum pH is 7.0, and can grow in pH 5.0-9.0.
