= Roseomonas cervicalis =

Scientific classification
- Domain: Bacteria
- Kingdom: Pseudomonadati
- Phylum: Pseudomonadota
- Class: Alphaproteobacteria
- Order: Rhodospirillales
- Family: Acetobacteraceae
- Genus: Roseomonas
- Species: R. cervicalis

Binomial name
- Roseomonas cervicalis Rhis 1993

Species of bacterium

Roseomonas cervicalis is a species of Gram negative, strictly aerobic, coccobacilli-shaped, pink-pigmented bacterium. It was first isolated from the cervix of a woman in New Jersey in 1980. The new species was among the first Roseomonas species proposed in 1993, and the name derives from the fact that it was first isolated from a cervix. R. cervicalis is pathogenic for humans and can cause urogenital or eye infections, among others.
