= Roseomonas aceris =

Scientific classification
- Domain: Bacteria
- Kingdom: Pseudomonadati
- Phylum: Pseudomonadota
- Class: Alphaproteobacteria
- Order: Rhodospirillales
- Family: Acetobacteraceae
- Genus: Roseomonas
- Species: R. aceris

Binomial name
- Roseomonas aceris Tonouchi 2014

Species of bacterium

Roseomonas aceris is a species of Gram negative, strictly aerobic, coccobacilli-shaped, light red-colored bacteria. It was first isolated from the trunk of a mono maple tree (Acer mono) in the Shirakami-Sanchi forest region of Japan. The species was named after the Acer tree genus from which it was isolated.

The optimum growth temperature for R. aceris is 30 °C, but can grow in the 10-35 °C range. The optimum pH is 7.0, and can grow in pH 6.0-9.0.
