= Acidisphaera =

Scientific classification
- Domain: Bacteria
- Kingdom: Pseudomonadati
- Phylum: Pseudomonadota
- Class: Alphaproteobacteria
- Order: Rhodospirillales
- Family: Acetobacteraceae
- Genus: Acidisphaera; Hiraishi et al. 2000

Type species
- A. rubrifaciens

Genus of bacteria

Acidisphaera is a genus in the phylum Pseudomonadota (Bacteria). The genus contains a single species, namely A. rubrifaciens with the following characteristics:

- strictly aerobic, light preferred
- mesophilic
- acidophilic (3.5–6.0 pH, optima of 4.5-5.0)
- bacteriochlorophyll (BChl a) and carotenoids production (salmon-pink colonies), the former contained zinc if grown in the presence of 1 mM zinc sulfate.
- chemo-organotrophic
- Gram-negative, as expected from a proteobacterium
- isolated from acidic hot springs and mine drainage
- non-motile
- cocci / coccobacilli
- Part of the major acidophilic alphaproteobacterial group with the genera Acidiphilium and Rhodopila

== Etymology ==
The name Acidisphaera derives from:
Neo-Latin noun acidum (from Latin adjective acidus, sour), an acid; Latin feminine gender noun sphaera, a ball, globe, sphere; Neo-Latin feminine gender noun Acidisphaera, acid (-requiring) coccoid microorganism.
While the specific epithet rubrifaciens comes from the Latin adjective ruber -bra -brum, red; Latin v. facio, to make; Neo-Latin participle adjective rubrifaciens, red-producing.)

== See also ==
- Bacterial taxonomy
- Microbiology
