= Roseomonas musae =

Scientific classification
- Domain: Bacteria
- Kingdom: Pseudomonadati
- Phylum: Pseudomonadota
- Class: Alphaproteobacteria
- Order: Rhodospirillales
- Family: Acetobacteraceae
- Genus: Roseomonas
- Species: R. musae

Binomial name
- Roseomonas musae Nutaratat 2013

Species of bacterium

Roseomonas musae is a species of Gram negative, strictly aerobic, coccobacilli-shaped, white-colored bacteria. It was first isolated from a banana leaf (Musa sapientum) from Mattra Island in Chumphon Islands National Park, Chumphon province, Thailand in May 2009. The species name is derived from the genus Musa from which it was isolated.

The optimum growth temperature for R. musae is 30 °C, but can grow in the 20-40 °C range. The optimum pH is 7.0, and can grow in pH 6.0-8.0.
