= Bombella apis =

Scientific classification
- Domain: Bacteria
- Kingdom: Pseudomonadati
- Phylum: Pseudomonadota
- Class: Alphaproteobacteria
- Order: Rhodospirillales
- Family: Acetobacteraceae
- Genus: Bombella
- Species: B. apis

Binomial name
- Bombella apis Yun et al. 2017

Type strain
- JCM 31623, KCTC 52452, strain MRM1

Species of bacterium

Bombella apis is a Gram-negative, strictly aerobic, non-spore-forming, rod-shaped and non-motile bacterium from the genus of Bombella which has been isolated from the midgut of a bee (Apis mellifera).
