= Roseomonas ludipueritiae =

Scientific classification
- Domain: Bacteria
- Kingdom: Pseudomonadati
- Phylum: Pseudomonadota
- Class: Alphaproteobacteria
- Order: Rhodospirillales
- Family: Acetobacteraceae
- Genus: Roseomonas
- Species: R. ludipueritiae

Binomial name
- Roseomonas ludipueritiae Sanchez-Porro 2009

Species of bacterium

Roseomonas ludipueritiae is a species of Gram negative, strictly aerobic, coccobacilli-shaped, pale yellow-colored bacteria. It was first isolated from a children's day care center in 1995. Further work on the isolate led to the proposal of a new genus and species, Teichococcus ludipueritiae in 2003. Further work on T. ludipueritiae found that the species belonged in the genus Roseomonas, and also led to Muricoccus roseus being reclassified as Roseomonas rosea. The species name is derived from Latin ludus (garden) and pueritia (boyhood), referring to the kindergarten day care from which the species was first isolated.

The optimum growth temperature for R. ludipueritiae is 30 °C, but can grow in the 15-45 °C range.
