= Roseomonas frigidaquae =

Scientific classification
- Domain: Bacteria
- Kingdom: Pseudomonadati
- Phylum: Pseudomonadota
- Class: Alphaproteobacteria
- Order: Rhodospirillales
- Family: Acetobacteraceae
- Genus: Roseomonas
- Species: R. frigidaquae

Binomial name
- Roseomonas frigidaquae Kim 2009

Species of bacterium

Roseomonas frigidaquae is a species of Gram negative, strictly aerobic, coccobacilli-shaped, light pink-colored bacteria. It was first isolated from a water-cooling system from an oxygen-producing plant in Gwangyang, South Korea. The species name is derived from Latin frigidus (cold) and aqua (water).

The optimum growth temperature for R. frigidaquae is 30 °C, but can grow in the 12-37 °C range. The optimum pH is 7.0, and can grow in pH 6.0-10.0.
