= Acidocella aluminiidurans =

Scientific classification
- Domain: Bacteria
- Kingdom: Pseudomonadati
- Phylum: Pseudomonadota
- Class: Alphaproteobacteria
- Order: Rhodospirillales
- Family: Acetobacteraceae
- Genus: Acidocella
- Species: A. aluminiidurans

Binomial name
- Acidocella aluminiidurans Kimoto et al. 2010

Species of bacteria

Acidocella aluminiidurans is a species of alphaproteobacteria known for its high tolerance to aluminum.

== Discovery ==
Acidocella aluminiidurans was first isolated from Panicum repens, a species of grass, found in acid sulfate soil in Cần Thơ, Vietnam. Its binomial name refers to its tolerance to aluminum.

== Description ==
Acidocella aluminiidurans lives as gram-negative rods measuring 0.3 μm in width and between 1.2-1.6 μm in length. It is non-motile and is obligately aerobic. It grows at temperatures ranging from 17–42 °C, and at a pH range of 3.0–7.0. Colonies are white, smooth, and convex when grown on tryptic soy agar. Growth is observed on media with 500 mM aluminum sulfate or 200 mM aluminum chloride, suggesting a high aluminum tolerance.

== Ecology ==
In addition to acidic soil in Vietnam, Acidocella aluminiidurans has been isolated from highly acidic mine drainage water from the Karaerik copper mine in Espiye, Northeast Turkey. It has also been isolated from brewery wastewater in Jeonju, Korea, as well as detected in peat bogs in Styria, Austria.

== Bioremediation potential ==
Acidocella aluminiidurans produces a capsular polysaccharide capable of aluminum adsorption. It has been suggested that this ability may be useful in removing excess aluminum from soil that would otherwise damage crops.
