= Acidomonas methanolica =

Scientific classification
- Domain: Bacteria
- Kingdom: Pseudomonadati
- Phylum: Pseudomonadota
- Class: Alphaproteobacteria
- Order: Rhodospirillales
- Family: Acetobacteraceae
- Genus: Acidomonas
- Species: A. methanolica

Binomial name
- Acidomonas methanolica Urakami et al. 1989

Type strain
- ATCC 43581, BCRC 16049, CCRC 16049, CCUG 37300, CIP 103167, DSM 5432, IMET 10945, JCM 6891, LMD 89.7, LMG 1668, NCCB 89007, NRIC 0498, TK 0705, Uhlig MB 58, Urakami TK 0705, VKM B-2104

Synonyms
- Acetobacter methanolicusa

Species of bacterium

Acidomonas methanolica is an acidophilic, facultatively methylotrophic bacterium from the genus Acidomonas, which was isolated from septic methanol yeast in East Germany. Acidomonas methanolica is the only known species from the genus Acidomonas.
