= Asaia siamensis =

Scientific classification
- Domain: Bacteria
- Kingdom: Pseudomonadati
- Phylum: Pseudomonadota
- Class: Alphaproteobacteria
- Order: Rhodospirillales
- Family: Acetobacteraceae
- Genus: Asaia
- Species: A. siamensis

Binomial name
- Asaia siamensis Katsura et al. 2001

Species of bacterium

Asaia siamensis is a species of acetic acid bacterium. It was first isolated from a flower of Calotropis gigantea collected in Bangkok. Its type strain is NRIC 0323^{T} (= JCM 10715^{T} = IFO 16457^{T}).
