= Roseomonas elaeocarpi =

Scientific classification
- Domain: Bacteria
- Kingdom: Pseudomonadati
- Phylum: Pseudomonadota
- Class: Alphaproteobacteria
- Order: Rhodospirillales
- Family: Acetobacteraceae
- Genus: Roseomonas
- Species: R. elaeocarpi

Binomial name
- Roseomonas elaeocarpi Damtab 2016

Species of bacterium

Roseomonas elaeocarpi is a species of Gram negative, strictly aerobic, coccobacilli-shaped, pink-colored bacterium. It was first isolated from the leaf of an olive-like tree (Elaeocarpus hygrophilus) in the Ubon Ratchathani province, Thailand. The species name is derived from the genus of tree from which the species was first isolated.

The optimum growth temperature for R. elaeocarpi is 30 °C, but can grow in the 15-35 °C range. The optimum pH is 6.0, and can grow in pH 5.0-7.5.
