= Roseomonas vinacea =

Scientific classification
- Domain: Bacteria
- Kingdom: Pseudomonadati
- Phylum: Pseudomonadota
- Class: Alphaproteobacteria
- Order: Rhodospirillales
- Family: Acetobacteraceae
- Genus: Roseomonas
- Species: R. vinacea

Binomial name
- Roseomonas vinacea Zhang 2008

Species of bacterium

Roseomonas vinacea is a species of Gram negative, strictly aerobic, coccobacilli-shaped, wine-red-colored bacterium. It was first isolated from a soil sample collected from the Tibetan Plateau, China, and the species was first proposed in 2008. The species name is derived from Latin vinacea (of or belonging to wine or to the grape), referring to the color that the bacterial colonies form.

The optimum growth temperature for R. vinacea is 30-32 °C, but can grow in the 4-40 °C range. The optimum pH is 7.0-7.5 and can grow at pH 6.5-8.0.
