= Granulibacter bethesdensis =

Scientific classification
- Domain: Bacteria
- Kingdom: Pseudomonadati
- Phylum: Pseudomonadota
- Class: Alphaproteobacteria
- Order: Rhodospirillales
- Family: Acetobacteraceae
- Genus: Granulibacter
- Species: G. bethesdensis

Binomial name
- Granulibacter bethesdensis Greenberg et al. 2006

Species of bacterium

Granulibacter bethesdensis is a Gram-negative, aerobic coccobacillus to rod-shaped, non-motile, catalase-positive and oxidase-negative bacteria first described in 2006 by Dr. Steve Holland's team, which included Dr. David E. Greenberg and Dr. Patrick R. Murray at the National Institutes of Health in Bethesda, Maryland.

It is the only species in a sublineage within the acetic acid bacteria in the family Acetobacteraceae.

== Microbiology ==
G. bethesdensis is a fastidious organism and grows poorly and slowly on sheep blood agar with an optimum temperature of 35-37°C and favors a pH of 5.0-6.5.

Unique characteristics that distinguish it from other acetic acid bacteria include the production of a yellow pigment, the oxidization of lactate and acetate to carbon dioxide and water, acidification of ethanol, and the ability to use methanol as a sole carbon source.

The genome of G. bethesdensis consists of a circular chromosome and was found to be 2,708,355 bp with a 59.07% G+C count.

== Clinical Significance ==
Granulibacter bethesdensis was identified in a series of patients with chronic granulomatous disease (CGD). In a later study, nearly half of patients with CGD tested and a quarter of healthy volunteers showed some immunoreactivity to Granulibacter bethesdensis, suggesting infections with this organism occur more often than it is isolated.

Symptoms of G. bethesdensis infection include prolonged fever and necrotizing lymphadenitis. Why this organism exclusively causes clinical disease in CGD patients is not well understood.

Unlike typical CGD organisms, G. bethesdensis can achieve clinical latency within a patient, relapsing after apparently effective therapy. However, disseminated G. bethesdensis infections were chronic but not fatal, which is also an unusual trait among CGD organisms.

== Treatment ==
G. bethesdensis is extensively resistant to many antimicrobial drugs, and susceptibility testing is difficult due to the slow growing nature of this organism. Resistance has been demonstrated against most cephalosporins, penicillins (including carbapenems), and quinolones. However, ceftriaxone, aminoglycosides, doxycycline and trimethoprim/sulfamethoxazole have shown activity against this bacterium.
