= Roseomonas tokyonensis =

Scientific classification
- Domain: Bacteria
- Kingdom: Pseudomonadati
- Phylum: Pseudomonadota
- Class: Alphaproteobacteria
- Order: Rhodospirillales
- Family: Acetobacteraceae
- Genus: Roseomonas
- Species: R. tokyonensis

Binomial name
- Roseomonas tokyonensis Furuhata 2013

Species of bacterium

Roseomonas tokyonensis is a species of Gram negative, strictly aerobic, coccobacilli-shaped, pale pink-pigmented bacterium. It was first isolated from a biofilm in a cooling tower in Tokyo, Japan in 2006. The new specie's name was first proposed in 2013, and is derived from Tokyo, the city in which the species was first isolated.

The optimum growth temperature for R. tokyonensis is 35 °C, but it can grow in the 25-40°C range as well. The optimum pH is 7.0, but it can grow at pH levels ranging from 5.0-10.0.
