= Roseomonas pecuniae =

Scientific classification
- Domain: Bacteria
- Kingdom: Pseudomonadati
- Phylum: Pseudomonadota
- Class: Alphaproteobacteria
- Order: Rhodospirillales
- Family: Acetobacteraceae
- Genus: Roseomonas
- Species: R. pecuniae

Binomial name
- Roseomonas pecuniae Lopes 2011

Species of bacterium

Roseomonas pecuniae is a species of Gram negative, strictly aerobic, coccobacilli-shaped, pinkish-red-colored bacterium. It was first isolated from the surface of a 50 Euro cent copper-alloy coin, and the species was first proposed in 2011. The species name comes from Latin pecuniae (of/from money or a coin).

The optimum growth temperature for R. pecuniae is 30 °C, but can grow in the 10-35 °C range. The optimum pH is 7.0.
