= Bombella intestini =

Scientific classification
- Domain: Bacteria
- Kingdom: Pseudomonadati
- Phylum: Pseudomonadota
- Class: Alphaproteobacteria
- Order: Rhodospirillales
- Family: Acetobacteraceae
- Genus: Bombella
- Species: B. intestini

Binomial name
- Bombella intestini Li et al. 2015

Type strain
- DSM 28636, LMG 28161, strain R-52487

Species of bacterium

Bombella intestini is a bacterium from the genus of Bombella which has been isolated from bumblebee crop.
