= Saccharibacter floricola =

Scientific classification
- Domain: Bacteria
- Kingdom: Pseudomonadati
- Phylum: Pseudomonadota
- Class: Alphaproteobacteria
- Order: Rhodospirillales
- Family: Acetobacteraceae
- Genus: Saccharibacter
- Species: S. floricola

Binomial name
- Saccharibacter floricola Jojima et al. 2004

Species of bacterium

Saccharibacter floricola is an osmophilic acetic acid bacterium first isolated from pollen. It is Gram-negative, aerobic and rod-shaped, with type strain S-877^{T} (=AJ 13480^{T} =JCM 12116^{T} =DSM 15669^{T}). It is the type species of its genus.
