= Roseomonas stagni =

Scientific classification
- Domain: Bacteria
- Kingdom: Pseudomonadati
- Phylum: Pseudomonadota
- Class: Alphaproteobacteria
- Order: Rhodospirillales
- Family: Acetobacteraceae
- Genus: Roseomonas
- Species: R. stagni

Binomial name
- Roseomonas stagni Furuhata 2008

Species of bacterium

Roseomonas stagni is a species of Gram-negative, strictly aerobic, coccobacilli-shaped, pink-colored bacterium. It was first isolated from sediment from pond water in Shizuoka, Japan, and the species was first proposed in 2008. The species name is derived from Latin stagni (of a pond).

The optimum growth temperature for R. stagni is 30 °C, but can grow in the 20-35 °C range. The optimum pH is 8.0 and can grow at pH 7.0-10.0.
