= Bombella favorum =

Scientific classification
- Domain: Bacteria
- Kingdom: Pseudomonadati
- Phylum: Pseudomonadota
- Class: Alphaproteobacteria
- Order: Rhodospirillales
- Family: Acetobacteraceae
- Genus: Bombella
- Species: B. favorum

Binomial name
- Bombella favorum Hilgarth et al. 2021

Type strain
- TMW 2.1889

Species of bacterium

Bombella favorum is a Gram-negative, aerobic and pellicle-forming bacterium from the genus of Bombella which has been isolated from a honeycomb of Western honey bees.
