= Roseomonas nepalensis =

Scientific classification
- Domain: Bacteria
- Kingdom: Pseudomonadati
- Phylum: Pseudomonadota
- Class: Alphaproteobacteria
- Order: Rhodospirillales
- Family: Acetobacteraceae
- Genus: Roseomonas
- Species: R. nepalensis

Binomial name
- Roseomonas nepalensis Chaudhary 2017

Species of bacterium

Roseomonas nepalensis is a species of Gram negative, strictly aerobic, coccobacilli-shaped, wine-red-colored bacterium. It was first isolated from oil-contaminated soil from Biratnagar, Nepal. The name is derived from the country from which it was first isolated.

R. nepalensis can grow in the 15-40 °C range and pH 6.0-10.0.
