= Aestuariispira insulae =

Scientific classification
- Domain: Bacteria
- Kingdom: Pseudomonadati
- Phylum: Pseudomonadota
- Class: Alphaproteobacteria
- Order: Rhodospirillales
- Family: Kiloniellaceae
- Genus: Aestuariispira
- Species: A. insulae

Binomial name
- Aestuariispira insulae Park et al. 2014

Type strain
- AH-MY2, CECT 8488, KCTC 32577

Synonyms
- Rhodospirillaceae bacterium

Species of bacterium

Aestuariispira insulae is a Gram-negative, aerobic and non-motile bacteria from the genus of Aestuariispira which has been isolated from tidal flat from the Aphae island in Korea.
