= Roseomonas aerofrigidensis =

Scientific classification
- Domain: Bacteria
- Kingdom: Pseudomonadati
- Phylum: Pseudomonadota
- Class: Alphaproteobacteria
- Order: Rhodospirillales
- Family: Acetobacteraceae
- Genus: Roseomonas
- Species: R. aerofrigidensis

Binomial name
- Roseomonas aerofrigidensis Hyeon 2017

Species of bacterium

Roseomonas aerofrigidensis is a species of Gram negative, strictly aerobic, coccobacilli-shaped, pink-colored bacterium. The bacteria was isolated first isolated from a laboratory air-conditioning system in South Korea, and the new species name was proposed in 2017. Another species of Roseomonas, R. aeriglobus, was also isolated from an air conditioner.

The optimum growth temperature for R. aerofrigidensis is 30 °C, but can grow in the 10-45 °C range. The optimum pH is 7.0, and can grow in pH 4.5-9.5.
