= Kozakia baliensis =

Scientific classification
- Domain: Bacteria
- Kingdom: Pseudomonadati
- Phylum: Pseudomonadota
- Class: Alphaproteobacteria
- Order: Rhodospirillales
- Family: Acetobacteraceae
- Genus: Kozakia
- Species: K. baliensis

Binomial name
- Kozakia baliensis Lisdiyanti et al. 2002

Species of bacterium

Kozakia baliensis is a species of acetic acid bacteria, with type strain Yo-3^{T} (= NRIC 0488^{T} = JCM 11301^{T} = IFO 16664^{T} = DSM 14400^{T}). It is the type species of its genus.
