= Roseococcus thiosulfatophilus =

Scientific classification
- Domain: Bacteria
- Kingdom: Pseudomonadati
- Phylum: Pseudomonadota
- Class: Alphaproteobacteria
- Order: Rhodospirillales
- Family: Acetobacteraceae
- Genus: Roseococcus
- Species: R. thiosulfatophilus

Binomial name
- Roseococcus thiosulfatophilus Yurkov et al. 1994

Species of bacterium

Roseococcus thiosulfatophilus is a species of bacterium, the type species of its genus.

== Description ==
It is an obligately aerobic, bacteriochlorophyll a-containing bacteria.
