= Roseomonas soli =

Scientific classification
- Domain: Bacteria
- Kingdom: Pseudomonadati
- Phylum: Pseudomonadota
- Class: Alphaproteobacteria
- Order: Rhodospirillales
- Family: Acetobacteraceae
- Genus: Roseomonas
- Species: R. soli

Binomial name
- Roseomonas soli Kim 2014

Species of bacterium

Roseomonas soli is a species of Gram negative, strictly aerobic, coccobacilli-shaped, white-colored bacterium. It was first isolated from rhizosphere soil cultivated with Chinese cabbage Brassica rapa in Namyangju, South Korea, and the species was first proposed in 2014. The species name is derived from Latin soli (of soil).

The optimum growth temperature for R. soli is 30 °C, but can grow in the 15-40 °C range. The optimum pH is 6.5 and can grow at pH 5.0-8.5.
