= Roseomonas lacus =

Scientific classification
- Domain: Bacteria
- Kingdom: Pseudomonadati
- Phylum: Pseudomonadota
- Class: Alphaproteobacteria
- Order: Rhodospirillales
- Family: Acetobacteraceae
- Genus: Roseomonas
- Species: R. lacus

Binomial name
- Roseomonas lacus Jiang 2006

Species of bacterium

Roseomonas lacus is a species of Gram negative, strictly aerobic, coccobacilli-shaped, pale pink-colored bacterium. It was first isolated from a freshwater sediment from Lake Tai in Jiangsu province, China, and the species was first proposed in 2006. The species name comes from Latin lacus (lake).

The optimum growth temperature for R. lacus is 30 °C, but can grow in the 15-40 °C range. The optimum pH is 7.0, and can grow in pH 6.0-9.0.
