= Roseomonas aeriglobus =

Scientific classification
- Domain: Bacteria
- Kingdom: Pseudomonadati
- Phylum: Pseudomonadota
- Class: Alphaproteobacteria
- Order: Rhodospirillales
- Family: Acetobacteraceae
- Genus: Roseomonas
- Species: R. aeriglobus

Binomial name
- Roseomonas aeriglobus Lee 2017

Species of bacterium

Roseomonas aeriglobus is a species of Gram negative, strictly aerobic, coccobacilli-shaped, pink-colored bacterium. The bacteria were first isolated from a laboratory air-conditioning system in South Korea, and proposed as a new species in 2017. Aeriglobus was chosen from the Latin aer (air) and globus (a sphere), to reference the shape of the bacteria, and that they were found in an air-conditioning system. Another species of Roseomonas, R. aerofrigidensis, was also isolated from an air conditioner.

The optimum growth temperature for R. aeriglobus is 25-30 °C, but can grow in the 10–30 °C range. The optimum pH is 6.0-7.0, and can grow in pH 4.0-9.0.
