= R. rosea =

R. rosea may refer to:

- Rhodinocichla rosea, the rosy thrush-tanager, a bird species
- Rhodiola rosea, the golden root, roseroot or Aaron's Rod, a plant species found in cold regions of the world
- Rhodostethia rosea, the Ross's gull, a bird species
- Romulea rosea, a herbaceous perennial plant species endemic to the western Cape Province in South Africa
- Roseomonas rosea, a species of Gram-negative bacteria

== See also ==
- Rosea (disambiguation)
