= Roseomonas terricola =

Scientific classification
- Domain: Bacteria
- Kingdom: Pseudomonadati
- Phylum: Pseudomonadota
- Class: Alphaproteobacteria
- Order: Rhodospirillales
- Family: Acetobacteraceae
- Genus: Roseomonas
- Species: R. terricola

Binomial name
- Roseomonas terricola Lee 2017

Species of bacterium

Roseomonas terricola is a species of Gram negative, strictly aerobic, Coccobacilli-shaped, pink-pigmented bacterium. It was first isolated from soil from farmland located in Yesan-gun in South Korea and the species was first proposed in 2017.

The optimum growth temperature for R. terricola is 35 °C, but can grow in the 15-40 °C range. The optimum pH is 7.0 and can grow at pH 6.0-9.0.
