= Roseomonas sediminicola =

Scientific classification
- Domain: Bacteria
- Kingdom: Pseudomonadati
- Phylum: Pseudomonadota
- Class: Alphaproteobacteria
- Order: Rhodospirillales
- Family: Acetobacteraceae
- Genus: Roseomonas
- Species: R. sediminicola

Binomial name
- Roseomonas sediminicola He 2014

Species of bacterium

Roseomonas sediminicola is a species of Gram negative, strictly aerobic, coccobacilli-shaped, pale red-colored bacterium. It was first isolated from sediment from a freshwater duck lake at the university KAIST in Daejeon, South Korea, and the species was first proposed in 2014. The species name is derived from Latin sedimen (sediment) and cola (inhabitant, dweller).

The optimum growth temperature for R. sediminicola is 25-37 °C, but can grow in the 10-37 °C range. The optimum pH is 7.0 and can grow at pH 5.5-10.0.
