= R. rubra =

R. rubra may refer to:

- Rallina rubra, the chestnut forest-rail, a bird species found in Indonesia and Papua New Guinea
- Rhamnus rubra, the red buckthorn, a flowering plant species
- Roseomonas rubra, a Gram-negative bacterium.
