= Asaia bogorensis =

Scientific classification
- Domain: Bacteria
- Kingdom: Pseudomonadati
- Phylum: Pseudomonadota
- Class: Alphaproteobacteria
- Order: Rhodospirillales
- Family: Acetobacteraceae
- Genus: Asaia
- Species: A. bogorensis

Binomial name
- Asaia bogorensis Yamada et al. 2000

Species of bacterium

Asaia bogorensis is a species of acetic acid bacterium. It is Gram-negative, aerobic, rod-shaped and peritrichously flagellated. It was first isolated from specimens of Bauhinia purpurea and Plumbago auriculata. Its type strain is 71^{T} (= NRIC 0311^{T} = JCM 10569^{T}). It is potentially pathogenic.

== Relationship with Plasmodium species ==
A. bogorensis has been implicated in modulating the susceptibility of mosquitoes to infection by Plasmodium parasites. A 2021 study reported that colonization of the mosquito midgut by A. bogorensis can promote parasite development by altering the physicochemical environment of the gut.
