= Asaia krungthepensis =

Scientific classification
- Domain: Bacteria
- Kingdom: Pseudomonadati
- Phylum: Pseudomonadota
- Class: Alphaproteobacteria
- Order: Rhodospirillales
- Family: Acetobacteraceae
- Genus: Asaia
- Species: A. krungthepensis

Binomial name
- Asaia krungthepensis Yukphan et al. 2004

Species of bacterium

Asaia krungthepensis is a species of acetic acid bacterium first isolated from a Heliconia flower. Its type strain is AA08^{T} (=BCC 12978^{T} =TISTR 1524^{T} =NBRC 100057^{T} =NRIC 0535^{T}).
