= Roseomonas aestuarii =

Scientific classification
- Domain: Bacteria
- Kingdom: Pseudomonadati
- Phylum: Pseudomonadota
- Class: Alphaproteobacteria
- Order: Rhodospirillales
- Family: Acetobacteraceae
- Genus: Roseomonas
- Species: R. aestuarii

Binomial name
- Roseomonas aestuarii Ramana 2010

Species of bacterium

Roseomonas aestuarii is a species of Gram negative, strictly aerobic, coccobacilli-shaped, orange-colored bacterium. It was first isolated from an estuarine environment in India, and the new species name was proposed in 2010.
