= Bombella =

Scientific classification
- Domain: Bacteria
- Kingdom: Pseudomonadati
- Phylum: Pseudomonadota
- Class: Alphaproteobacteria
- Order: Rhodospirillales
- Family: Acetobacteraceae
- Genus: Bombella; Li et al. 2015

Type species
- Bombella intestini

Species
- B. apis B. favorum B. intestini B. mellum

Genus of bacteria

Bombella is a genus of bacteria from the family of Acetobacteraceae.
