= Aestuariispira =

Scientific classification
- Domain: Bacteria
- Kingdom: Pseudomonadati
- Phylum: Pseudomonadota
- Class: Alphaproteobacteria
- Order: Rhodospirillales
- Family: Kiloniellaceae
- Genus: Aestuariispira; Park et al. 2014

Type species
- Aestuariispira insulae

Species
- A. insulae

Genus of bacteria

Aestuariispira is a bacterial genus from the family of Rhodospirillaceae. Up to now there is only one species of this genus known (Aestuariispira insulae).
