= Granulibacter =

Scientific classification
- Domain: Bacteria
- Kingdom: Pseudomonadati
- Phylum: Pseudomonadota
- Class: Alphaproteobacteria
- Order: Rhodospirillales
- Family: Acetobacteraceae
- Genus: Granulibacter; Greenberg et al. 2006

Type species
- Granulibacter bethesdensis

Species
- G. bethesdensis

Synonyms
- Granulobacter

Genus of bacteria

Granulibacter is a Gram-negative and non-motile bacterial genus from the family of Acetobacteraceae. Up to now there is only one species of this genus known (Granulibacter bethesdensis).
