= Roseomonas aerilata =

Scientific classification
- Domain: Bacteria
- Kingdom: Pseudomonadati
- Phylum: Pseudomonadota
- Class: Alphaproteobacteria
- Order: Rhodospirillales
- Family: Acetobacteraceae
- Genus: Roseomonas
- Species: R. aerilata

Binomial name
- Roseomonas aerilata Yoo 2008

Species of bacterium

Roseomonas aerilata is a species of Gram negative, strictly aerobic, coccobacilli-shaped, pink-colored bacterium. It was first isolated from an air sample in an urban environment in Suwon, South Korea, and the new species was proposed in 2008. The species name comes from Latin aer (air) and lata (carried), to reference the fact that the species was first isolated from an air sample.

The optimum growth temperature for R. aerilata is 30 °C, but can grow in the 5-35 °C range. The optimum pH range is 6-7, and can grow in pH 5-9. The species is highly intolerant of NaCl.
