= Asaia =

Scientific classification
- Domain: Bacteria
- Kingdom: Pseudomonadati
- Phylum: Pseudomonadota
- Class: Alphaproteobacteria
- Order: Rhodospirillales
- Family: Acetobacteraceae
- Genus: Asaia; Yamada et al. 2000

Type species
- Asaia bogorensis

Species
- Asaia astilbis Asaia bogorensis Asaia krungthepensis Asaia lannensis Asaia prunellae Asaia siamensis Asaia spathodeae

Genus of bacteria

Asaia is a genus of Gram-negative, aerobic and rod-shaped bacteria from the family Acetobacteraceae which occur in tropical plants. Asaia might be able to control malaria by massively colonizing the midgut and the male reproductive system of the mosquito Anopheles stephensi.
