= Terasakiella pusilla =

Scientific classification
- Domain: Bacteria
- Kingdom: Pseudomonadati
- Phylum: Pseudomonadota
- Class: Alphaproteobacteria
- Order: Rhodospirillales
- Family: Terasakiellaceae
- Genus: Terasakiella
- Species: T. pusilla

Binomial name
- Terasakiella pusilla Satomi et al. 2002

Type strain
- ATCC 33338, CIP 103382, DSM 6293, IAM 14442, IF6, IFO 13613, JCM 21225, LMG 5308, LMG 7372, NBRC 13613, NCIMB 2229, NCMB 2229, TerasakiIF6

Synonyms
- Oceanospirillum pusillum Spirillum pusillum

Species of bacterium

Terasakiella pusilla is a species of bacterium from the genus Terasakiella, which has been isolated from a putrid marine shellfish.
