= Commensalibacter =

Scientific classification
- Domain: Bacteria
- Kingdom: Pseudomonadati
- Phylum: Pseudomonadota
- Class: Alphaproteobacteria
- Order: Rhodospirillales
- Family: Acetobacteraceae
- Genus: Commensalibacter; Rho et al. 2008

Type species
- Commensalibacter intestini

Species
- C. intestini; C. melissae; C. papalotli; C. communis

Genus of bacteria

Commensalibacter is a genus of Gram-negative, aerobic and rod-shaped bacteria from the family of Acetobacteraceae which was originally isolated from Drosophila melanogaster. The complete genome of the type strain C. intestini A911^{T} has been sequenced.

Although originally isolated from Drosophila melanogaster, Commensalibacter intestini has been also found in honey bees and bumblebees.

Currently, there are four species validly named: Commensalibacter intestini, Commensalibacter communis, Commensalibacter melissae, and Commensalibacter papalotli. C. communis was recently isolated from the gut of bumble bees, butterflies, fruits, and hornets. C. melissae was exclusively isolated from honeybees. Its smaller genome compared to other Commensalibacter species suggests a unique evolutionary process. C. papalotli has been isolated from the monarch butterfly, other butterflies, and has also been isolated from the Asian hornet.

- - Commensalibacter
    - - - Commensalibacter papalotli
        - Commensalibacter communis
      - Commensalibacter intestini
    - - Commensalibacter melissae
  - outgroup
    Entomobacter
