= Craurococcus =

Scientific classification
- Domain: Bacteria
- Kingdom: Pseudomonadati
- Phylum: Pseudomonadota
- Class: Alphaproteobacteria
- Order: Rhodospirillales
- Family: Acetobacteraceae
- Genus: Craurococcus; Saitoh et al. 1998

Species
- C. roseus

Genus of bacteria

Craurococcus is a Gram-negative and non-motile genus of bacteria from the family of Acetobacteraceae with one known species (Craurococcus roseus).
