= Saccharibacter =

Saccharibacter floricola

Scientific classification
- Domain: Bacteria
- Kingdom: Pseudomonadati
- Phylum: Pseudomonadota
- Class: Alphaproteobacteria
- Order: Rhodospirillales
- Family: Acetobacteraceae
- Genus: Saccharibacter; Jojima et al. 2004

Type species
- Saccharibacter floricola

Species
- S. floricola

Genus of bacteria

Saccharibacter is a bacterial genus from the family of Acetobacteraceae. Up to now there is only one species of this genus known (Saccharibacter floricola).
