= Acidisoma =

Scientific classification
- Domain: Bacteria
- Kingdom: Pseudomonadati
- Phylum: Pseudomonadota
- Class: Alphaproteobacteria
- Order: Rhodospirillales
- Family: Acetobacteraceae
- Genus: Acidisoma; Belova et al., 2009

Type species
- A. tundrae Belova et al., 2009

Genus of bacteria

Acidisoma is a genus in the phylum Pseudomonadota (Bacteria). It contains two species, Acidisoma tundrae and Acidisoma sibiricum, both two acidophilic (pH 3.0–7.6) and psychrotolerant (2–30 °C) bacteria with poly-β-hydroxybutyrate granules, isolated from acidic Sphagnum-dominated tundra and Siberian wetlands in Russia.

== Etymology ==
The name Acidisoma derives from:
Neo-Latin noun acidum (from Latin adjective acidus -a -um, sour, tart, acid), an acid; Greek neuter gender noun soma (σῶμα), body; Neo-Latin neuter gender noun Acidisoma, an acid (-requiring) body.

== See also ==
- Bacterial taxonomy
- Microbiology
