= Belnapia rosea =

Scientific classification
- Domain: Bacteria
- Kingdom: Pseudomonadati
- Phylum: Pseudomonadota
- Class: Alphaproteobacteria
- Order: Rhodospirillales
- Family: Acetobacteraceae
- Genus: Belnapia
- Species: B. rosea

Binomial name
- Belnapia rosea Jin et al. 2012

Type strain
- CPCC 100156, CGMCC 1.10758, CPCC 100156, DSM 23312

Species of bacterium

Belnapia rosea is a bacterium from the genus Belnapia which has been isolated from forest soil on Hainan Island in China.
