= Pelagibius =

Scientific classification
- Domain: Bacteria
- Kingdom: Pseudomonadati
- Phylum: Pseudomonadota
- Class: Alphaproteobacteria
- Order: Rhodospirillales
- Family: Rhodovibrionaceae
- Genus: Pelagibius; Choi et al. 2009

Type species
- Pelagibius litoralis

Species
- P. litoralis

Genus of bacteria

Pelagibius is a Gram-negative and strictly aerobic genus of bacteria from the family Rhodovibrionaceae with one known species (Pelagibius litoralis). Pelagibius litoralis has been isolated from coastal seawater from Korea.
