= Roseomonas chloroacetimidivorans =

Scientific classification
- Domain: Bacteria
- Kingdom: Pseudomonadati
- Phylum: Pseudomonadota
- Class: Alphaproteobacteria
- Order: Rhodospirillales
- Family: Acetobacteraceae
- Genus: Roseomonas
- Species: R. chloroacetimidivorans

Binomial name
- Roseomonas chloroacetimidivorans Chu 2016

Species of bacterium

Roseomonas chloroacetimidivorans is a species of Gram negative, strictly aerobic, coccobacilli-shaped, light red-colored bacterium. It was first isolated from activated sludge from an herbicide-manufacturing wastewater treatment facility in Jiangsu province, China, and the species was first proposed in 2016. The species name comes from Latin vorans (devouring) and the herbicide chloroacetamide, referring to the type of herbicide waterwater from which the species was first isolated.

The optimum growth temperature for R. chloroacetimidivorans is 25-30 °C, but can grow in the 12-37 °C range. The optimum pH is 7.5, and can grow in pH 6.0-9.0.
