= Belnapia =

Scientific classification
- Domain: Bacteria
- Kingdom: Pseudomonadati
- Phylum: Pseudomonadota
- Class: Alphaproteobacteria
- Order: Rhodospirillales
- Family: Acetobacteraceae
- Genus: Belnapia; Reddy et al. 2006

Species
- Belnapia arida Belnapia moabensis Belnapia mucosa Belnapia rosea Belnapia soli

Genus of bacteria

Belnapia is a genus of bacteria from the family Acetobacteraceae.
