= Terasakiella salincola =

Scientific classification
- Domain: Bacteria
- Kingdom: Pseudomonadati
- Phylum: Pseudomonadota
- Class: Alphaproteobacteria
- Order: Rhodospirillales
- Family: Terasakiellaceae
- Genus: Terasakiella
- Species: T. salincola

Binomial name
- Terasakiella salincola Yoon and Kang 2018

Type strain
- KCCM 90274, NBRC 112846, strain KMU-80

Species of bacterium

Terasakiella salincola is a Gram-negative, S-shaped, facultatively anaerobic and motile bacterium species from the genus Terasakiella which has been isolated from seawater from Korea.
