= R. aquatica =

R. aquatica may refer to:

- Roseomonas aquatica, a species of bacteria
- Rotula aquatica, a species of flowering plant
