= Roseomonas aquatica =

Scientific classification
- Domain: Bacteria
- Kingdom: Pseudomonadati
- Phylum: Pseudomonadota
- Class: Alphaproteobacteria
- Order: Rhodospirillales
- Family: Acetobacteraceae
- Genus: Roseomonas
- Species: R. aquatica

Binomial name
- Roseomonas aquatica Gallego 2006

Species of bacterium

Roseomonas aquatica is a species of Gram negative, strictly aerobic, coccobacilli-shaped, pale pink-colored bacterium. It was first isolated from drinking water from Seville, Spain. The species name is derived from the Latin aquatica (found in water, aquatic).

The optimum growth temperature for R. aquatica is 25-28 °C, but can grow in the 15-35 °C range. The optimum pH is 7.0, and can grow in pH 5.0-9.0.
