= L. rosea =

L. rosea may refer to:

- Laguncularia rosea, a plant species in the genus Laguncularia
- Lapageria rosea, the copihue, Chilean bellflower or Lapageria, a plant species

== See also ==
- Rosea (disambiguation)
