= Acidomonas =

Scientific classification
- Domain: Bacteria
- Kingdom: Pseudomonadati
- Phylum: Pseudomonadota
- Class: Alphaproteobacteria
- Order: Rhodospirillales
- Family: Acetobacteraceae
- Genus: Acidomonas; Uhlig et al. 1986) Urakami et al. 1989

Type species
- A. methanolica

Genus of bacteria

Acidomonas is a genus in the phylum Pseudomonadota (Bacteria). The genus contains single species, namely A. methanolica, formerly known as Acetobacter methanolicus

== Etymology ==
The name Acidomonas derives from:
Latin adjective acidus, sour, acid; Latin feminine gender noun monas (μονάς), nominally meaning "a unit", but in effect meaning a bacterium; Neo-Latin feminine gender noun acidomonas, acidophilic monad.

The specific epithet methanolica derives from Neo-Latin neuter gender noun methanol, methanol; Latin suff. -icus -a -um, suffix used in adjectives with the sense of belonging to; Neo-Latin feminine gender adjective methanolica, relating to methanol.

Members of the genus Acidomonas can be referred to as acidomonad (viz. Trivialisation of names).

== See also ==
- Bacterial taxonomy
- Microbiology
