= Kozakia =

Scientific classification
- Domain: Bacteria
- Kingdom: Pseudomonadati
- Phylum: Pseudomonadota
- Class: Alphaproteobacteria
- Order: Rhodospirillales
- Family: Acetobacteraceae
- Genus: Kozakia; Lisdiyanti et al. 2002

Type species
- Kozakia baliensis

Species
- K. baliensis

Genus of bacteria

Kozakia is a genus of bacteria from the family of Acetobacteraceae. Up to now there is only one species of this genus known (Kozakia baliensis).
