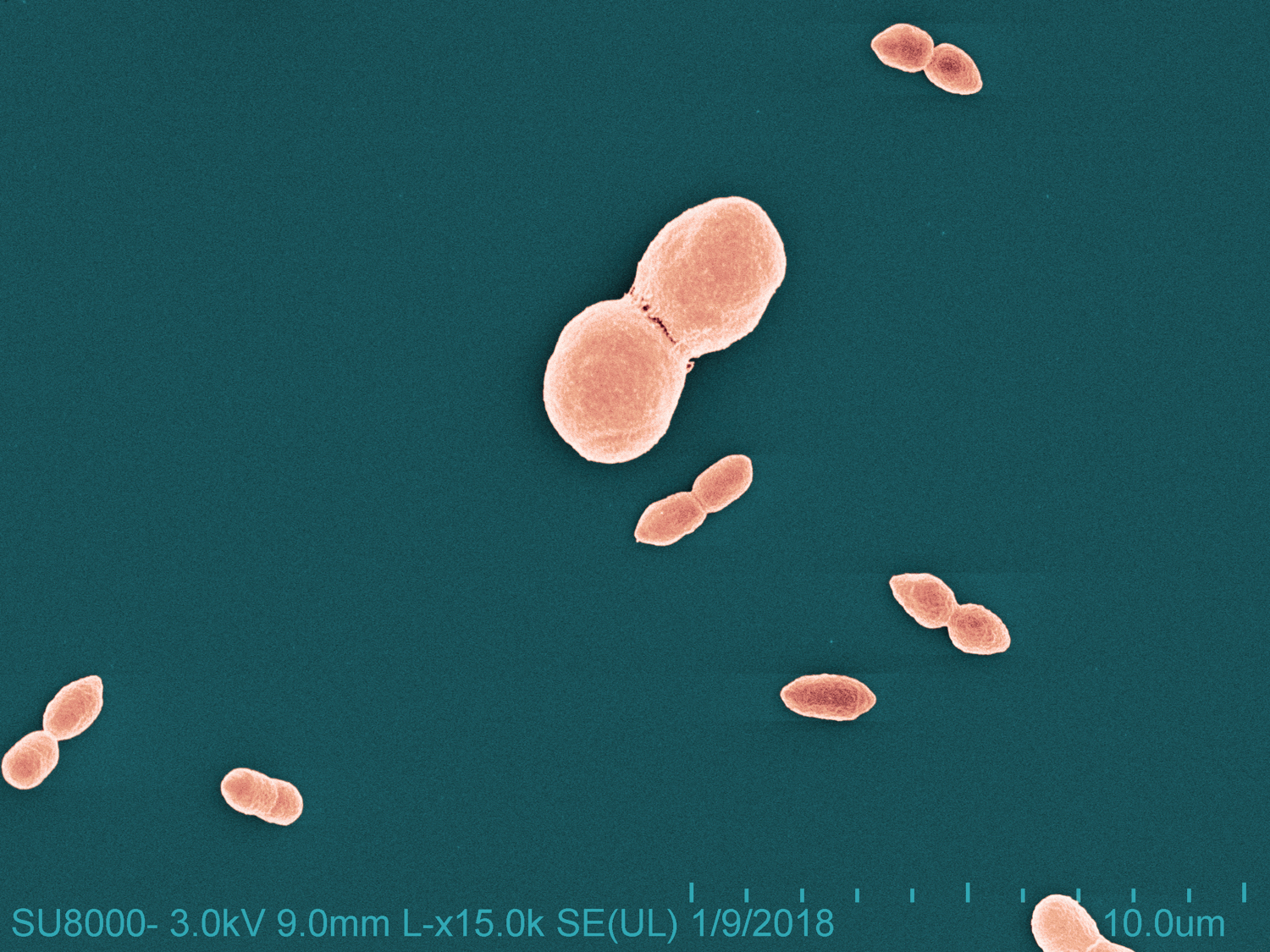

Scientific classification
- Domain: Bacteria
- Kingdom: Pseudomonadati
- Phylum: Pseudomonadota
- Class: Alphaproteobacteria
- Order: Rhodospirillales
- Family: Acetobacteraceae
- Genus: Roseomonas
- Species: R. mucosa

Binomial name
- Roseomonas mucosa Han 2003

= Roseomonas mucosa =

Species of bacterium

Roseomonas mucosa is a species of Gram negative, strictly aerobic, coccobacilli-shaped, pink-pigmented bacterium. It was first isolated from blood in 2000. The new species name was first proposed in 2003 and derives from Latin mucosa (mucous, slimy), referring to the muccoid, almost runny bacterial colonies. During a survey of 36 strains of Roseomonas, R. mucosa was the most common species isolated.

Primary research has suggested a role for skin commensal bacteria in atopic dermatitis, also known as eczema. Research done in conjunction with National Institute of Allergy and Infectious Diseases led to the approval of an over the counter probiotic containing a strain of R. mucosa called RSM 2015 under the brand name Skinesa Defensin.
