= Thalassocola =

Scientific classification
- Domain: Bacteria
- Kingdom: Pseudomonadati
- Phylum: Pseudomonadota
- Class: Alphaproteobacteria
- Order: Rhodospirillales
- Family: Kiloniellaceae
- Genus: Thalassocola; Lin et al. 2015

Type species
- Thalassocola ureilytica

Species
- T. ureilytica

Genus of bacteria

Thalassocola is a genus of bacteria from the order of Rhodospirillales, with one known species (Thalassocola ureilytica).
