= Ameyamaea =

Scientific classification
- Domain: Bacteria
- Kingdom: Pseudomonadati
- Phylum: Pseudomonadota
- Class: Alphaproteobacteria
- Order: Rhodospirillales
- Family: Acetobacteraceae
- Genus: Ameyamaea; Yukphan et al. 2010
- Species: A. chiangmaiensis

Binomial name
- Ameyamaea chiangmaiensis Yukphan et al. 2010

Genus of bacteria

Ameyamaea is a genus in the phylum Pseudomonadota (Bacteria).

== Etymology ==
The name Ameyamaea derives from: New Latin feminine gender noun Ameyamaea, named after Dr. Minoru Ameyama, Professor Emeritus of Yamaguchi University, Yamaguchi, Japan, who contributed to studies of acetic acid bacteria, especially their biochemical and systematic studies.

== Species ==
The genus contains a single species, namely Ameyamaea chiangmaiensis ( Yukphan et al. 2010, (type species of the genus).; New Latin feminine gender adjective chiangmaiensis, of or belonging to Chiang Mai, Thailand, where the type strain was isolated.)
