= Acidocella =

Scientific classification
- Domain: Bacteria
- Kingdom: Pseudomonadati
- Phylum: Pseudomonadota
- Class: Alphaproteobacteria
- Order: Rhodospirillales
- Family: Acetobacteraceae
- Genus: Acidocella; Kishimoto et al. 1996

Type species
- A. facilis

Genus of bacteria

Acidocella is a genus in the phylum Pseudomonadota (Bacteria). Its members are acidophilic.

== Etymology ==
The name Acidocella derives from Neo-Latin acidum (from Latin acidus, sour), an acid; Latin cella, a store-room, a chamber and, in biology, a cell; giving Acidocella, an acid (-requiring) cell.

== Species ==
The genus contains:

- A. aluminiidurans Kimoto et al. 2010
- A. aminolytica (Kishimoto et al. 1994) Kishimoto et al. 1996,, formerly a member of the genus Acidiphilium
- A. aromatica Jones et al. 2013
- A. facilis (Wichlacz et al. 1986) Kishimoto et al. 1996, type species of the genus, formerly a member of the genus Acidiphilium

== See also ==
- Bacterial taxonomy
- Microbiology
