= Roseomonas =

Scientific classification
- Domain: Bacteria
- Kingdom: Pseudomonadati
- Phylum: Pseudomonadota
- Class: Alphaproteobacteria
- Order: Rhodospirillales
- Family: Acetobacteraceae
- Genus: Roseomonas; Rihs 1993

Type species
- Roseomonas gilardii

Species
- R. aeriglobus R. aerilata R. aerofrigidensis R. aerophila R. aestuarii R. aceris R. alkaliterrae R. aquatica R. arctica R. arcticisoli R. cervicalis R. chloroacetimidivorans R. eburnea R. elaeocarpi R. frigidaquae R. gilardii R. hibiscisoli R. lacus R. ludipueritiae R. mucosa R. musae R. nepalensis R. oryzae R. pecuniae R. rhizosphaerae R. riguiloci R. rosea R. rubra R. sediminicola R. soli R. stagni R. suffusca R. terrae R. terricola R. tokyonensis R. vinacea R. wooponensis

Genus of bacteria

Roseomonas is a genus of Gram negative bacteria. The cells are coccoid rods when viewed microscopically. Certain species are known to be opportunistic infections for humans.

== Background ==
The first species isolated had pink colonies when grown on agar, which led to the naming of the genus (from Latin roseus, pink). "Roseomonas species have been isolated frequently from blood, wounds, exudates, abscesses and genitourinary specimens," and have been isolated from environmental sources. Roseomonas can cause bacteremia in humans, especially in immunocompromised patients. While uncommon, the reported rate of Roseomonas infection may be lower due to difficulty in detection of the bacteria in clinical settings.

The first species of Roseomonas were identified when 42 strains of pink-pigmented bacteria from various clinical sources were examined. While similar to characteristics of genus Methylobacterium, the strains were found to contain three new species of a previously unidentified genus, which led to the creation of genus Roseomonas.

Almost all species of Roseomonas are mesophiles. However, R. alkaliterrae is a thermophile, with an optimum growth range of 40-50 °C. Six species are psychrotrophic (i.e. can grow at or below 7 °C): R. aerilata, R. aerophila, R. alkaliterrae, R. arctica, R. oryzae, and R. vinacea.

== Reclassified species ==
R. ludipueritiae and R. rosea were originally classified as Teichococcus ludipueritiae and Muricoccus roseus respectively, but further study on the organisms led to them being reclassified in genus Roseomonas.

Roseomonas fauriae was one of the first species classified as Roseomonas. However, further studies found that R. fauriae was a strain of Azospirillum brasilense, and did not belong in the genus Roseomonas.

== Distribution ==
The original species of Roseomonas, Roseomonas gilardii, R. mucosa, and R. cervicalis were first isolated from blood and human infections, and were likely opportunistic infections. Further discoveries of Roseomonas species were from a variety of environmental sources, including soil, freshwater sediment, plants, water, air, and environmental surfaces. The following is a list of locations from which the species were first isolated:

Air

- R. aeriglobus
- R. aerilata
- R. aerofrigidensis
- R. aerophila

Freshwater sediment

- R. chloroacetimidivorans
- R. eburnea
- R. frigidaquae
- R. riguiloci
- R. tokyonensis
- R. wooponensis

Plants

- R. aceris
- R. elaeocarpi
- R. musae

Soil

- R. alkaliterrae
- R. arctica
- R. arcticisoli
- R. hibiscisoli
- R. nepalensis
- R. oryzae
- R. rhizosphaerae
- R. soli
- R. terrae
- R. terricola
- R. vinacea

Surfaces

- R. ludipueritiae
- R. pecuniae
- R. rosea

Water

- R. aestuarii
- R. aquatica
- R. lacus
- R. rubra
- R. sediminicola
- R. stagni
- R. suffusca

== Colony color ==
Most species of Roseomonas form pink to light red pigmented colonies when grown on culture medium. However, some species form colonies of different colors:

Red

- R. nepalensis
- R. rubra
- R. vinacea

White

- R. eburnea
- R. musae
- R. soli

Yellow, orange, or brown

- R. aestuarii (orange)
- R. suffusca (light brown)
- R. ludipueritiae (pale yellow)
- R. terrae (pale yellow)
