= Roseomonas gilardii =

Scientific classification
- Domain: Bacteria
- Kingdom: Pseudomonadati
- Phylum: Pseudomonadota
- Class: Alphaproteobacteria
- Order: Rhodospirillales
- Family: Acetobacteraceae
- Genus: Roseomonas
- Species: R. gilardii

Binomial name
- Roseomonas gilardii Rhis 1993

Species of bacterium

Roseomonas gilardii is a species of Gram negative, strictly aerobic, coccobacilli-shaped, pink-pigmented bacterium. It is the type species of the genus Roseomonas. The new species was among the first Roseomonas species proposed in 1993, and is named for "Gerald L. Gilardi for his many contributions to bacteriology and, specifically, for his contributions in the area of glucose-nonfermenting gram-negative rods." R. gilardii is pathogenic for humans, causing bacteremia and other infections.

There are two subspecies of R. gilardii: R. g. subsp. gilardii and R. g. subsp. rosea.
