= E. roseus =

E. roseus may refer to:

- Eleutherodactylus roseus, a frog species endemic to Colombia
- Eupsophus roseus, a frog species endemic to Chile

== See also ==
- Roseus (disambiguation)
