= Acidicaldus =

Scientific classification
- Domain: Bacteria
- Kingdom: Pseudomonadati
- Phylum: Pseudomonadota
- Class: Alphaproteobacteria
- Order: Rhodospirillales
- Family: Acetobacteraceae
- Genus: Acidicaldus; Johnson et al. 2006

Type species
- A. organivorans

Genus of bacteria

Acidicaldus is a genus in the phylum Pseudomonadota (Bacteria), whose sole member is an acidophilic thermophile.

== Etymology ==
The name Acidicaldus derives from: Neo-Latin acidum (from Latin adjective acidus, sour), an acid; Latin caldus, warm, hot; giving Acidicaldus, a (moderately) thermophilic acid-requiring microorganism.

== Species ==
The genus contains single species, namely A. organivorans (corrig. Johnson et al. 2006, (type species of the genus); Neo-Latin organum, organic compound; Latin vorans, devouring; giving organivorans, devouring organic compounds.)

== See also ==
- Bacterial taxonomy
- Microbiology
