= A. roseus =

A. roseus may refer to:

- Agaricus roseus, a synonym for Mycena rosella and for Mycena rosea
- Aleurodiscus roseus, a synonym for Laeticorticium roseum
- Araneus roseus, a synonym for Micrommata virescens
- Atylus roseus, a synonym for Isopogon dubius

== See also ==
- Roseus (disambiguation)
