= Terasakiella brassicae =

Scientific classification
- Domain: Bacteria
- Kingdom: Pseudomonadati
- Phylum: Pseudomonadota
- Class: Alphaproteobacteria
- Order: Rhodospirillales
- Family: Terasakiellaceae
- Genus: Terasakiella
- Species: T. brassicae

Binomial name
- Terasakiella brassicae Han et al. 2016

Type strain
- CGMCC 1.15254, KCTC 42652, B3

Species of bacterium

Terasakiella brassicae is a Gram-negative, aerobic and motile bacterium species from the genus Terasakiella which has been isolated from wastewater.
