= Pyrodictium =

Scientific classification
- Domain: Archaea
- Kingdom: Thermoproteati
- Phylum: Thermoproteota
- Class: Thermoprotei
- Order: Desulfurococcales
- Family: Pyrodictiaceae
- Genus: Pyrodictium; Stetter, König & Stackebrandt 1984

Type species
- Pyrodictium occultum Stetter, König & Stackebrandt 1984

Species
- P. abyssi; P. brockii; P. delaneyi; P. occultum

Genus of archaea

Pyrodictium is a genus in the family Pyrodictiaceae. It is a genus of submarine hyperthermophilic Archaea whose optimal growth temperature range is 80 to 110°C. They have a unique cell structure involving a network of cannulae and flat, disk-shaped cells. Pyrodictium are found in the porous walls of deep-sea vents where the temperatures inside get as high as 400°C, while the outside marine environment is typically 3°C. Pyrodictium is apparently able to adapt morphologically to this type of hot–cold habitat.

== Genome structure ==
Much research has been done on the genetics of Pyrodictium in order to understand its ability to survive and even thrive in such extreme temperatures. The thermal stability of Pyrodictum occultum's isolate tRNA has been analyzed, indicating that modifications in the nucleosides allow the organism to withstand temperatures well over 100°C.

== Cell structure and metabolism ==
Pyrodictium cells have been studied by scientists, in part because they are a model of thermal stability. The cells' structure is a flat, irregular disk, 300 to 2500 nanometres in diameter and up to 300 nanometres in width. The cells grow in unique flake-like shapes held together by a network of hollow cannulae (tubules). The cannulae branch out and connect with other cells, greatly extending their range. While the exact reason for this morphology is unknown, it is likely that the range of motion provided by the cannulae allow the cells to move freely when by the thermal energy from the extreme heat of the organisms's environment. The large size range of the cells may allow Pyrodictium to inhabit a variety of pores in the deep-sea vent walls.

== Ecology ==
Members of Pyrodictium are located in deep-sea hydrothermal vents, first discovered in 1979. Their ecological significance remains a mystery because of the difficulty in collecting samples which may yield data on the abundance and diversity of these extremophiles.

== Phylogeny ==
The currently accepted taxonomy is based on the List of Prokaryotic names with Standing in Nomenclature (LPSN) and National Center for Biotechnology Information (NCBI).

16S rRNA based LTP_07_2026

- - Pyrodictium abyssi Pley and Stetter 1991
  - - - Hyperthermus Zillig et al. 1991
      - Pyrodictium delaneyi Lin et al. 2016
    - - Pyrofollis Miyazaki et al. 2024
      - - Pyrodictium
          - P. brockii Stetter et al. 1984
          - P. occultum Stetter et al. 1984

53 marker proteins based GTDB 11-RS232

- - Hyperthermus
  - - Pyrofollis
    - - Pyrodictium
        - P. occultum
        - - P. abyssi
          - P. delaneyi

== See also ==
- List of Archaea genera
