= R. oryzae =

R. oryzae may refer to:

- Rhizopus oryzae, a species of fungus
- Roseomonas oryzae, a species of Gram-negative bacteria
