= Roseomonas rubra =

Scientific classification
- Domain: Bacteria
- Kingdom: Pseudomonadati
- Phylum: Pseudomonadota
- Class: Alphaproteobacteria
- Order: Rhodospirillales
- Family: Acetobacteraceae
- Genus: Roseomonas
- Species: R. rubra

Binomial name
- Roseomonas rubra Subhash 2016

Species of bacterium

Roseomonas rubra is a species of Gram negative, strictly aerobic, coccobacilli-shaped, red-colored bacterium. It was first isolated from lagoon sediments located near North Carolina State University in 2015, and the species was first proposed in 2016. The species name comes from Latin rubra (red), referring to the color that the bacterial colonies form.

Roseomonas suffusca was also first isolated during the same survey of lagoon sediments.

The optimum growth temperature for R. rubra is 30-37 °C, but can grow in the 12-45 °C range. The optimum pH is 6.5-7.5, and can grow in pH 6.3-9.0.
