= M. roseus =

M. roseus may refer to:

- Maoricolpus roseus, a sea snail species found only in New Zealand
- Micrococcus roseus, a gram positive bacterium species
- Roseomonas rosea, formerly Muricoccus roseus, a gram negative bacterium species

== See also ==
- Roseus (disambiguation)
