= Pyrolobus =

Scientific classification
- Domain: Archaea
- Kingdom: Thermoproteati
- Phylum: Thermoproteota
- Class: Thermoprotei
- Order: Desulfurococcales
- Family: Pyrodictiaceae
- Genus: Pyrolobus; Blöch, Rachel, Burggraf, Hafenbradl, Jannasch & Stetter 1999

Type species
- Pyrolobus fumarii Blöch et al. 1999

Species
- P. fumarii

Genus of archaea

Pyrolobus is a genus of archaeans in the family Pyrodictiaceae.
