= O. roseus =

O. roseus may refer to:

- Odontamblyopus roseus, an eel goby species found in muddy-bottomed coastal waters along the west coast of India
- Opisthopatus roseus, the pink velvet worm, a species in the Phylum Onychophora
- Osedax roseus, a polychaete worm which feeds upon the bones found in the carcasses of whales

== See also ==
- Roseus (disambiguation)
