= Thalassobaculaceae =

Scientific classification
- Domain: Bacteria
- Kingdom: Pseudomonadati
- Phylum: Pseudomonadota
- Class: Alphaproteobacteria
- Order: Rhodospirillales
- Family: Thalassobaculaceae; Hördt et al. 2020

Genera
- Nisaea Urios et al. 2008; Oceanibaculum Lai et al. 2009; Thalassobaculum Zhang et al. 2008

Family of bacteria

Thalassobaculaceae is a family of bacteria from the order Rhodospirillales.
