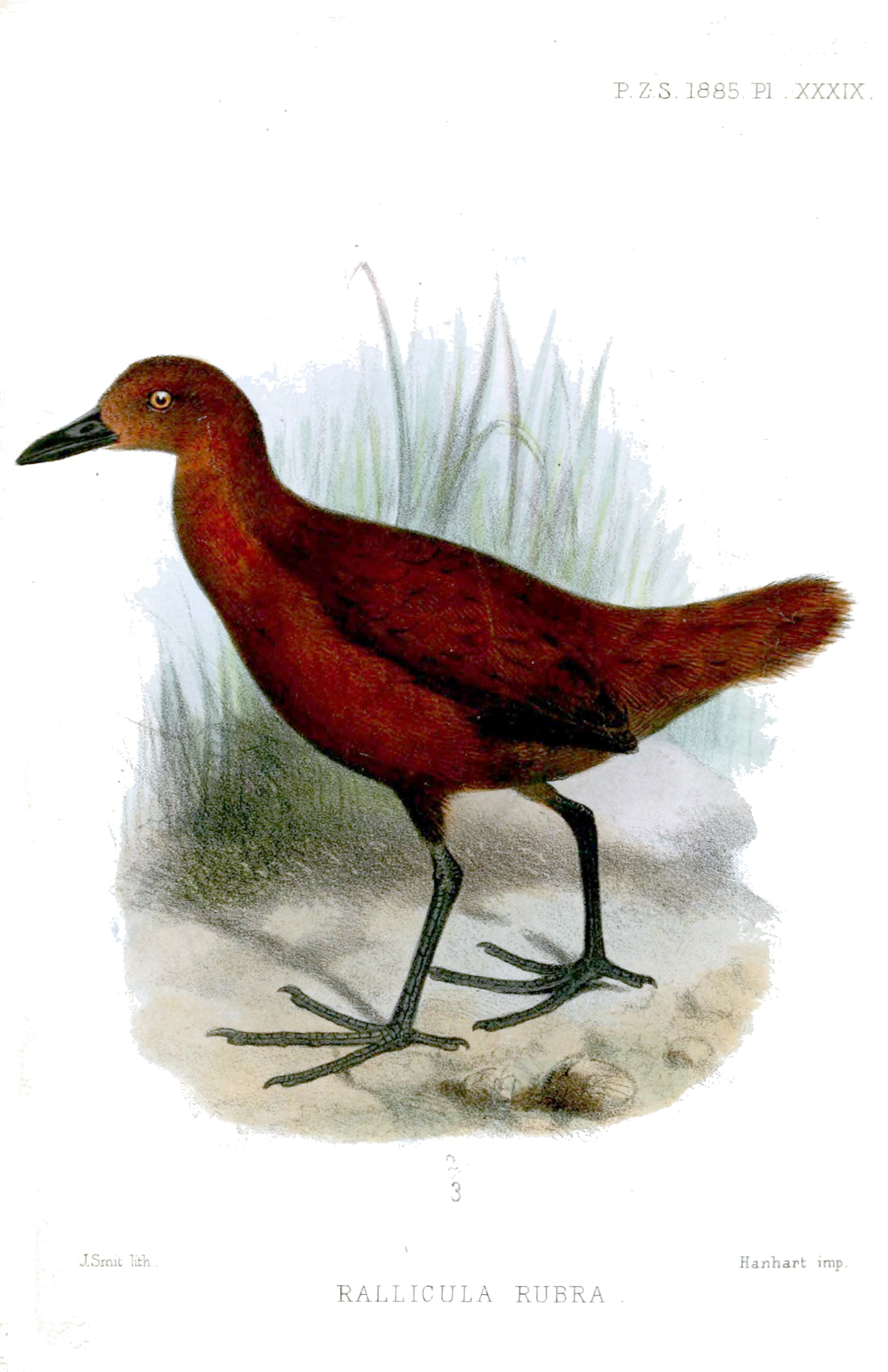
- Chestnut forest rail, Rallicula rubra

Scientific classification
- Kingdom: Animalia
- Phylum: Chordata
- Class: Aves
- Order: Gruiformes
- Family: Sarothruridae
- Genus: Rallicula; Schlegel, 1871

Type species
- Rallicula rubra Schlegel, 1871

Species
- see text

= Rallicula =

Genus of birds

Rallicula is a genus of bird in the family Sarothruridae. It contains four species endemic to the island of New Guinea.

- Chestnut forest rail, Rallicula rubra
- White-striped forest rail, Rallicula leucospila
- Forbes's forest rail, Rallicula forbesi
- Mayr's forest rail, Rallicula mayri
