= H. roseus =

H. roseus may refer to:

- Hydrocoloeus roseus, the Ross's gull, a bird species
- Hypomyces roseus, a synonym for Trichothecium roseum, a fungus species

== See also ==
- Roseus (disambiguation)
