= Stellaceae =

Scientific classification
- Domain: Bacteria
- Kingdom: Pseudomonadati
- Phylum: Pseudomonadota
- Class: Alphaproteobacteria
- Order: Rhodospirillales
- Family: Stellaceae; Hördt et al. 2020

Genera
- Constrictibacter Yamada et al. 2011; Stella Vasilyeva 1985

Family of bacteria

Stellaceae is a family of bacteria from the order Rhodospirillales.
