= Pyrodictium abyssi =

Scientific classification
- Domain: Archaea
- Kingdom: Thermoproteati
- Phylum: Thermoproteota
- Class: Thermoprotei
- Order: Desulfurococcales
- Family: Pyrodictiaceae
- Genus: Pyrodictium
- Species: P. abyssi

Binomial name
- Pyrodictium abyssi Pley and Stetter 1991

Species of archaeon

Pyrodictium abyssi is a species of heterotrophic marine archaeal hyperthermophile that can grow at 110 °C (230 °F). Its type strain is AV2 (DSM 6158).
