= Roseomonas rhizosphaerae =

Scientific classification
- Domain: Bacteria
- Kingdom: Pseudomonadati
- Phylum: Pseudomonadota
- Class: Alphaproteobacteria
- Order: Rhodospirillales
- Family: Acetobacteraceae
- Genus: Roseomonas
- Species: R. rhizosphaerae

Binomial name
- Roseomonas rhizosphaerae Chen 2014

Species of bacterium

Roseomonas rhizosphaerae is a species of Gram negative, strictly aerobic, coccobacilli-shaped, pink-colored bacterium. It was first isolated from soil under long-term application of triazofos in Yangzhou, Jiangsu province, China, and the species was first proposed in 2011. The species name refers to the rhizosphere from which it was first isolated.

R. rhizosphaerae can degrade triazofos, an organophosphate pesticide.

The optimum growth temperature for R. rhizosphaerae is 28 °C, but can grow in the 15-40 °C range. The optimum pH is 7.5, and can grow in pH 5.0-8.0.
