= White-striped forest rail =

Conservation status
- Least Concern (IUCN 3.1)

Scientific classification
- Kingdom: Animalia
- Phylum: Chordata
- Class: Aves
- Order: Gruiformes
- Family: Sarothruridae
- Genus: Rallicula
- Species: R. leucospila

Binomial name
- Rallicula leucospila (Salvadori, 1876)

Synonyms
- Rallina leucospila

Species of bird

The white-striped forest rail (Rallicula leucospila), also white-striped forest crake is a species of bird in the family Sarothruridae. It is endemic to West Papua, Indonesia. Its natural habitat is subtropical or tropical moist montane forests. It is threatened by habitat loss.
