= Terasakiella =

Scientific classification
- Domain: Bacteria
- Kingdom: Pseudomonadati
- Phylum: Pseudomonadota
- Class: Alphaproteobacteria
- Order: Rhodospirillales
- Family: Terasakiellaceae; Hördt et al. 2020
- Genus: Terasakiella; Satomi et al. 2002

Type species
- Terasakiella pusilla

Species
- Terasakiella brassicae Han et al. 2016; "Candidatus Terasakiella magnetica" Monteil et al. 2018; Terasakiella pusilla (Terasaki 1973) Satomi et al. 2002; Terasakiella salincola Yoon and Kang 2018

Genus of bacteria

Terasakiella is a genus of bacteria from the order Rhodospirillales.
