= Rhodopila =

Scientific classification
- Domain: Bacteria
- Kingdom: Pseudomonadati
- Phylum: Pseudomonadota
- Class: Alphaproteobacteria
- Order: Rhodospirillales
- Family: Acetobacteraceae
- Genus: Rhodopila; Imhoff et al. 1984
- Species: R. globiformis

Binomial name
- Rhodopila globiformis (Pfennig 1974) Imhoff et al. 1984

Synonyms
- Rhodopseudomonas globiformis Pfennig 1974

Species of bacterium

Rhodopila globiformis is a species of bacteria, formerly known as Rhodopseudomonas globiformis. It is the only species in the genus Rhodopila.It is a motile, spherical organism. Cells can grow between 1.6 and 1.8 μm in diameter. The photopigments consist of bacteriochlorophyll aP and aliphatic methoxylated ketocarotenoids. The organism grows under anaerobic conditions in the light or under microaerophilic conditions in the dark. Biotin, p-aminobenzoic acid and a source of reduced sulfur are required as growth factors in order to cultivate this bacteria. This bacteria possesses a high potential cytochrome c2.
