= Mayr's forest rail =

Conservation status
- Least Concern (IUCN 3.1)

Scientific classification
- Kingdom: Animalia
- Phylum: Chordata
- Class: Aves
- Order: Gruiformes
- Family: Sarothruridae
- Genus: Rallicula
- Species: R. mayri

Binomial name
- Rallicula mayri Hartert, 1930

Synonyms
- Rallina mayri

Species of bird

Mayr's forest rail (Rallicula mayri), also Mayr's forest crake, is a species of bird in the family Sarothruridae. It is found in northern New Guinea.
