= Thalassospiraceae =

Scientific classification
- Domain: Bacteria
- Kingdom: Pseudomonadati
- Phylum: Pseudomonadota
- Class: Alphaproteobacteria
- Order: Rhodospirillales
- Family: Thalassospiraceae; Hördt et al. 2020

Genera
- Magnetospira Williams et al. 2012; Magnetovibrio Bazylinski et al. 2013; Thalassospira López-López et al. 2002; Varunaivibrio Patwardhan and Vetriani 2016

Family of bacteria

Thalassospiraceae is a family of bacteria from the order Rhodospirillales.
