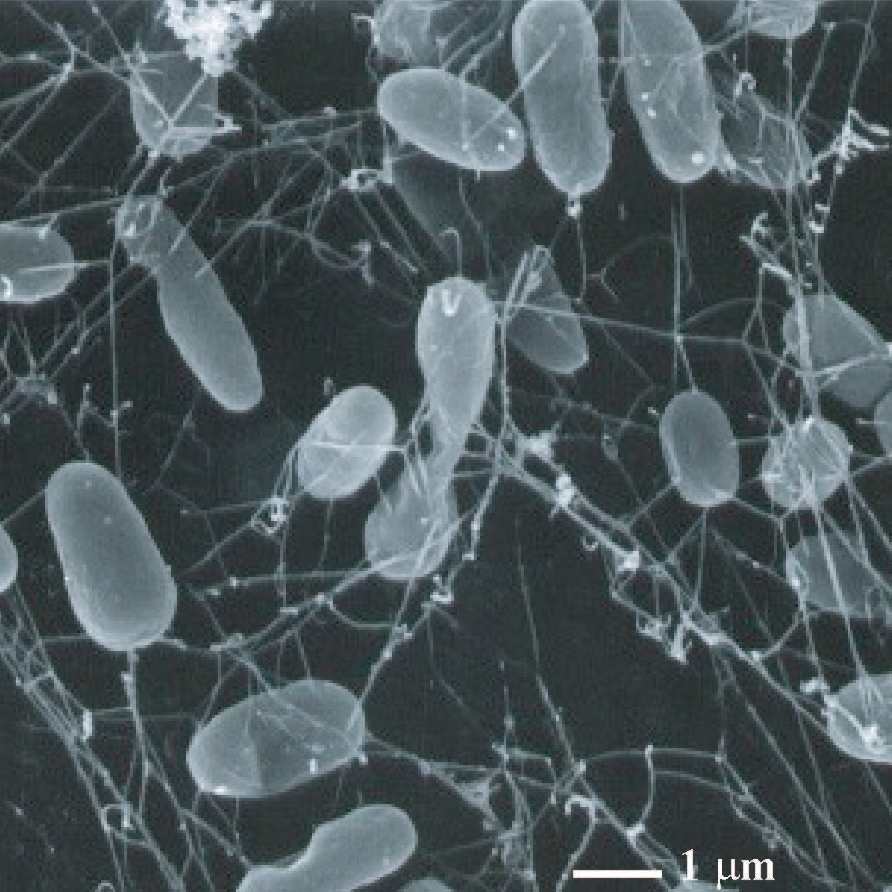

Scientific classification
- Domain: Archaea
- Kingdom: Thermoproteati
- Phylum: Thermoproteota
- Class: Thermoprotei
- Order: Desulfurococcales
- Family: Pyrodictiaceae
- Genus: Pyrolobus
- Species: P. fumarii

Binomial name
- Pyrolobus fumarii Blöch, Rachel, Burggraf, Hafenbradl, Jannasch & Stetter, 1997

= Pyrolobus fumarii =

Species of prokaryote

Pyrolobus fumarii (Latin for "fire lobe of the chimney") is a species of archaea known for living and reproducing at extremely high temperatures that kill most organisms. P. fumarii is known as a hyperthermophile obligately chemolithoautotroph (it cannot use carbon from organic sources). In the simplest terms, this archaea grows best in warm temperatures ranging from 80–115 °C (176–239 °F). It also uses preformed molecules as its energy source rather than light, inorganic as an electron donor, and CO_{2} is used as a carbon source. It was first discovered in a black smoker hydrothermal vent at the Mid-Atlantic Ridge and described in 1996, setting the upper-temperature threshold for known life to exist at 113 °C (235 °F) with an optimal temperature of 106 °C (223 °F), and can survive even higher temperatures (one hour in an autoclave at 121 °C (250 °F)). This species "freezes" or solidifies and ceases growth at temperatures of 90 °C (194 °F) and below.

== Metabolism ==
Pyrolobus fumarii are capable of cellular growth and survival in a temperature range between 90–113 °C (194–235 °F) with their optimum temperature being around 106 °C (223 °F). There are only a few species that are known to survive at this temperature. They require a pH range of around 4 - 6.5 which is relatively more acidic than neutral to grow. Adding onto this for optimal growth and survival of the microbe 1-4% NaCl (10-40 g/L) is needed to maintain the correct osmolarity of the cell. High pressure is not a concern for growth as metabolism was found at 25,000 kPa (250 atm) for 22 hours, but the place where it was discovered (3650 m deep) suggests that it can live at even higher pressures (36,500 kPa (360 atm) at least). An important distinction to be made about this archaea is that it does not grow in media containing acetate, pyruvate, glucose, starch, and elementary sulfur. Possible terminal electron acceptor is nitrate NO^{−}_{3}, (that means that P. fumarii "breathes" nitrate, like humans breathe oxygen, and thus is an anaerobe). Nitrate is not the most desired terminal electron acceptor due to the fact that it has a much smaller ATP yield. A study found that P. fumarii contained capabilities of growing by thiosulfate reduction, however, with NH_{4}Cl present, the archaea growth resulted in a fivefold yield. For P. fumarii reduction of succinyl-CoA, which is used in the process of generating energy in the cell, does not rely on NAD(p)H but instead requires reduced methyl viologen. It is theorized that P. fumarii thermostability is due to the accumulation of unusual organic solutes. One of these solutes is theorized to play a role in di-myo-inositol phosphate (DIP) as it is associated with the heat stress response. Some studies found that a similar archaea species P. furiosus increased 20-fold when under a temperature shift from 95–101 °C (203–214 °F) with the presence of DIP.

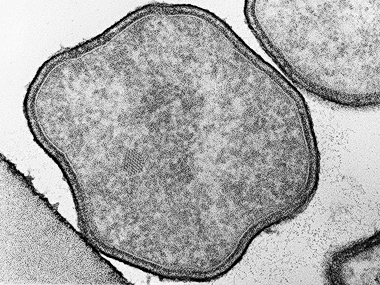
Electron microscope images of Pyrolobus fumarii after Epon embedding and freeze-substitution.

== Structure ==
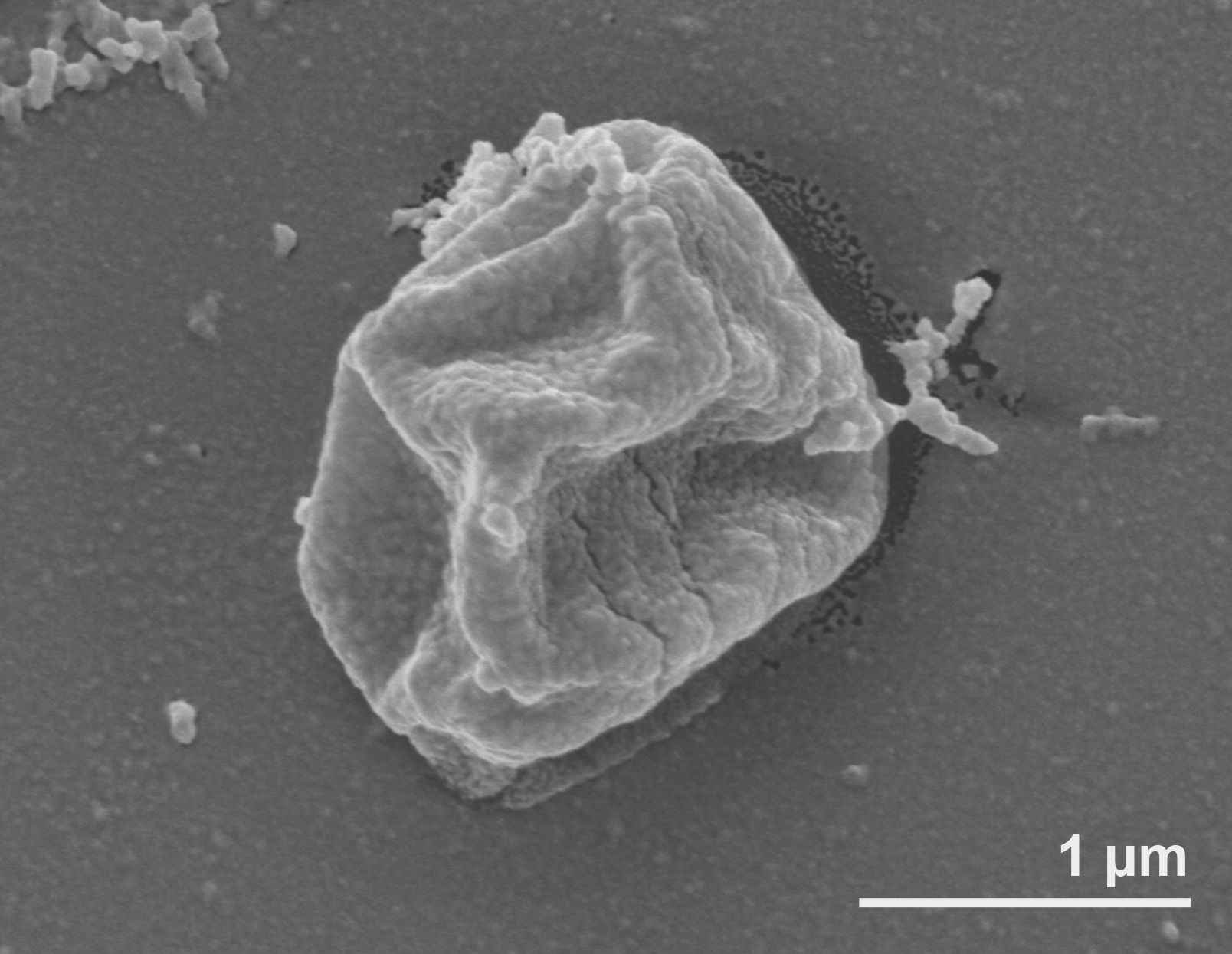
Scanning Electron Micrograph of Pyrolobus fumarii

P. fumarii structure contains an S-layer, commonly found in non-lab prokaryotic strains, which stimulates a pore with a depression in the middle. The archaea also contain a cytoplasmic membrane and periplasmic space. Major core lipids with this strain are uncyclized glycerol-dialkyl-glycerol-tetraether (GDGT) and traces of 2,3-di-o-phytanyl-sn-glycerol (diether). They are described as regularly irregularly shaped cocci meaning they are relatively round and singularly grouped not chained. Shape wise P. fumarii is cocci-shaped however does not form a perfectly round shape instead forms a more lobe shape with a diameter between 0.7 and 2.5 μm.

== Application ==
Understanding the ability of P. fumarii to withstand high temperatures and its genome capabilities to be thermostable and heat-tolerant could lead to many pharmaceutical, agricultural, and industrial applications. Products that could use a thermostable microorganism include agricultural product processing enzymes, bioremediation applications, industrial and consumer product enzymes, and even pharmaceutical applications with where a highly thermostable organism is needed. When working with this culture, it has been advised to work in conditions under 85 °C, as there is no growth for P. fumarii below this temperature. This prevents growth, however it does not kill the archaea. This understanding can be incorporated into laboratory practices when handling the species.
