= P. roseus =

P. roseus may refer to:

- Pericrocotus roseus, the rosy minivet, a bird species
- Phoenicopterus roseus, the greater flamingo, a bird species

== See also ==
- Roseus (disambiguation)
