= Geogemma =

Scientific classification
- Domain: Archaea
- Kingdom: Thermoproteati
- Phylum: Thermoproteota
- Class: Thermoprotei
- Order: Desulfurococcales
- Family: Pyrodictiaceae
- Genus: Geogemma; Kashefi, Holmes & Lovley 2006

Type species
- "Geogemma indica" Kashefi, Holmes & Lovley 2006

Species
- "G. barossii"; "G. indica"; "G. pacifica"

Genus of archaea

Geogemma is a genus of archaeans in the family Pyrodictiaceae.

== See also ==
- List of Archaea genera
