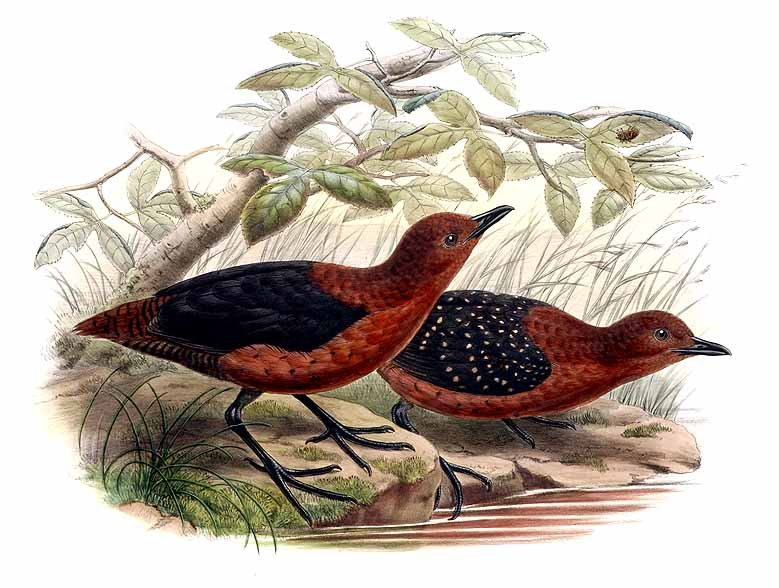

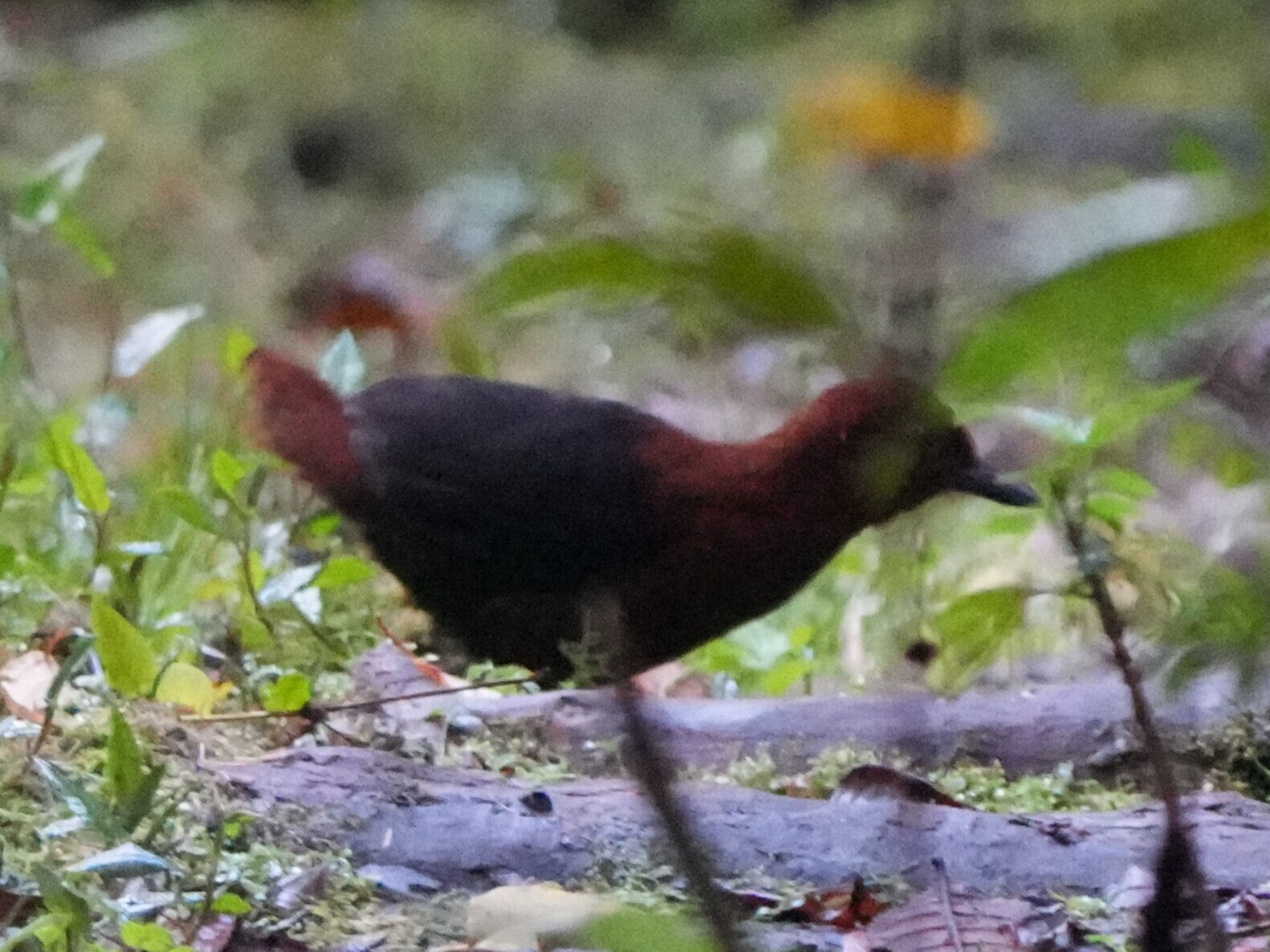

Conservation status
- Least Concern (IUCN 3.1)

Scientific classification
- Kingdom: Animalia
- Phylum: Chordata
- Class: Aves
- Order: Gruiformes
- Family: Sarothruridae
- Genus: Rallicula
- Species: R. forbesi

Binomial name
- Rallicula forbesi Sharpe, 1887

Synonyms
- Rallina forbesi

= Forbes's forest rail =

Species of bird

Forbes's forest rail (Rallicula forbesi) or Forbes's forest crake, is a species of bird in the family Sarothruridae. It is found in New Guinea. Its natural habitats are subtropical or tropical moist lowland forest and subtropical or tropical moist montane forest.
