= Roseus =

Roseus is a Latin adjective meaning rose, rosy or pink.

== Species and cultivars ==
- Roseus, a rosemary cultivar
- Roseus or Pink Snow, an early crocus (Crocus tommasinianus) cultivar

== See also ==
- Rosea (disambiguation)
- A. roseus (disambiguation)
- C. roseus (disambiguation)
- E. roseus (disambiguation)
- H. roseus (disambiguation)
- M. roseus (disambiguation)
- O. roseus (disambiguation)
- P. roseus (disambiguation)
