= C. roseus =

C. roseus may refer to:

- Carpodacus roseus, the Pallas's rosefinch, a bird species
- Catharanthus roseus, the Madagascar periwinkle, a plant species endemic to Madagascar
- Cotoneaster roseus, a plant species native to portions of the Himalayas, Iran, northern and western Pakistan, northwest India and Kashmir

== Synonyms ==
- Cryptochilus roseus, a synonym for Eria rosea, a plant
- Clastes roseus, a synonym for Peucetia viridans, the green lynx spider

== See also ==
- Roseus (disambiguation)
