= Reyranella =

Scientific classification
- Domain: Bacteria
- Kingdom: Pseudomonadati
- Phylum: Pseudomonadota
- Class: Alphaproteobacteria
- Order: Rhodospirillales
- Family: Reyranellaceae; Hördt et al. 2020
- Genus: Reyranella; Pagnier et al. 2011

Species
- Reyranella aquatilis Cui et al. 2017; Reyranella graminifolii Lee and Whang 2014; Reyranella massiliensis Pagnier et al. 2011; Reyranella soli Kim et al. 2013; Reyranella terrae Lee et al. 2017

Family of bacteria

Reyranella is a genus of bacteria in the order Rhodospirillales.
