= Rhodovibrionaceae =

Scientific classification
- Domain: Bacteria
- Kingdom: Pseudomonadati
- Phylum: Pseudomonadota
- Class: Alphaproteobacteria
- Order: Rhodospirillales
- Family: Rhodovibrionaceae; Hördt et al. 2020

Genera
- Aquibaculum Ahn et al. 2024; Fodinicurvata Wang et al. 2009; Limibacillus Kim et al. 2015; Limimonas Amoozegar et al. 2013; Pelagibius Choi et al. 2009; Rhodovibrio (ex Molisch 1907) Imhoff et al. 1998; Tistlia Díaz-Cárdenas et al. 2010

Family of bacteria

The Rhodovibrionaceae are a family of bacteria from the order Rhodospirillales.
