= Hyperthermus =

Scientific classification
- Domain: Archaea
- Kingdom: Thermoproteati
- Phylum: Thermoproteota
- Class: Thermoprotei
- Order: Desulfurococcales
- Family: Pyrodictiaceae
- Genus: Hyperthermus; Zillig, Holz & Wunderl 1991

Type species
- Hyperthermus butylicus Zillig, Holz & Wunderl 1991

Species
- H. butylicus; "H. hephaesti"

Genus of prokaryotes

Hyperthermus is a genus of archaeans in the family Pyrodictiaceae.

== See also ==
- List of Archaea genera
