= Roseomonas wooponensis =

Scientific classification
- Domain: Bacteria
- Kingdom: Pseudomonadati
- Phylum: Pseudomonadota
- Class: Alphaproteobacteria
- Order: Rhodospirillales
- Family: Acetobacteraceae
- Genus: Roseomonas
- Species: R. wooponensis

Binomial name
- Roseomonas wooponensis Lee 2015

Species of bacterium

Roseomonas wooponensis is a species of Gram negative, strictly aerobic, coccobacilli-shaped, light red-colored bacteria. It was first isolated from freshwater in the Woopo wetland in Changyeong, Gyeongnam Province, South Korea, and the species was proposed in 2015. The species name refers to the Woopo wetland where the species was first isolated.

The optimum growth temperature for R. wooponensis is 35-37 °C, but can grow in the 15-40 °C range. The optimum pH is 7.0, and can grow in pH 6.0-8.0.
