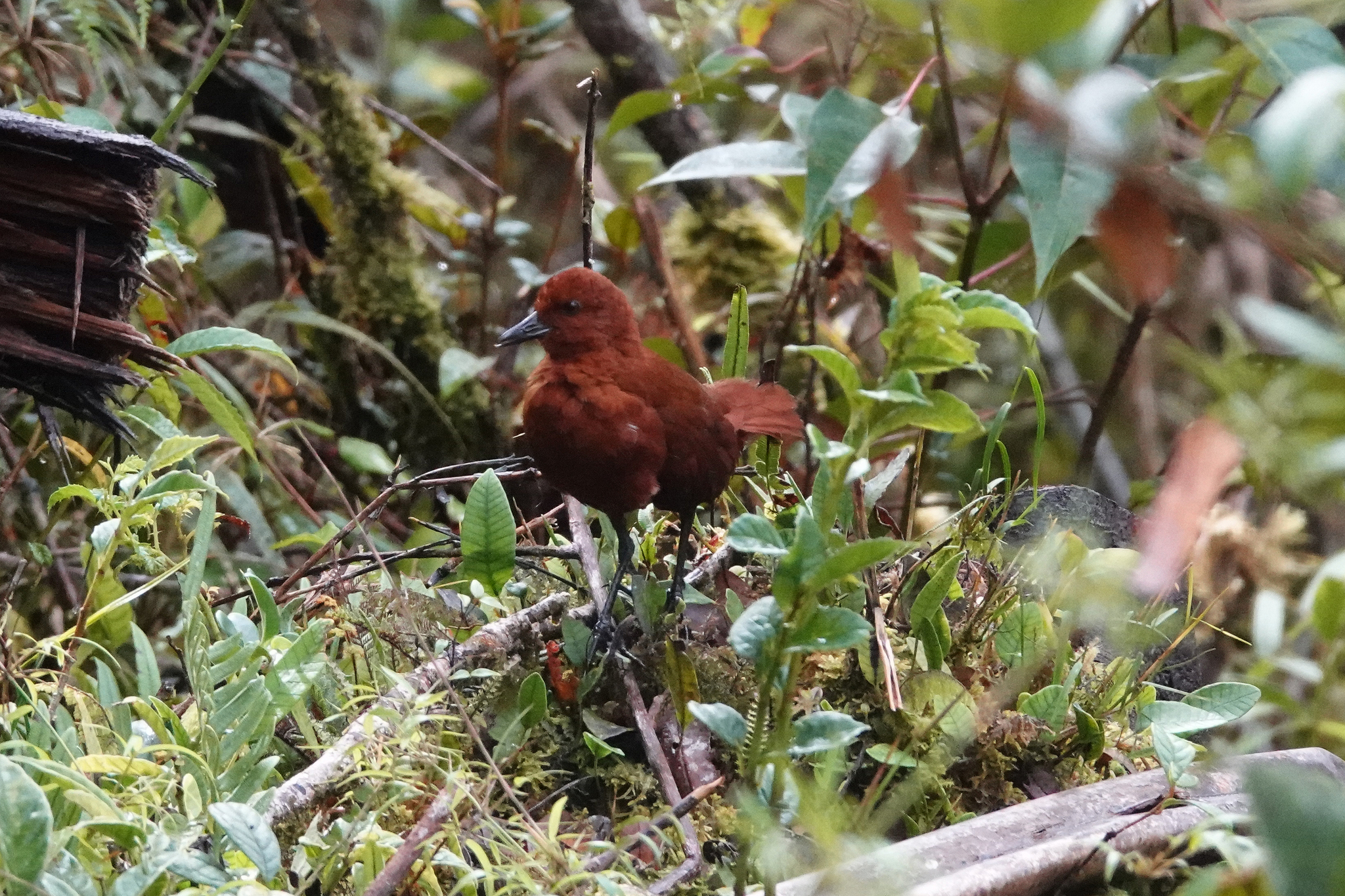

Conservation status
- Least Concern (IUCN 3.1)

Scientific classification
- Kingdom: Animalia
- Phylum: Chordata
- Class: Aves
- Order: Gruiformes
- Family: Sarothruridae
- Genus: Rallicula
- Species: R. rubra

Binomial name
- Rallicula rubra Schlegel, 1871

Synonyms
- Rallina rubra

= Chestnut forest rail =

Species of bird

The chestnut forest rail (Rallicula rubra), also known as the chestnut forest crake, is a species of bird in the family Sarothruridae. It is found in the Arfak Mountains and western-central New Guinea Highlands. Its natural habitat is subtropical or tropical moist montane forests.
