= Roseomonas rosea =

Scientific classification
- Domain: Bacteria
- Kingdom: Pseudomonadati
- Phylum: Pseudomonadota
- Class: Alphaproteobacteria
- Order: Rhodospirillales
- Family: Acetobacteraceae
- Genus: Roseomonas
- Species: R. rosea

Binomial name
- Roseomonas rosea Sanchez-Porro 2009

Species of bacterium

Roseomonas rosea (formerly Muricoccus roseus) is a species of Gram negative, strictly aerobic, coccobacilli-shaped, pink-colored bacteria. It was first isolated from a children's day care center in 1995. Further work on the isolate led to the proposal of a new genus and species, Muricoccus roseus in 2003. Further work on M. roseus found that the species belonged in the genus Roseomonas, and also led to Teichococcus ludipueritiae being reclassified as Roseomonas ludipueritiae in 2009. The new name for the species is Roseomonas rosea. The species name is derived from Latin rosea (pink), referring to the pink color the bacterial colonies will form, which is also a present in most Roseomonas species.

The optimum growth temperature for R. rosea is 30 °C, but can grow in the 15-45 °C range.
