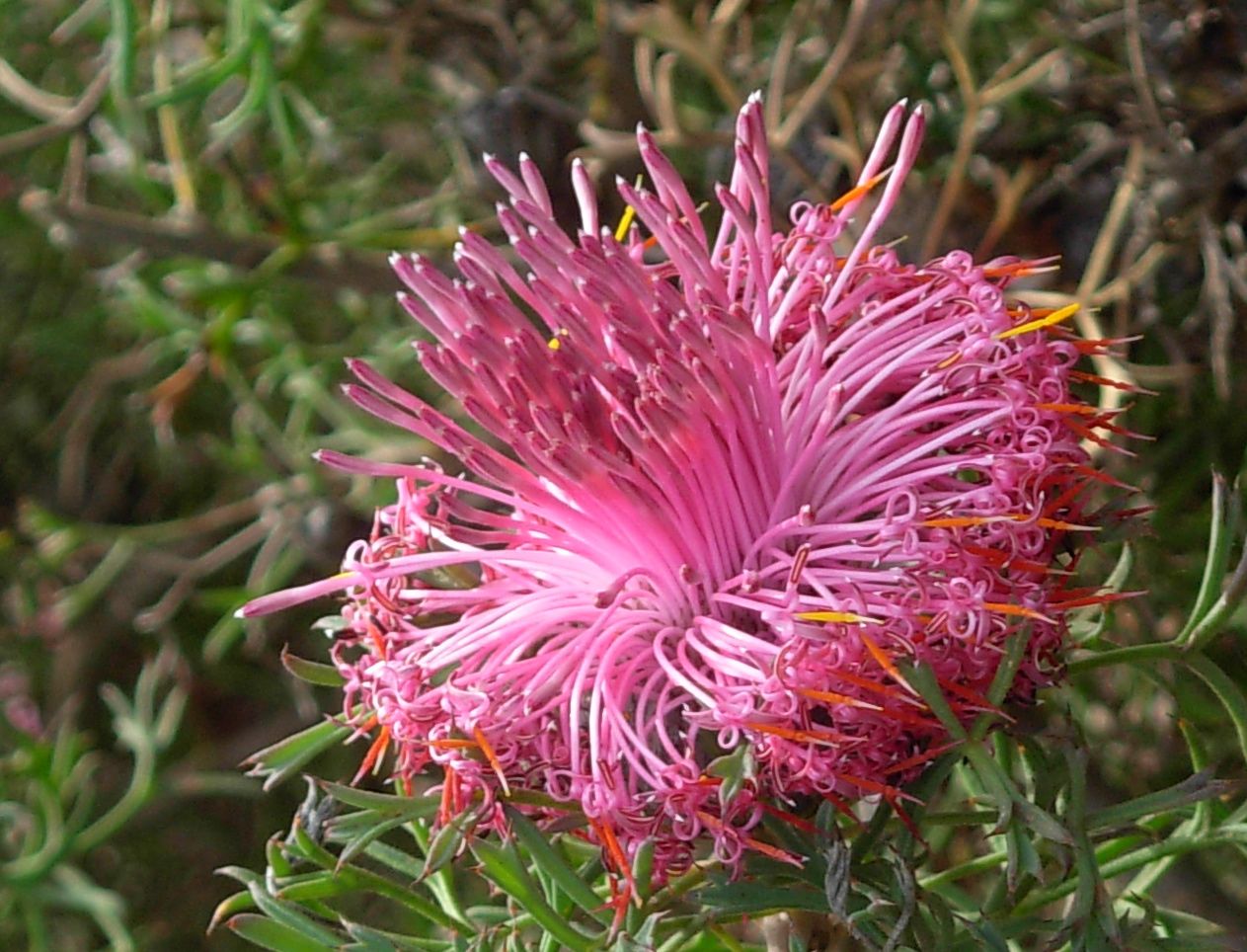
- Isopogon dubius in the Dryandra Woodland

Scientific classification
- Kingdom: Plantae
- Clade: Tracheophytes
- Clade: Angiosperms
- Clade: Eudicots
- Order: Proteales
- Family: Proteaceae
- Genus: Isopogon
- Species: I. dubius

Binomial name
- Isopogon dubius (R.Br.) Druce
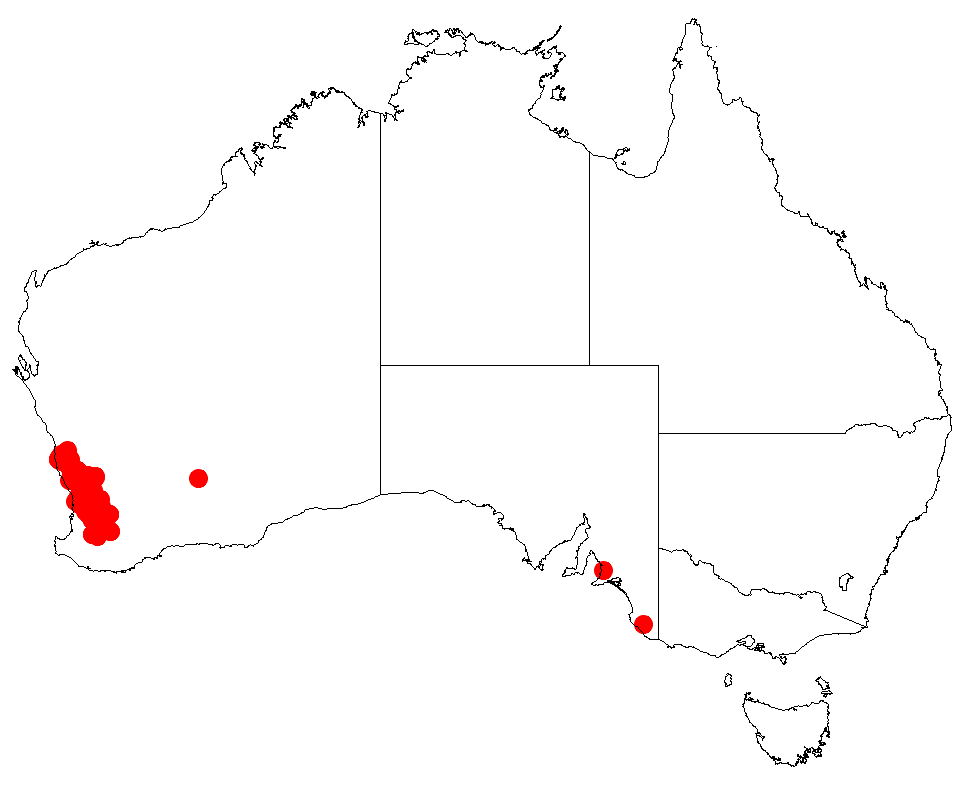
- Occurrence data from Australasian Virtual Herbarium

Synonyms
- Atylus roseus (Lindl.) Kuntze; Petrophila dubia R.Br. orth. var.; Petrophile dubia R.Br.; Isopogon scaber auct. non Lindl.: Meisner, C.D.F. in Lehmann, J.G.C. (ed.)

= Isopogon dubius =

Pincushion coneflower

Species of shrub endemic to Western Australia

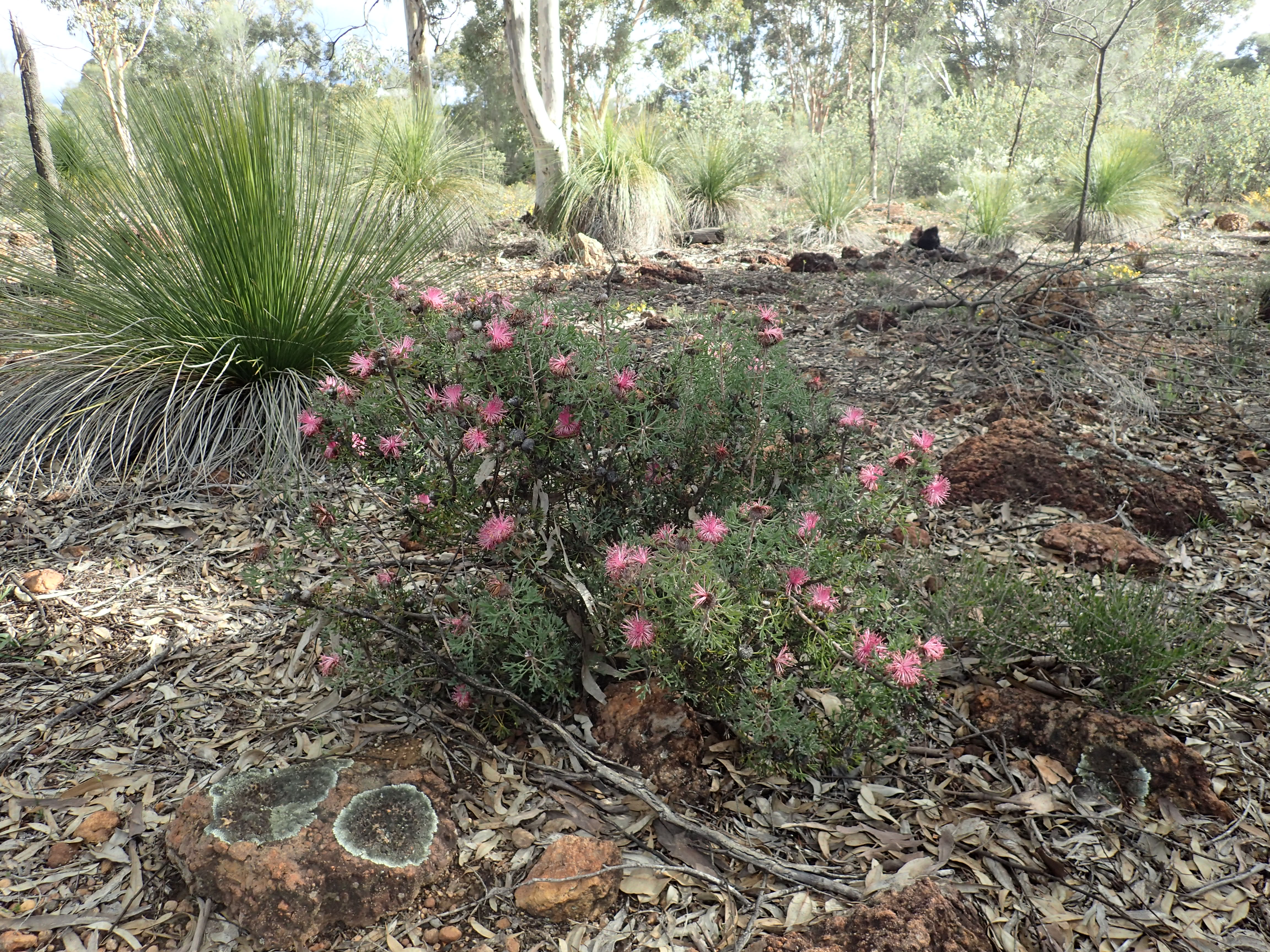
Habit in the Wallaby Hills Nature Reserve, near York

Isopogon dubius, commonly known as pincushion coneflower, is a species of plant in the family Proteaceae and is endemic to the south-west of Western Australia. It is a shrub with sharply-pointed, deeply lobed or pinnate leaves and more or less spherical heads of pink to reddish pink flowers.

== Description ==
Isopogon dubius is a shrub that typically grows to a height of 0.5–1.5 m (1 ft 8 in – 4 ft 11 in) and has hairy reddish brown branchlets, the young branchlets and young leaves hairy. The leaves are deeply 3-lobed or pinnate, 25–55 mm (0.98–2.17 in) long on a petiole about 20 mm (0.79 in) long, the tips of the lobes, or of the leaflets, sharply-pointed. The flowers are arranged in sessile, more or less spherical heads 40–50 mm (1.6–2.0 in) in diameter with many hairy, egg-shaped involucral bracts at the base. The flowers are 25–30 mm (0.98–1.18 in) long, pink to reddish pink and glabrous. Flowering occurs from July to September and the fruit is a hairy nut, fused with others in hemispherical head up to 30 mm (1.2 in) in diameter.

== Taxonomy ==
Pincushion coneflower was first formally described in 1830 by Robert Brown who gave it the name Petrophile dubia in the Supplementum to his Prodromus Florae Novae Hollandiae et Insulae Van Diemen from specimens collected in 1827 near the Swan River, by Charles Fraser. In 1917 George Claridge Druce changed the name to Isopogon dubius in The Botanical Exchange Club and Society of the British Isles Report for 1916.

== Distribution and habitat ==
Isopogon dubius grows in woodland and heath, mainly on the Darling Range from near Wongan Hills to Narrogin in the Avon Wheatbelt, Geraldton Sandplains, Jarrah Forest and Swan Coastal Plain in the south-west of Western Australia.

== Conservation status ==
This isopogon is classified as "not threatened" by the Government of Western Australia Department of Parks and Wildlife.

== Use in horticulture ==
Isopogon dubius was first cultivated in Europe in the 1800s. It prefers dry summers and excellent drainage and will tolerate moderate frosts. Full sun is required for the best flower display, although the plant can be grown in partial shade.
