= Pristimantis roseus =

Conservation status
- Least Concern (IUCN 3.1)

Scientific classification
- Kingdom: Animalia
- Phylum: Chordata
- Class: Amphibia
- Order: Anura
- Family: Strabomantidae
- Genus: Pristimantis
- Species: P. roseus

Binomial name
- Pristimantis roseus (Boulenger, 1918)

Synonyms
- Hylodes roseus Boulenger, 1918; Eleutherodactylus roseus (Boulenger, 1918)

Species of frog

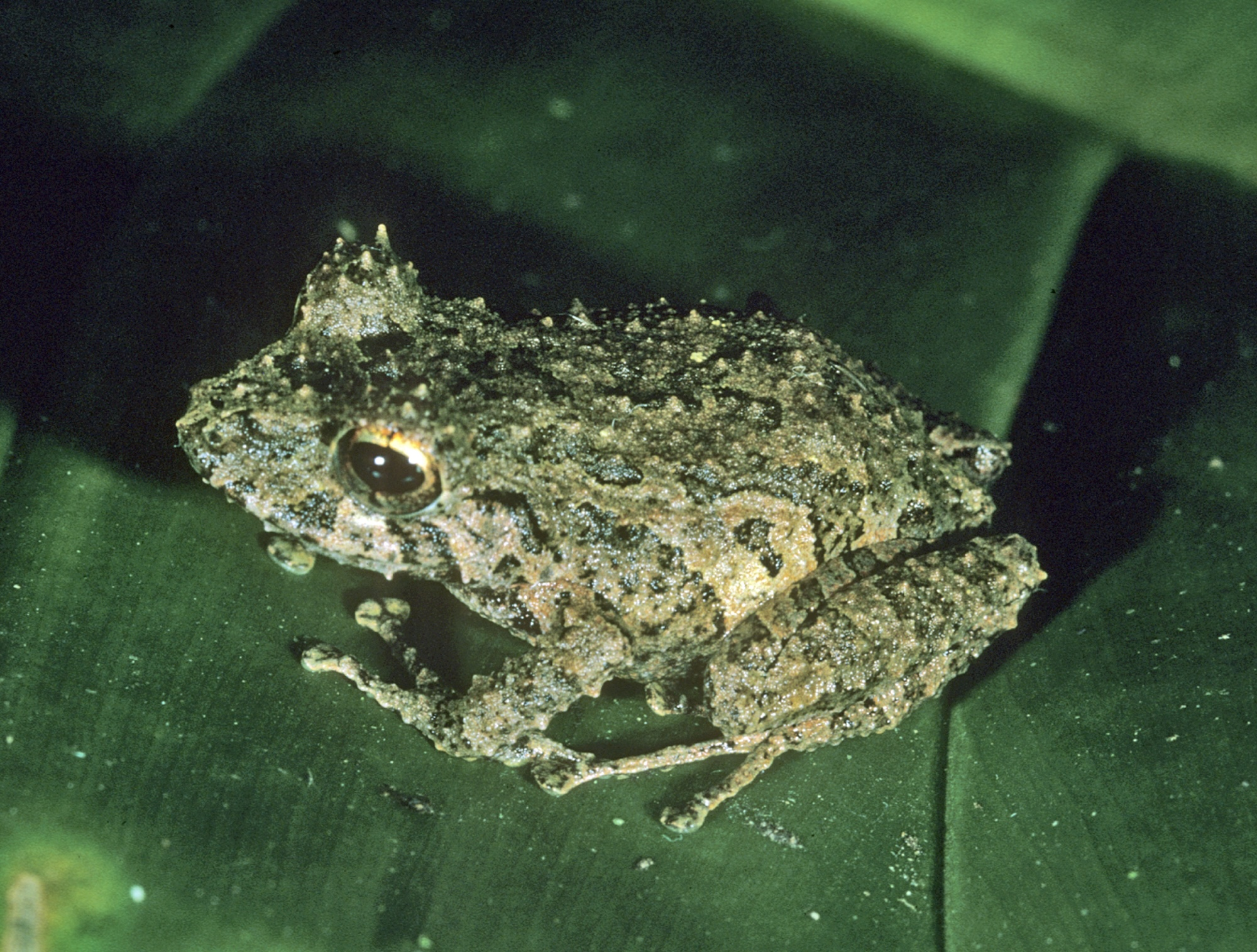
Pristimantis roseus

Pristimantis roseus is a species of frog in the family Strabomantidae. It is endemic to Colombia. Its natural habitat is tropical moist lowland forests. It is threatened by habitat loss.
