= Pyrodictiaceae =

Scientific classification
- Domain: Archaea
- Kingdom: Thermoproteati
- Phylum: Thermoproteota
- Class: Thermoprotei
- Order: Desulfurococcales
- Family: Pyrodictiaceae; Burggraf, Huber & Stetter 1997

Genera
- "Geogemma"; Hyperthermus; Pyrodictium; "Ca. Pyroantarcticum"; Pyrofollis; Pyrolobus

Family of archaea

The Pyrodictiaceae are a family of disc-shaped anaerobic microorganisms belonging to the order Desulfurococcales, in the domain Archaea. Members of this family are distinguished from the other family (Desulfurococcaceae) in the order Desulfurococcales by having an optimal growth temperature above 100 °C, rather than below 100 °C.

== Phylogeny ==
The currently accepted taxonomy is based on the List of Prokaryotic names with Standing in Nomenclature (LPSN) and National Center for Biotechnology Information (NCBI).

16S rRNA based LTP_07_2026

- Pyrodictiaceae
  - Pyrolobus Blöchl et al. 1999
  - - Pyrodictium abyssi Pley and Stetter 1991
    - - - Hyperthermus Zillig et al. 1991
        - Pyrodictium delaneyi Lin et al. 2016
      - - Pyrofollis Miyazaki et al. 2024
        - - Pyrodictium
            - P. brockii Stetter et al. 1984
            - P. occultum Stetter et al. 1984

53 marker proteins based GTDB 11-RS232

- Pyrodictiaceae
  - Pyrolobus
  - - Hyperthermus
    - - Pyrofollis
      - - Pyrodictium
          - P. occultum
          - - P. abyssi
            - P. delaneyi

== See also ==
- List of Archaea genera
