= Coccoid =

Coccoid means shaped like or resembling a coccus, that is, spherical.
The noun coccoid or coccoids may refer to:

- a level of organization, characterized by unicellular, non-flagellated, non-amoeboid organisms, with a definite shape, in general but not always ovoid. It is found in many groups, e.g.:
  - some bacteria, also called cocci (pl. of coccus)
  - some green algae, like the desmids and the former Chlorococcales (now in several orders within the division Chlorophyta)
  - some dinoflagellates, notably Symbiodinium
  - some chrysophytes
  - some xanthophytes
  - the diatoms
- the superfamily Coccoidea of scale insects
  - the Coccidae family within the Coccoidea

== See also ==
- Coccolite, a form of the mineral diopside
- Coccolithophore, a class of phytoplankton (alga)
- Coccolith, a platelet formed by coccolithophore, found in chalk
