= Kiloniellaceae =

Scientific classification
- Domain: Bacteria
- Kingdom: Pseudomonadati
- Phylum: Pseudomonadota
- Class: Alphaproteobacteria
- Order: Rhodospirillales
- Family: Kiloniellaceae; Wiese et al. 2009

Genera
- Aestuariispira Park et al. 2014; Kiloniella Wiese et al. 2009; Marivibrio Chen et al. 2017; Thalassocola Lin et al. 2015

Family of bacteria

The Kiloniellaceae are a family of bacteria from the order Rhodospirillales.
