= Rosea =

Rosea may refer to:

- a Latin adjective meaning rose, rosy or pink
- a synonym for Rhosus, a Roman Catholic titular see
- a hamlet of the municipality of Brunello, Italy
- a character in the Valkyrie Profile: Covenant of the Plume videogame

== Scientific names ==
- Rosea Klotzsch, a former genus of the plant family Rubiaceae and now synonymized with the genus Tricalysia
- Rosea Mart., a taxonomic synonym of the plant genus Iresine
- Rosea Fabr., a taxonomic synonym of the plant genus Rhodiola

== See also ==
- Roseus (disambiguation)
