= Acetobacteraceae =

Scientific classification
- Domain: Bacteria
- Kingdom: Pseudomonadati
- Phylum: Pseudomonadota
- Class: Alphaproteobacteria
- Order: Rhodospirillales
- Family: Acetobacteraceae (ex Henrici 1939) Gillis and De Ley 1980

Genera
- See text.

Synonyms
- Elioraeaceae Habib et al. 2020

Family of bacteria

Acetobacteraceae is a family of Gram-negative bacteria, belonging to the order Rhodospirillales, class Alphaproteobacteria. Two distinct clades are recognized: the acetic acid bacteria and a more heterogeneous group including acidophilic and phototrophic bacteria. The type genus is Acetobacter. Ten genera from Acetobacteraceae make up the acetic acid bacteria.

== History ==
Acetobacteraceae was originally proposed as a family for Acetobacter and Gluconobacter based on rRNA and DNA–DNA hybridization comparisons in 1980.

== Genera ==
=== Accepted genera ===
The following genera have been effectively and validly published:

- Acetobacter Beijerinck 1898 (Approved Lists 1980)
- Acidibrevibacterium Muhadesi et al. 2019
- Acidicaldus Johnson et al. 2006
- Acidiphilium Harrison 1981
- Acidisoma Belova et al. 2009
- Acidisphaera Hiraishi et al. 2000
- Acidocella Kishimoto et al. 1996
- Acidomonas Urakami et al. 1989
- Ameyamaea Yukphan et al. 2010
- Asaia Yamada et al. 2000
- Belnapia Reddy et al. 2006
- Bombella Li et al. 2015
- Caldovatus Habib et al. 2017
- Commensalibacter Roh et al. 2019
- Craurococcus Saitoh et al. 1998
- Crenalkalicoccus Ming et al. 2016
- Dankookia Kim et al. 2016
- Elioraea Albuquerque et al. 2008
- Endobacter Ramírez-Bahena et al. 2013
- Entomobacter Guzman et al. 2021
- Gluconacetobacter corrig. Yamada et al. 1998
- Gluconobacter Asai 1935 (Approved Lists 1980)
- Granulibacter Greenberg et al. 2006
- Humitalea Margesin and Zhang 2013
- Komagataeibacter Yamada et al. 2013
- Kozakia Lisdiyanti et al. 2002
- Lichenicoccus Pankratov et al. 2020
- Lichenicola Noh et al. 2020
- Muricoccus Kämpfer et al. 2003
- Neoasaia Yukphan et al. 2006
- Neokomagataea Yukphan et al. 2011
- Nguyenibacter Vu et al. 2013
- Oecophyllibacter Chua et al. 2021
- Paracraurococcus Saitoh et al. 1998
- Plastoroseomonas Rai et al. 2022
- Rhodopila Imhoff et al. 1984
- Rhodovarius Kämpfer et al. 2004
- Rhodovastum Okamura et al. 2018
- Roseicella Khan et al. 2019
- Roseococcus Yurkov et al. 1994
- Roseomonas Rihs et al. 1998
- Rubritepida Alarico et al. 2002
- Saccharibacter Jojima et al. 2004
- Siccirubricoccus Yang et al. 2017
- Swaminathania Loganathan and Nair 2004
- Swingsia Malimas et al. 2014
- Tanticharoenia Yukphan et al. 2008
- Teichococcus Kämpfer et al. 2003

=== Provisional genera ===
The following genera have been published, but not validated according to the Bacteriological Code:

- "Acetomonas" Leifson 1954
- "Granulobacter" Beijerinck and van Delden 1904
- "Komagatabacter" Yamada et al. 2012
- "Parasaccharibacter" Corby-Harris et al. 2014
- "Sediminicoccus" Qu et al. 2013
