= Rhodospirillales =

Purple sulfur bacteria

Scientific classification
- Domain: Bacteria
- Kingdom: Pseudomonadati
- Phylum: Pseudomonadota
- Class: Alphaproteobacteria
- Order: Rhodospirillales; Pfennig and Trüper 1971 (Approved Lists 1980)

Families
- Acetobacteraceae (ex Henrici 1939) Gillis and De Ley 1980; Azospirillaceae Hördt et al. 2020; Geminicoccaceae Proença et al. 2018; Kiloniellaceae Wiese et al. 2009; Reyranellaceae Hördt et al. 2020; Rhodospirillaceae Pfennig and Trüper 1971 (Approved Lists 1980); Rhodovibrionaceae Hördt et al. 2020; Stellaceae Hördt et al. 2020; Terasakiellaceae Hördt et al. 2020; Thalassobaculaceae Hördt et al. 2020; Thalassospiraceae Hördt et al. 2020; Zavarziniaceae Hördt et al. 2020

Synonyms
- Kiloniellales Wiese et al. 2009

Order of bacteria

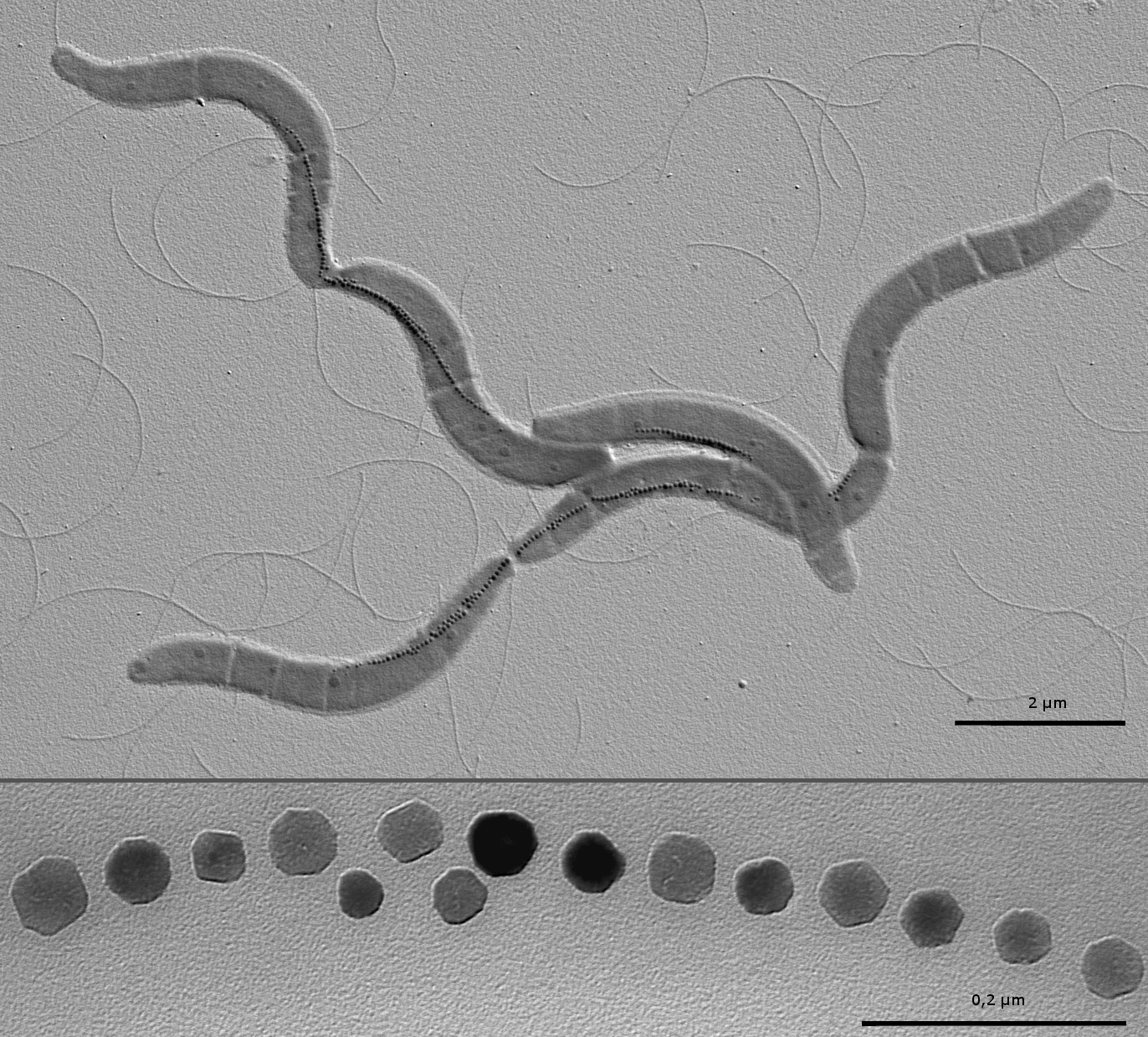

The Rhodospirillales are an order of Pseudomonadota.

== Notable Families ==
The Acetobacteraceae comprise the acetic acid bacteria, which are heterotrophic and produce acetic acid during their respiration.

The Rhodospirillaceae include mainly purple nonsulfur bacteria, which produce energy through photosynthesis.

== Phylogeny ==
The currently accepted taxonomy is based on the List of Prokaryotic names with Standing in Nomenclature (LPSN). The phylogeny is based on whole-genome analysis. (Note: The Geminicoccaceae are not included in this phylogenetic tree.)

- - Rhodospirillaceae
    - Zavarziniaceae
    - - Azospirillaceae
      - - - - Stellaceae
            - Reyranellaceae
          - Acetobacteraceae
        - - Rhodospirillaceae
          - - - Thalassospiraceae
              - Terasakiellaceae
            - - Kiloniellaceae
              - - Rhodovibrionaceae
                - Thalassobaculaceae
  - outgroup
    Rhodothalassiales
