= Posca =

Ancient Roman drink

Posca (/ˈpɒskə/) was an ancient Roman drink made by mixing water and wine vinegar. Bracing but less nutritious and generally less palatable than wine, it was typically a drink for soldiers, the lower classes, and slaves.

== Etymology and later elaborations ==
The word posca is derived from either Latin potor 'to drink' or from Greek epoxos 'very sharp'. Because the Greeks lacked a word for posca, sources written in Greek, such as the Bible and Plutarch, use the word οξος, oxos 'vinegar' in its place (translated as acetum in the Vulgate Bible). The word eventually migrated into Greek from about the sixth century AD onward as the Byzantine army continued the Roman tradition, drinking what they termed phouska. This word (sometimes rendered phouska) may mean 'beer' in some contexts:

What it certainly meant originally, like Latin posca, was vinegar-and-water, the regular beverage of the classical Roman army on bad days. Thus Aëtius gives, and Paul of Aegina repeats, a recipe for a "palatable and laxative phouska" which includes cumin, fennel seed, pennyroyal, celery seed, anise, thyme, scammony, and salt to be added to the basic liquid, which is explicitly called oxykraton "vinegar diluted with water."

== Usage ==
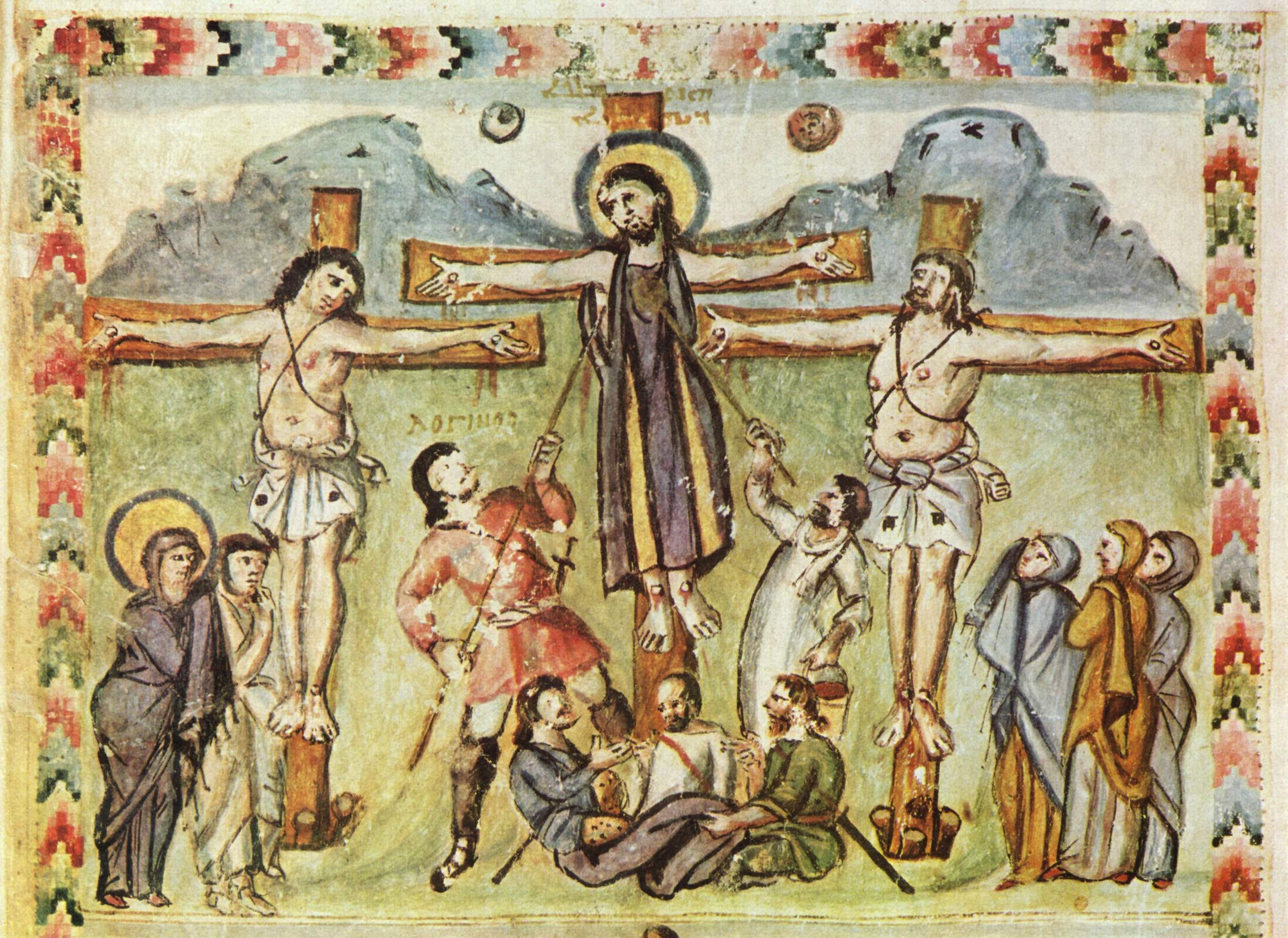
A Roman soldier (conventionally called "Stephaton") feeds Jesus with posca, from the Rabbula Gospels, AD 586.

The widespread use of posca is attested by numerous mentions by ancient sources ranging from the Natural History of Pliny the Elder to the comedies of Plautus. When on campaign, generals and emperors could show their solidarity with common soldiers by drinking posca, as did Cato the Elder (as recorded by Plutarch) and the emperor Hadrian, who according to the Historia Augusta "actually led a soldier's life ... and, after the example of Scipio Aemilianus, Metellus and his own adoptive father Trajan cheerfully ate out of doors such camp-fare as bacon, cheese, and vinegar." A decree of AD 360 ordered that lower ranks of the army should drink posca and wine on alternate days.

The most famous mention of posca is in the Bible, where Jesus is given a sponge soaked in oxos (conventionally translated as "vinegar") during his crucifixion; the Gospel of John mentions that it was given to him "on hyssop." Posca was also used as an ingredient in ancient recipes, most famously mentioned in Apicius.

Vinegar drinks with herbs were also used as medicine. Recipes can be found in medical scriptures like the P. Oxy. 1384.

== See also ==
- Acidulated water – Water with acid added
- Holy Sponge – Instrument of the Passion of Jesus Christ
- Kombucha – Fermented tea beverage
- Oxymel – Mixture of honey and vinegar, used as a medicine
- Sekanjabin – Iranian beverage
- Shrub (drink) – Fruit liqueur or vinegared syrup cordial
- Switchel – Drink containing vinegar and ginger
