= Black vinegar =

Dark-colored vinegar in Chinese cuisine

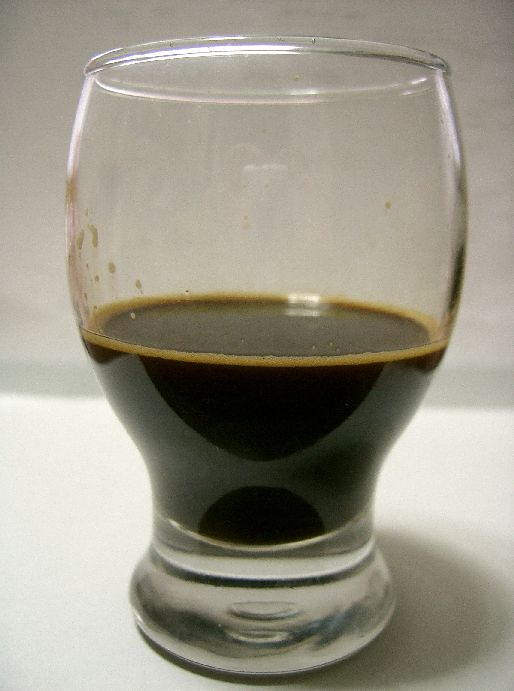
Black vinegar in a glass

Black vinegar is dark-colored vinegar traditionally used in Chinese and other East Asian cuisine.

== Types ==
=== China ===
One of the most important types of Chinese "black vinegar" is the Shanxi mature vinegar (simplified Chinese: 山西老陈醋; traditional Chinese: 山西老陳醋; pinyin: lǎo chéncù) from the central plains of Northern China, particularly in the Shanxi province (Shanxi mature vinegar). It is made from sorghum, peas, barley, bran and chaff and has a much stronger smoky flavor than rice-based black vinegar. It is popular in the north of China as a dipping sauce, particularly for dumplings. It is protected by People's Republic of China protected geographical indication (PRC PGI).

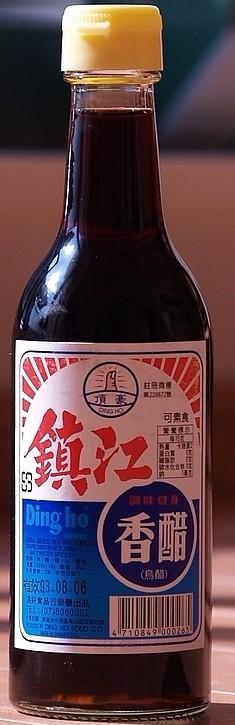
A bottle of Zhenjiang vinegar.

Another important type of Chinese "black vinegar" is Zhenjiang vinegar (simplified Chinese: 镇江香醋; traditional Chinese: 鎭江香醋; pinyin: zhènjiāng xiāngcù) and similar condiments from southern China. The condiment is an inky-black rice vinegar aged for a malty, woody, and smoky flavor. It is made from rice (usually glutinous), or sorghum, or in some combination of those, sometimes including wheat and millet. Black vinegar was traditionally aged in clay pots. Zhenjiang vinegar is also protected by PRC PGI.

In Sichuan, black vinegar is made from wheat bran and flavored with traditional medicinal spices. Sichuan's Baoning vinegar (保寧醋 or 保宁醋) is a famous example.

Yongchun vinegar from Fujian is made using glutinous rice and red yeast rice.

A number of historic vinegars were considered to be among China's first list of intangible cultural heritage, with more added since. The Chinese government protects a number of vinegar types as Geographical Indication products with attached national standards.

=== Japan ===
The Japanese kurozu, a somewhat lighter form of black vinegar, is made only from brown rice.

According to some reports, Japan's annual per capita consumption of vinegar is 3.5 times that of China's.

=== Korea ===
In Korea black vinegar is also made with brown rice.

=== Taiwan ===
Taiwanese black vinegar is the most different, with more in common with worcestershire sauce than other black vinegars. Its base is sticky rice which is then aged with other ingredients. Other ingredients can include fruit, vegetables, spices, and sugar. Taiwanese black vinegar is known as wūcù and lends its name to dishes like wūcù miàn (black vinegar noodles). Taiwanese black vinegar is very high in sodium.

== History ==
Ancient Chinese laborers used wine as a leavening agent to ferment and brew vinegar. East Asian vinegar originated in China, and there are at least three thousand years of documented history of making vinegar. In ancient China, "vinegar" was called "bitter wine," which also indicates that "vinegar" originated from "wine".

The first written mention of vinegar dates back to BC 1058, during the Zhou dynasty.

Initially extremely costly and used only by the elite, vinegar eventually spread into popular usage by the Han dynasty.

Between 369–404 AD, Chinese techniques for making rice vinegar were imported into Japan.

By 500 AD in the Northern and Southern dynasty era, one book featured 23 different methods for vinegar-making.

During the Ming and Qing dynasties, the process for creating "smoked vinegar" was developed.

Though the scale of the vinegar industry in China has greatly expanded since the country's industrialisation, production methods remain largely traditional due to a difficulty in regulating and controlling heat-sensitive microbial growths needed for the vinegar-making process.

Some manufacturers have replaced the pottery vats and concrete pools with stainless steel tanks, as well as diversified their vinegar offerings to include different raw materials, including jujube, cherry, aloe, buckwheat, sea buckthorn fruit, fig, onion, and bamboo.

In Chinese medicine, vinegar is considered as a curative effect for acute and chronic hepatitis.

== Uses ==
Black vinegar has been used as a full-flavored but less expensive alternative to traditional balsamic vinegar.

== See also ==
- Chinese rice vinegars
