= Shrub (drink) =

Fruit liqueur or vinegared syrup cordial

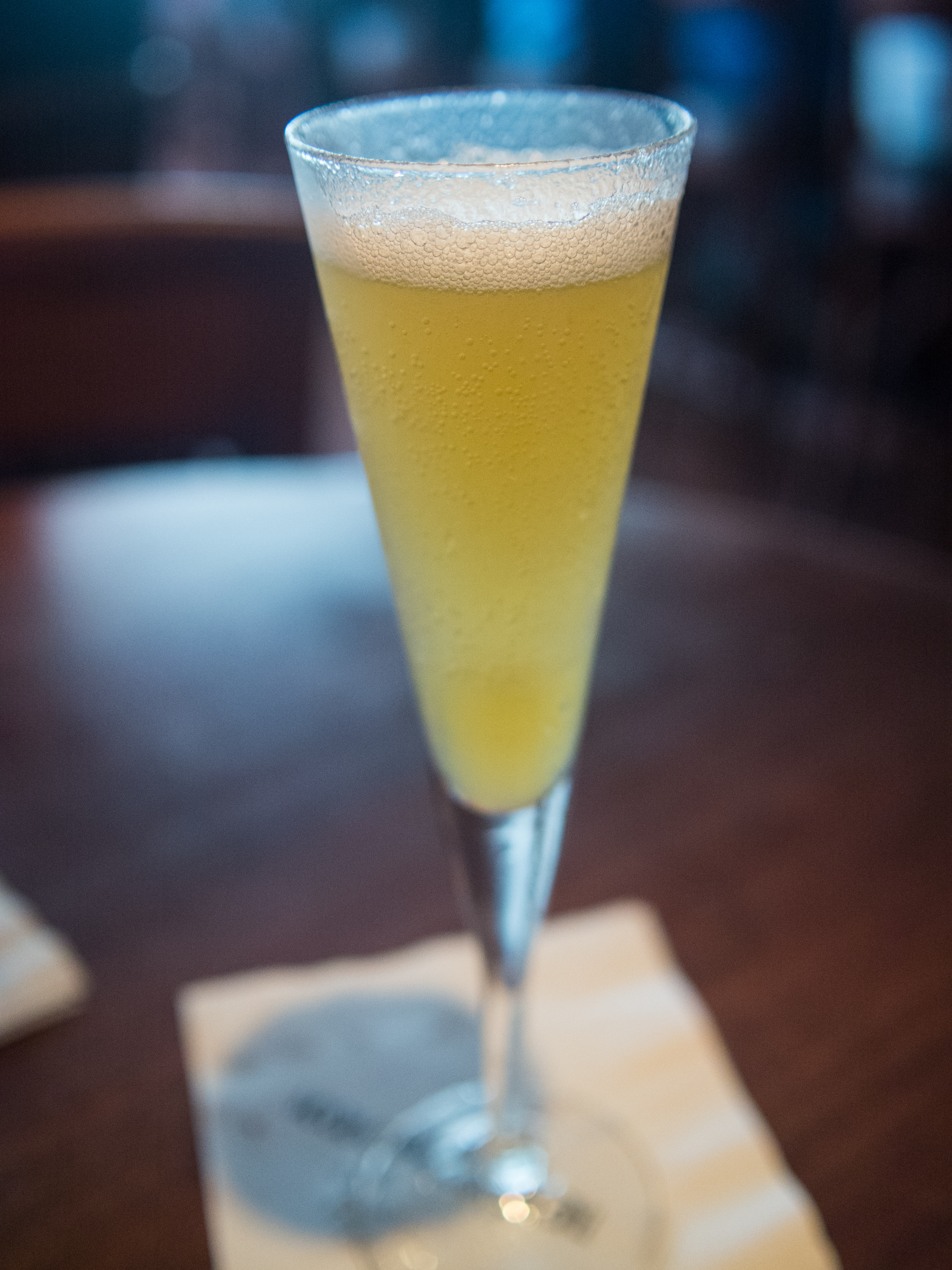
A peach shrub

In mixed drinks, shrub is the name of two related acidulated beverages. One is a fruit liqueur that was popular in 17th- and 18th-century England, typically made with rum or brandy and mixed with sugar and the juice or rinds of citrus fruit. The other is a cocktail or soft drink that was popular during America's colonial era, made by mixing a vinegared syrup with spirits, water, or carbonated water. The term can also be applied to the base, a sweetened vinegar-based syrup from which the cocktail is made; that syrup is also known as drinking vinegar. Drinking vinegar is often infused with fruit juice, herbs and spices, for use in mixed drinks.

== Etymology ==
The term "shrub" is borrowed from the Arabic word sharāb meaning "to drink".

== History ==
The early English version of the shrub arose from the medicinal cordials of the 15th century. The drink gained popularity among smugglers in the 1680s trying to avoid paying import taxes for goods shipped from mainland Europe: To avoid detection, smugglers would sometimes sink barrels of spirits off-shore to be retrieved later; the addition of fruit flavours aided in masking the taste of alcohol fouled by sea water. An early Rum Shrub recipe from The English and Australian Cookery Book called for almonds, cloves, cassia, and the peel of oranges, "infused in the best rum," with the addition of a thread of ambergris and vanilla. "Good shrub is very delicious, and were it fashionable it would obtain rank as a liqueur."

A notable example of drinking vinegar was raspberry vinegar, made from raspberry juice, vinegar and sugar. Raspberry vinegar has been recorded as a beverage used for hundreds of years, dating back to the middle of the seventeenth century and prior - with texts written by the scholar Franciscus Junius referencing the drink in the late 1600s. The sweetened raspberry syrup is said to have entered the beverage world through pharmacists and chemists, primarily through its use within the apothecary. The mixture has been recorded as a tincture for use in natural remedies treating coughs, colds, and asthma, though in modern culture, raspberry vinegar is mostly used as a condiment, or a pleasant drink. By the mid-1800s, this same fruit vinegar blended with a spirit such as brandy or rum was being referred to as raspberry shrub.

As a mixture of fruit and alcohol, shrub is related to punch; however, punches were normally served immediately after mixing the ingredients, whereas shrubs tended to have a higher concentration of flavour and sugar and could be stored for later use, much like a pre-made drink mixer. The shrub was itself a common ingredient in punches, either on its own or as a simple mix with brandy or rum. It was also served during the Christmas season mixed with raisins, honey, lemon, sherry, rum and other spirits. The shrub was sold in most public houses throughout England in the 17th and 18th centuries, although the drink fell out of fashion by the late 1800s.

A proprietary cordial known as Shrub was developed by J. R. Phillips of Bristol. "Rum and Shrub" was a popular drink in Bristol and the west of England in the 20th century long after the convention had died out elsewhere. It is still sold today.

The American version of the shrub has its origins in 17th century England where vinegar was used as an alternative to citrus juices in the preservation of berries and other fruits for the off-season. Fruit preserves made in this fashion were themselves known as shrubs and the practice carried over to colonial America. By the 19th century, typical American recipes for shrubs used vinegar poured over fruit—traditionally berries—which was left to infuse anywhere from overnight up to several days; afterwards, the fruit would be strained out and the remaining liquid would be mixed with a sweetener such as sugar or honey and then reduced to make a syrup. The sweet-and-sour syrup could be mixed with either water or soda water and served as a soft drink, or it could be used as a mixer in alcoholic cocktails. Shrubs eventually fell out of popularity with the advent of home refrigeration.

== 21st century usage ==
The serving of vinegar-based shrub drinks became popular again in 2011 in American restaurants and bars. The trend has also been noted in bars in Canada as well as London. The acidity of the shrub makes it well suited as an apéritif or used as an alternative to bitters in cocktails. Unlike cocktails acidulated with citrus, vinegar-based drinks will remain clear when shaken. The rising popularity of kombucha and similar fermented drinks in the late 2010s and early 2020s helped spread the popularity of shrubs further, with many cafes, bars and restaurants making their own out of seasonal fruit, and offering it as a low-sugar alternative to sodas.

== See also ==
- Gastrique – Caramelized sugar, deglazed with vinegar
- Oxymel – Mixture of honey and vinegar, used as a medicine
- Posca – Ancient Roman drink
- Squash (drink) – Non-alcoholic concentrated syrup
- Switchel – Drink containing vinegar and ginger
- Sekanjabin – Iranian beverage
