= Honeygar =

Mix of honey and apple cider vinegar

Alternative medicine
- Claims: Wide ranging benefits on health
- See also: Switchel

Honeygar, also Honegar, is a mix of honey and apple cider vinegar, similar to switchel. Honey and vinegar mixtures such as oxymel have been used for purported health benefits since ancient times.

== Origins ==
The name "Honegar" was used by D. C. Jarvis in his book Folk Medicine: A Vermont Doctor's Guide to Good Health (1958). Following the success of Jarvis's book in the US, honegar also enjoyed some popularity in Japan. Many in natural health circles claim that honeygar has wide ranging benefits on health. One particularly repeated claim is its benefits for the symptoms of arthritis, although there is no clinical evidence to support this.

== Criticism ==
In 1960, copies of Jarvis' book Folk Medicine were seized by the Food and Drug Administration (FDA) in connection with sales of honegar. Physician Louis Lasagna noted that:

In Albany, New York, FDA agents seized $60,000 worth of "Honegar," a mixture of honey and apple cider vinegar, because its labeling failed to bear adequate directions for treating nearly fifty diseases and conditions for which "Honegar" was intended to be used. Seized with the mixture were reprints and quotations from Jarvis' book. (Jarvis was apparently uninvolved in the commercial manufacture of the product.)
