= Wafu =

Wafu or WAFU may refer to:

- West African Football Union
  - WAFU Nations Cup
- Wafu dressing, a Japanese-style salad dressing
- WAFU, a term for members of the Fleet Air Arm
