= Switchel =

Drink containing vinegar and ginger

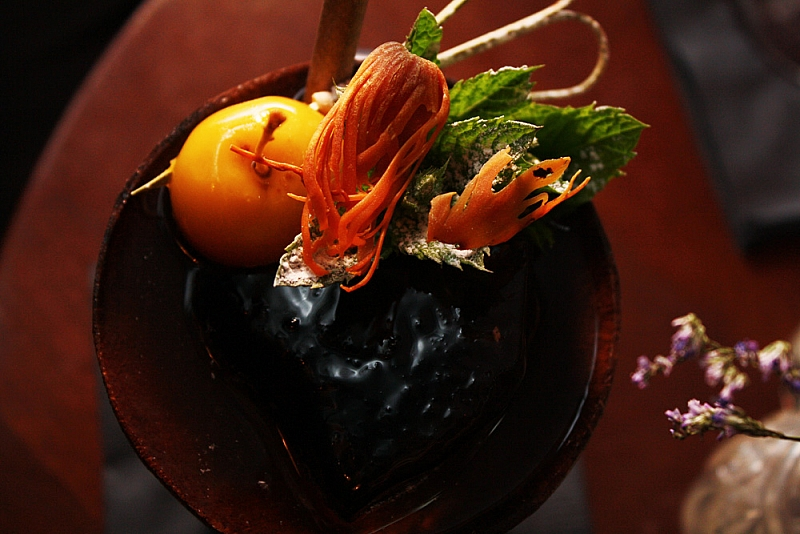
- A close-up of a switchel-based cocktail, featuring various garnishes.
- Origin: British America, New England or the Caribbean
- Introduced: 17th century

Switchel, switzel, swizzle, switchy, ginger-water, or haymaker's punch is a drink made from water mixed with vinegar and often seasoned with ginger. It is typically sweetened with molasses, although honey, sugar, brown sugar, or maple syrup may also be used. In the U.S. state of Vermont, oatmeal and lemon juice were sometimes added to the beverage.

The etymology of switchel is uncertain, but it may be related to "sweet".

== Origins ==
Switchel is believed to have originated in the Caribbean, although New England also claims credit for its creation. It became a popular summer drink in the American Colonies in the late 17th century. By the 19th century, it was a traditional drink served to thirsty farmers during hay harvests, earning it the nickname "haymaker’s punch." Herman Melville wrote in I and My Chimney, "I will give a traveler a cup of switchel, if he wants it; but am I bound to supply him with a sweet taste?" In The Long Winter, Laura Ingalls Wilder describes a switchel-like beverage her mother sent for her and her father to drink while haying: "Ma had sent them ginger-water. She had sweetened the cool well-water with sugar, flavored it with vinegar, and put in plenty of ginger to warm their stomachs so they could drink until they were not thirsty. Ginger-water would not make them sick, as plain cold water would when they were so hot."

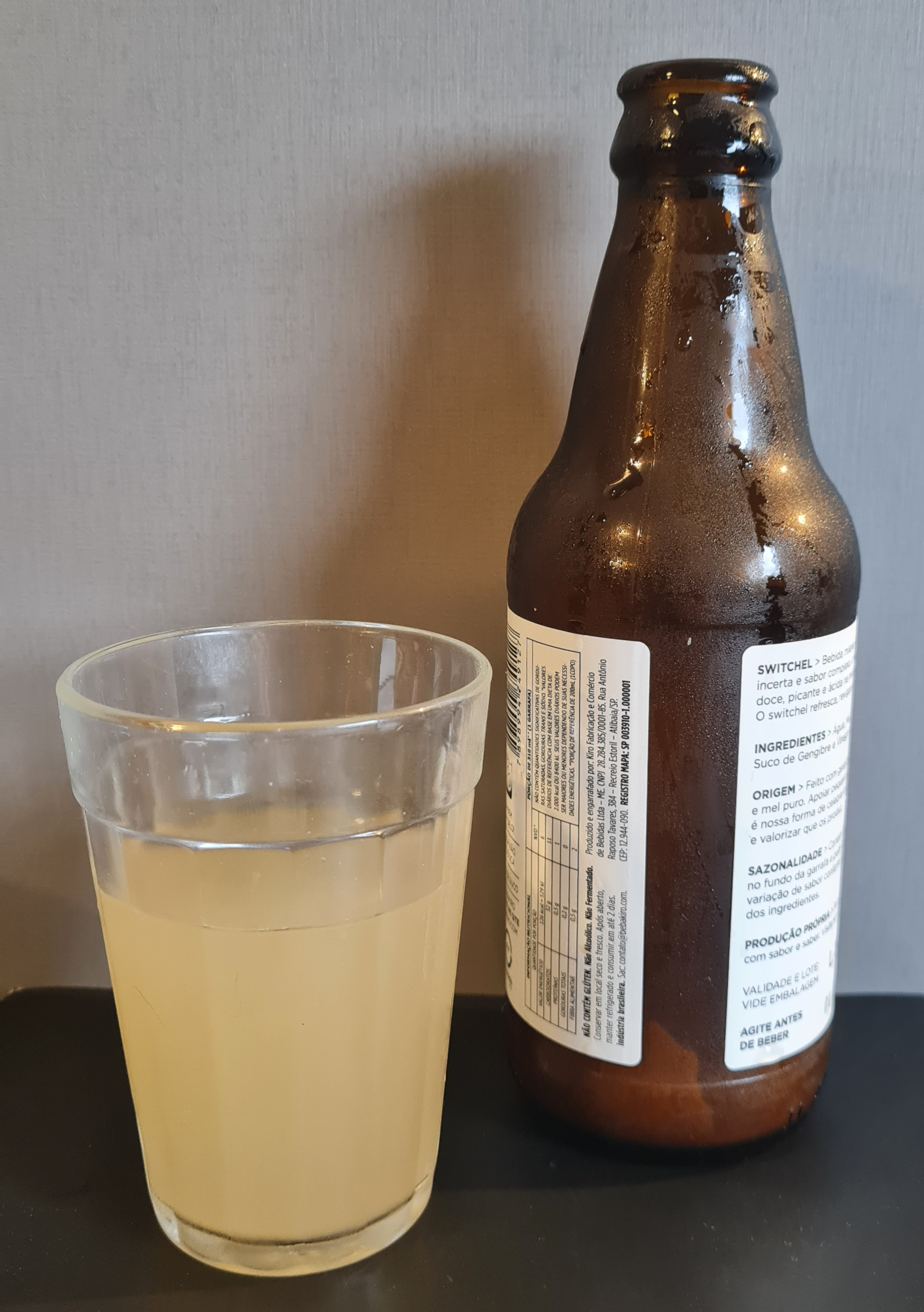
Bottle and glass of a Brazilian switchel brand

== Modern recommendations ==
In his 1958 book Folk Medicine: A Vermont Doctor's Guide to Good Health, the Vermont physician D. C. Jarvis recommended a similar drink, a mixture of honey and cider vinegar, which he called "honegar."

== Contemporary popularity ==
Switchel is experiencing renewed interest and has become a steadily growing category in the ready-to-drink beverage industry. As of 2015, several companies produce and distribute switchel beverages throughout the U.S., and Canada has two commercial switchel producers.

== Usage with alcohol ==
Switchel was sometimes mixed with rum, especially at sea, and it was served in the U.S. House of Representatives, where it was "flavored with the finest Jamaica rum."

== See also ==
- Ginger ale
- Posca
- Oxymel
- Shrub (drink)
- Sekanjabin
