= Non-brewed condiment =

Malt vinegar substitute

Non-brewed condiment is a malt vinegar substitute created with water, acetic acid, flavourings and often caramel colour, generally used in fish and chip shops in the United Kingdom and Ireland.

Non-brewed condiment is much quicker and cheaper to manufacture than vinegar. According to Trading Standards in the UK, it cannot be labelled as vinegar or even put in traditional vinegar bottles if it is being sold or put out on counters in fish-and-chip shops.

== History ==
According to Arthur Slater, writing in the August 1970 edition of Industrial Archaeology, the Chief Metropolitan Magistrate ruled in a 1949 prosecution at Bow Street Magistrates' Court that the term non-brewed vinegar, which up until then had been used to market such acetic-acid solutions, was in contravention of the Merchandise Marks Act 1926 as it constituted a false trade description. The decision was upheld on appeal to the King's Bench Division. Slater goes on to state that after the unsuccessful appeal the trade association concerned announced that in future their product would be sold as non-brewed condiment.

== See also ==
- List of condiments
