= Ginger dressing =

Cuisine

- Salad with ginger dressing
- Alternative names: Sesame ginger dressing, sesame dressing
- Type: Salad dressing or dip
- Main ingredients: Seasoned rice vinegar, garlic, onion, ginger, vegetable oil, scallions, sesame seeds, soy sauce, peppers, honey or corn syrup, and water

Ginger dressing (also called sesame ginger dressing or sesame dressing) is a Japanese-American salad dressing made with seasoned rice vinegar, minced garlic, minced onion, ginger, vegetable oil, scallions, sesame seeds, soy sauce, peppers, honey or corn syrup, and water. Its origin is commonly attributed to the New York-based Benihana chain of restaurants during the 1960s.

Often served on salads at Japanese-American and Chinese-American restaurants, sesame ginger dressing is spicy and sweet.

Ingredients for a typical ginger dressing include: water, vegetable oil, sugar, soy sauce, garlic, onion, ginger, vinegar, and brown sugar.

== See also ==
- Wafu dressing
- Asian cuisine
