= D. C. Jarvis =

American physician

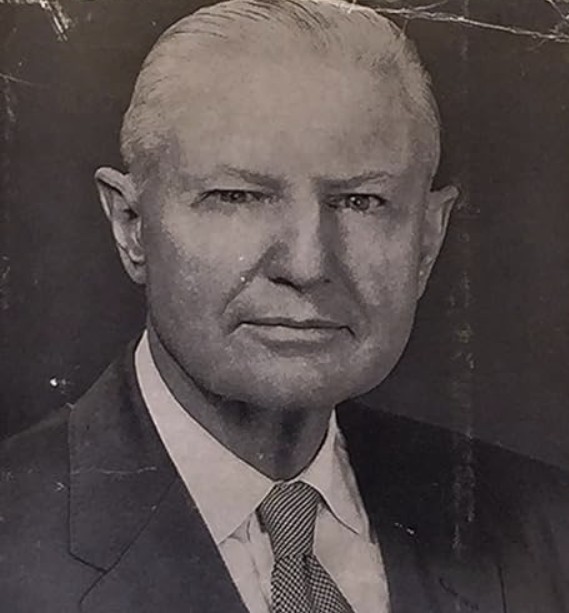
- Born: April 15, 1879; Plattsburgh, New York
- Died: August 18, 1966 (aged 87); South Barre, Vermont
- Occupations: Physician, writer

DeForest Clinton Jarvis (March 15, 1881 – August 18, 1966) was an American physician from Vermont. He is best known for drinking vinegar folk medicine. He recommended a mixture of raw apple cider vinegar and honey that has variously been called switchel or honegar, as a health tonic. He promoted the use of vinegar to keep the acidity of the body more acidic than alkaline, which he believed treated medical problems like burns and varicose veins.

== Biography ==
Jarvis was born in Plattsburgh, New York State, into a fifth-generation Vermont family and grew up in Burlington, Vermont. His parents were George Jarvis and Abbie Vincent. He graduated from the University of Vermont Medical College in 1904, and began practicing medicine in Barre, Vermont, in 1909.

Jarvis married Pearl Macomber, and they had a daughter, Sylvia Jarvis Smith (b. June 29, 1914, d. December 27, 2009), She graduated from the University of Vermont in 1936. Jarvis's hobbies included making jewelry and playing the cello, and he managed a children's orchestra for 22 years.

Jarvis's 1958 book Folk Medicine: A Vermont Doctor's Guide to Good Health was on The New York Times Best Seller list for two years, ultimately selling over one million copies, more than 245,000 copies in a single year, and was still in print as of 2002. One reviewer wrote, "Pliny, the ancient Roman originator of the doctrine of signatures, used honey and vinegar to cleanse the system and promote good health. D. C. Jarvis, M.D. in Folk Medicine has re-popularized the use of honey and apple cider vinegar in modern times."

He died at the Girouard Nursing Home in South Barre, Vermont, at the age of 85. The cause of death was a chronic kidney infection, coupled with cerebral thrombosis and arteriosclerosis.

After his death in 1966, Jarvis's office was dismantled and shipped to the Shelburne Museum, where it was reconstructed and is still displayed, as an example of a small-town Vermont doctor's office.

== Reception ==
In 1960, copies of Jarvis' book Folk Medicine were seized by the Food and Drug Administration in connection with sales of "Honegar". Physician Louis Lasagna noted that:

In Albany, New York, FDA agents seized $60,000 worth of "Honegar," a mixture of honey and apple cider vinegar, because its labeling failed to bear adequate directions for treating nearly fifty diseases and conditions for which "Honegar" was intended to be used. Seized with the mixture were reprints and quotations from Jarvis' book. (Jarvis was apparently uninvolved in the commercial manufacture of the product.)

Jarvis promoted the idea that apple cider vinegar and honey could be used to cure arthritis, diabetes, high blood pressure, heart disease and many others. Medical authorities dismissed these claims as nonsense and quackery.

== Books ==
- Folk Medicine: A Vermont Doctor's Guide to Good Health (1958). New York: Holt. ISBN 978-1447446378
- Arthritis and Folk Medicine (1960). New York: Holt, Rinehart and Winston.
