= Wafu dressing =

Vinaigrette salad dressing from Japan

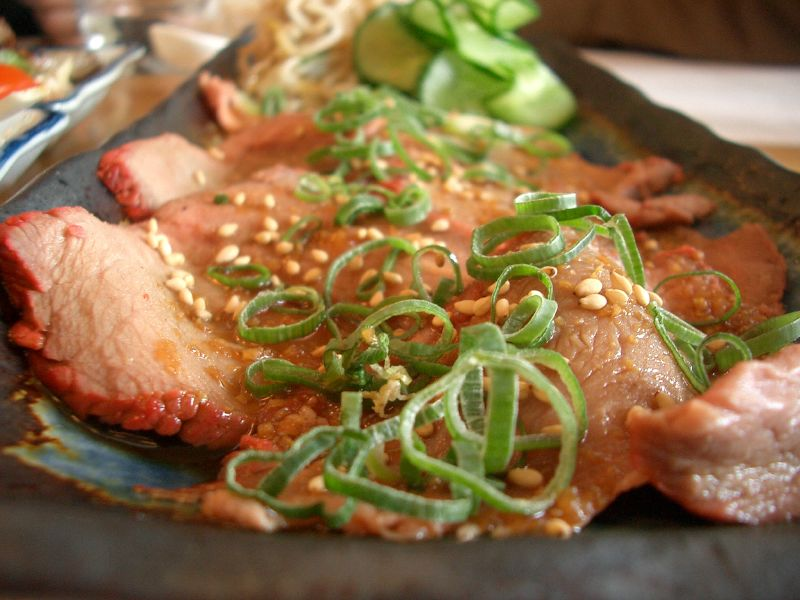
- Wafu steak
- Type: Salad dressing
- Place of origin: Japan
- Main ingredients: Japanese soy sauce, mirin, rice vinegar, vegetable oil
- Variations: Chūka-fū dressing

Wafu dressing (和風ドレッシング, wafū doresshingu), literally "Japanese-style dressing", is a vinaigrette-type salad dressing based on tosazu (土佐酢), a Japanese flavored vinegar.

The standard wafu dressing consists of a mixture of Japanese soy sauce, rice vinegar, mirin, and vegetable oil. There are many variations flavoured with additional ingredients, such as aonori, shiso, grated ginger, katsuobushi, umeboshi puree, wasabi, or citrus fruits, such as lemon or yuzu. A variation incorporating sesame oil is chūka dressing (中華ドレッシング) 'Chinese dressing' and a salad dressed with chūka dressing is chūka-fū salad (中華風サラダ) 'Chinese-style salad'.

== See also ==
- Ginger dressing
- Japanese cuisine
