= Shanxi mature vinegar =

Special food product of Shanxi Province, China

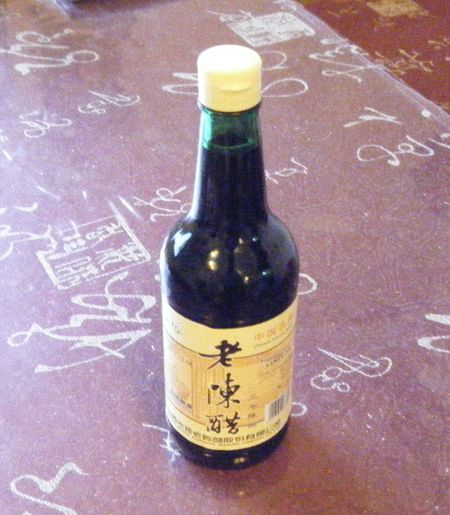
A bottle of Shanxi mature vinegar

Shanxi mature vinegar (Chinese: 山西老陈醋) is a type of Chinese vinegar. It is a product of Shanxi Province.

== Description ==
Shanxi Mature Vinegar is made from sorghum, barley, peas and other grains through steaming, fermenting, smoking, pouring and drying. It is one of the “four famous vinegars” of China. The history of the Shanxi mature vinegar spans over 3,000 years. The vinegar is particularly famous for its five characteristics: color, aroma, alcohol, concentration and sourness. Shanxi mature vinegar is rich in amino acids, organic acids, sugars, vitamins and salts, compared to other vinegars.

Zhenjiang aromatic vinegar and Sichuan Baoning bran vinegar are similar products that are aged with fermented grains instead of new vinegar, and the aging period is 20–30 days and about one year respectively; Shanxi vinegar is aged with new vinegar instead of fermented grains, and the aging period is generally 9–12 months. Some varieties are aged for several years.

The total acid content of Shanxi mature vinegar ranges from 9 to 11 percent. Due to the conversion of ester and acid, the condensation of alcohols and aldehydes, and the increase of the proportion of non-volatile acids in the aging process, aged vinegar is less acidic than new vinegar.

=== Function ===
As early as the Han dynasty, Hua Tuo had used vinegar to treat abdominal pain caused by roundworms, and in ancient Rome, vinegar was used to treat wounds and to sanitize. In Shanxi, there is a folk proverb that "you don't need to go to the drugstore if you have two liang of vinegar at home". Several health claims have been attributed to vinegar, which vary in their veracity.

In Shanxi daily life, vinegar is widely used by the general population.

=== Flavor ===
Shanxi mature vinegar is known for its distinctive aroma and rich flavor compared to other Chinese vinegars. Research has identified several key compounds contributing to its unique taste, including acetic acid (responsible for the classic vinegar sharpness), propanoic acid (imparting fatty notes), butanoic acid (with a hint of cheese-like aroma), and furfural (giving roasted, caramel-like undertones).

An aroma wheel, a graphical tool used to visually describe different aroma characteristics, indicates that Shanxi mature vinegar features prominent fatty and roasty aromas, along with woody, nutty, fruity, and floral undertones. The variations in aroma and taste among Shanxi mature vinegar samples mainly result from differences in raw ingredients and aging processes. Producers manage these variables carefully to ensure consistency in quality.

== History ==
Vinegar was known as acyl in ancient times. There is a record in the Rites of Zhou stating that "the palms of the people and the palms are the same", showing that vinegar has been brewed in the Western Zhou dynasty. Jinyang (now Taiyuan) is considered the birthplace of Chinese vinegar.

Historical records indicate that there was a vinegar workshop in Jinyang in the eighth century BC. There are many records about vinegar in ancient books, such as Bencao Gangmu, in which there are allusions about vinegar circulating among the people.

After the Tang and Song dynasties, due to progress and development in microbes and koji making technology, various fermentation starter products were produced. During the Ming dynasty, some of these products were known as Daqu, Xiaoqu and Hongqu. Shanxi vinegar uses the "red starter", Hongqu, as the koji in its production.

- 1368: Meiheju, a vinegar manufactory, founded the "fumigation method", and "white vinegar" became "black vinegar".
- 1644：Shanxi vinegar (smoked vinegar, fruit vinegar, rice vinegar, etc.) became famous with the rapid development of Shanxi merchants. Meiheju founded the technology of "fishing for ice in winter and drying in summer". As "fishing for ice in winter and drying in summer" takes years to accumulate, Shanxi vinegar is known as "Shanxi mature vinegar". The history of Shanxi vinegar has gradually evolved into the development history of Shanxi mature vinegar.
- 1956：The government of Qingxu County, Shanxi Province joined forces with 21 vinegar-making workshops such as Meiheju to set up a public-private Qingxu Qu vinegar factory in Shanxi Province.
- 2011: Shanxi Mature Vinegar Group became the only national condiment industry and "national intangible cultural heritage productive protection demonstration base" in Shanxi Province.
- 2021: The Regulations on the Protection of Shanxi Mature Vinegar was adopted at the 31st meeting of the Standing Committee of the 13th People's Congress of Shanxi Province, which came into force on January 1, 2022.

== Production ==
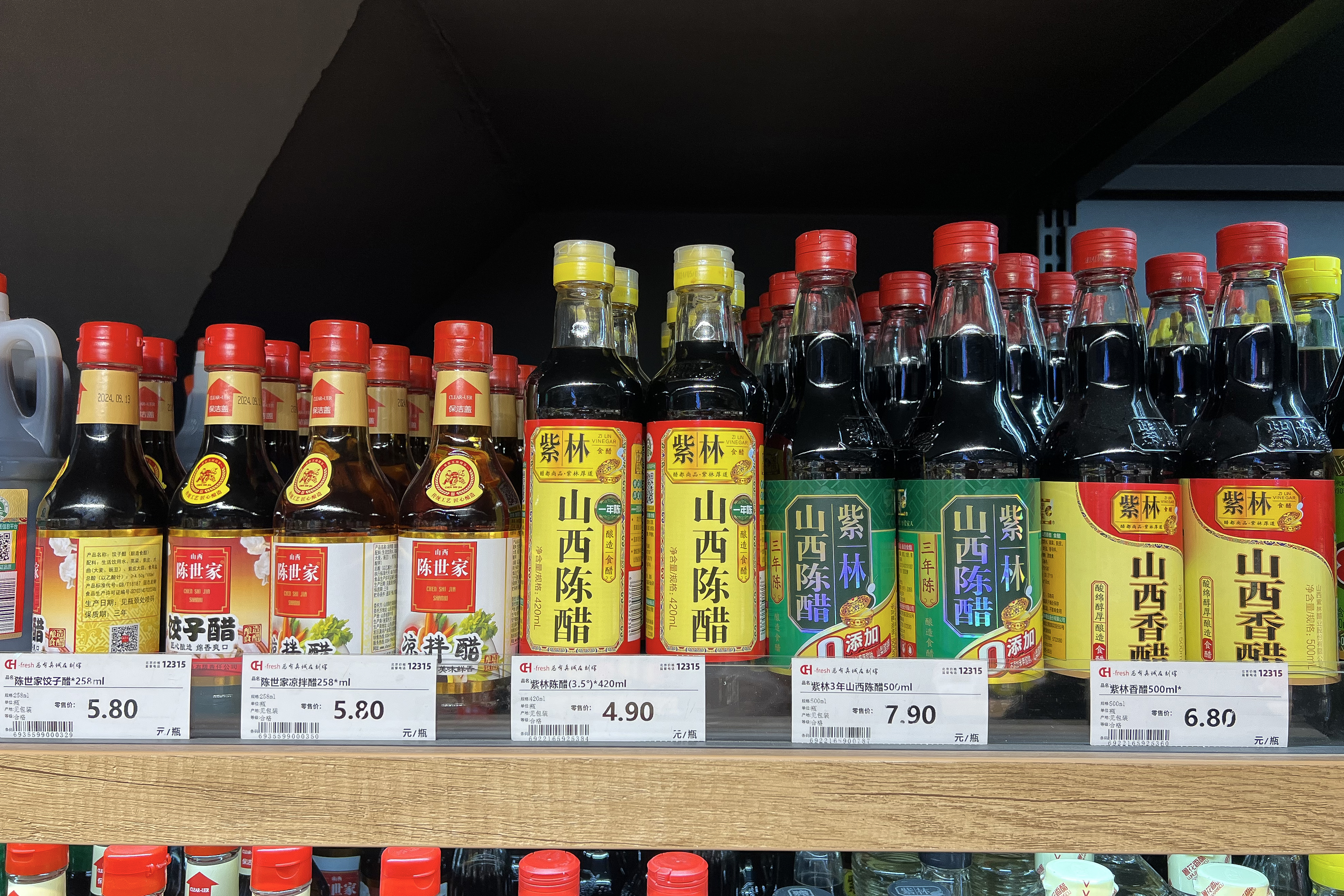
Several bottles of vinegar on sale at a Beijing supermarket

In 2006, the output of mature vinegar in Shanxi was 300,000 tons, accounting for one-tenth of the total output of vinegar in China.

In 2011, the output of Shanxi vinegar was about 600,000 tons, accounting for about 18% of the entire vinegar market in China, while aged vinegar accounted for about 70% of Shanxi vinegar.

In 2012, the actual output of Shanxi mature vinegar was 770,000 tons, and the total sales revenue was 2.206 billion yuan, an increase of 9.91% over 2011. The total profit was 265 million yuan, an increase of 0.76%. The vinegar industry in Shanxi Province opened 218 mature vinegar stores outside the province.

== Awards ==
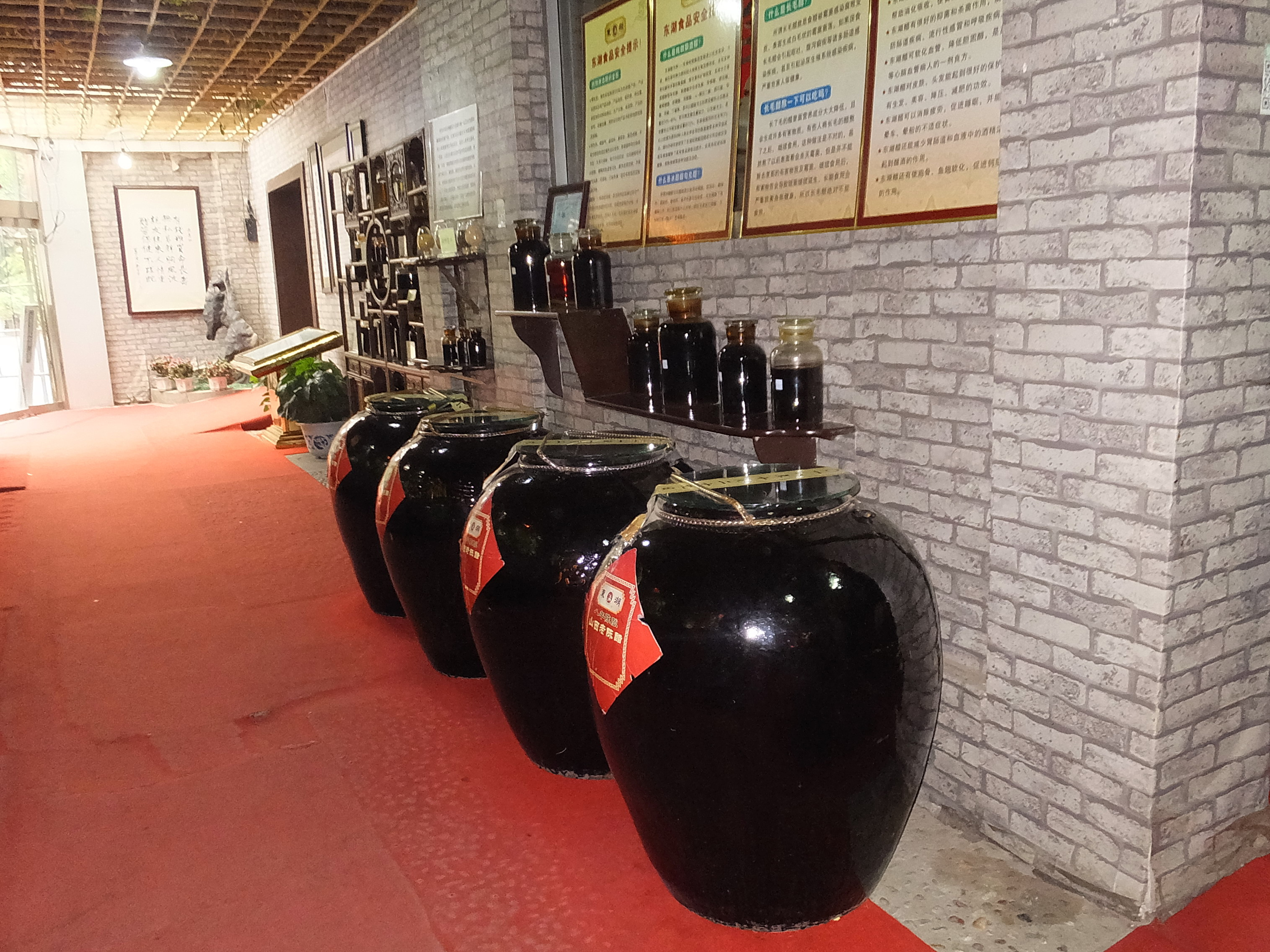
Aging jars at Donghu Vinegar Factory

- In 1924, at the Panama International Exposition, Qingxu Mature Vinegar won first prize.
- In 1993, "Donghu" won a title in the category of "China Time-honored Brands".
- In 2006, the traditional brewing technique of "Shuita" mature vinegar won the title in the category of "National Intangible Cultural Heritage".
- In 2006, the Ministry of Commerce of the People's Republic of China awarded "East Lake" the certificate and plaque of "China Time-honored Brands".
- On January 31, 2012, at the awarding ceremony of "National Intangible Cultural Heritage Productive Protection Demonstration Bases" held in Beijing, the manufactory Meiheju's mature vinegar brewing skills won the title.
- On December 23, 2019, the 5th China Agricultural Brand Annual Ceremony opened in Chengdu Tongwei International Center. At the meeting, the list of the "Top 100 Iconic Brands of China's Agricultural Products" was officially released, and Shanxi Mature Vinegar and other brands were selected.
- On July 20, 2020, Shanxi Mature Vinegar was included in the first protection list of geographical indications in China and Europe.

== Requirements ==
Producers within the region of origin of Shanxi mature vinegar must apply to the reporting agency established by the local Bureau of Quality and Technical Supervision in order to use the "Special Mark for Products of the Region of Origin" of Shanxi mature vinegar. Products must also pass a preliminary examination, which is announced by the General Administration of Quality Supervision, Inspection and Quarantine Only after approval can the "Special Mark for Products of the Region of Origin" of Shanxi Mature Vinegar be used. This mark is similar to that of products sold under denominación de origen systems.

The vinegar is on the Chinese list of Geographical Indication-protected products. There is a standard associated, GB/T 19777.

== Related stories ==
=== Bai Letian praises vinegar and leaves poems ===
According to legend, when Bai Juyi lived in Ludaoli, because his residence was adjacent to the temple, he had close contacts with the monks, who gave each other gifts. One day, Elder Shenxiu went to Ludao to drink tea with Le Tian and chat about the miraculous effect of wine. Shenxiu asks Le Tian for a sentence. Le Tian uses vinegar to study ink, and writes with a swipe of a pen:

Competitive biography in the Palace of Eternal Life. Where there is no agreement, whoever depends on each other will feel more sour than sweet when sick.

This Tibetan acrostic poem hides the four characters "the elder has no disease", which has been taken to mean that the elder Shenxiu can live a long and healthy life because he often eats vinegar.

=== Empress Wu Zetian drank vinegar to cure her illness ===
According to legend, Wu Zetian once felt unwell and often didn't want to eat. The imperial doctors tried their best, but to no avail, and one imperial doctor was punished for this. Later, a Taoist priest offered mature vinegar, and Wu Zetian's appetite improved after eating it. From then on, Wu Zetian always put out a pot of vinegar when eating. This custom spread to the common folk, and it has been passed down to this day.
