= Sekanjabin =

Iranian beverage

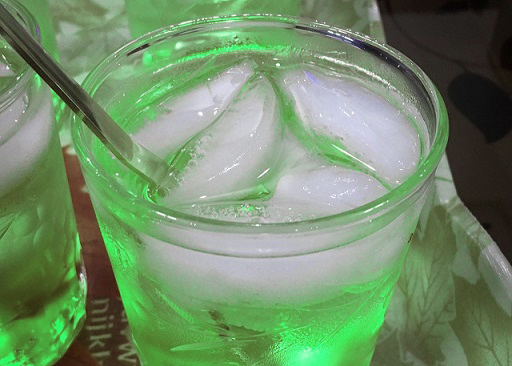

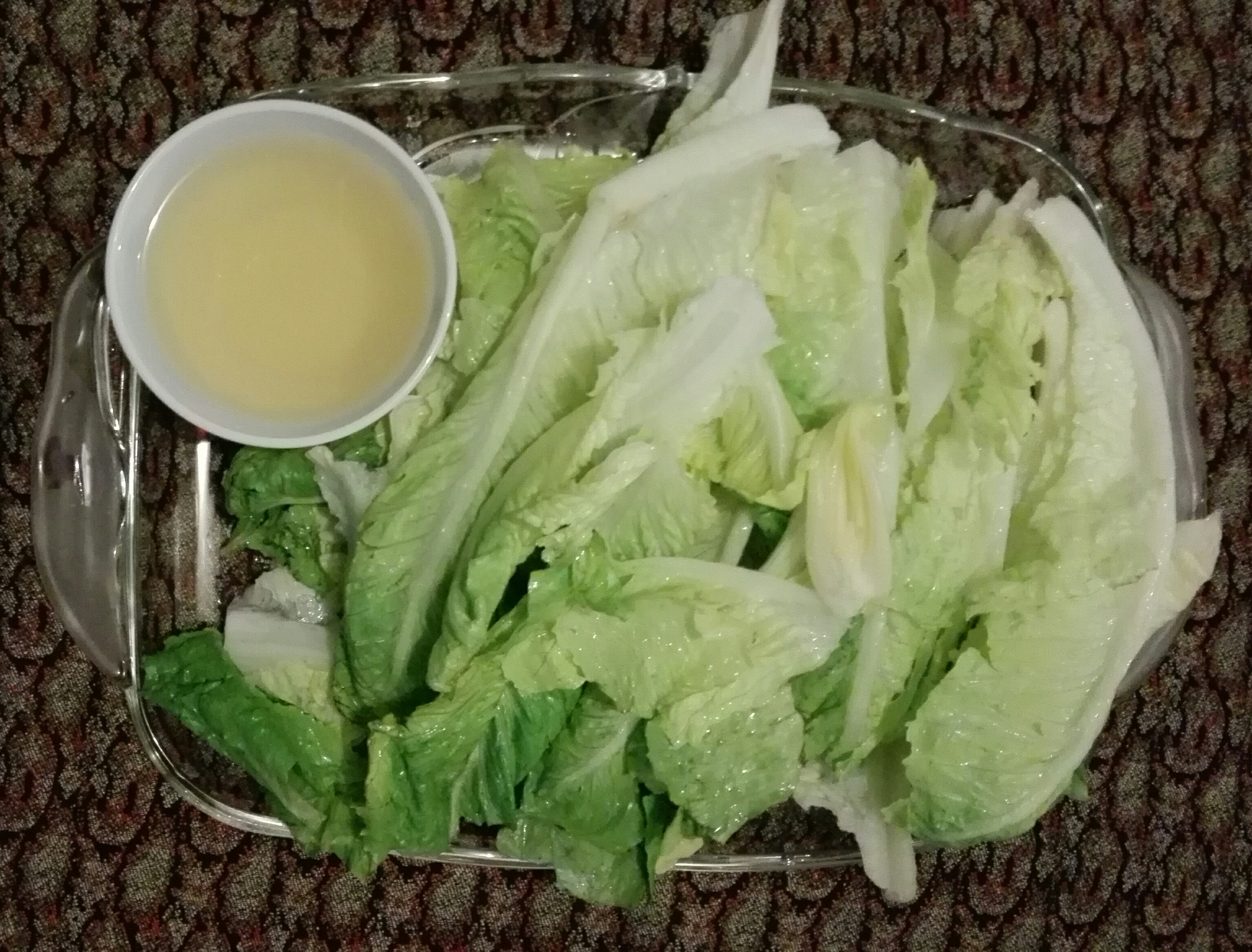
Lettuce and sekanjabin, popular during Sizdah Be-dar

Sekanjabin (Persian: سکنجبین) is an Iranian drink made of honey and vinegar, usually served in summer. It is sometimes seasoned with mint.

== Etymology ==
Sekanjabin is the Arabicised form of sekangabin (سکنگبین, sikangibīn), itself a compound of the Middle Persian سرکه serke ("vinegar") and انگبین angabin ("honey").

== See also ==
- Oxymel
- Shrub (drink)
- Switchel
