= Vinegar =

Liquid consisting mainly of acetic acid and water

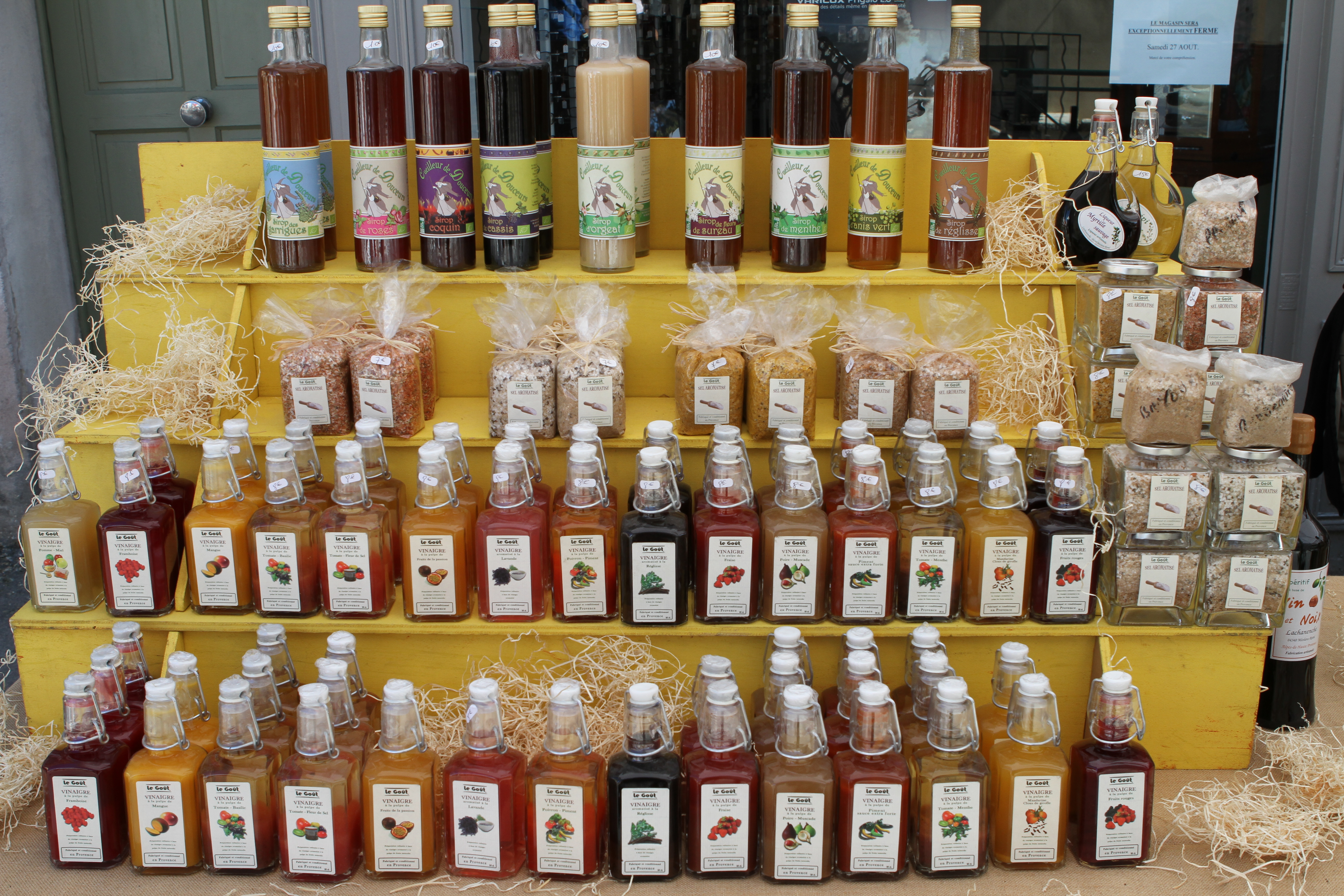
A variety of flavored vinegars, for culinary use, on sale in France

Vinegar (from Old French vyn egre 'sour wine') is an odorous aqueous solution of diluted acetic acid and trace compounds that may include flavorings or naturally occurring organic compounds. Vinegar typically contains from 4% to 18% acetic acid by volume.

Usually, the acetic acid is produced by a double fermentation – converting simple sugars to ethanol using yeast, and then converting ethanol to acetic acid using acetic acid bacteria. Many types of vinegar are made, depending on source materials.

The product is now mainly used in the culinary arts as a flavorful, acidic cooking ingredient, salad dressing, or pickling agent. Various types are used as condiments or garnishes, including balsamic vinegar and malt vinegar.

As an easily manufactured mild acid, it has a wide variety of industrial and domestic uses, including functioning as a household cleaner.

== Etymology ==
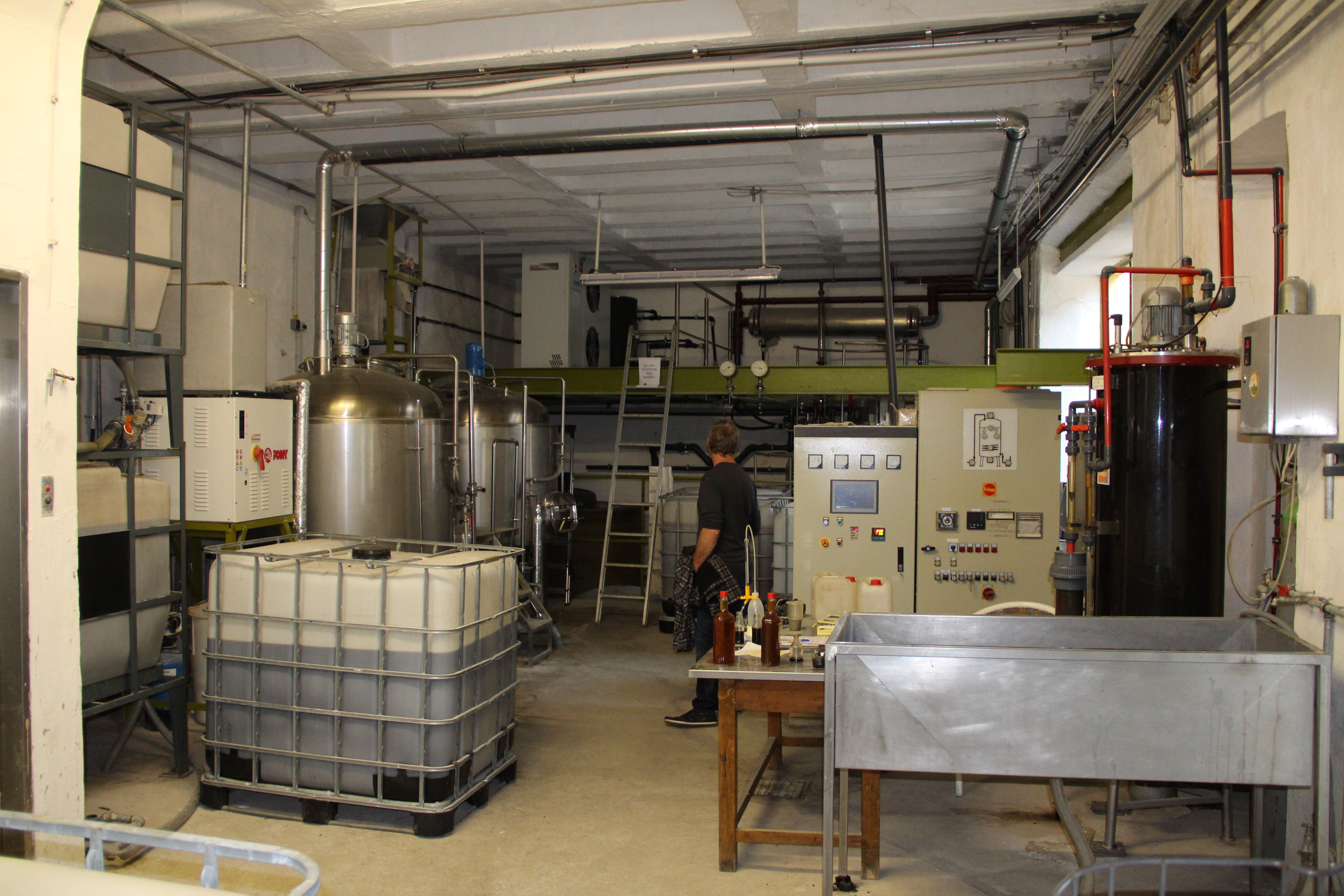
Fast aerobic fermentation stainless steel vessels

The word vinegar arrived in Middle English from Old French (vyn egre 'sour wine'), which in turn derives from Latin: vīnum 'wine' + ācre (neuter gender of ācer 'sour'). Vinegar was formerly also called eisel.

The word acetic derives from Latin acētum ('vinegar', or more properly vinum acetum 'wine turned sour').

== History ==
While vinegar making may be as old as brewing, the first documented evidence of vinegar making and use was by the ancient Babylonians around 3000 BCE. They primarily made vinegar from the fermentation of fruits, dates, figs, and beer and used it for both culinary and medicinal purposes. Its uses then spread to neighboring lands; traces of it have been found in Egyptian urns.

In East Asia, the Chinese began professionalizing vinegar production in the Zhou dynasty. The book Zhou Li mentions that many noble or royal households had a "vinegar maker" as a specialized occupation. Most vinegar-making then was concentrated in what is now Shanxi province near the city of Taiyuan, which remains a famous vinegar-making region today. Many Chinese kinds of vinegar and their uses for culinary and medicinal purposes were written in the agricultural manual Qimin Yaoshu (齊民要術).

The Greeks and Romans frequently used vinegar made from wine. The Spartans had vinegar as a part of their traditional black soup (melas zomos; a blood soup); in addition to flavoring the broth, the acidity of the vinegar prevented the blood from coagulating (a purpose for which vinegar is still used in modern blood soups around the world). The Roman Columella described the ingredients and process for making several types of vinegar in his work Res Rustica.

In the late Middle Ages, vinegar making was slowly being professionalized in Europe, with the French city of Orléans becoming particularly famous for the quality of its vinegar through a formalized fermentation and aging process, which became known as the Orléans process. During this time, malt vinegar also began to develop in England, where it was first known as alegar. Balsamic vinegar also began its evolution in the Duchy of Modena in Italy, though it would not become widely known until the Napoleonic Wars after being sold abroad by French troops.

In the 19th century, vinegar production underwent many dramatic changes, such as rapid industrialization and scientific analysis. Karl Sebastian Schüzenbach invented the first large-scale industrial process for vinegar production in the Kingdom of Baden in 1823. Known as the packed generator, it circulated alcohol over beechwood shavings to reduce fermentation times from several months down to 1–2 weeks. This process also facilitated the rise of vinegar made from pure alcohol called spirit vinegar or distilled white vinegar. Japan also began industrializing vinegar production during the last days of the Tokugawa shogunate, when Matazaemon Nakano, a man from a traditional sake brewing family, discovered that sake lees could be used to make rice vinegar. This helped provide ample vinegar for the burgeoning popularity of sushi in Japan. The company he founded, now known as Mizkan, is headquartered in Handa (near Nagoya) and is the largest vinegar producer in the world.

Meanwhile, vinegar fermentation became understood as a natural and biological process. Louis Pasteur made the decisive discovery that a special type of bacteria, later known as acetic acid bacteria, was the agent of fermentation for vinegar production.

In the 20th century, vinegar production was again revolutionized by the invention of the submerged fermentation process that cut production times down to 1–2 days. This allowed the mass production of cheap vinegar around the world.

== Chemistry ==
The conversion of ethanol (CH_{3}CH_{2}OH) and oxygen (O_{2}) to acetic acid (CH_{3}COOH) takes place by the following reaction:

CH_{3}CH_{2}OH + O_{2} → CH_{3}COOH + H_{2}O

=== Polyphenols ===
Vinegar contains numerous flavonoids, phenolic acids, and aldehydes, which vary in content depending on the source material used to make the vinegar, such as orange peel or various fruit juice concentrates.

== Production ==
Commercial vinegar is produced either by a fast or a slow fermentation process. In general, slow methods are used in traditional vinegars, where fermentation proceeds over the course of a few months to a year. The longer fermentation period allows for the accumulation of a nontoxic slime composed of acetic acid bacteria and their cellulose biofilm, known as mother of vinegar.

Fast methods add the aforementioned mother of vinegar as a bacterial culture to the source liquid before adding air to oxygenate and promote the fastest fermentation. In fast production processes, vinegar may be produced in 1–3 days.

== Varieties ==
The source materials for making vinegar are varied – different fruits, grains, alcoholic beverages, and other fermentable materials are used.

=== Fruit ===
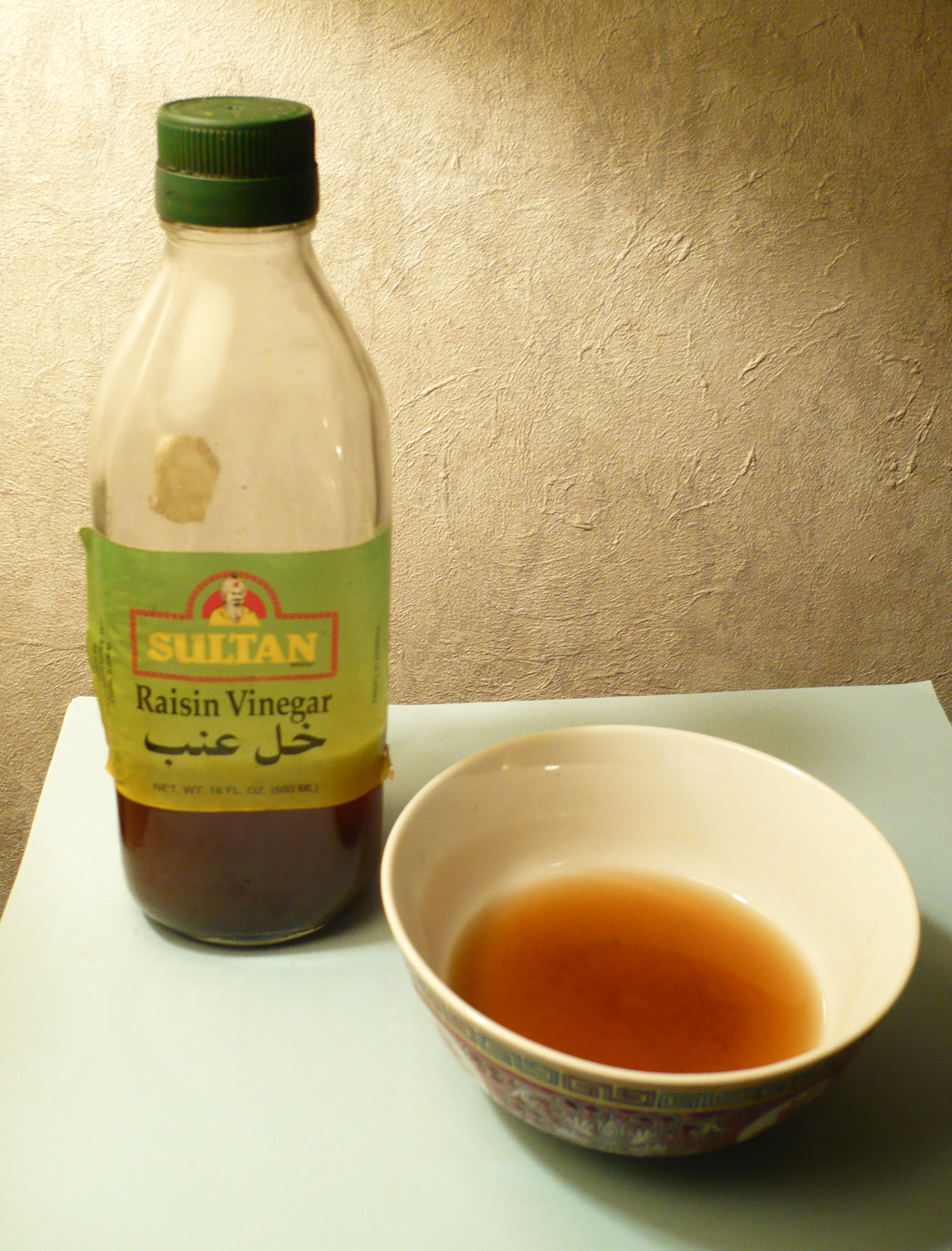
Raisin vinegar

Fruit vinegars are made from fruit wines, usually without any additional flavoring. Common flavors of fruit vinegar include apple, blackcurrant, raspberry, quince, and tomato. Typically, the flavors of the original fruits remain in the final product. Most fruit vinegars are produced in Europe, where a market exists for high-priced vinegars made solely from specific fruits (as opposed to nonfruit vinegars that are infused with fruits or fruit flavors). Several varieties are produced in Asia. Persimmon vinegar, called gam sikcho, is common in South Korea. Jujube vinegar, called zaocu or hongzaocu, and wolfberry vinegar are produced in China.

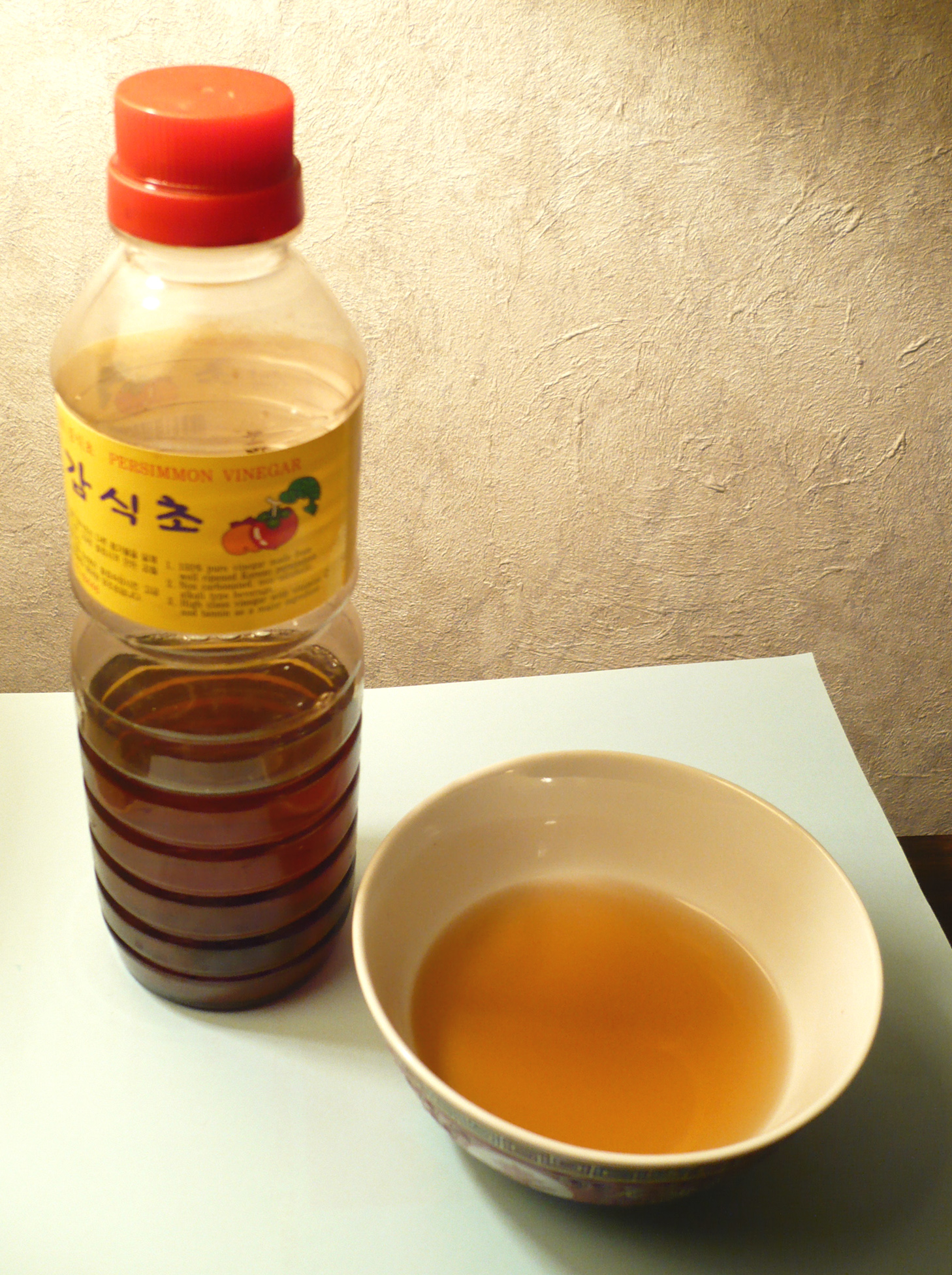
Persimmon vinegar produced in South Korea

Apple cider vinegar is made from cider or apple must, and has a brownish-gold color. It is sometimes sold unfiltered and unpasteurized with the mother of vinegar present. It can be diluted with fruit juice or water or sweetened (usually with honey) for consumption.

A byproduct of commercial kiwifruit growing is a large amount of waste in the form of misshapen or otherwise-rejected fruit (which may constitute up to 30% of the crop) and kiwifruit pomace. One of the uses for pomace is the production of kiwifruit vinegar, produced commercially in New Zealand since at least the early 1990s, and in China in 2008.

Vinegar made from raisins is used in cuisines of the Middle East. It is cloudy and medium brown in color, with a mild flavor. Vinegar made from dates is a traditional product of the Middle East, and used in Eastern Arabia.

=== Palm ===
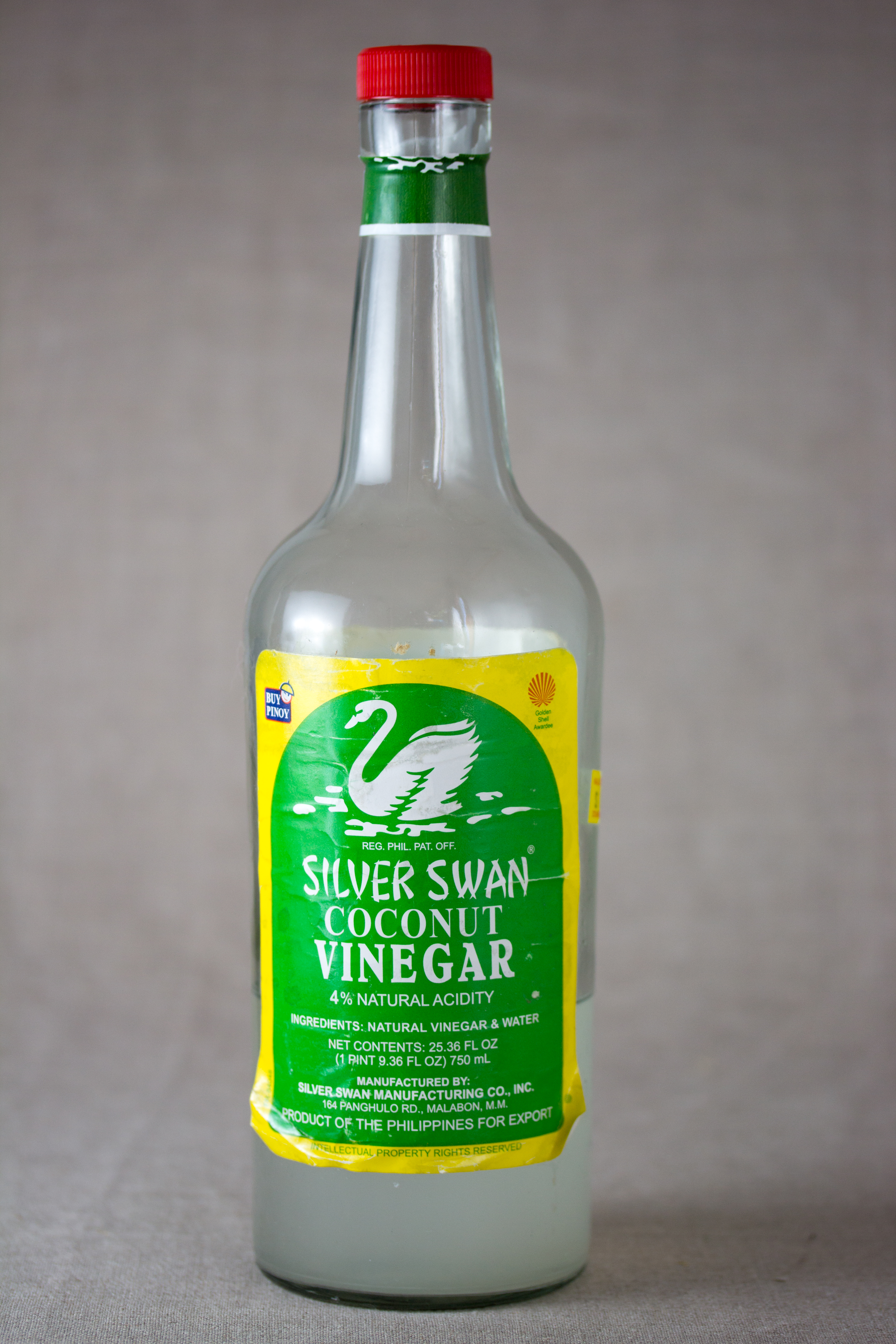
Coconut vinegar from the Philippines

Coconut vinegar, made from fermented coconut sap or coconut water, is used extensively in Southeast Asian cuisine (notably the Philippines, where it is known as sukang tuba), as well as in some cuisines of India and Sri Lanka, especially Goan cuisine. A cloudy, white liquid, it has a particularly sharp, acidic taste with a slightly yeasty note.

In the Philippines, other types of vinegar are made from palm sap. Like coconut vinegar, they are by-products of tubâ (palm wine) production. Two of the most widely produced are nipa palm vinegar (sukang nipa or sukang sasa) and kaong palm vinegar (sukang kaong or sukang irok). Along with coconut and cane vinegar, they are the four main traditional vinegar types in the Philippines and are an important part of Filipino cuisine. Nipa palm vinegar is made from the sap of the leaf stalks of nipa palm. Its flavor has notes of citrus and imparts a distinctly musky aroma. Kaong palm vinegar is made from the sap of flower stalks of the kaong palm. It is sweeter than all the other Philippine vinegar types and is commonly used in salad dressing. Vinegar from the buri palm sap is also produced, but not with the same prevalence as coconut, nipa, and kaong vinegars. Kaong palm vinegar is also produced in Indonesia and Malaysia, though it is not as prevalent as in the Philippines because the palm wine industry is not as widespread in these Muslim-majority countries.

=== Balsamic ===
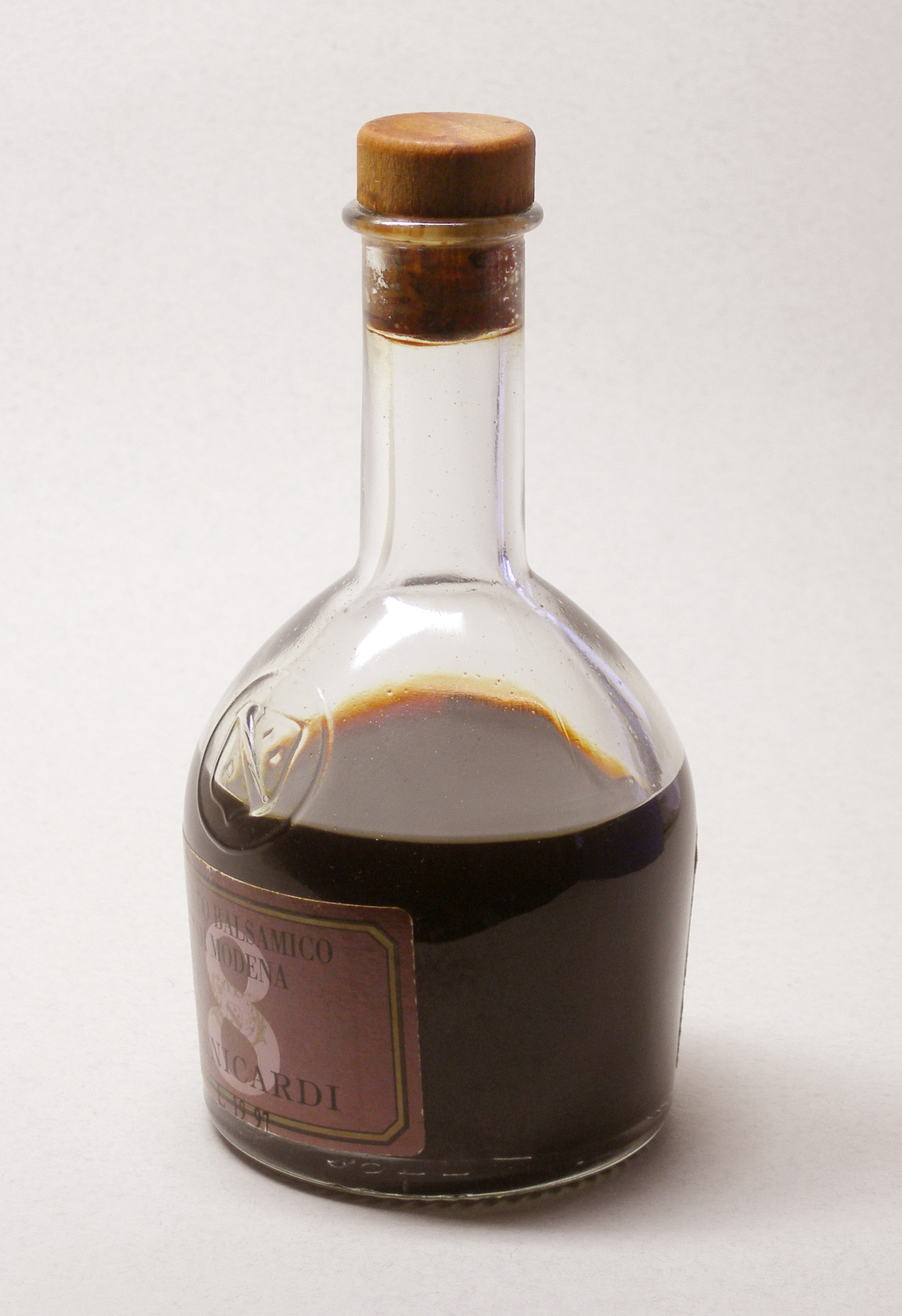
Bottle of Balsamic Vinegar

Balsamic vinegar is an aromatic, aged vinegar produced in the Modena and Reggio Emilia provinces of Italy. The original product — traditional balsamic vinegar — is made from the concentrated juice, or must, of white Trebbiano grapes. It is dark brown, rich, sweet, and complex, with the finest grades being aged in successive casks made variously of oak, mulberry, chestnut, cherry, juniper, and ash wood. Originally a costly product available to only the Italian upper classes, traditional balsamic vinegar is marked tradizionale or "DOC" to denote its protected designation of origin status, and is aged for 12 to 25 years. A cheaper non-DOC commercial form described as aceto balsamico di Modena (balsamic vinegar of Modena) became widely known and available around the world in the late 20th century, typically made with concentrated grape juice mixed with a strong vinegar, then colored and slightly sweetened with caramel and sugar.

Balsamic vinegar is made from a grape product. It contains no balsam, though was traditionally aged in balsam as one of the steps. A high acidity level is somewhat hidden by the sweetness of the other ingredients, making it mellow. In terms of its nutrition content, balsamic vinegar contains the carbohydrates of grape sugars (some 17% of total composition), making it some five times higher in caloric content than typical distilled or wine vinegar.

=== Cane ===
Vinegar made from sugarcane juice is traditional to and is most popular in the Philippines, in particular in the northern Ilocos Region (where it is called sukang Iloko or sukang basi). It ranges from dark yellow to golden brown in color, and has a mellow flavor, similar in some respects to rice vinegar, though with a somewhat "fresher" taste. Because it contains no residual sugar, it is no sweeter than any other vinegar. In the Philippines, it often is labeled as sukang maasim (Tagalog for "sour vinegar").

Cane vinegars from Ilocos are made in two different ways. One way is to simply place sugar cane juice in large jars; it becomes sour by the direct action of bacteria on the sugar. The other way is through fermentation to produce a traditional wine known as basi. Low-quality basi is then allowed to undergo acetic acid fermentation that converts alcohol into acetic acid. Contaminated basi also becomes vinegar.

Cane vinegar is also produced in other countries, like France and the United States. A white variation has become quite popular in Brazil in recent years, where it is the cheapest type of vinegar sold. It is now common for other types of vinegar (made from wine, rice, and apple cider) to be sold mixed with cane vinegar to lower the cost.

Sugarcane vinegar, locally called sirka is made from sugarcane juice in parts of northern India. During summer, people put cane juice in earthenware pots or glassware containers with iron nails. This iron is used to promote growth of acetic acid bacteria and yeast (which use iron for their metabolism). The fermentation takes place due to the action of wild yeast. The cane juice is converted to vinegar having a color ranging from amber and if left for long,the color deepens into an almost-black color (from ferrous oxide and acetate). The sirka is used to preserve pickles and for flavoring curries.

=== Grains ===
Malt vinegar made from ale, also called "alegar", is made by malting barley, causing the starch in the grain to turn to maltose. Then an ale is brewed from the maltose and allowed to turn into vinegar, which is then aged. It is typically light-brown in color. Malt vinegar (along with salt) is a traditional seasoning for fish and chips, and in the United Kingdom and Canada, a popular seasoning for French fries in general. Some fish and chip shops replace it with non-brewed condiment. Salt and vinegar are combined as a common, traditional flavoring for crisps; in some varieties this involves the conversion of the vinegar to sodium acetate or sodium diacetate, to avoid dampening the product in manufacture.

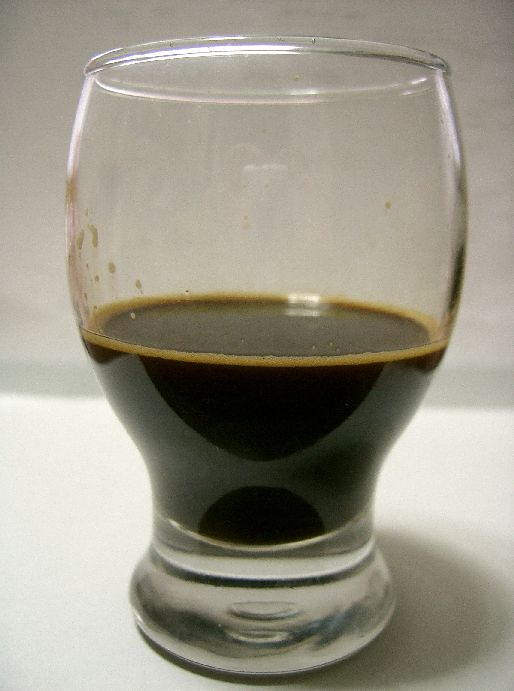
Chinese black vinegar

Chinese black vinegar is an aged product made from rice, wheat, millet, sorghum, or a combination of these. It has an inky black color and a complex, malty flavour. The recipe is not fixed, so some Chinese black vinegars may contain added sugar, spices, or caramel color. The most popular variety, Zhenjiang vinegar, originates in the city of Zhenjiang in Jiangsu Province, eastern China. Shanxi mature vinegar is another popular type of Chinese vinegar that is made exclusively from sorghum and other grains. Nowadays in Shanxi province, some traditional vinegar workshops still produce handmade vinegar with a high acidity that is aged for at least five years. Only the vinegars made in Taiyuan and some counties in Jinzhong and aged for at least three years are considered authentic Shanxi mature vinegar according to the latest national standard. A somewhat lighter form of black vinegar, made from rice, is produced in Japan, where it is called kurozu.

Rice vinegar is most popular in the cuisines of East and Southeast Asia. It is available in "white" (light yellow), red, and black varieties. The Japanese prefer a light rice vinegar for the preparation of sushi rice and salad dressings. Red rice vinegar traditionally is colored with red yeast rice. Black rice vinegar (made with black glutinous rice) is most popular in China, and it is also widely used in other East Asian countries. White rice vinegar has a mild acidity with a somewhat "flat" and uncomplex flavor. Some varieties of rice vinegar are sweetened or otherwise seasoned with spices or other added flavorings.

=== Spirits ===
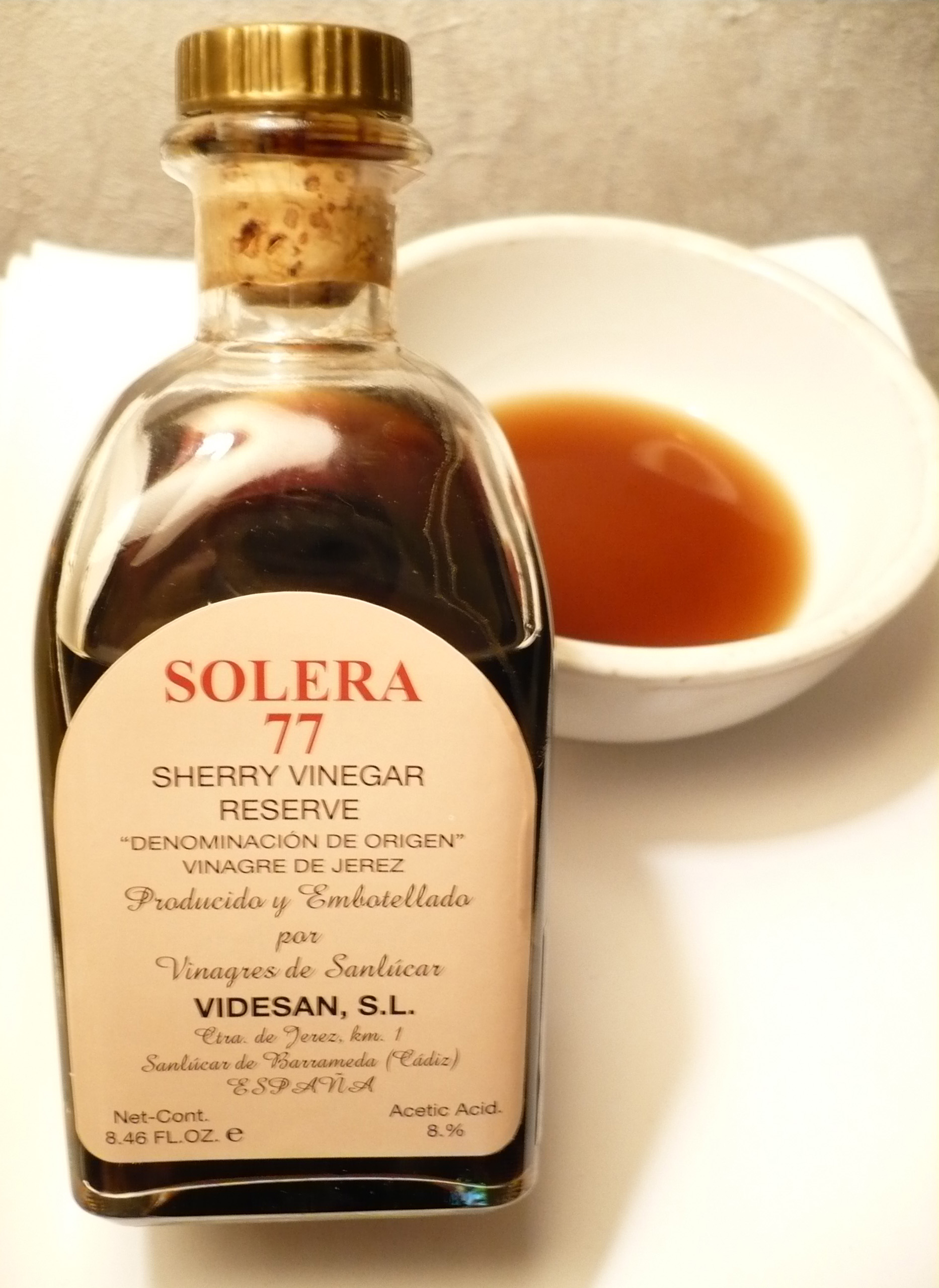
Sherry vinegar

The term "spirit vinegar" is sometimes reserved for the stronger variety (5% to 24% acetic acid) made from sugar cane or chemically produced acetic acid. To be called "spirit vinegar", the product must come from an agricultural source and must be made by "double fermentation". The first fermentation is sugar to alcohol, and the second is alcohol to acetic acid. Products made from synthetically produced acetic acid cannot be called "vinegar" in the UK, where the term allowed is "non-brewed condiment".

Wine vinegar is made from red or white wine, and is the most commonly used vinegar in Southern and Central Europe, Cyprus, and Israel. As with wine, the range in quality is considerable. Better-quality wine vinegars are matured in wood for up to two years, and exhibit a complex, mellow flavor. Wine vinegar tends to have a lower acidity than white or cider vinegar. More expensive wine vinegars are made from individual varieties of wine, such as champagne, sherry, or pinot gris. Rape vinegar is the historic name for wine vinegar made from the pomace of the grapes (the rape).

Sherry vinegar is linked to the production of sherry wines of Jerez. Dark mahogany in color, it is made exclusively from the acetic fermentation of wines. It is concentrated and has generous aromas, including a note of wood, ideal for vinaigrettes and flavoring various foods.

The term "distilled vinegar" as used in the United States (called "spirit vinegar" in the UK, "white vinegar" in Canada) is something of a misnomer because it is not produced by distillation of vinegar, but by fermentation of distilled alcohol. The fermentate is diluted to produce a colorless solution of 5 to 8% acetic acid in water, with a pH of about 2.6. This is variously known as distilled spirit, "virgin" vinegar, or white vinegar, and is used in cooking, baking, meat preservation, and pickling, as well as for medicinal, laboratory, and cleaning purposes. The most common starting material in some regions, because of its low cost, is barley malt, or in the United States, corn. It is sometimes derived from petroleum. Distilled vinegar is used predominantly for cooking, although in the UK it is used as an alternative to brown or light malt vinegar. White distilled vinegar can also be used for cleaning, and some types are sold specifically for this purpose.

== Culinary uses ==
Vinegar is commonly used in food preparation, in particular as pickling liquids, vinaigrettes, and other salad dressings. It is an ingredient in sauces, such as hot sauce, mustard, ketchup, and mayonnaise. Vinegar is sometimes used in chutneys. It is often used as a condiment on its own, or as a part of other condiments. Marinades often contain vinegar. Soups sometimes have vinegar added to them, as is the case with hot and sour soup. In terms of its shelf life, vinegar's acidic nature allows it to last indefinitely without the use of refrigeration; it is essentially already "spoiled".

=== Beverages ===
Beverages made using vinegar include posca in ancient Rome. The ancient Greek oxymel was made from vinegar and honey, and sekanjabin is a traditional Persian drink similar to oxymel. Other preparations, known colloquially as "shrubs", range from simply mixing sugar water or honey water with small amounts of fruity vinegar, to making syrup by laying fruit or mint in vinegar for several days, then sieving off solid parts and adding considerable amounts of sugar.

=== Diet and metabolism ===
Preliminary research indicates that consuming 2–4 tablespoons of vinegar may cause small reductions in postprandial levels of blood glucose and insulin in people with diabetes.

=== Nutrition ===
Distilled or red wine vinegar is 95% water, with no fat or protein. In a 100 mL (3 1/2 US fl oz) reference amount, distilled vinegar supplies 75 kJ (18 kcal) of food energy and no micronutrients in significant content. The composition (and absence of nutrient content) for red wine vinegar and apple cider vinegar are the same, whereas balsamic vinegar is 77% water with 17% carbohydrates, 370 kJ (88 kcal) per 100 mL, and contains no fat, protein, or micronutrients.

== Non-culinary uses ==
=== Folk medicine ===
Since antiquity, folk medicine treatments have used vinegar, but no conclusive evidence from clinical research supports health claims of benefits for weight loss, cancer, or use as a probiotic. A systematic review and meta-analysis later suggested it could help type 2 diabetics reduce insulin and glucose after meals.

Applying vinegar to common jellyfish stings deactivates the nematocysts, although not as effectively as hot water. This also applies to the Portuguese man o' war, which, although generally considered to be a jellyfish, is not (it is a siphonophore).

Some treatments with vinegar pose risks to health. Esophageal injury by apple cider vinegar has been reported, and because vinegar products sold for medicinal purposes are neither regulated nor standardized, such products may vary widely in content and acidity.

=== Cleaning ===
White vinegar is often used as a household cleaning agent. For most uses, dilution with water is recommended for safety and to avoid damaging the surfaces being cleaned. Because it is acidic, it can dissolve mineral deposits from glass, coffee makers, and other smooth surfaces. Vinegar is known as an effective cleaner of stainless steel and glass. Malt vinegar sprinkled onto crumpled newspaper is a traditional, and still-popular, method of cleaning grease-smeared windows and mirrors in the United Kingdom.

Vinegar can be used for polishing copper, brass, bronze or silver. It is an excellent solvent for cleaning epoxy resin as well as the gum on sticker-type price tags. It has been reported as an effective drain cleaner.

According to testing done by Consumer Reports, vinegar is ineffective as a rinse aid and in removing hard-water film while used in a dishwasher. According to Brian Sansoni, chief spokesperson for the American Cleaning Institute, vinegar "isn't very useful with stains that have already set into clothing, including food stains and bloodstains."

Other household items and surfaces that can be damaged by vinegar include flooring, stone countertops, knives, the screens of electronic devices, clothes, iron water tanks, and rubber components of various small appliances. Common metals that can be damaged by vinegar include aluminum, copper, and lower-quality grades of stainless steel often used in small appliances.

=== Herbicide ===
Vinegar can be used as a contact herbicide and is more effective at higher concentrations. Twenty percent acetic acid is commonly sold for this purpose. Acetic acid is non-selective and does not translocate so it must be applied to the base of the plant in order to kill the root system and avoid killing surrounding plants unintentionally. Vinegar does not provide residual plant suppression and must be reapplied as new plants germinate

== Reactions, byproducts and contaminants ==
Solutions above 10% require careful handling, as they are corrosive and damaging to the skin.

When a bottle of vinegar is opened, mother of vinegar may develop. It is considered harmless and can be removed by filtering.

When baking soda and vinegar are combined, the bicarbonate ion of the baking soda reacts with acetic acid to form carbonic acid, which decomposes into carbon dioxide and water, completing the carbon cycle. Sodium acetate remains in solution with the water contained in the vinegar.

== Regulation ==
Some countries have regulations on the permitted acidity percentage of vinegar. For example, the government of Canada limits acetic to between 4.1% and 12.3%, unless the vinegar is sold only for manufacturing use and identified as such. In the United States, Australia, and New Zealand, vinegar must contain a minimum of 4% acetic acid by volume.

Many jurisdictions distinguish between brewed vinegar and preparations made with diluted acetic acid. The latter may not be sold as "vinegar" and is instead referred to as "non-brewed condiment" in the UK, or "imitation vinegar" in Australia and New Zealand.

== See also ==
- Food additive
- List of condiments
- Sensory overload
- Vinegar tasters
- Vinegaroon
- Wood vinegar (pyroligneous acid)
