= Acidulated water =

Water with acid added

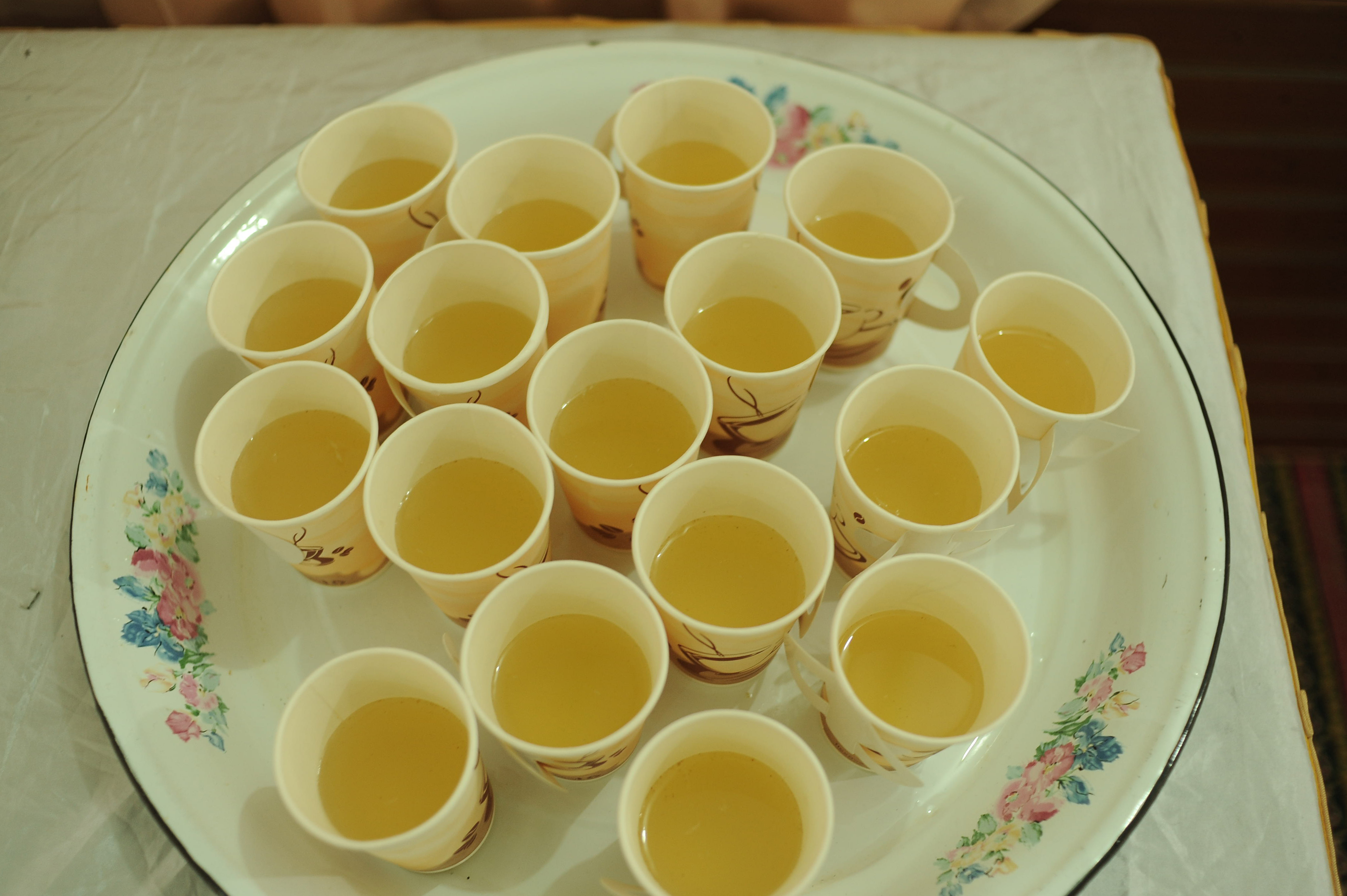
Tamarind water is a drink originating from South India, tamarind water made from squeezed limes and added with typical Indian spices such as anise and kadar munggu.

Acidulated water is water where some sort of acid is added—often lemon juice, lime juice, or vinegar—to prevent cut or skinned fruits or vegetables from browning so as to maintain their appearance. Some vegetables and fruits often placed in acidulated water are apples, avocados, celeriac, potatoes and pears. When the fruit or vegetable is removed from the mixture, it will usually resist browning for at least an hour or two, even though it is being exposed to oxygen.

An added benefit of placing items in acidulated water is that the food item acquires a taste of the acid used, which can be very pleasant on the palate.

Acidulated water, most often made with the use of vinegar, can be used on an aged, hanging beef carcass (butchered) to help clean it. The hanging primals or sub-primals can be wiped down with a cloth that has been submerged in the acidulated solution to help remove the "slick" surface that can build up during the aging process.
