= Zhenjiang vinegar =

Rice-based black vinegar

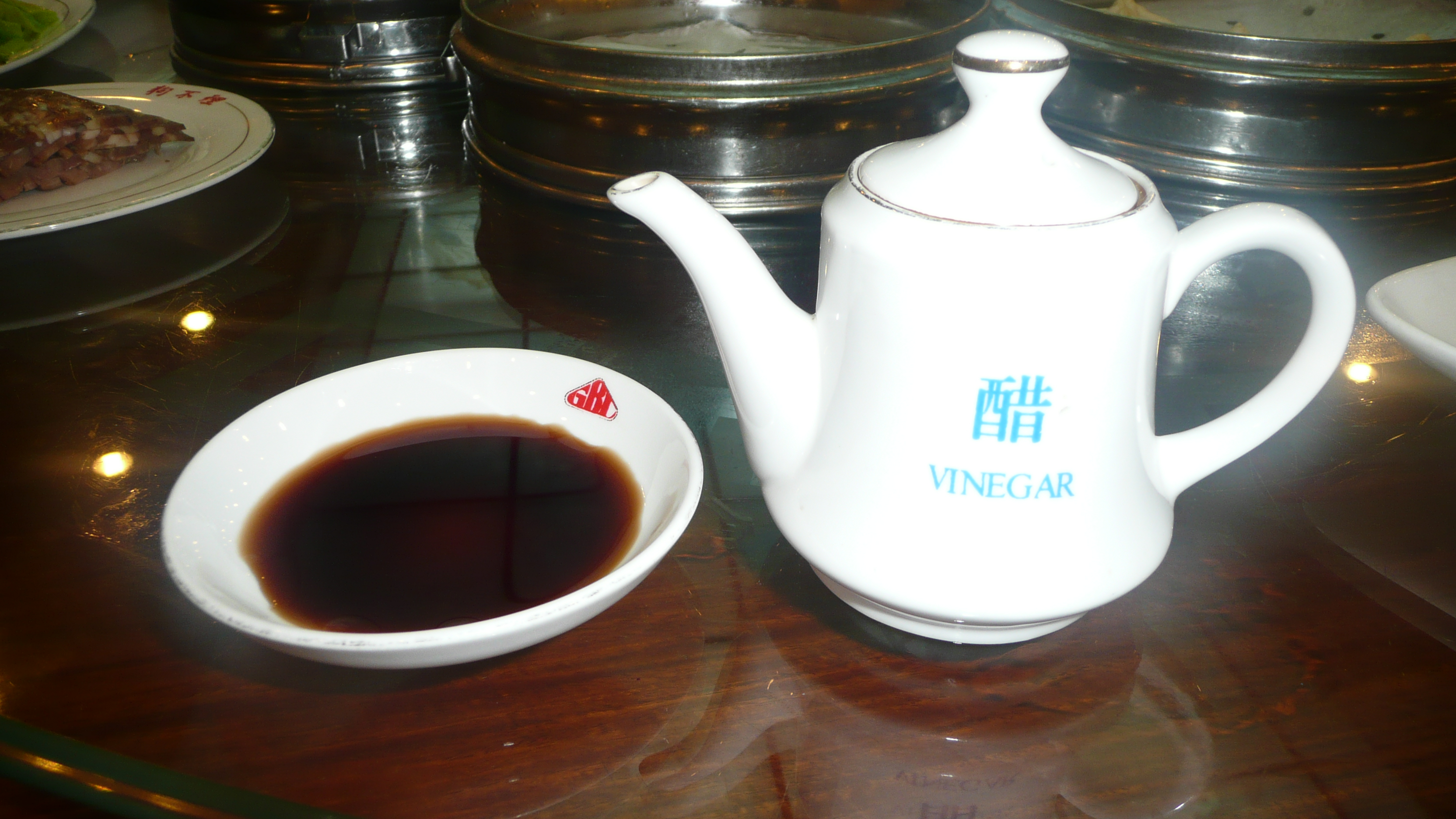
- Simplified Chinese: 镇江香醋
- Traditional Chinese: 鎭江香醋
- Literal meaning: Zhenjiang aromatic vinegar
Transcriptions
Standard Mandarin
- Hanyu Pinyin: Zhènjiāng xiāngcù

Zhenjiang Vinegar, also known as Chinkiang Vinegar, is a traditional glutinous rice-based black vinegar widely used in Chinese cuisine. A defining characteristic of the vinegar is its high concentration of non-volatile acids, which contributes to its complex, mellow flavour profile and distinguishes it from other regional varieties. Legally protected as a Geographical Indication (GI) in mainland China and a Protected Geographical Indication (PGI) in the European Union, the designation is strictly reserved for products manufactured within the Zhenjiang region that adhere to specific technical standards.

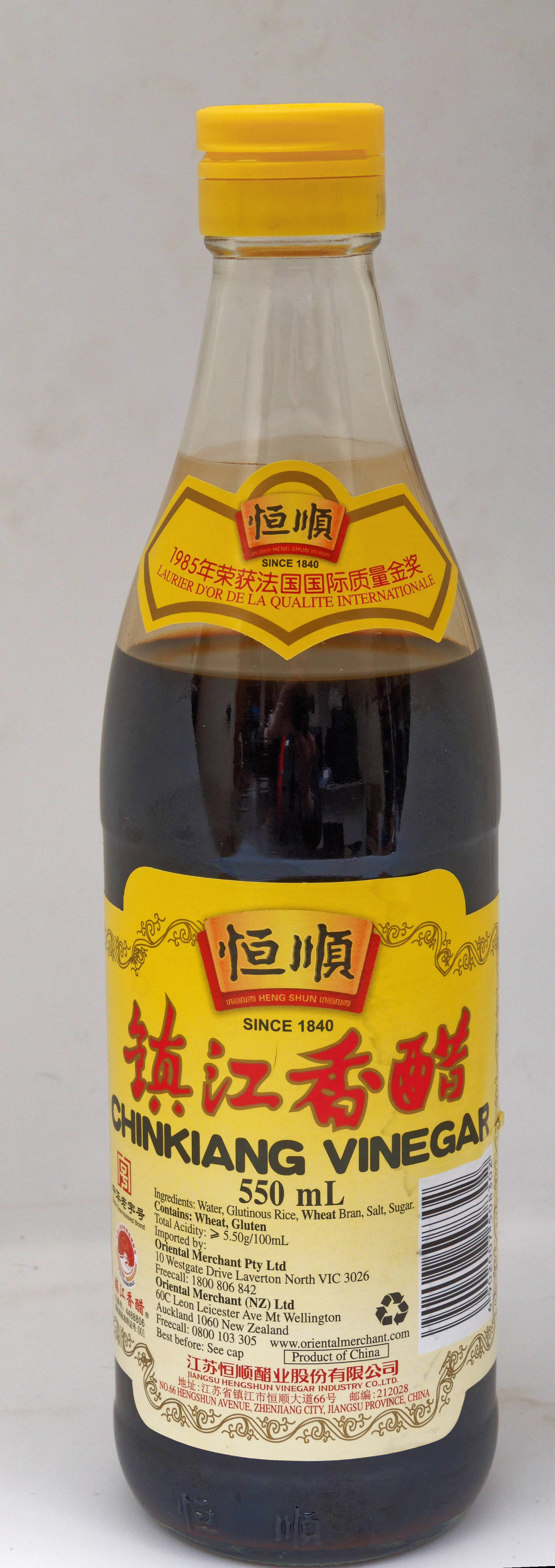
A bottle of Chinkiang vinegar

== History ==
Historically, the fermentation process utilized rice wine lees (pomace), particularly from Shaoxing wine, as the primary substrate. However, due to supply constraints as production scaled, glutinous rice was adopted as the principal feedstock—a transition that was largely finalized by the late 19th century. This shift was notably refined by the local Heng Shun Brewery.

== Geographical indication ==
Physicochemical requirements for Zhenjiang Vinegar
Requirement (per 100 mL)	Mainland China Baseline Standard	European Union PGI Regulation
Total Acidity (as Acetic Acid)	≥ 4.50 g	≥ 5.00 g
Non-volatile Acid (as Lactic Acid)	≥ 1.00 g	≥ 1.00 g
Amino Acid Nitrogen	≥ 0.10 g	≥ 0.10 g
Reducing Sugars (as Glucose)	≥ 2.00 g	(No explicit limit)
Soluble Salt-free Solids	≥ 4.50 g	≥ 4.50 g
Source: National Standard of the P.R.C. (GB/T 18623-2011) and Official Journal of the European Union (2012/C 127/08).

The Mainland China standard defines several grades of the vinegar, with required of 6.00 g for the highest grade.

== Microbiology and chemical profile ==
The fermentation of Zhenjiang Vinegar is driven by Saccharomyces cerevisiae (ethanol stage) followed by a symbiotic culture of Lactic Acid Bacteria (LAB) and Acetic Acid Bacteria (AAB). Acetobacter pasteurianus is the primary species responsible for acetic acid production.

Zhenjiang vinegar is characterized by a significant concentration of glutamic acid among Chinese vinegars. It also contains considerable levels of Tetramethylpyrazine (TMP).

== Maturation and classification ==
The raw vinegar is matured in sealed ceramic urns. Based on the duration of maturation, it is categorized into:

- Fragrant Vinegar (香醋): Aged for a minimum of 180 days.
- Mature Vinegar (陈醋): Aged for a minimum of 365 days.

== See also ==
- Chinese rice vinegars
