= Rice vinegar =

Acidic solution made from fermented rice

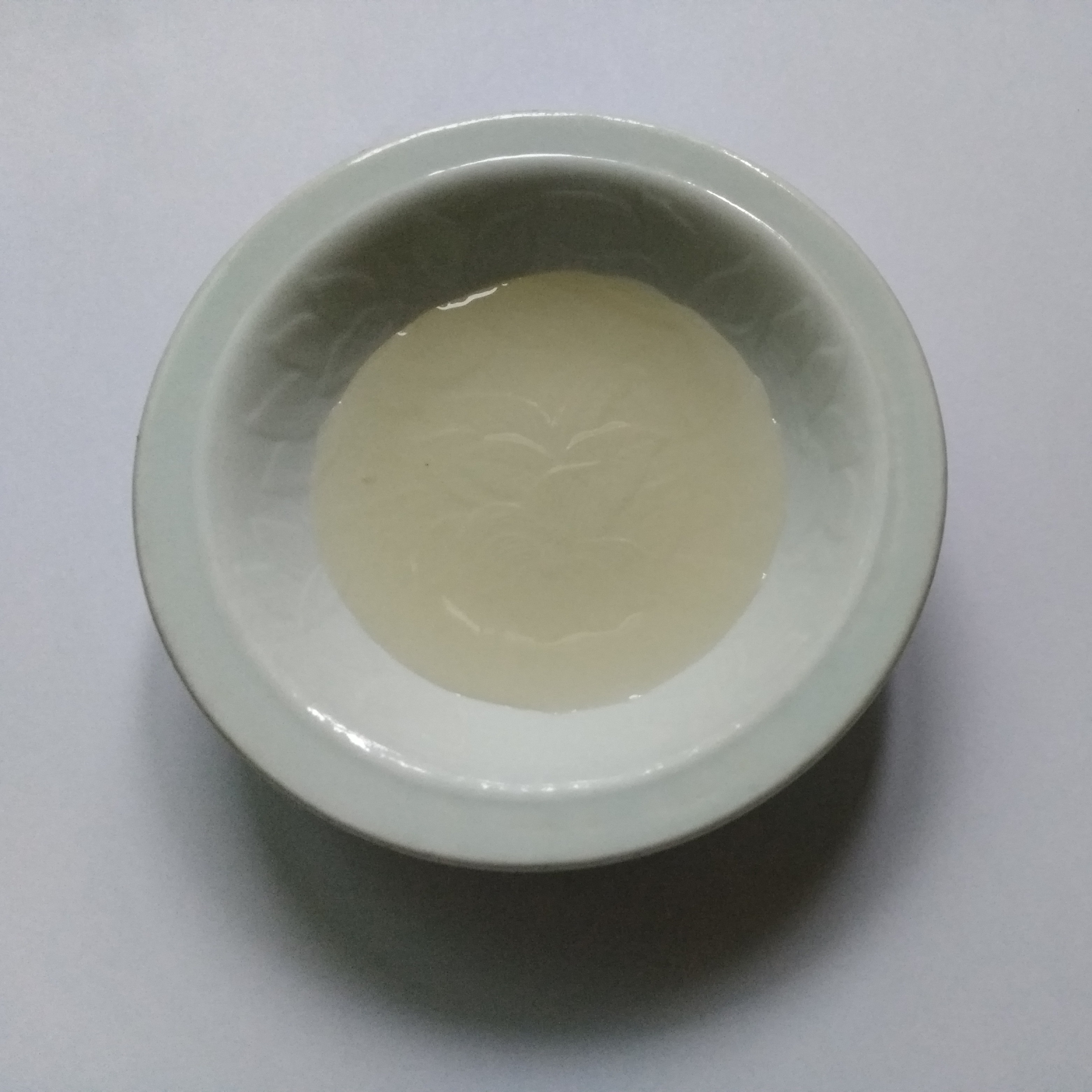
Korean rice vinegar

Rice vinegar is a vinegar made from rice wine in East Asia (China, Japan and Korea), as well as in Vietnam in Southeast Asia. It is used as a seasoning, dressing, and dipping in many dishes, including sushi, jiaozi, and banchans. Some of its variants are also a drink by themselves.

== Chinese ==
Rice vinegar
- Chinese: 醋
Transcriptions
Standard Mandarin
- Hanyu Pinyin: cù
- Wade–Giles: ts'u^{4}
- IPA: [tsʰû]
Yue: Cantonese
- Jyutping: cou^{3}
- IPA: [tsʰɔw˧]
Southern Min
- Hokkien POJ: chhò͘

Chinese rice vinegars are stronger than Japanese ones, and range in color from clear to various shades of red, brown and black and are therefore known as rice wine vinegars. Chinese vinegars are less acidic than their distilled Western counterparts which, for that reason, are not appropriate substitutes for rice vinegars. The majority of the Asian rice vinegars are also milder and sweeter than those typically used in the Western world, with black vinegars as a notable exception.

=== Types ===
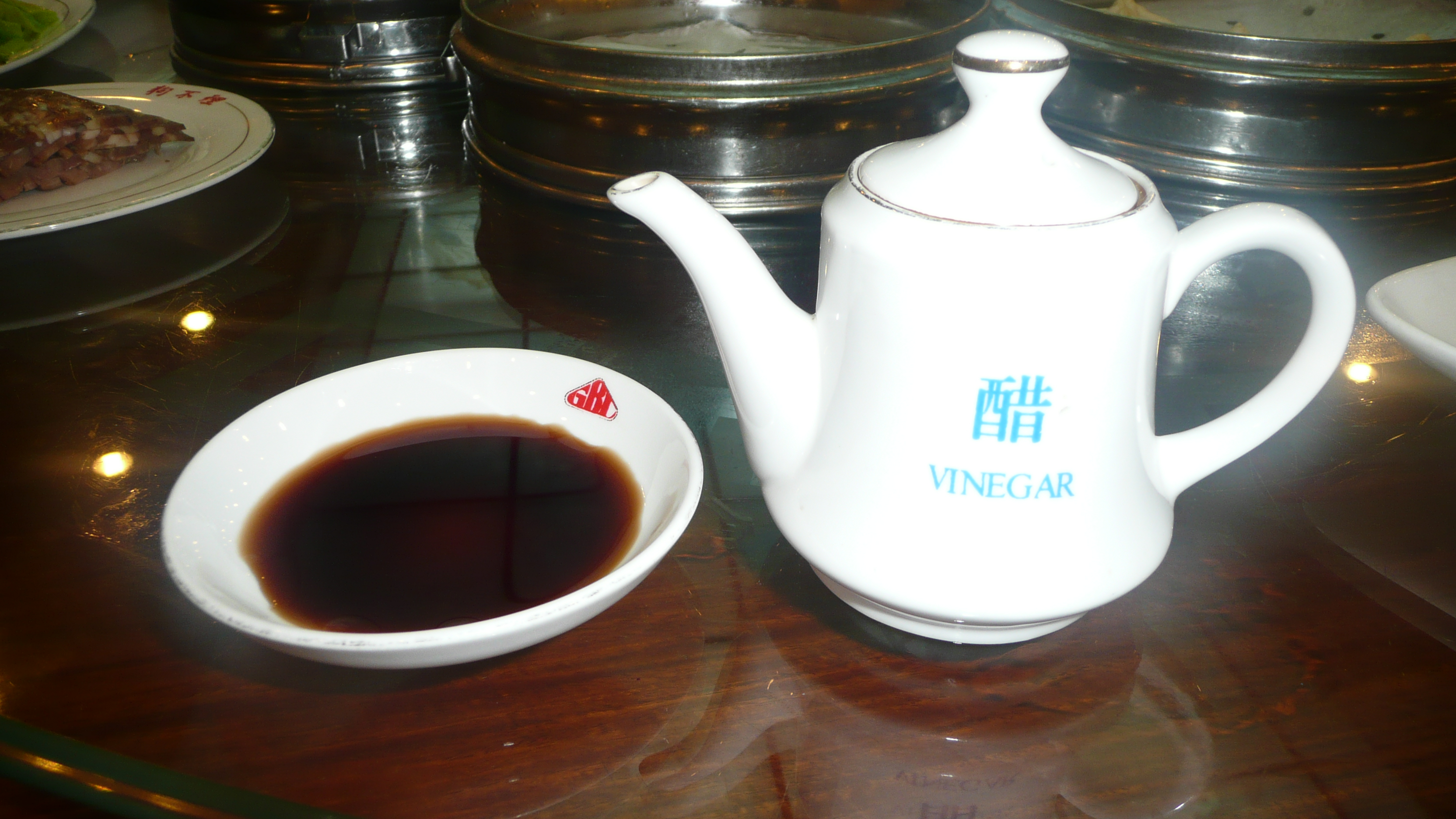
Chinese black vinegar

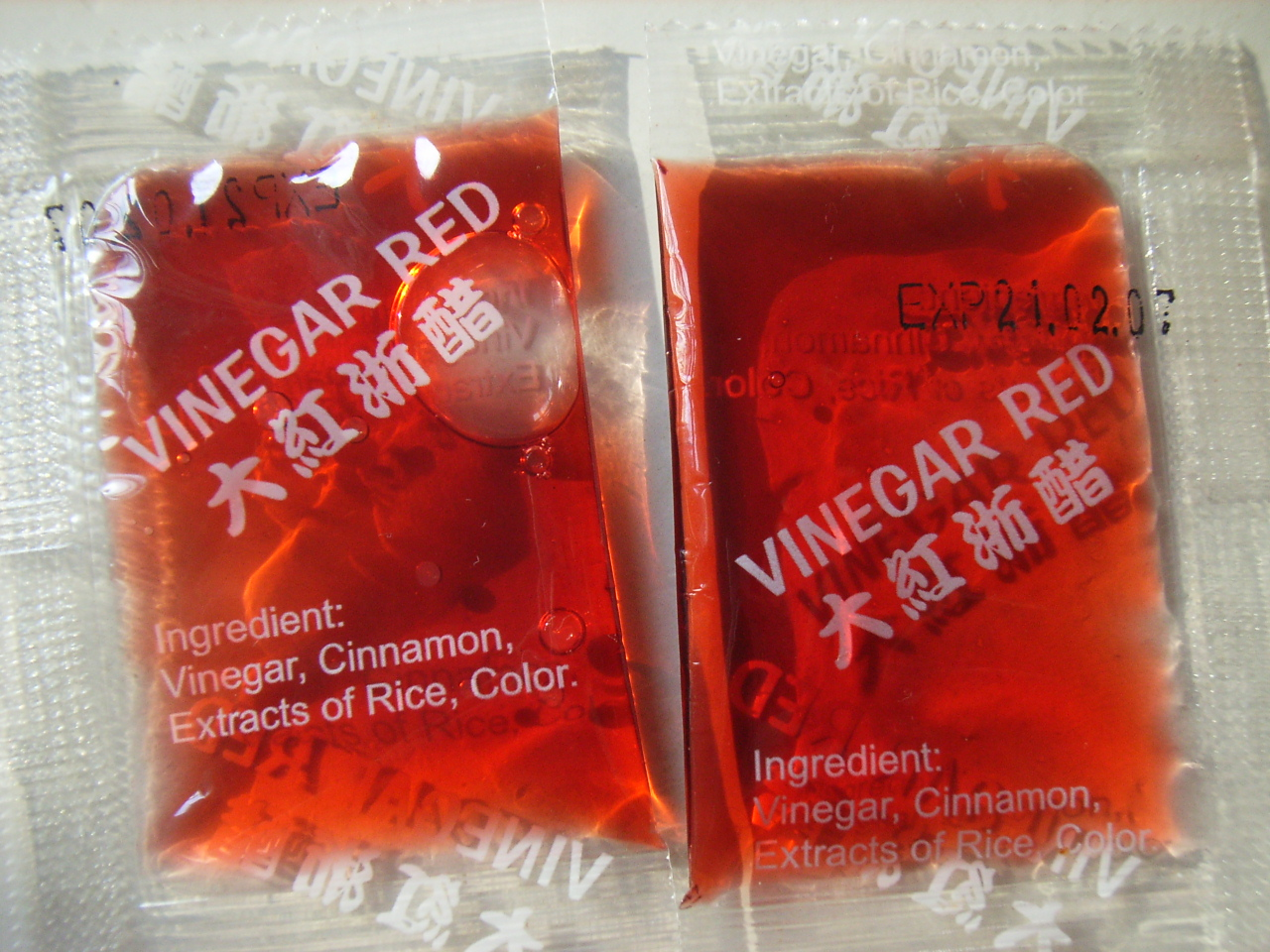
Red rice vinegar

White rice vinegar is a colorless to pale yellow liquid, more acidic than other Chinese vinegars, but still less acidic and milder in flavor than Western ones.

Black vinegar is very popular in southern China. Chinkiang vinegar, which originated in the city of Zhenjiang (Chinese: 镇江香醋; pinyin: Zhènjiāng xiāngcù) in the eastern coastal province of Jiangsu, is considered a great one. Baoning vinegar (保寧醋 or 保宁醋) from Sichuan is another famous example. Typically, black rice vinegar is made with black glutinous rice (also called "sweet rice"), although millet or sorghum may be used instead. It is dark in color, and has a deep, almost smoky flavor. In addition to Zhenjiang, it is also produced in Hong Kong. This is different from the black vinegar popular in north China, which is made from sorghum, peas, barley, bran, and chaff and is most associated with Shanxi province.

Red rice vinegar has a distinctive red color from red yeast rice (红曲米), which is cultivated with the mold Monascus purpureus. This vinegar has a distinctive flavor of its own due to the red mold.

In Chinese cookbooks, ½ tablespoon of Western distilled white vinegar is stated to be equivalent in strength to 1 tablespoon Chinkiang vinegar, and recipes which call for 4 teaspoons of red rice vinegar could be substituted with only 3 teaspoons of white vinegar.

== Japanese ==
Japanese rice vinegar (米酢 komezu, "rice vinegar" or simply 酢 su, "vinegar") is very mild and mellow compared to conventional western vinegars, with only approximately 5% acetic acid content, and ranges in color from colorless to pale yellow. It is made from either rice or sake lees. These are more specifically called yonezu (米酢 よねず) and kasuzu (粕酢 かすず), respectively. These vinegars are used in making sunomono (酢の物, "vinegar dishes"), some tsukemono (漬物, "pickles"), nimono (煮物, "simmered dishes"), as well as in marinades to mitigate the stronger odors of certain fishes and meats.

Seasoned rice vinegar (合わせ酢 awasezu) is made by adding sake, salt and sugar. Additionally, mirin is also sometimes used (but only rarely). Although it can be made at home, prepared awasezu can also be readily bought at supermarkets. Seasoned rice vinegar is added to cooked rice to be used in making sushi. It is also used in salad dressing varieties popular in the west, such as ginger or sesame dressing.

Traditionally, Edomae-style sushi used to be seasoned with a type of red rice vinegar known as akazu (赤酢). This is made using sake lees which would be stored in wooden boxes and aged for up to 20 years. After aging, the now black sake lees are mixed with water to form a mash known as moromi (もろみ/醪). This mash is constantly turned and compressed before undergoing acetic acid fermentation.

A somewhat lighter form of black vinegar called kurozu (黒酢), made from rice, is produced in Japan. It is considered as a healthy drink; its manufacturers claim that it contains high concentrations of amino acids. Recent scientific research on kurozu has revealed its anti-cancer properties in vivo on rats and in vitro on human cancer cells.

== Korean ==
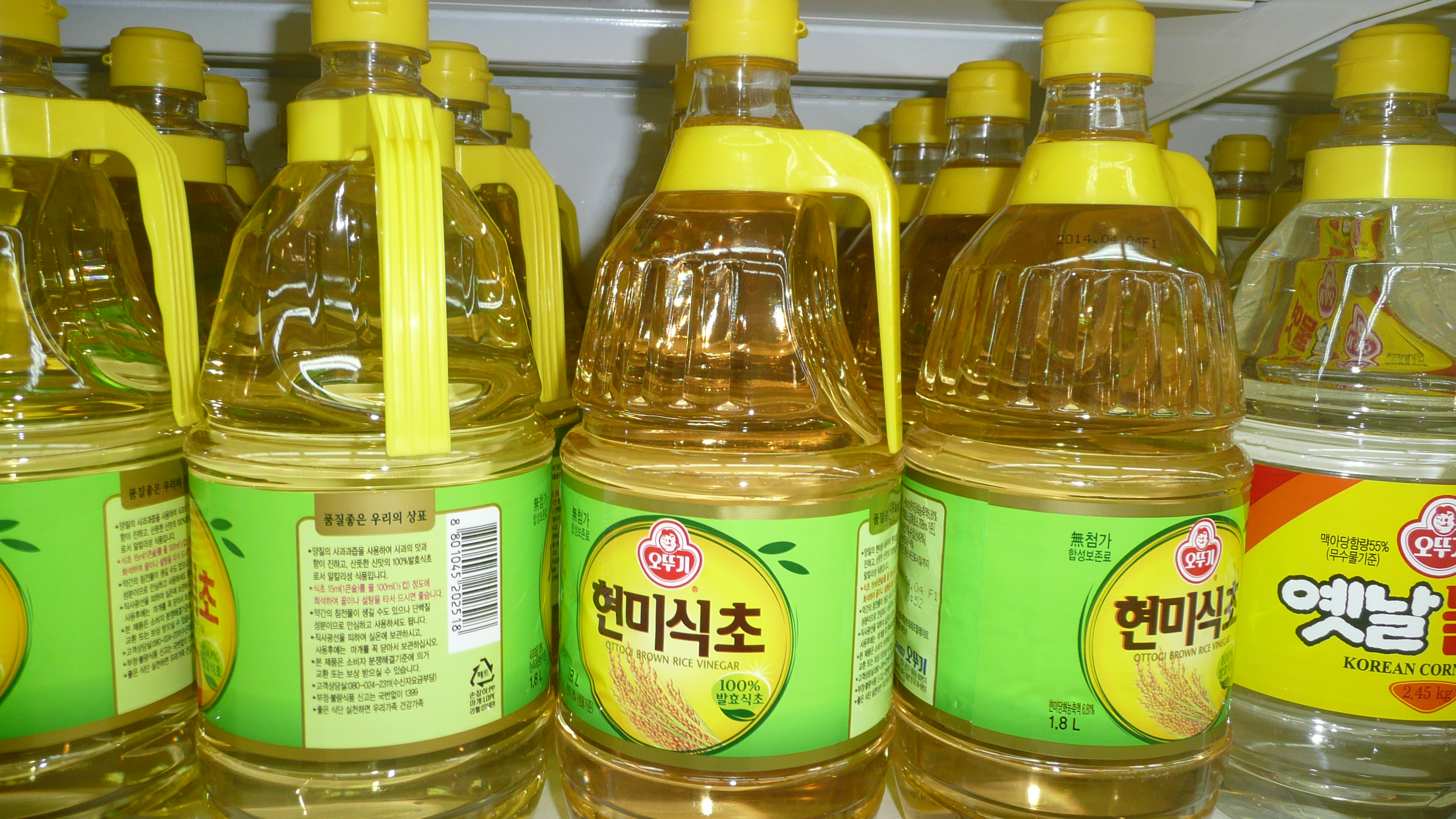
Hyeonmi-sikcho (brown rice vinegar)

In Korean cuisine, ssal-sikcho (쌀식초; "rice vinegar") made with either white or brown rice. Glutinous rice may also be used. Rice is mixed with nuruk (fermentation starter). Alternatively, rice wine lees can be used to make rice vinegar, in which case the final product is often called makgeolli-sikcho (rice wine vinegar). Two rice vinegar varieties, each from North Gyeongsang Province and South Chungcheong Province, are included in the Ark of Taste catalogue of heritage foods.

== Vietnamese ==
Rice vinegar is called dấm gạo or giấm gạo in Vietnamese. One variation of Vietnamese rice vinegar is the spicy and sour giấm bỗng made from nếp cái hoa vàng rice. The most notable place of origin of this kind of vinegar is Vân village, Vân Hà commune, Việt Yên district, Bắc Giang province. Giấm bỗng is an ingredient of vịt om giấm bổng, bún riêu, and bún ốc.

Another rice vinegar is the lightly sour hèm, used in ốc bươu hấp hèm and gà hấp hèm which is a specialty of Hóc Môn district, Ho Chi Minh City. The mẻ rice vinegar, which is strongly sour, is used in trâu luộc mẻ—-a speciality of Cần Thơ city.
