= Oxymel =

Mixture of honey and vinegar, used as a medicine

Oxymel (from Latin 'acid and honey', from Ancient Greek ὀξύς 'acid' and μέλι 'honey') is a mixture of honey and vinegar, historically used as a medicine.

Its name is often found in Renaissance (and later) pharmacopoeiae in Late Latin form as either a countable or uncountable noun. As a countable noun, it is spelled variously as (singular) oxymellus and oxymellis, and plural oxymeli and oxymelli.

== Etymology and recipe ==
Cato the Elder describes it thus:

Oxymelli. Fit vinum ex aceto & melle quod oxymel vocaverunt voce Graecanica. Nam oξ(?) dicitur Graecis acetu & μίλ mel. Fit autem oxymel hoc modo. Mellis decem librae cum aceti heminis quinque, haec decies subserve faciunt atque ita sinunt inveterare. Themison summus autor damnavit oxymel & hydromel. Est autem hydromel vinum ex aquae & melle confectum, unde & nome. Celebrant autores ex omphacomel, quod fit ex uvae semiacerbae succo & melle fortiter trite unde & nome: Graec enim όμφας dicitur uvae acerbae, & όμφαφκας vocant uvas & fructus immaturus. Hinc omphalicium oleum dictum, quod ex olivis acerbis quas δίγρας(?) vocant, fit: & omphacium ex uva, quod vulgo agreste nominitant.

— Cato, reproduced by Columella, De Re Rustica

A wine made from vinegar and honey, which in Greece was called oxymel, (from Ancient Greek oξύ 'acetu' and μίλ 'mel', hence [Latin] "oxymel"). It is made thus. Ten libras of honey with five heminas of vinegar, which will be subsumed. Themison confused oxymel and hydromel. But hydromel wine is made from water and honey, hence the name. Its name recalls the creation of omphacomel, which is made from semi-dry [i.e. sharp] grapes and sweet honey, hence the name, from Ancient Greek όμφας 'uvae acerbae, Sour grapes' and όμφαφκας 'fructus immaturus, unripe fruit'. Hence what is called omphalicium oleum ["omphalic oil"], from sour olives which in Greek is called δίγρας(?), and omphacium from grapes, commonly called agreste.

== Use ==
In the 1593 work Enchiridion chirurgicum, oxymel was recommended as part of a treatment for ophthalmia.

Because Latin was (and is) still used widely in medical prescriptions, it was still known by this name in Victorian times:

Form. 206. Haustus cum Plumbi Acetate

℞: Plumbi Acetatis, gr. j. Solve in Aquae Rosae, ℥j.; et adde Oxymellis Simplicis, ʒj.; Tinct. Opii, ♏︎v.; Tinct. Digitalis, ♏︎x. Fiat Haustus, quartis vel sextis horis sumendus.

— James Copland, A Dictionary of Practical Medicine (1855)

Formula 206. Drink with lead(II) acetate

Prescription: Lead acetate one grain. Dissolve in rose water, one ounce; and add undiluted oxymel, one drachm; tincture of opium, five minims; tincture of digitalis, ten minims. To be taken every four to six hours.

== Modern use ==
Clinical trials involving oxymel have investigated its impacts on chronic medical conditions including obesity although low sample sizes and lack of data mean that more research is needed before drawing conclusions.

== See also ==
- Sekanjabin
- Switchel
