= Mother of vinegar =

Biofilm formed on fermenting alcoholic liquids

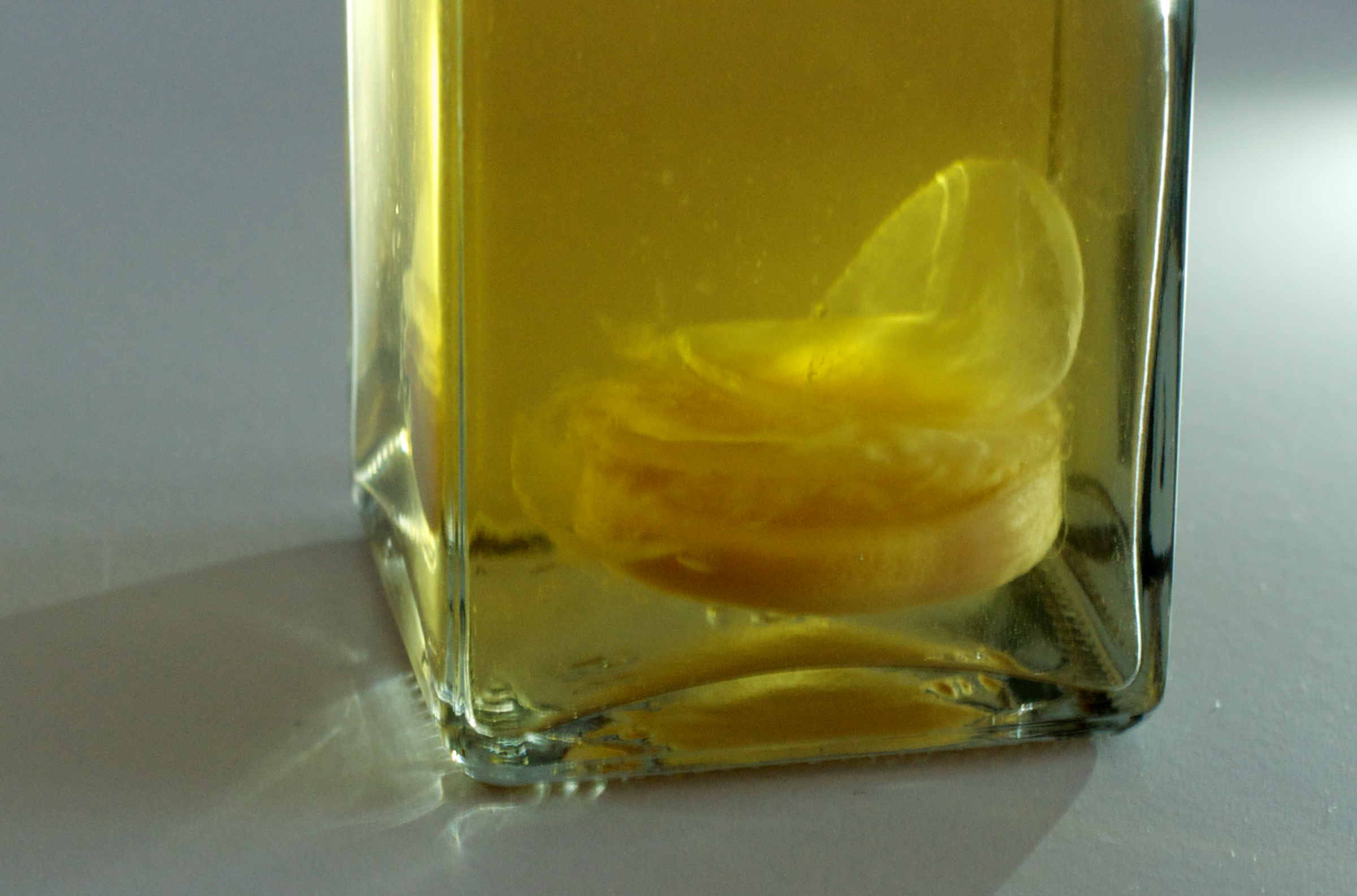
Mother of vinegar in a bottle

Mother of vinegar is a biofilm composed of a form of cellulose, yeast, and bacteria that sometimes develops on fermenting alcoholic liquids during the process that turns alcohol into acetic acid with the help of oxygen from the air and acetic acid bacteria (AAB). It is similar to the symbiotic culture of bacteria and yeast (SCOBY) mostly known from production of kombucha, but develops to a much lesser extent due to lesser availability of yeast, which is often no longer present in wine/cider at this stage, and a different population of bacteria. Mother of vinegar is often added to wine, cider, or other alcoholic liquids to produce vinegar at home, although only the bacteria is required, but historically has also been used in large scale production.

== Discovery ==
Hermann Boerhaave was one of the first scientists to study vinegar. In the early 1700s, he showed the importance of the mother of vinegar in the acetification process, and how having an increased oxidation surface allowed for better vinegar production. He called the mother a "vegetal substance" or "flower."

In 1822, South African botanist, Christian Hendrik Persoon named the mother of vinegar Mycoderma, which he believed was a fungus. He attributed the vinegar production to the Mycoderma, since it formed on the surface of wine when it has been left open to air.

In 1861, Louis Pasteur made the conclusion that vinegar is made by a "plant" that belonged to the group Mycoderma, and not made purely by chemical oxidation of ethanol. He named the plant Mycoderma aceti. Mycoderma aceti, is a Neo-Latin expression, from the Greek μύκης ("fungus") plus δέρμα ("skin"), and the Latin aceti ("of the acid").

Martinus Willem Beijerinck, who was a founder of modern microbiology, identified acetic acid bacteria in the mother of vinegar. He named the bacteria Acetobacter aceti in 1898. In 1935, Toshinobu Asai, a Japanese microbiologist, discovered a new genus of bacteria in the mother of vinegar, Gluconobacter. After this discovery, 12 genera and 59 species of bacteria were found to compose the AAB found in mother of vinegar.

== Description ==
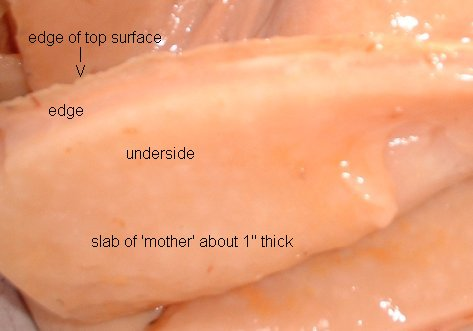
Slab of mother of vinegar taken from a fermentation tank

Mother of Vinegar forms a grayish veil which can be fine or more solid depending on the conditions. The veil forms in conditions that include nutrients like proteins that are found in wine, limited acidity, and ideal concentrations of alcohol.

=== Bacteria ===
The veil is nontoxic and is composed of cellulose and AAB. The raw materials and other manufacturing features determine what genus the bacteria that composes the AAB is from. PCR fingerprinting revealed that Acetobacter genus was the most abundant in mother of vinegar resulting from apples, while Komagataeibacter genus was most dominant in mother of vinegar resulting from grapes. Mother of vinegar from apples had A. okinawenis as the most abundant species of bacteria. Grape vinegar and the mother had K. europaeus as the most dominant bacterial species.

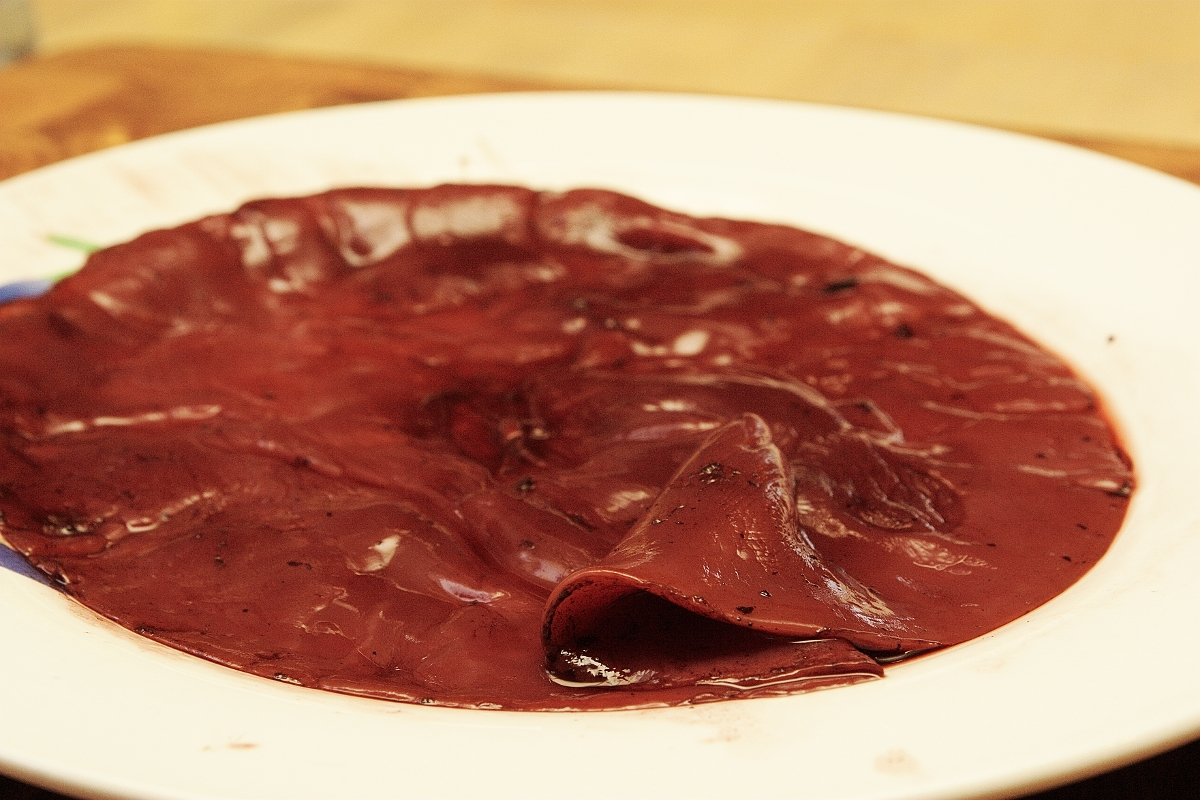
Mother of vinegar that is composed of Acetobacter

There are also many other bacterial genera that are in mother of vinegar. Polymerase Chain Reaction Denaturing Gradient Gel Electrophoresis (PCR-DGGE) was used to detect the bacterial components and genera in vinegar. These groups include: Acetobacter, Acidomonas, Ameyamaea, Asaia, Gluconacetobacter, Gluconobacter, Granulibacter, Komagataeibacter, Kozakia, Neoasaia, Saccharibacter, Swaminathania, and Tanticharoenia. These bacteria are normally gram-negative or gram-variable and have polar flagella. They also need an aerobic environment to grow and prefer an environment with a pH of 5–6.5 but can survive in pH of 3–4. They are non-spore forming bacteria. These bacteria are difficult to find in spontaneous fermentation. This is because they are in competition with other microbial groups during the time the mother of vinegar is in the viable but not culturable (VBNC) state. The genera, Gluconacetobacter and Komagataeibacter produce high levels of bacterial cellulose, which is what mother of vinegar is composed of.

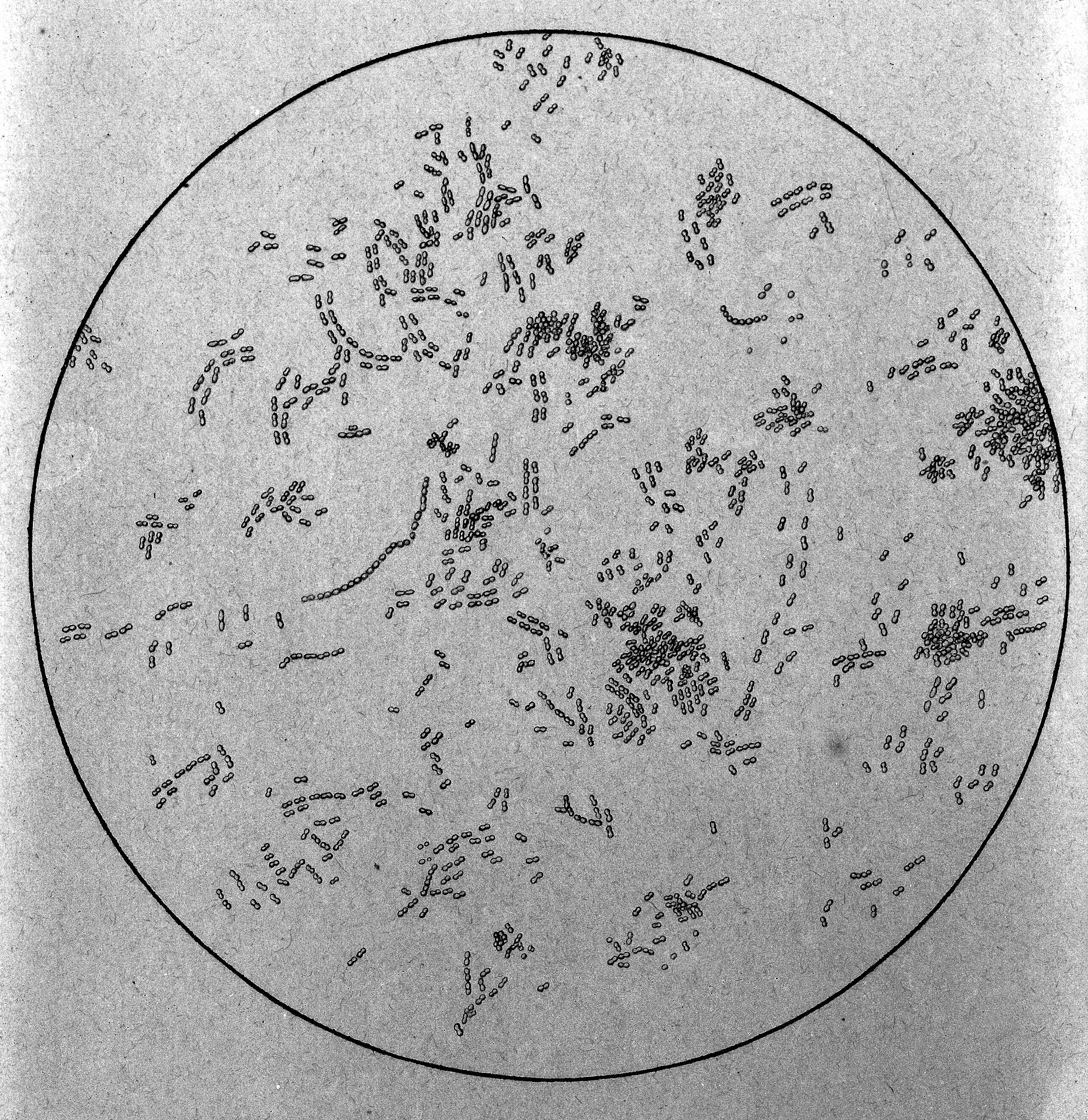
Bacterial culture of mother of vinegar

The amount of Gluconacetobacter and Acetobacter in the mother of vinegar is associated with the concentration of acetic acid in the vinegar. Vinegars with a concentration of acetic acid greater than 6% contained more Gluconacetobacter, while those with a concentration of less than 6% typically see Acetobacter present. However, on an industrial scale, Acetobacter was seen in acetic acid concentrations of 11.5–12%.

Lactic acid bacteria are also present in mother of vinegar to aid in the breakdown of carbohydrates in the alcohol fermentation process. Lactic acid bacteria create lactic acid, which results in a pH decrease in the final vinegar product. In Shanxi aged vinegar, there were seven species of three different bacterial genera present in its mother of vinegar. These species include, Limosilactobacillus fermentum (formerly Lactobacillus fermentum), Weissella confusa, Lentilactobacillus buchneri (aka Lactobacillus buchneri), Lactiplantibacillus plantarum (aka Lactobacillus plantarum), Lacticaseibacillus casei (formerly Lactobacillus casei), Pediococcus acidilactici, and P. pentosaceus. These bacteria are all gram-positive, long rod-shaped, or elliptical shaped. There were very few cocci shaped bacteria present.

=== Yeast ===
Mother of vinegar is also composed of yeasts that ferment the sugars in the wine, cider, or other alcoholic liquids into ethanol. In the making of Shanxi mature vinegar, the Daqu alcoholic fermentation starter mainly includes S. cerevisae, P. anomala, and Candida spp. As fermentation proceeds, S. cerevisae quickly becomes dominant for its tolerance to ethanol. Hence the acetic acid fermentation starts with relative few species of yeasts, mainly S. cerevisae. (The actual mother of vinegar used in the making of Shanxi mature vinegar, Pei, is not analyzed in this study.)

== Applications ==
Mother of vinegar is used as an aid in the production of vinegar. There are some drawbacks. If the mother of vinegar does not penetrate the mass of the vinegar, then it disrupts the vinegar making process. This is because the mycoderms consume the oxygen in the wine, breaking it down. Having a thick layer of mother of vinegar can also destroy the odorant compounds in vinegar. A way to avoid these side effects is to only use the surface veil of mother of vinegar.

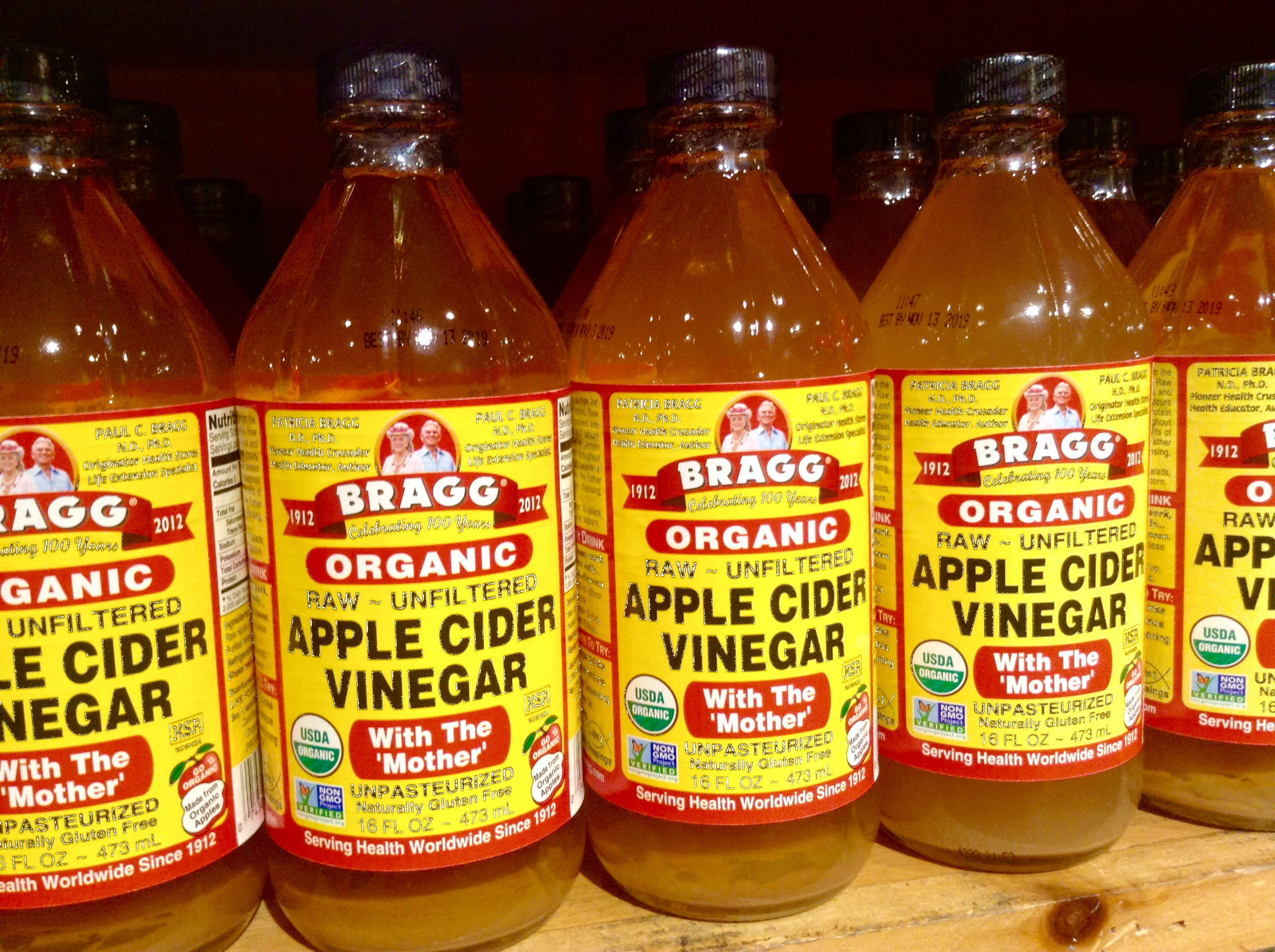
Store-bought vinegar with mother of vinegar at the bottom

Vinegar can be made on a mass scale. A system that utilizes mother of vinegar is called Orleans or French. It was named this since many wines were sold to vinegar brewers at Orleans, which is a port on the Loire, in France. The system grows mother of vinegar on a big surface. The mother is fed with organic liquids that are rich in phosphates and nitrogen. The mother is then placed on top of the wine in big shallow vats. The vat is then covered with another vat or just a cover. The mother acetifies the wine into vinegar.

Mother of vinegar is also used in the traditional production of balsamic vinegar. Balsamic vinegar is created by cooking down grape juice to create a concentrate. The concentrate is poured into a demijohn and is left to sit throughout the winter. In the spring, the concentrate is transferred to a wooden barrel. By summer, mother of vinegar is used to start the vinegar fermentation. The concentrate and mother are then separated into different barrels of varying wood types. The vinegar is created over the course of 13 years.

Mother of vinegar can also form in store-bought vinegar if there is some residual sugar, leftover yeast and bacteria and/or alcohol contained in the vinegar. This is more common in unpasteurized vinegar, since the pasteurization might not stabilize the process completely. While not necessarily appetizing in appearance, mother of vinegar is completely harmless and the surrounding vinegar does not have to be discarded because of it. It can be filtered out using a coffee filter, used to start a bottle of vinegar, or simply ignored.

== Mother of kombucha ==
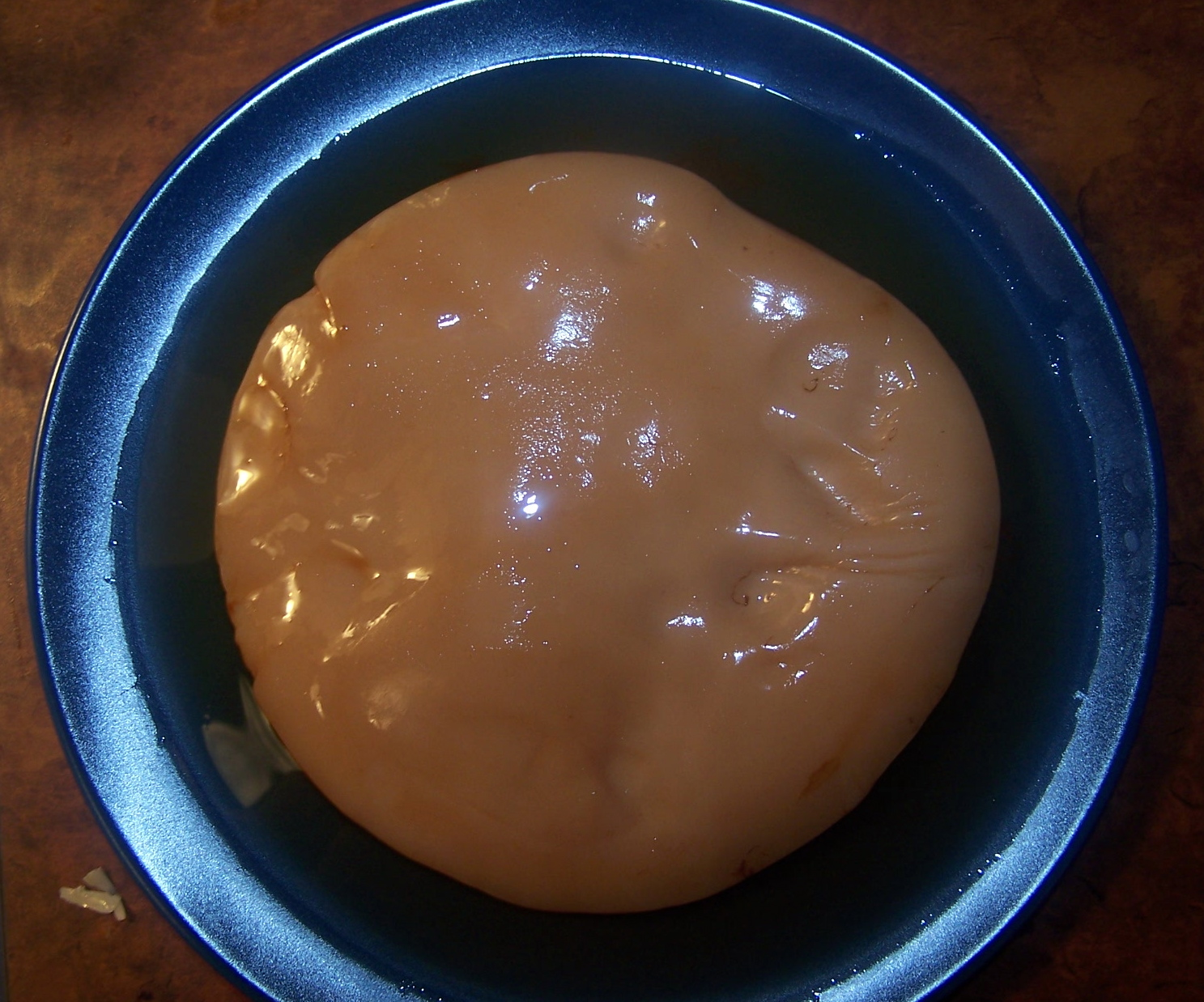
Kombucha mother

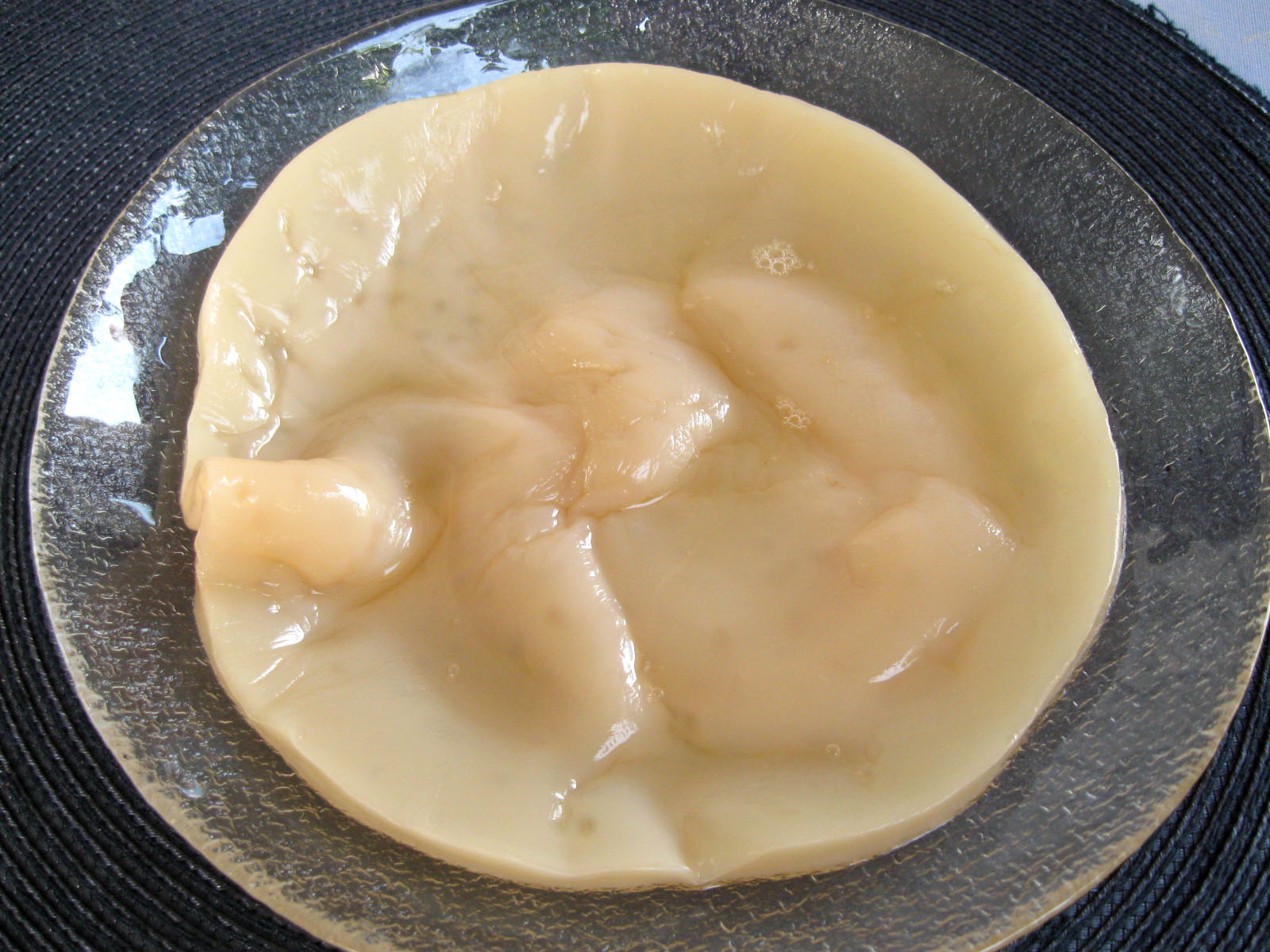
Mother of vinegar taken from apple cider vinegar

Mother of vinegar and mother of kombucha share many similarities, but they are different. Kombucha mother is created from the fermentation of tea, while mother of vinegar is created from the fermentation of wine, cider, or other alcoholic beverages. The fermentation process of tea creates SCOBY. The SCOBY creates a bacterial cellulose film, like that seen in mother of vinegar. The bacteria also oxidizes the alcohol to create acetic acid. The main bacterial genus involved in the mother of kombucha is Acetobacter, which is also a main genus in mother of vinegar. Kombucha mother also has the bacteria genus Gluconobacter, which is found in some vinegar types. Both vinegar and kombucha mothers contain yeast, which ferments sugars to ethanol. After the fermentation process, the AAB oxidizes the ethanol into acetic acid.

The main difference between mother of vinegar and mother of kombucha is the acetic acid tolerance. Vinegar has a higher acetic acid concentration than kombucha, therefore the species in mother of vinegar needs to tolerate higher levels of acetic acid. Due to the differences in the compositions of the mothers, mother of vinegar cannot be used to produce kombucha due to it not being derived from tea and its bacteria having different characteristics.

== See also ==
- Acetobacter – Genus of bacteria
- Fulvic acid – Major component of natural organic matter
- Pellicle (cooking) – Coating on food
- SCOBY – Symbiotic culture of bacteria and yeast
- Turbatrix aceti – Species of roundworm - vinegar eels
- Kombucha – Fermented tea beverage
- Bacterial cellulose – Organic compound
