= SCOBY =

Symbiotic culture of bacteria and yeast

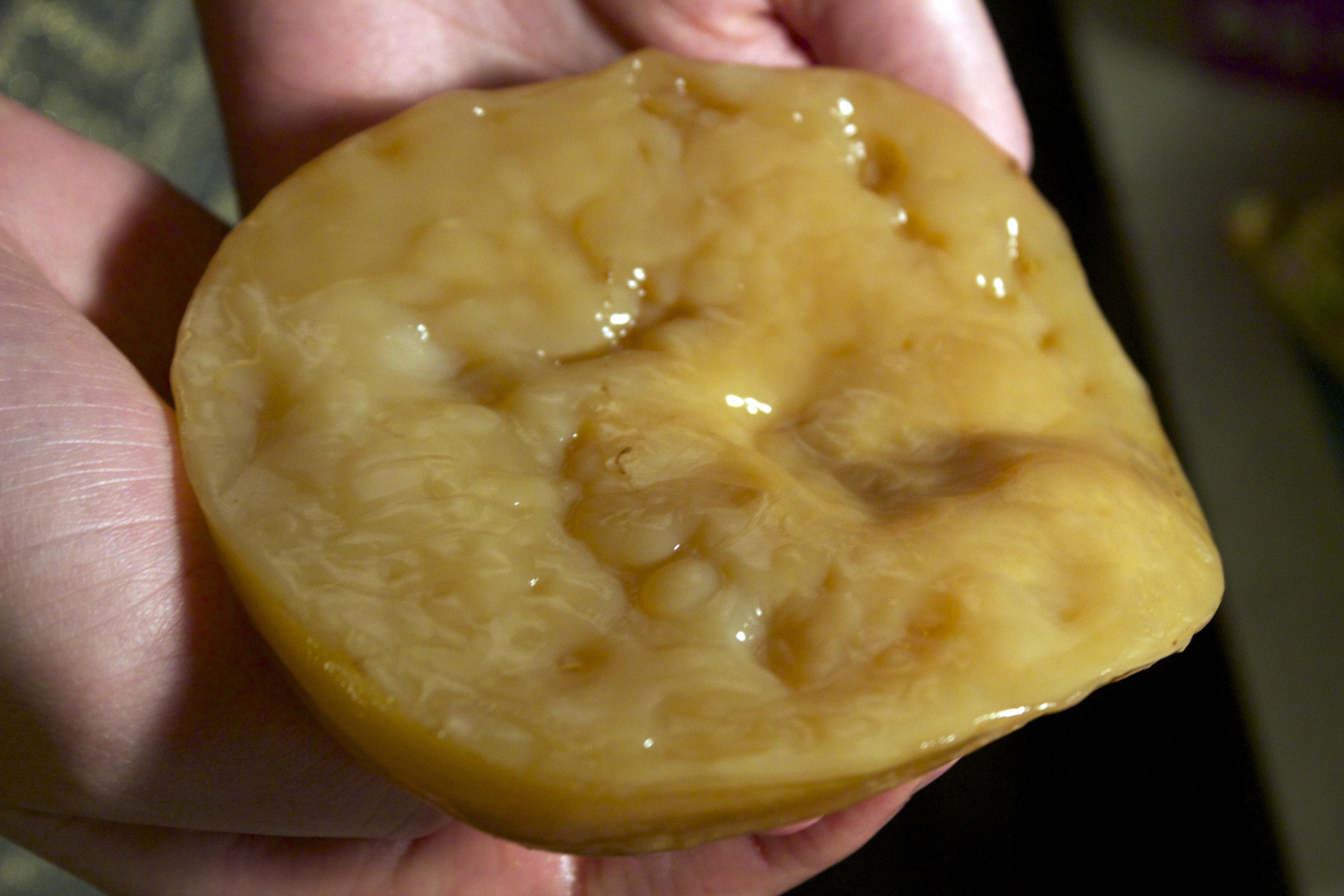
A SCOBY pellicle produced by kombucha brewing

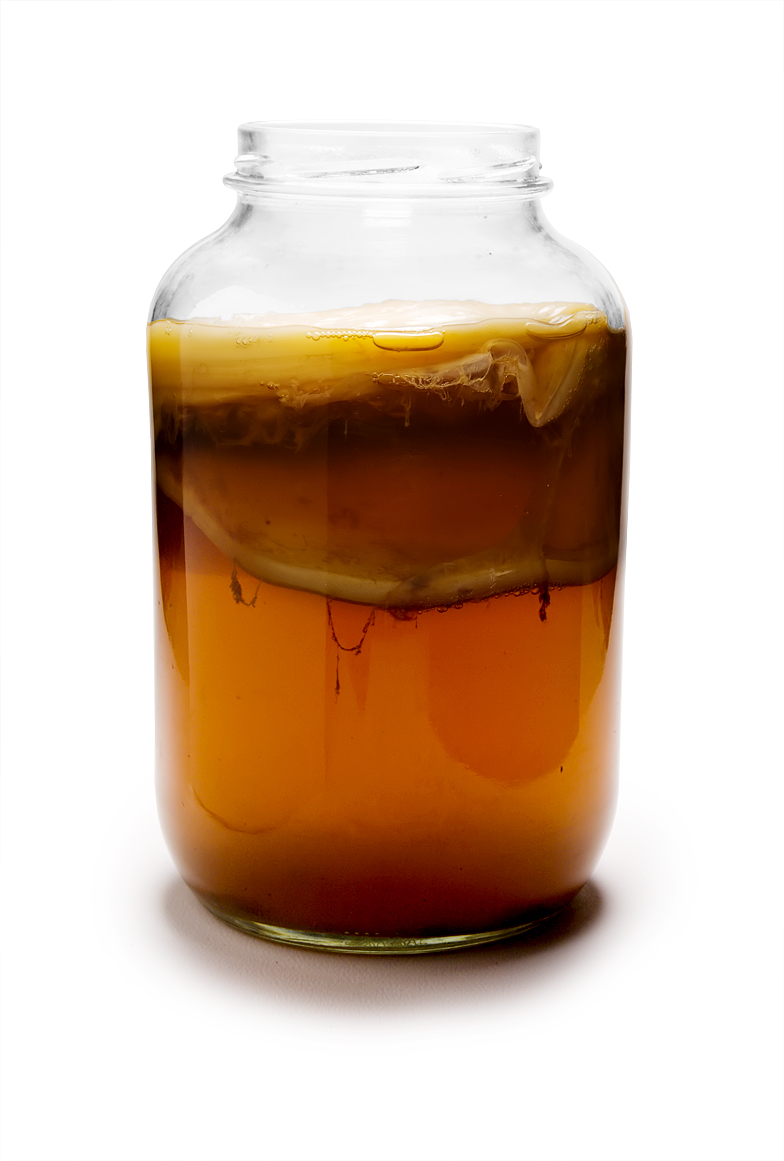
Kombucha co-culture with both liquid culture and SCOBY pellicle

A symbiotic culture of bacteria and yeast (SCOBY) is a culinary symbiotic fermentation culture (starter) consisting of lactic acid bacteria (LAB), acetic acid bacteria (AAB), and yeast which arises in the preparation of sour foods and beverages such as kombucha. Beer and wine also undergo fermentation with yeast, but the LAB and AAB components unique to the SCOBY are usually viewed as a source of spoilage rather than a desired addition. Both LAB and AAB enter on the surface of barley and malt in beer fermentation and grapes in wine fermentation; LAB lowers the pH of the beer or wine while AAB takes the ethanol produced from the yeast and oxidizes it further into vinegar, resulting in a sour taste and smell. AAB are also responsible for the formation of the cellulose SCOBY.

SCOBY most accurately refers to the culture of bacteria and yeast suspended in the fermentation media, but it also is commonly used to refer to the gelatinous biofilm or microbial mat found floating at the container's air–liquid interface. This bacterial cellulose mat is referred to as a pellicle, and consists of a dense cellulose matrix with embedded bacteria and yeast cultures. SCOBY pellicles, like other fermentation starters, can serve the purpose of continuing the fermentation process into a new vessel and reproducing the desired product. This is done by introducing some of the previous culture to new, unfermented media. Typically, both the pellicle and a portion of the previously fermented fluid will be introduced, as this provides a higher quantity of microbes, and contributes to quickly lowering the pH of the mixture, which is essential for food safety. Microbial density can vary greatly within the biofilm due to fermentation conditions, leading to possible variations in the end product.

== Co-culture composition and conditions ==
Based on the desired product of the SCOBY, different species of bacteria and yeast are used. Such cultures generally include aerobic, gram negative AAB species such as Acetobacter, Gluconobacter and Komagataeibacter, aerobic, gram positive LAB such as Lactobacillus, as well as various yeasts such as Saccharomyces and Zygosaccharomyces. Strains are pre-screened for viability under compatible conditions, increased yield of desired product, and indisposition to compete; once chosen, various culture conditions are modified for optimal growth and productivity.

For kombucha SCOBYs, the first step is yeast fermentation of sugars such as glucose from black or green tea into ethanol and carbon dioxide. Zygosaccharomyces is reported to be involved in 84.1% of all kombucha SCOBY fermentation processes due to its improved stability in high sugar and halophilic conditions, while Saccharomyces is predominantly used for its efficient fermentation rates and resistance to high temperature and alcohol content. Different variations of yeast can also be added as either a supplemental means to introduce different flavors and aromas or ensure reaction completion by utilizing different niches. While these niches vary yeast to yeast, certain fermentation conditions remain consistent. Such conditions include but are not limited to high substrate concentration, sufficient oxygen levels, temperatures of 20–30 °C (68–86 °F), and a pH between 4–4.5.

The second step in the formation of SCOBY is the introduction of different bacteria into the liquid culture to convert the ethanol product of fermentation into organic acids such as acetic acid, which is a type of ethanol metabolism (lactic acid bacteria may also be added, producing lactic acid from lactic acid fermentation on sugars). A possible byproduct of this reaction is cellulose, which serves as the foundation for the SCOBY biofilm. Like yeasts, the species of bacteria chosen as well as culture conditions directly affect both the characteristics of the liquid kombucha product as well as the composition and morphology of the SCOBY pellicle. While there are many species that have the mechanisms necessary to form cellulose such as Acetobacter and Komagataeibacter, Gluconaceobacter are one of the most populous used, residing in 86–99% of both liquid and biofilm cultures. The necessary culturing conditions of these bacteria are similar to that of yeasts, but require more oxygen due to their aerobic nature in oxidizing ethanol to form organic acids.

Once the internal conditions of the co-culture are in place, the symbiotic mixture is left to ferment. Certain studies have claimed optimal fermentation time to be 10 days, but the duration can be modified to change the contents of the yield; greater fermentation times correlate with higher levels of organic acids and other amino acids, which can attribute to the sour undertones of some Kombucha. Despite controls in place, the species comprising the mixed cultures can still initiate metabolic change preparation to preparation with the slightest change in co-culture conditions and alter product qualities such as sugar concentration, so adequate monitoring is necessary when running in a continuous mode or reusing a starter culture.

== Biofilm characteristics ==
The formation of the cellulose pellicle at the surface of the broth yields a product with unique characteristics that both bacteria and consumers find advantageous. Upon inoculation into the culture, bacteria such as Acetobacter immediately begin pulling glucose molecules together outside of the cell and joining them via β(1-4) linkages to form long, slender structures extending from their cell membranes called fibrils. The nanocellulose composing these fibrils demonstrates great strength and stability while still allowing hydrophilic interactions and biocompatibility, making it a great resource for the culture to use. A variety of inter and intramolecular bonding events join numerous fibrils together into the final, much larger structures known as microfibrils; because of the integrity of the microfibrils and the organized, linear nature of cellulose bonds, the resulting biofilm can also be referred to as a matrix or mat. This biofilm is a natural defense mechanism for the co-culture, and can withstand extreme conditions such as temperature and UV radiation. Two additional characteristics of the nanofibril cellulose SCOBY—its high purity and crystallinity—are currently a target in biomedical research in the formation of biocompatible tissue scaffolds, cardiovascular components such as blood vessels, bone grafts, and connective tissue replacements. The nanocellulose fibrils can also be extracted via acid hydrolysis and used in the food packaging, clothing, and wastewater treatment industries.

The thickness of a kombucha SCOBY is contingent on all brewing conditions, but one study reported an average thickness of two to five millimeters. SCOBYs can be divided to start multiple cultures or dehydrated to create a jerky-like food. Some vendors sell dehydrated pellicles as a shelf-stable alternative to fresh starter, but thermal dehydration may cause damage to the culture. Once removed, the culture will begin to regenerate a new pellicle known informally as a "baby SCOBY." This process can be repeated multiple times for months at a time.

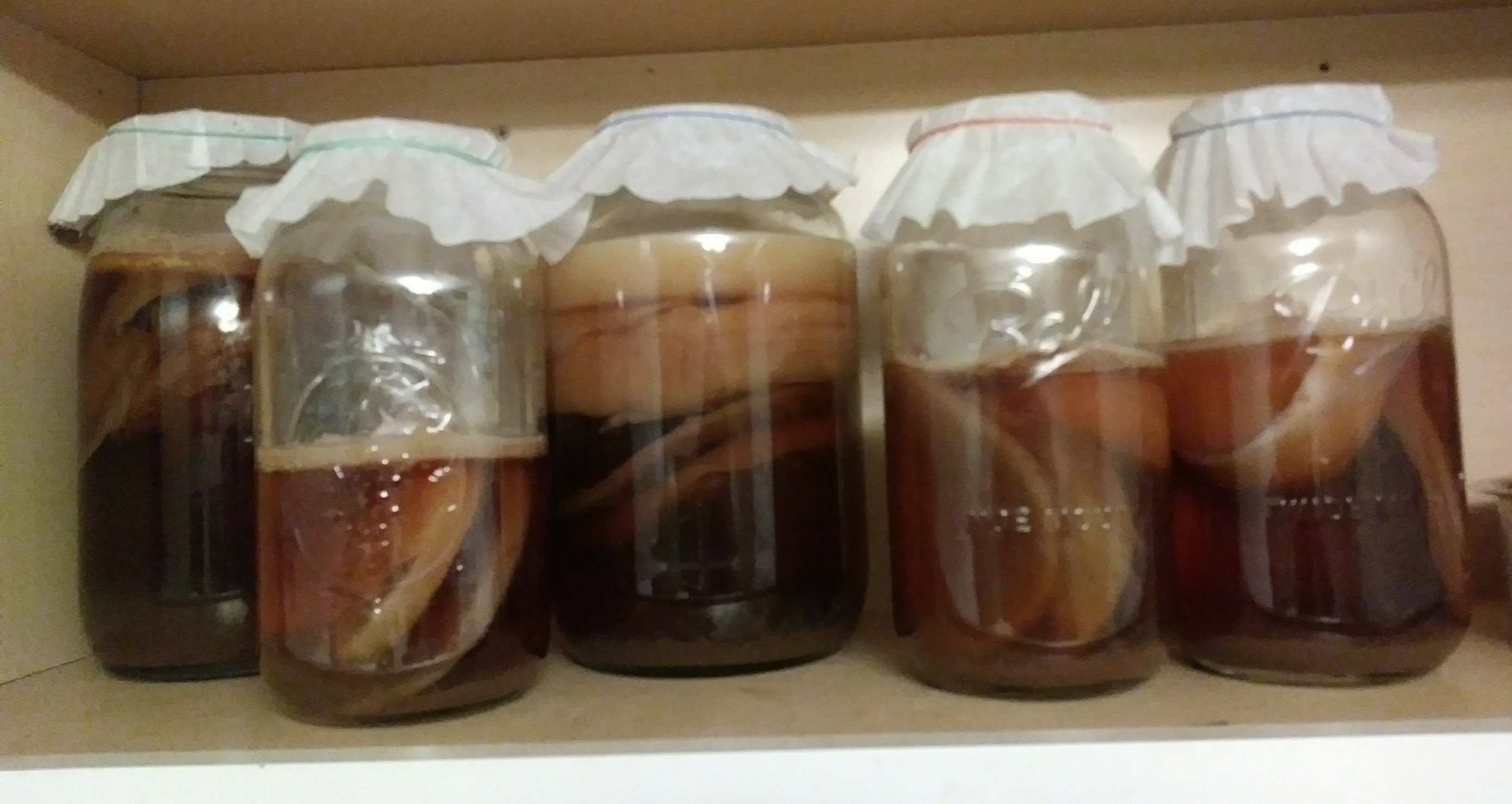
A group of kombucha SCOBYs

== Use in food production ==
In addition to kombucha, there are a variety of other foods and beverages which require a similar "symbiotic culture" in their production such as:

- Ginger beer
- Jun, a drink similar to kombucha
- Kefir
- Sourdough bread, which uses starters based on wild yeasts
- Tibicos
- Vinegar, the production of which requires a mother of vinegar
- Lambic

Kvass, borș, rejuvelac, brottrunk, podpiwek and boza are fermented drinks that do not use a SCOBY as a starter; by contrast, their starter is liquid.

== Other uses ==
Queensland University of Technology and the State Library of Queensland have been using kombucha SCOBY to produce a workable bio-textile, considered a type of vegan leather.

A small international team of material and computer engineers from the UK, Italy and Greece has tested the possibility of using kombucha SCOBY to produce electronic circuit boards.

SCOBY has also been used by various visual artists working in a variety of disciplines. Artists have been known to dry out the material for sculpture purposes, record sounds made whilst the SCOBY ferments, release the scent and use its unique visual appearance for light effects. A SCOBY installation appeared at one of Britain's biggest light shows, Leeds Light Night in 2026.

== See also ==
- Acetic acid bacteria
- Lactic acid bacteria
