= Jun (drink) =

Fermented drink similar to kombucha

Jun, or xun, is a fermented drink similar to kombucha, differing only in that its base ingredients are green tea and honey instead of black tea and cane sugar. Jun is brewed by fermenting green tea (which has been sweetened with honey) with a symbiotic culture of bacteria and yeast (SCOBY). Fruits, sweeteners, spices, and other flavor enhancers are also commonly added to make the taste of the beverage more appealing. Though jun bears similarities to other fermented drinks like kombucha, water kefir, and kvass, it has enough differences to be considered a distinct drink.

== Background ==
=== Origin and ingredients ===
Jun is composed primarily of green tea and honey, whereas kombucha is made of black tea and cane sugar. The fermentation process also requires a symbiotic colony of bacteria and yeast (SCOBY). Jun has a sweeter taste, higher price (due to the cost of its ingredients), and limited availability. Although it is still not clear where jun was initially created, it is claimed by Western vendors to have been developed thousands of years ago by the monks of Bon in Tibet and northern China.

American food writer Sandor Katz casts doubt on this claim, however, and believes it to be a modern invention that has been attributed to Tibet as a marketing gimmick: "The lack of credible information on the history of jun leads me to the conclusion that it is a relatively recent divergence from the kombucha family tree. Some websites claim that it comes from Tibet, where it has been made for 1,000 years; unfortunately, books on Tibetan food, and even a specialized book on Himalayan ferments, contain no mention of it."

== Fermentation process ==
The fermentation process for jun typically takes 5–7 days, which is much quicker than most other fermented drinks. Brewing jun technically only requires one step, but is often done in two steps, as the additional procedure can add the flavor and carbonation that makes the drink more palatable. Creating jun requires a jar (glass or porcelain are typically used), a SCOBY (symbiotic culture of bacteria and yeast), honey, green tea, and filtered water. Actual measurements will vary depending on the recipe used and personal preference.

=== Primary fermentation ===
During the first step of the process, also known as primary fermentation, the living organisms in the SCOBY will consume the honey and give the drink its signature flavor. To brew jun, green tea should be steeped in boiling water for up to 10 minutes. It should then be cooled to room temperature, after which the honey should be added and mixed until it is completely dissolved. After this, the SCOBY should be added to the jar, which should then be covered and left to ferment. Ideal fermentation temperature for jun is between 70-80 degrees Fahrenheit. After five days, the jun should be tasted and assessed for sweetness. If it is too sweet, it should be left to continue fermenting and tasted daily until it reaches the desired level (it can be left to ferment for up to 21 days).

=== Secondary fermentation ===
The secondary fermentation is not required, but adds carbonation and additional flavor that many jun drinkers prefer to the unflavored jun brewed in primary fermentation. For this step, the unflavored jun should be bottled in an airtight container with fruits, honey, spices, or any other flavoring agent the brewer wants to add. The closed environment prevents the carbon dioxide created from escaping, resulting in carbonation. The secondary fermentation should be cultured for 1–3 days at room temperature, and then the bottle should be opened and refrigerated until consumed. The longer the secondary fermentation, the more intensely carbonated and flavored the jun will be.
