= 2-dehydro-3-deoxygalactonokinase =

InterPro Family

Identifiers
- EC no.: 2.7.1.58
- CAS no.: 37278-05-0

Databases
- IntEnz: IntEnz view
- BRENDA: BRENDA entry
- ExPASy: NiceZyme view
- KEGG: KEGG entry
- MetaCyc: metabolic pathway
- PRIAM: profile
- PDB structures: RCSB PDB PDBe PDBsum
- Gene Ontology: AmiGO / QuickGO
Search
- PMC: articles
- PubMed: articles
- NCBI: proteins

2-dehydro-3-deoxygalactonokinase (EC 2.7.1.58) is an enzyme that catalyzes the chemical reaction

ATP +
2-dehydro-3-deoxy-D-galactonic acid
ADP +
2-dehydro-3-deoxy-D-galactonic acid 6-phosphate

The enzyme characterised from Gluconobacter liquefaciens converts -dehydro-3-deoxy-D-galactonic acid to 2-dehydro-3-deoxy-D-galactonic acid 6-phosphate by transferring a phosphate group from the cofactor, adenosine triphosphate (ATP), which is converted to adenosine diphosphate (ADP).

This enzyme is a transferase, specifically one transferring phosphorus-containing groups (phosphotransferases) with an alcohol group as acceptor. The systematic name of this enzyme class is ATP:2-dehydro-3-deoxy-D-galactonate 6-phosphotransferase. Other names in common use include 2-keto-3-deoxygalactonokinase, 2-keto-3-deoxygalactonate kinase (phosphorylating), and 2-oxo-3-deoxygalactonate kinase.
