= Colombia–Ukraine relations =

- Colombia: Ukraine

Colombia–Ukraine relations refer to the international relations between the Republic of Colombia and Ukraine, both sovereign republics that are full member states of the United Nations.

== History ==
The relations between the two nations began in the late 20th century, following Ukraine's Declaration of Independence in 1991 as a sovereign republic. Previously, bilateral affairs between the two countries were handled by Colombia-Soviet relations, from the central government in Moscow on the Soviet side, for diplomatic matters. It was not until the following year that bilateral diplomatic relations were established on August 20, 1992.

Colombia was one of the first countries in the Americas to declare the Holodomor a genocide committed against the Ukrainian people.

In 2016, Ukraine was accepted as an observer member of the Pacific Alliance, a regional organization of which Colombia is a founding state.

During the Russian invasion of Ukraine, Colombia had initially sided with Ukraine, accusing Russia of violating international law and Ukrainian sovereignty, and providing humanitarian aid and moral support to Ukraine. However, following Gustavo Petro's rise to power, Colombia adopted a position of neutrality in the conflict, refusing to send weapons or any other kind of support to Ukraine.

== High-level visits ==
On August 21, 2013, Colombian Foreign Minister María Ángela Holguín Cuéllar received her Ukrainian counterpart, Leonid Kozhara, on an official visit in Bogotá, the first time a high-ranking Ukrainian official has visited the South American country.

== Business relations ==
There is a frequent flow of goods by maritime transport between the ports of Barranquilla, Buenaventura, Cartagena de Indias and Santa Marta with Odesa. Between 2016 and 2017, the main products exported to Ukraine from Colombia were sunflower oil, corn, wheat and meslin; while the main products imported to Colombia from Ukraine were refined petroleum, liquefied gas and coal.

== Diplomatic missions ==
- Colombia has an honorary consulate in Kyiv concurrent with the Colombian embassy in Warsaw, Poland.
- Ukraine has an honorary consulate in Bogotá, which is concurrent with the Ukrainian embassy in Lima, Peru.
