= GT Dave =

American businessman

- Born: George Thomas Dave; 1977 (age 48–49); Beverly Hills, California, United States
- Occupations: Founder and CEO of GT's Living Foods

George Thomas Dave is an American businessman and founder and CEO of the kombucha company GT's Living Foods. In the late 1990s, he was the first to put kombucha on store shelves, and his company currently owns 40% of the U.S. kombucha market.

== Early life and education ==
GT Dave was born in 1977 to Laraine and Michael Dave as the youngest of three sons.

In 1992, a family friend gifted them a SCOBY which she said had been given to her by a Buddhist nun. Dave's parents began homebrewing kombucha when Dave was a freshman at Beverly Hills High School. Dave's parents and his older brother Adam immediately took to the new drink, but he thought that it was weird, later recalling, "I thought, 'everyone thinks we're The Addams Family.'"

In 1994, Laraine was diagnosed with breast cancer and underwent a lumpectomy and a year of chemotherapy and radiation. During her battle with breast cancer, she drank the home-brewed kombucha. After she was cured of the disease, she attributed her recovery to kombucha's health benefits.

While he was taking business classes at Santa Monica College after leaving high school early and receiving his GED, Dave began home-brewing kombucha himself, with the intention to bring it to market.

== Career ==
Dave was the first to put kombucha on store shelves. His first sale of kombucha (which he marketed as GT's Kombucha) was to Erewhon Natural Foods in 1995, when he sold two cases (24 bottles), nearly all of which were sold in the first day. From his bedroom, he would call buyers, distributors and store owners, using different voices to pose as different employees.

He continued to home-brew kombucha in his family home. His operation quickly outgrew the kitchen and expanded to the living room. Dave would sleep from 4 p.m. to midnight, working while his family slept. His mother, Laraine, helped him market the product by setting up tasting tables and sharing her cancer story.

GT's Kombucha continued to grow, and by December 1997, he was selling 30 to 50 cases per day. He opened a brewery in a 2,000-square-foot industrial space in Gardena, beginning distribution through Whole Foods Market

Rebranded as GT's Living Foods, the company now produces over one million bottles per year in its 100,000-square-foot campus in Vernon. Dave has declined multiple acquisition offers and remains sole owner of GT's Living Foods, which is worth over $900 million and represents 40% of the U.S. kombucha market.

In 2019, Dave donated one million dollars to Kombucha Brewers International in an effort to solidify a “standard of identity to protect the integrity of the product.”

== Legal issues ==
In 2017, Dave's company and Whole Foods Market reached a $8.25 million settlement and were ordered to change its kombucha labeling to remove false health claims. The suit also alleged that the kombucha's packaging was dangerous when the gas-producing contents developed pressure.

In 2023, a Los Angeles County Superior Court decision found that Dave's Vernon, California factory subjected its workers to "deplorable and abusive and disturbing working conditions", requiring workers to take 12- to 14-hour shifts, denying them breaks and overtime pay. Judge William Highberger characterized Dave, who testified in his own defense, as having "demonstrated a total absence of credibility." The judge previously told Dave's lawyers, "I, frankly, found that Mr. Dave lied through his teeth and is not in any way, shape, or form credible." The company was ordered to pay over $450,000 in unpaid wages and other restitution as the years-long case enters its next phase, covering labor violations and alleged inhumane working conditions for 3,600 workers.

In 2024, a third employment discrimination suit was filed against Dave's Vernon, California headquarters citing retaliation, failure to take steps necessary to stop discrimination from occurring, and failing to provide a reasonable accommodation. The case, filed in Los Angeles Superior Court, alleges that an employee requested an accommodation in 2023 and was terminated one week later. The complaint says the prior to the termination, GT Dave was aware of the employee's concerns and did nothing to intervene.

== Personal life ==
Dave, who is gay, married Allan Fanucchi in Hawaii in 2019. In 2023, Dave purchased a $14-million hilltop estate in Beverly Hills to complement other 2 nearby homes.

He has said that he drinks eight to twelve bottles (1 to 1.5 gallons or 3.8–5.7 liters) of his kombucha per day and taste-tests each batch.

In 1996, Dave’s older brother Justin died due to bone cancer. After Justin's death, Dave's parents divorced. He remains close with his mother Laraine, whose cancer recovery is featured in the marketing of GT's Living Foods. His eldest brother, Adam, graduated from Louisiana State University's medical school in 2008.

== Sources ==
Fake Doctors, Real Friends. Episode 402
