= Symbiotic fermentation =

Form of fermentation

Symbiotic fermentation is a form of fermentation in which multiple organisms (yeasts, acetic acid bacteria, lactic acid bacteria and others) interact in symbiosis in order to produce the desired product. For example, a yeast may produce ethanol, which is then consumed by an acetic acid bacterium. Described early on as the fermentation of sugars following saccharification in a mixed fermentation process.

== History ==
The earliest mention of the term can be found in a lecture given by Dr. Allan Macfadyen of the Jenner Institute of Preventative Medicine in 1902. Dr. Macfadyen described symbiotic fermentation as noting "a close relationship between the organisms at work, the action of one aiding or modifying the action of the other, whilst both members are more active as a results of the partnership." Fermentative microorganisms have had a deep history as seen by kefir and kumis fermentations of milk by Nomadic tribes in Russia, as well as Japanese koji fermentation (see Aspergillus oryzae).

In 1927, Dr. Aldo Castellani defined symbiotic fermentation as "two microorganisms neither of which alone produces fermentation with gas in certain carbohydrates, may do so when living in symbiosis or when artificially mixed." He based this definition on the observation that ordinary bakers yeast consisted of two or more microorganisms- Saccharomyces and Bacilli. He performed experiments to show that when two different Bacilli species were grown in culture together with maltose as the sugar, gas was produced as a result of symbiotic fermentation. Dr. Castellani also described symbiotic fermentation as a method to distinguish between Bacillus dysentariae Shiga (now Shigella dysentariae Shiga) and B. dysentariae Flexner (now Shigella flexneri) by fermenting each of them with Bacillus morgani (now Morganella morganii) in mannitol. The culture with Flexner would always produce gas and acid, while the culture with Shiga only produced acid. To summarize, one bacteria performs acid fermentation to produce acid from sugar, then the other bacteria performs gas fermentation using the acid products to produce gas. Thus creating a type of symbiotic relationship based on fermentation metabolism.

More recently, symbiotic fermentation is described in a traditional sense for the fermentation of food and beverage products. Biofilm Aggregates of fermentative microorganisms are commonly associated with fermentation of many products including vinegar, sake, shochu, and kefir. In the U.S., kombucha has become a popular fermented beverage that is also a model of symbiotic fermentation. In kombucha, bacteria create the biofilm network that initiates SCOBY formation, while the yeast produce invertase that makes sugars available to the bacteria and yeast for fermentation.

== Examples of symbiotic fermentation ==
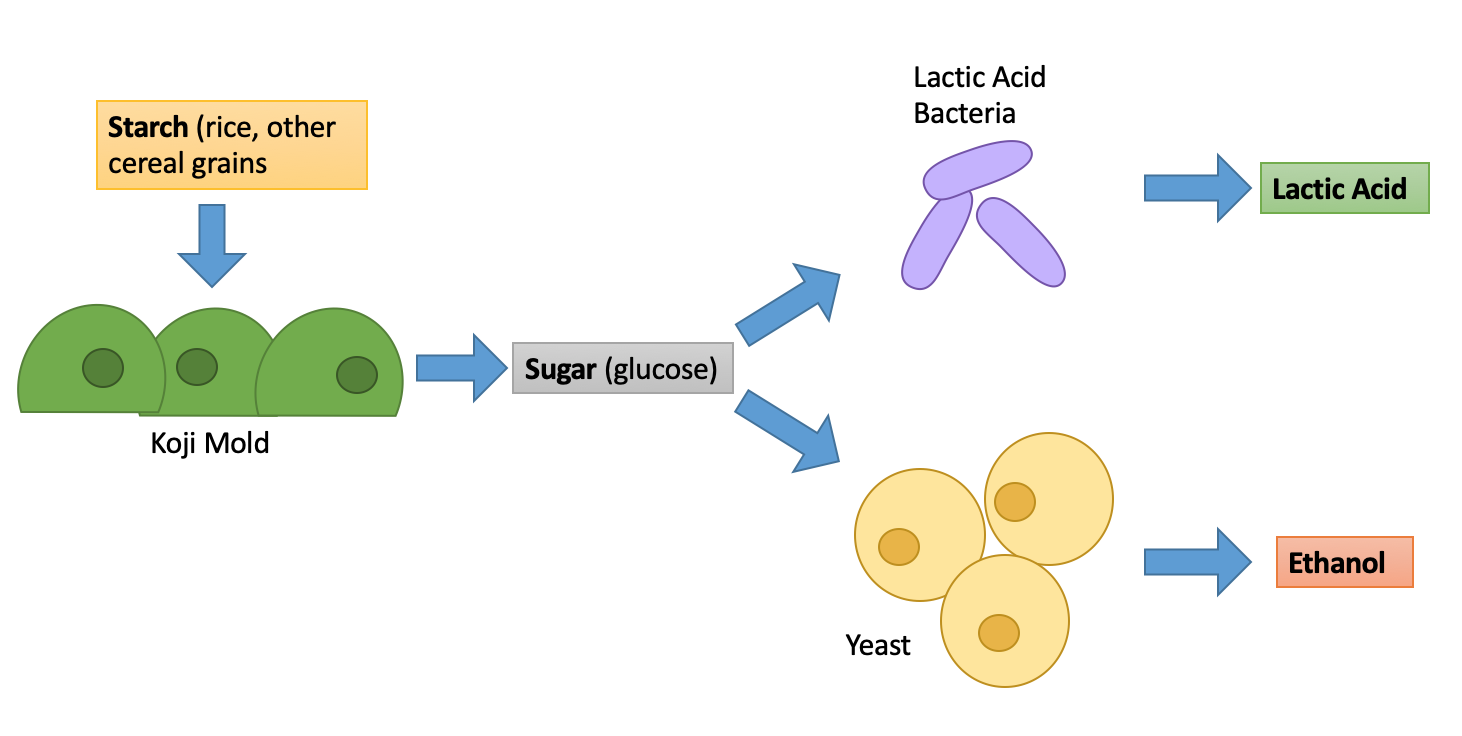
Representation of Symbiotic Fermentation in Koji Culture

- Kefir
  - In Kefir, the lactose in milk is fermented by lactic acid bacteria to produce lactic acid, further breakdown to propionic acid is done by propionibacteria. Yeast in Kefir ferment to produce ethanol, which is consumed by other bacteria to make acids and aldehydes that contribute to flavor.
- Sake
  - In the making of Sake, Koji molds are used to ferment rice producing free sugars that are then fermented by lactic acid bacteria (LAB) and yeast, providing ethanol and flavor active compounds.
- Lambic Beer
  - Wheat is fermented by yeast and LAB.
- Shochu
  - Rice, wheat, and batata are fermented by mold, yeast, and LAB.
- Vinegar
  - Rice is fermented by mold, yeast, LAB, and acetic acid bacteria.
- Soy Sauce
  - Soy bean and wheat are fermented by mold, yeast, and LAB.
- Whiskey
  - Barley, corn, and rye are fermented by yeast and LAB.
- Wine
  - Grapes are fermented by yeast and LAB.
- Kombucha
  - Tea and sucrose are fermented by yeast and acetic acid bacteria from a SCOBY.
