= Kombucha =

Fermented tea beverage

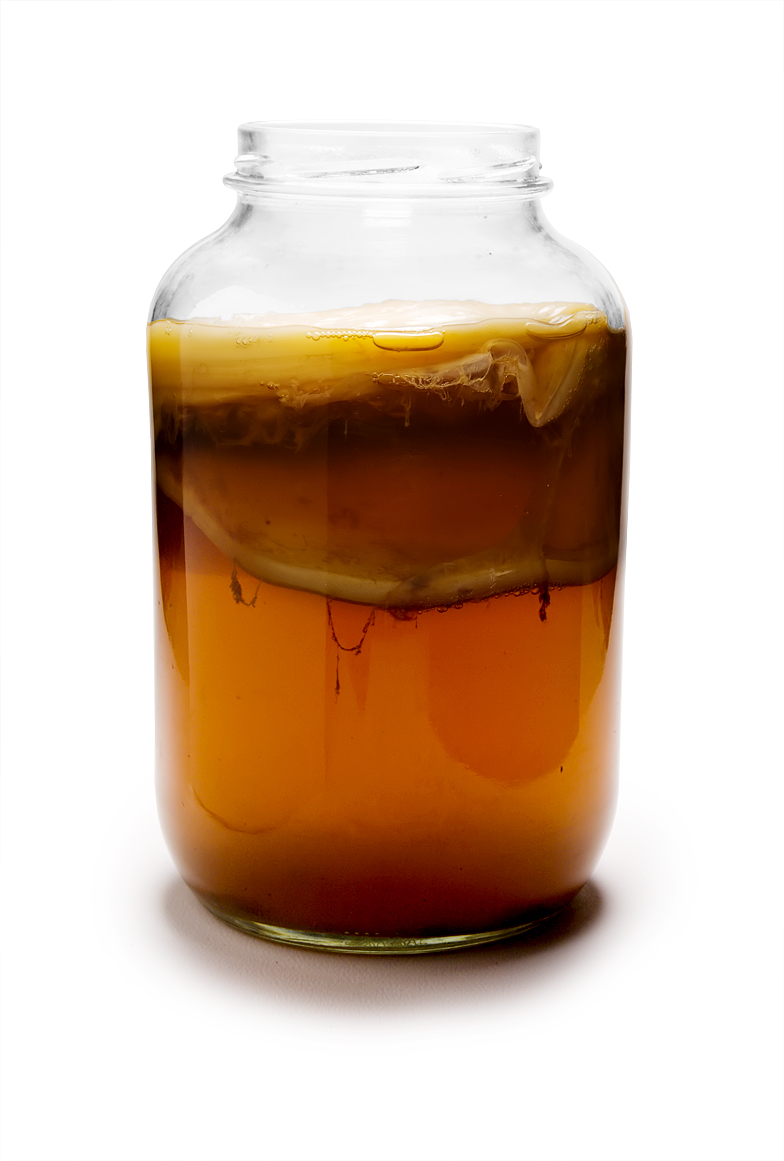
- Kombucha tea, including the culture of bacteria and yeast, which is not usually consumed
- Type: Flavored cold tea drink with fermentation byproducts
- Origin: China
- Alcohol by volume: <0.5% (commercial)
- Proof (US): <1 (commercial)
- Color: Cloudy, commonly pale or dark brown and sometimes green
- Flavor: Fermented, effervescent
- Ingredients: Tea, sugar, bacteria, yeast
- Variants: Fruit juices or spices added
- Related products: Water kefir, kefir, kvass, beer, iced tea

Kombucha (/kɒmˈbuːtʃə/ kom-BOO-chə; also tea mushroom, tea fungus, or Manchurian mushroom when referring to the culture; Latin name Medusomyces gisevii) is a fermented, effervescent and sweetened black tea drink. Sometimes the beverage is called kombucha tea to distinguish it from the culture of bacteria and yeast. Juice, spices, fruit, or other flavorings are often added. Commercial kombucha contains small amounts of alcohol.

Kombucha is believed to have originated in China, where the drink is regionally traditional. While it is named after the Japanese term for kelp tea in English, the two drinks have no relation. By the early 20th century kombucha spread to Russia, then other parts of Eastern Europe and Germany. Kombucha is now homebrewed globally, and also bottled and sold commercially. The global kombucha market was worth approximately US$1.7 billion as of 2019.

Kombucha is produced by symbiotic fermentation of sugared tea using a symbiotic culture of bacteria and yeast (SCOBY) commonly called a "mother" or "mushroom". The microbial populations in a SCOBY vary. The yeast component generally includes Saccharomyces cerevisiae, along with other species; the bacterial component almost always includes Gluconacetobacter xylinus to oxidize yeast-produced alcohols to acetic acid (and other acids). Although the SCOBY is commonly called "tea fungus" or "mushroom", it is actually "a symbiotic growth of acetic acid bacteria and osmophilic yeast species in a zoogleal mat [biofilm]". The living bacteria are said to be probiotic, one of the reasons for the popularity of the drink.

Numerous health benefits have been claimed to correlate with drinking kombucha; there is little evidence to support any of these claims. The beverage has caused rare serious adverse effects, possibly arising from contamination during home preparation. It is not recommended for therapeutic purposes.

== History ==
Kombucha may have originated in the Bohai Sea region of China, but its history is not well documented. At least before the 20th century, some traditional Chinese medicine practitioners used it as a remedy for lung and stomach ailments, but the drink was not widely known across the country. It spread to Russia before reaching Eastern/Central Europe, where it appeared in an 1852 work. It gained popularity in the United States during the turn of the 21st century. In the intervening years, its popularity in the West eclipsed its popularity in China, where it remains less known, though consumption is increasing in many East Asian countries.

Numerous myths surrounding the history of kombucha have been perpetuated by Western marketing gimmicks. There is no evidence that kombucha originated in Qin dynasty China and that it was served to Emperor Qin Shi Huang. Furthermore, there is no evidence that kombucha was ever present in Korea or Japan before the late 20th century, making claims that a Korean doctor named Kombu served the drink to Japanese Emperor Ingyo entirely apocryphal.

Kombucha was first introduced to Japan from Russia and became a health fad in the country following the publication of Sumako Nakamitsu's 1974 bestseller Kōcha Kinoko Health Methods. Although kombucha (as hǎibǎo) had already been consumed in China before the 1940s, a national craze did not occur until the 1980s as a result of the 1970s craze in Japan. This craze died down amid warnings of kojic acid, reports of contamination in home-made cultures, and insufficient capabilities for industrial production. In addition, Chen Jin-Shu of National Chung Hsing University noted that kombucha was briefly home-made in Taiwan under the name hóngchá gū (Chinese: 紅茶菇; from Japanese kōcha kinoko) in the 1960s.

=== Commercialization ===
With an alcohol content under 0.5%, kombucha is not federally regulated in the U.S. Commercially bottled kombucha became available in the late 1990s. In 2010, elevated alcohol levels were found in many bottled kombucha products, leading retailers including Whole Foods to pull the drinks from store shelves temporarily. In response, kombucha suppliers reformulated their products to have lower alcohol levels. Again prior to 2015, some commercially available kombucha brands were found to contain alcohol content exceeding the 0.5% threshold, sparking the development of new testing methods.

By 2014, US sales of bottled kombucha were $400 million, $350 million of which was by Millennium Products, Inc. which sells GT's Kombucha. In 2014, several companies that make and sell kombucha formed a trade organization, Kombucha Brewers International. In 2016, PepsiCo purchased kombucha maker KeVita for approximately $200 million. In the US, sales of kombucha and other fermented drinks rose by 37 percent in 2017. Beer companies like Full Sail Brewing Company and Molson Coors Beverage Company produce kombucha by themselves or via subsidiaries.

As of 2021, the drink had some popularity in India's National Capital Region, partly due to its success in the west.

With rising popularity in developed countries in the early 21st century, kombucha sales increased after it was marketed as an alternative to beer and other alcoholic drinks in restaurants and pubs.

According to the market research firm Grand View Research, kombucha had a global market size of US$1.67 billion as of 2019 and has been expected to grow to US$9.7 billion by 2030.

== Etymology and terminology ==
The etymology of kombucha is uncertain, but it is believed to be a misapplied loanword from Japanese. English speakers may have confused the Japanese word konbucha with kōcha kinoko (紅茶キノコ, 'black tea mushroom'), popularized around 1975. In Japanese, the term konbu-cha (昆布茶, 'kelp tea') refers to a kelp tea made with konbu (an edible kelp from the family Laminariaceae) and is a completely different beverage from the fermented tea usually associated with kombucha elsewhere in the world.

Merriam-Webster's Dictionary suggests kombucha in English arose from misapplication of Japanese words like konbucha, kobucha 'tea made from kelp', konbu, from kobu 'kelp', + cha 'tea'. The American Heritage Dictionary notes the term might have originated from the observation that the gelatinous film of kombucha resembled seaweed. The first known use in the English language of the word appeared in the British Chemical Abstracts in 1928.

In Chinese, kombucha was historically known as hǎibǎo (simplified Chinese: 海宝; traditional Chinese: 海寶; lit. 'sea treasure'), derived from the SCOBY's resemblance to a jellyfish, and wèibǎo (simplified Chinese: 胃宝; traditional Chinese: 胃寶; lit. 'stomach treasure'), referring to its perceived medicinal benefits. Today, it is commonly called hóngchá jūn (simplified Chinese: 红茶菌; traditional Chinese: 紅茶菌; lit. 'red tea fungus'), a term based on the Japanese kōcha kinoko. In Taiwan, it is more commonly known as kāngpǔ chá (Chinese: 康普茶), a term based on the English name.

== Composition and properties ==
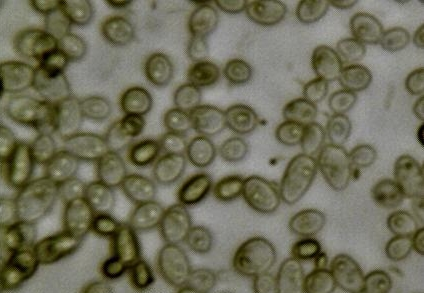
Yeast and bacteria in kombucha magnified 400 times

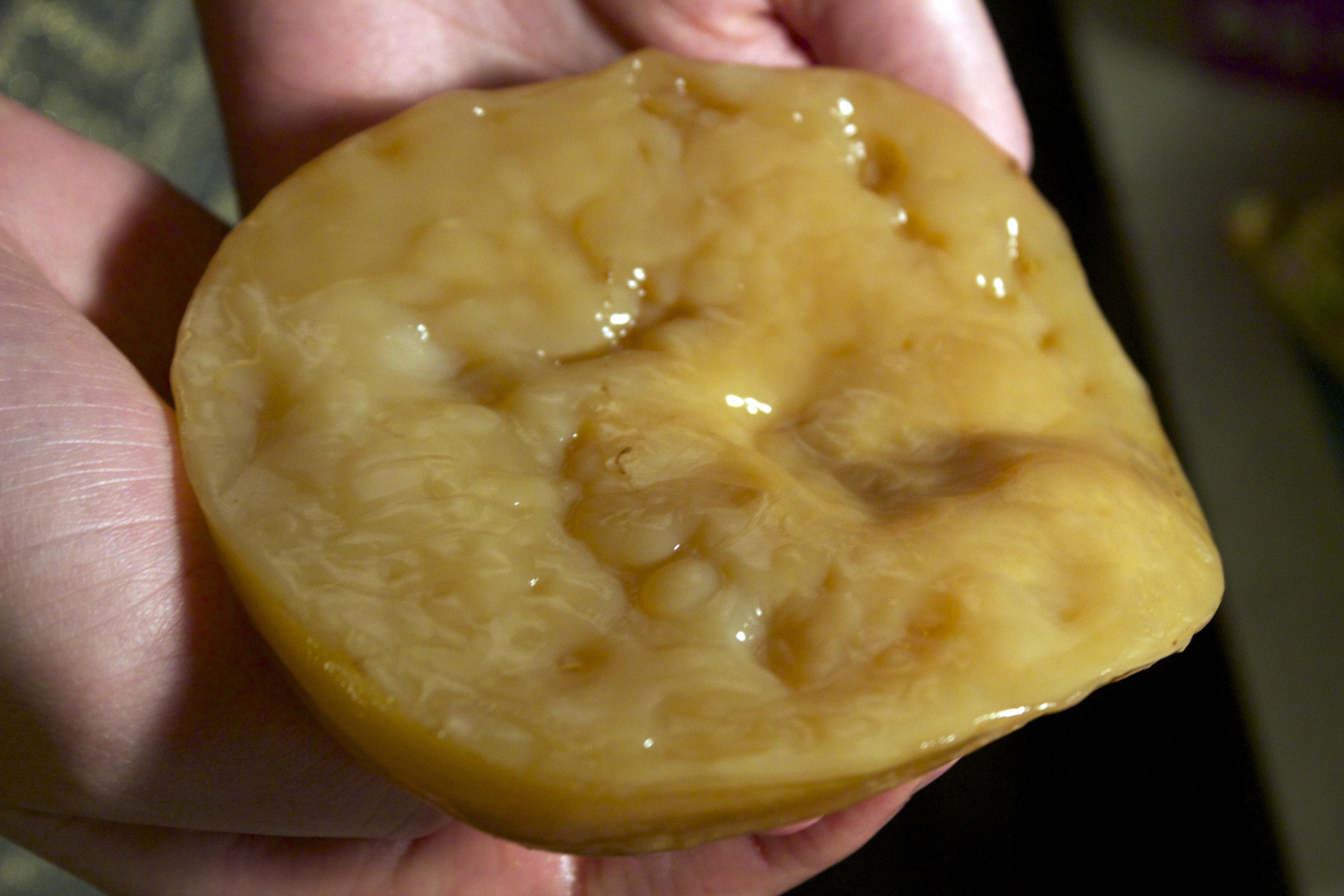
A SCOBY used for brewing kombucha

=== Biological ===
A kombucha culture is a symbiotic culture of bacteria and yeast (SCOBY), similar to mother of vinegar, containing one or more species each of bacteria and yeasts, which form a zoogleal mat known as a "mother". There is a broad spectrum of yeast species spanning several genera reported to be present in kombucha cultures, including species of Zygosaccharomyces, Candida, Kloeckera/Hanseniaspora, Torulaspora, Pichia, Brettanomyces/Dekkera, Saccharomyces, Lachancea, Saccharomycoides, Schizosaccharomyces, Kluyveromyces, Starmera, Eremothecium, Merimbla, Sugiyamaella.

The bacterial component of kombucha comprises several species, almost always including the acetic acid bacteria Komagataeibacter xylinus (formerly Gluconacetobacter xylinus), which ferments alcohols produced by the yeasts into acetic and other acids, increasing the acidity and limiting ethanol content. The population of bacteria and yeasts found to produce acetic acid has been reported to increase for the first 4 days of fermentation, decreasing thereafter. K. xylinus produces bacterial cellulose, and is reportedly responsible for most or all of the physical structure of the "mother", which may have been selectively encouraged over time for firmer (denser) and more robust cultures by brewers. The highest diversity of kombucha bacteria was found to be on the 7th day of fermentation with the diversity being less in the SCOBY. Acetobacteraceae dominate 88 percent of the bacterial community of the SCOBY. The acetic acid bacteria in kombucha are aerobic, meaning that they require oxygen for their growth and activity. Hence, the bacteria initially migrate and assemble at the air interface, followed by the excretion of bacterial cellulose after about 2 days.

The mixed, presumably mutualistic culture has been further described as being lichenous, in accord with the reported presence of the known lichenous natural product usnic acid, though as of 2015, no report appears indicating the standard cyanobacterial species of lichens in association with kombucha fungal components.

=== Chemical composition ===
Kombucha is made by adding the kombucha culture into a broth of sugared tea. The sugar serves as a nutrient for the SCOBY that allows for bacterial growth in the tea. Sucrose is converted, biochemically, into fructose and glucose, and these into gluconic acid and acetic acid. In addition, kombucha contains enzymes and amino acids, polyphenols, and various other organic acids which vary between preparations.

Other specific components include ethanol (see below), glucuronic acid, glycerol, lactic acid, and usnic acid (a hepatotoxin, see below).

The alcohol content of kombucha is usually less than 0.5%, but increases with extended fermentation times. Some tests have found commercial kombuchas with a range of alcohol contents ranging from undetectable to 4%. The concentration of alcohol, specifically ethanol, increases initially but then begins to decrease when acetic acid bacteria use it to produce acetic acid. Over-fermentation generates high amounts of acids similar to vinegar. The pH of the drink is typically about 3.5.

=== Nutritional content ===
Kombucha tea is 95% water and contains 4% carbohydrates and several B vitamins, such as thiamin, riboflavin, niacin, and vitamin B_{6}.

== Production ==
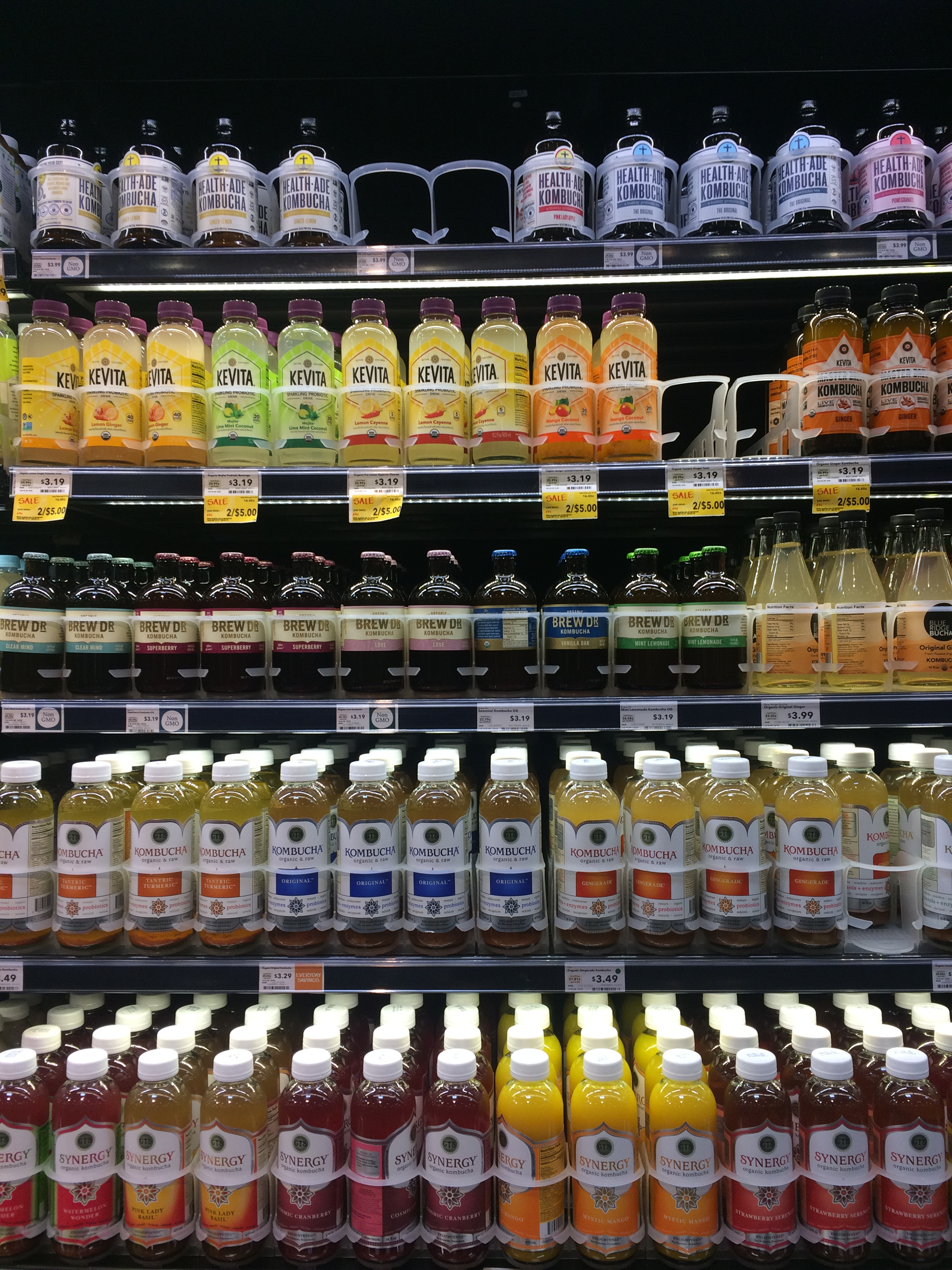
Several brands of commercial kombucha on store shelves, Eastern Pennsylvania, 2019

Kombucha can be prepared at home or commercially. It is made by dissolving sugar in non-chlorinated boiling water. Tea leaves are then steeped in the hot sugar water and discarded. The sweetened tea is cooled and the SCOBY culture is added. The mixture is then poured into a sterilized beaker along with previously fermented kombucha tea to lower the pH. This technique is known as "backslopping". The container is covered with a paper towel or breathable fabric to prevent insects, such as fruit flies, from contaminating the kombucha.

The tea is left to ferment for a period of up to 10 to 14 days at room temperature, 18–26 °C (64–79 °F). A new "daughter" SCOBY will form on the surface of the tea to the diameter of the container. After fermentation is completed, the SCOBY is removed and stored along with a small amount of the newly fermented tea. The remaining kombucha is strained and bottled for a secondary ferment for a few days or stored at 4 °C (39 °F).

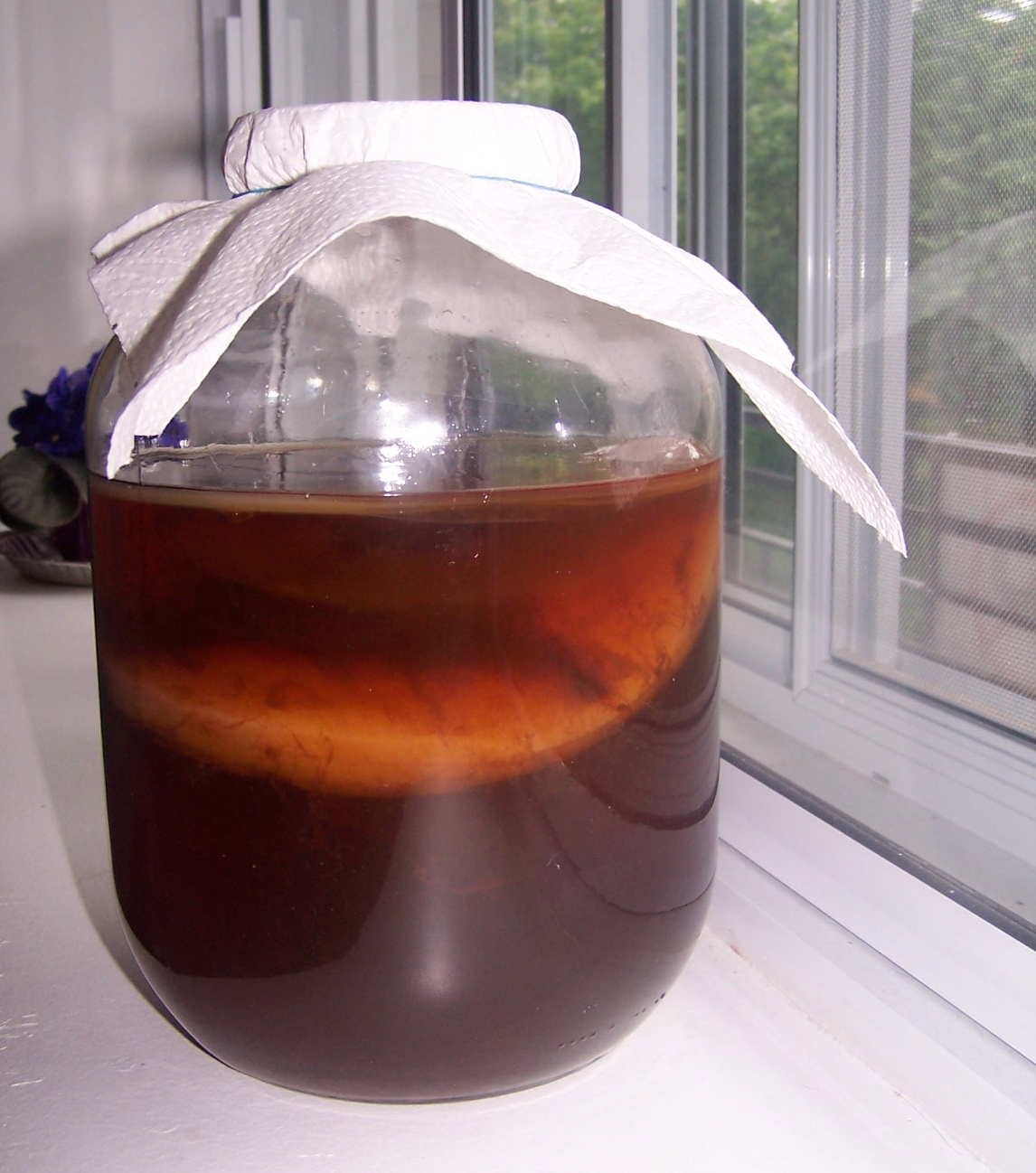
Kombucha culture fermenting in a jar, 2006

=== Hard kombucha ===
Some commercial kombucha producers sell what they call "hard kombucha" with an alcohol content of over 5 percent.

== Health claims ==
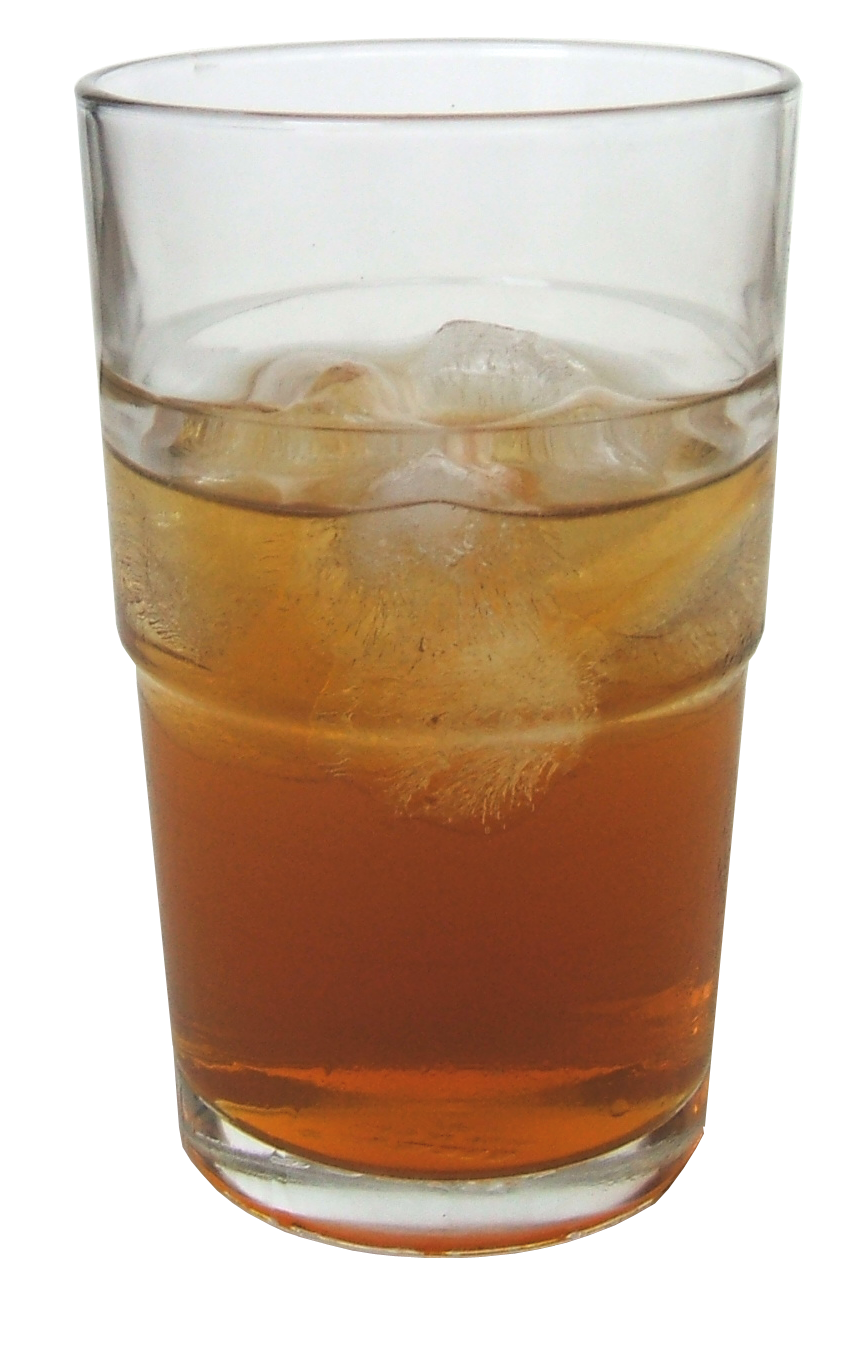
Kombucha tea with ice cubes

Kombucha is promoted with many claims for health benefits, from alleviating hemorrhoids to combating cancer. Although people may drink kombucha for such supposed health effects (attributed first to the protective impact of tea itself, and to fermentation products including glucuronic acid, acetic acid, polyphenols, phenols, and B-complex vitamins such as folic acid), there is no clinical proof that it provides any benefit. A review found only one human study on kombucha. Kombucha is an "extreme example" of an unconventional remedy because of the disparity between implausible, wide-ranging health claims and the potential risks of the product. It concluded that the proposed, unsubstantiated therapeutic claims did not outweigh known risks, and that kombucha should not be recommended for therapeutic use, being in a class of "remedies that only seem to benefit those who sell them".

=== Adverse effects ===
Commercial brands of kombucha have been known to contain high amounts of sugar, and the British Heart Foundation states that added sugars in flavoured kombucha can cause blood sugar levels to rise more quickly. According to the BHF, eating too much sugar can lead to weight gain, which can then heighten the risk of a heart attack or stroke.

Reports of adverse effects related to kombucha consumption are rare, but may be underreported, according to a 2003 review. The American Cancer Society said in 2009 that "serious side effects and occasional deaths have been associated with drinking Kombucha tea." Because kombucha is a commonly homemade fermentation, caution should be taken because pathogenic microorganisms can contaminate the tea during preparation. The risk of proliferation of bacteria associated with botulinum toxin is one reason that the pH of kombucha must be low, as Clostridium botulinum struggles to proliferate below pH 4.6.

Adverse effects associated with kombucha consumption may include severe hepatic (liver) and renal (kidney) toxicity as well as metabolic acidosis.

Some adverse health effects may arise from the acidity of the tea causing acidosis, and brewers are cautioned to avoid over-fermentation. Other adverse effects may be a result of bacterial or fungal contamination during the brewing process. Some studies have found the hepatotoxin usnic acid in kombucha, although it is not known whether the cases of liver damage are due to usnic acid or to some other toxin.

The acidity of kombucha may be threatening to the demineralization of teeth, leading towards later tooth decay. Kombucha surpasses the critical pH of teeth, which is approximately 5.5, which disrupts the chemical stability of the enamel, leading to enamel erosion. Acids react with the bases within calcium hydroxyapatite, the primary component of tooth enamel, neutralizing them and increasing the dissolution of the enamel, causing degradation of the teeth.

Drinking kombucha can be harmful for people with preexisting ailments. Due to its microbial sourcing and possible non-sterile packaging, kombucha is not recommended for people with poor immune function, women who are pregnant or nursing, or children under 4 years old: It may compromise immune responses or stomach acidity in these susceptible populations. There are certain drugs that one should not take with kombucha because of the small percentage of alcohol content.

A 2019 review enumerated numerous potential health risks (including hyponatremia, lactic acidosis, toxic hepatitis, etc.), but said "kombucha is not considered harmful if about 4 oz [120 mL] per day is consumed by healthy individuals; potential risks are associated with a low pH brew leaching heavy metals from containers, excessive consumption of highly acidic kombucha, or consumption by individuals with pre-existing health conditions."

=== Caffeine ===
Kombucha contains a small amount of caffeine.

== Other uses ==
Kombucha culture, when dried, becomes a leather-like textile known as a microbial cellulose that can be molded onto forms to create seamless clothing. Using different broth media such as coffee, black tea, and green tea to grow the kombucha culture results in different textile colors, although the textile can also be dyed using other plant-based dyes. Different growth media and dyes also change the textile's feel and texture. Dried and processed SCOBY has been investigated as a leather substitute. Additionally, the SCOBY itself can be dried and eaten as a sweet or savory snack. Kombucha can be further used for bioleaching of yttrium oxide from waste fluorescent lamp phosphors.

== See also ==
- Cannabis tea, a cannabis-infused drink prepared by steeping various parts of the cannabis plant in hot or cold water
- Enviga, a carbonated green tea drink promoted with bogus health claims
- Jun, a fermented drink made from green tea and honey
- Kefir, a fermented dairy product
- Kvass, a traditional fermented drink made from bread
- List of unproven or disproven cancer treatments
- Mushroom tea, an infusion of mushrooms in water, made by using edible/medicinal mushrooms (such as lingzhi mushroom) or psychedelic mushrooms (such as Psilocybe cubensis)
- Tibicos, or "water kefir"
