= Gluconobacter thailandicus =

Scientific classification
- Domain: Bacteria
- Kingdom: Pseudomonadati
- Phylum: Pseudomonadota
- Class: Alphaproteobacteria
- Order: Rhodospirillales
- Family: Acetobacteraceae
- Genus: Gluconobacter
- Species: G. thailandicus

Binomial name
- Gluconobacter thailandicus Tanasupawat et al. 2005

Species of bacterium

Gluconobacter thailandicus is a species of bacteria, first isolated in Thailand, hence its name. Its type strain is F149-1(T) (=BCC 14116(T) =NBRC 100600(T) =JCM 12310(T) =TISTR 1533(T) =PCU 225(T)).
