= Pellicle (cooking) =

Coating on food

A pellicle is a skin or coating of proteins or cellulose on the surface of meat (e.g. smoked salmon) or fermented beverages (e.g. kombucha).

Pellicles of protein that form due to heating prior to smoking meat (including fish and poultry) allow smoke to better adhere to the surface of the meat during the smoking process. Useful in all smoking applications and with any kind of animal protein, prior heating is best used with fish since the flesh of a fish such as salmon forms a pellicle that will attract more smoke to adhere to it than would be the case if prior heating had not been used.

Pellicles of cellulose that form in fermenting beverages, such as a symbiotic culture of bacteria and yeast (SCOBY), are biofilms that are produced as fermentation takes place.

== Meat and seafood ==
Before cured foods are cold smoked, they can be allowed to air-dry to form a tacky outer layer, known as a pellicle. The pellicle plays a role in producing better smoked products as it acts as a protective barrier for the food and also plays a role in enhancing the flavor and color produced by the smoke.

Most animal proteins can be air dried in some way, often hung or using racks, ensuring airflow to all sides. Various proteins can be air-dried uncovered in a refrigerator or cool room. To encourage pellicle formation, a fan can be used to blow air around drying foods.

== See also ==
- Curing (food preservation)
- List of smoked foods
- SCOBY
