= Liquefied gas =

Gas that has been turned into a liquid by cooling or compressing

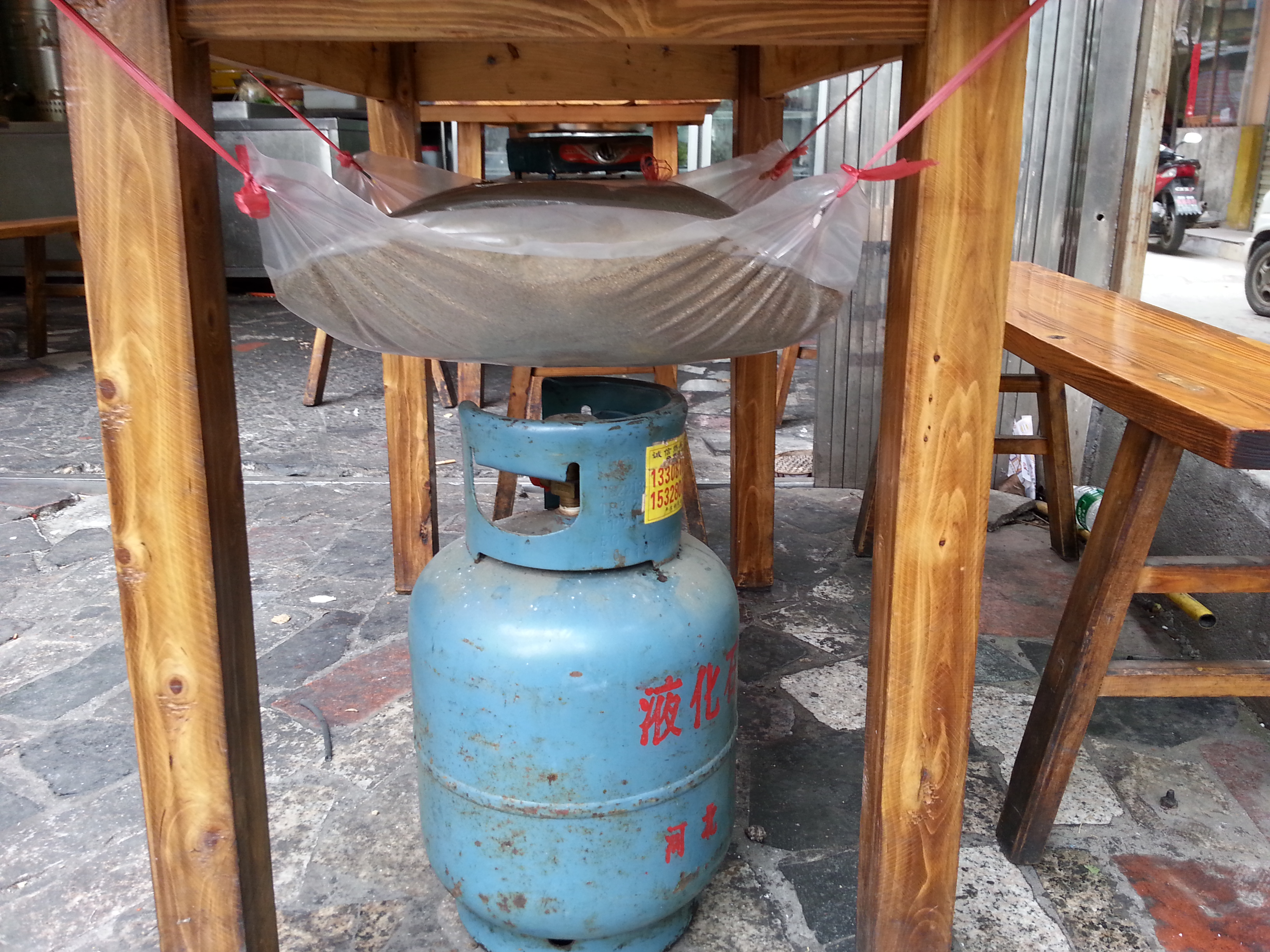
A canister of liquid gas. A plastic bag is placed above and filled with sand. The bag ruptures under fire and releases its content onto the canister, blocking the fire of oxygen supply, extinguishing it in the process

Liquefied gas (sometimes referred to as liquid gas) is a gas that has been turned into a liquid by cooling or compressing it. Examples of liquefied gases include liquid air, liquefied natural gas, and liquefied petroleum gas.

== Liquid air ==
At the Lister Institute of Preventive Medicine, liquid air was introduced as an agent in biological research. An inquiry into the intracellular constituents of the typhoid bacillus, initiated under the direction of Doctor Allan Macfadyen, necessitated the separation of the cell-plasma of the organism. The method initially adopted for the disintegration of the bacteria was to mix them with silver-sand and churn the whole up in a closed vessel in which a series of horizontal vanes revolved at high speed. But certain disadvantages are attached to this procedure, and accordingly, some means were sought to do away with the sand and triturate the bacilli per se. This was found in liquid air, which, as had long before been shown at the Royal Institution, has the power of reducing materials like grass or plant leaves to such a state of brittleness that they can easily be powdered in a mortar. By its aid, a complete trituration of the typhoid bacilli was accomplished at the Jenner Institute, and the same process, already applied with success also to yeast cells and animal cells, was extended in other directions.

When air is liquefied, oxygen and nitrogen condense simultaneously. However, owing to its greater volatility, the latter boils off more quickly of the two, so that the remaining liquid becomes progressively richer in oxygen.

== Liquefied natural gas ==
Liquefied natural gas is natural gas that has been liquefied for storage or transport. Since transporting natural gas requires a large network of pipelines that crosses various terrains and oceans, significant investment and long-term planning are required. Before transport, natural gas is liquefied by pressurization. The liquefied gas is then transported through tankers with special airtight compartments. When the tanks are opened, and the liquid is exposed to atmospheric pressure, it boils off due to latent heat from the air or the container.

== See also ==
- Liquid oxygen
- Liquid nitrogen
- Liquid hydrogen
- Liquid helium
