= Allan Macfadyen =

Scottish bacteriologist

Allan Macfadyen (26 May 1860 in Glasgow – 1 March 1907 in Hampstead, London) was a Scottish bacteriologist, a pioneer in immunization against bacterial infection.

== Early life and education ==
The youngest of four sons of a brass founder in Glasgow, Macfadyen was the son of Archibald Macfadyen and wife Margaret, who was a daughter of D. McKinlay of Stornaway.

Allan Macfadyen was educated at Dr. Bryce's collegiate school at Edinburgh from 1871. In 1878 he became a student in the University of Edinburgh. He graduated there M.B., C.M. (1883), M.D. with gold medal (1886), and BSc in hygiene (1888). He studied chemistry and bacteriology in Berne, Göttingen, and Munich.

== Career ==
Upon his return to England, he became, from 1889 to 1892, a research scholar of the Grocers' Company and lecturer on bacteriology at the College of State Medicine in London. The College was subsequently amalgamated with the British Institute of Preventive Medicine, of which Macfadyen was made director in 1891. (In 1898 the British Institute was renamed the Jenner Institute, and in 1903 the Jenner Institute was renamed the Lister Institute.)

In 1903 Macfadyen was appointed secretary of the Lister Institute's governing body as well as head of its bacteriological department. He was instrumental in planning and organising the present building of the Lister Institute on the Chelsea Embankment. He contracted typhoid fever in 1902 while engaged in investigating its bacillus. From 1901 to 1904 he was Fullerian Professor of Physiology at the Royal Institution. In 1905 he resigned his official position at the Royal Institution to devote himself exclusively to original work.

Macfadyen worked on endotoxins of certain bacteria, such as Vibrio cholerae and Salmonella enterica. To obtain these endotoxins Macfadyen ground up bacteria, rendered brittle by freezing with liquid nitrogen to −190 °C. Sir James Dewar collaborated with him on the use of liquid nitrogen. Macfadyen and Dewar proved that some bacteria retain their bioactivity after freezing to −250 °C. Macfadyen showed that injecting small doses of bacterial endotoxins into experimental animals made them immune to infection by the corresponding living bacteria. Sydney Donville Rowland assisted him in much of the research on endotoxins.

Macfadyen also investigated thermophilic bacteria. Macfadyen and Joseph Edwin Barnard did research on bioluminescence in bacteria.

== Death ==
After he resigned his position at the Royal Institution he accidentally infected himself with typhoid fever, resulting in his death. His widow, Marie, was the daughter of Professor Bartling of Göttingen.

== See also ==
- Symbiotic fermentation

Academic offices
Preceded by Ray Lankester	Fullerian Professor of Physiology; 1901–1904	Succeeded by Louis Compton Miall
