= Kelp tea =

East Asian tea made from seaweed

- Type: Herbal tea
- Ingredients: Kombu kelp

Kelp tea

Chinese name
- Simplified Chinese: 海带茶
- Traditional Chinese: 海帶茶
Transcriptions
Standard Mandarin
- Hanyu Pinyin: Hǎidài Chá

Korean name
- Hangul: 다시마차
- Hanja: 다시마茶
Transcriptions
- Revised Romanization: dasimacha
- McCune–Reischauer: tasimach'a

Japanese name
- Kanji: 昆布茶
- Kana: こんぶちゃ
Transcriptions
- Revised Hepburn: Konbu-cha

Kelp tea or kombu tea is a herbal tea made from kombu, a type of edible kelp. On its own it does not contain any true tea (Camellia sinensis), although kombu may be added to green tea in some cases.

It is called konbu-cha or kobu-cha (昆布茶) in Japan, dasima-cha (다시마차) in Korea and haidai-cha (海带茶) in China, all meaning "kombu tea."

== Varieties ==
=== Japan ===
In Japan, konbu-cha or kobu-cha is kelp tea made by pouring boiling water onto chopped kombu and leaching, or pouring hot water into powdered kombu.

==== Kelp tea for fortune ====
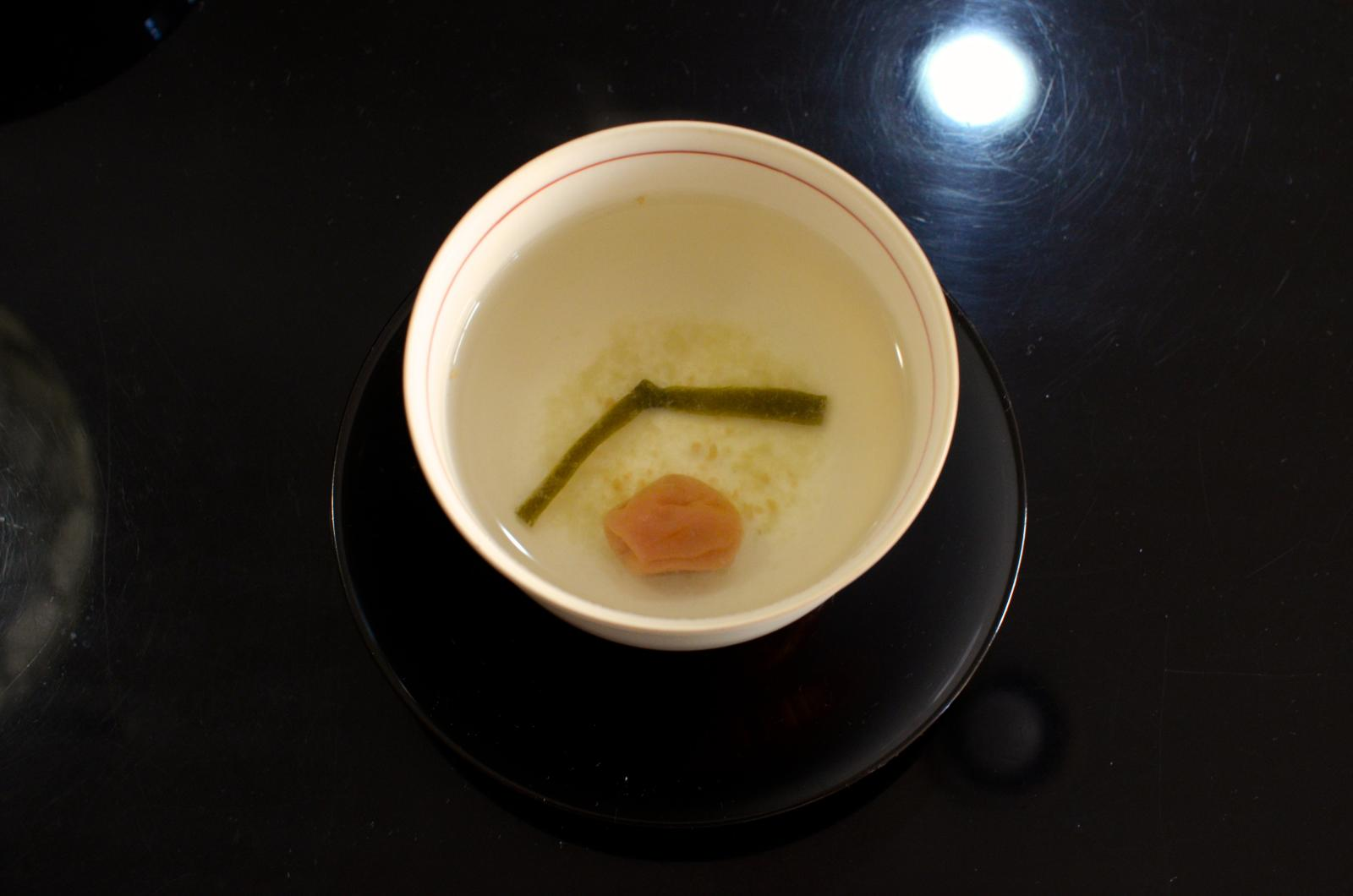
Oo-buku-cha, a type of Japanese tea drink on New Year's Day, consisting of sencha green tea to which knotted kombu kelp and umeboshi (pickled plum) were added.

The tea served on New Year's Day and at weddings is sometime kelp tea because the pronunciation of kombu is similar to that of the last part of "yorokobu" (喜ぶ, meaning "be happy").

Fuku-cha(福茶, meaning "fortune tea") is sencha green tea with kombu, umeboshi (pickled plum), kuromame (black beans), and sanshō (Japanese pepper) and is drunk on the last day of the year (Ōmisoka), in New Year, and on the day before the beginning of spring (Setsubun) in Kansai region, wishing a long life.

In particular, in New Year, oo-buku-cha or dai-buku-cha (大福茶, meaning "very good fortune tea"), which is sencha green tea with kombu and umeboshi, is drunk in Kansai region wishing good health and happiness.

==== Instant kelp tea ====
Powdery kelp tea is sold as an instant tea under the name of konbu-cha or kobu-cha. It is made by drying kombu to a fine powder and blending it with seasonings such as salt and sugar. It's simply dissolved in hot water and enjoyed as a tea. Note that this type of konbu-cha does not contain any true tea (Camellia sinensis).

The powdery kelp tea was invented by the founder of GYOKUROEN "Umazou Fujita" in 1918.

Ume-konbu-cha or ume-Kobu-cha, which is powdery kombu tea with freeze-dried crushed umeboshi, is also sold as an instant tea and is drunk as a tea in the same fashion.

==== History ====
Kelp tea is thought to have been drunk from quite a long time ago because "the Japanese have incorporated kelp and seaweed into their diets for 1,500 years".

It is said that, in 951, Kūya made a statue of the Ekādaśamukha to cure an epidemic that was spreading in the capital and went around the city giving oo-buku-cha to the sick.

Tea using kelp already existed in Edo period (1603–1868) at the latest, and people in these days drank it by pouring boiling water over chopped kelp.

=== Korea ===
Either dried kombu powder or julienned kombu (typically of the species Saccharina japonica) can be used to make the tea.

Powdered tea can be made by pan-frying and pounding cleaned and dried kelp. For a cup of hot water, two to three spoons of kelp powder is used. Optionally, sugar or honey can be added.

Alternatively, around 30 grams (1.1 oz) of cleaned kelp pieces are infused in 300–500 millilitres (11–18 imp fl oz; 10–17 US fl oz) of hot water. The kelp slices are removed after infusing, and salt is added to taste.
