= Water kefir =

Fermented drink

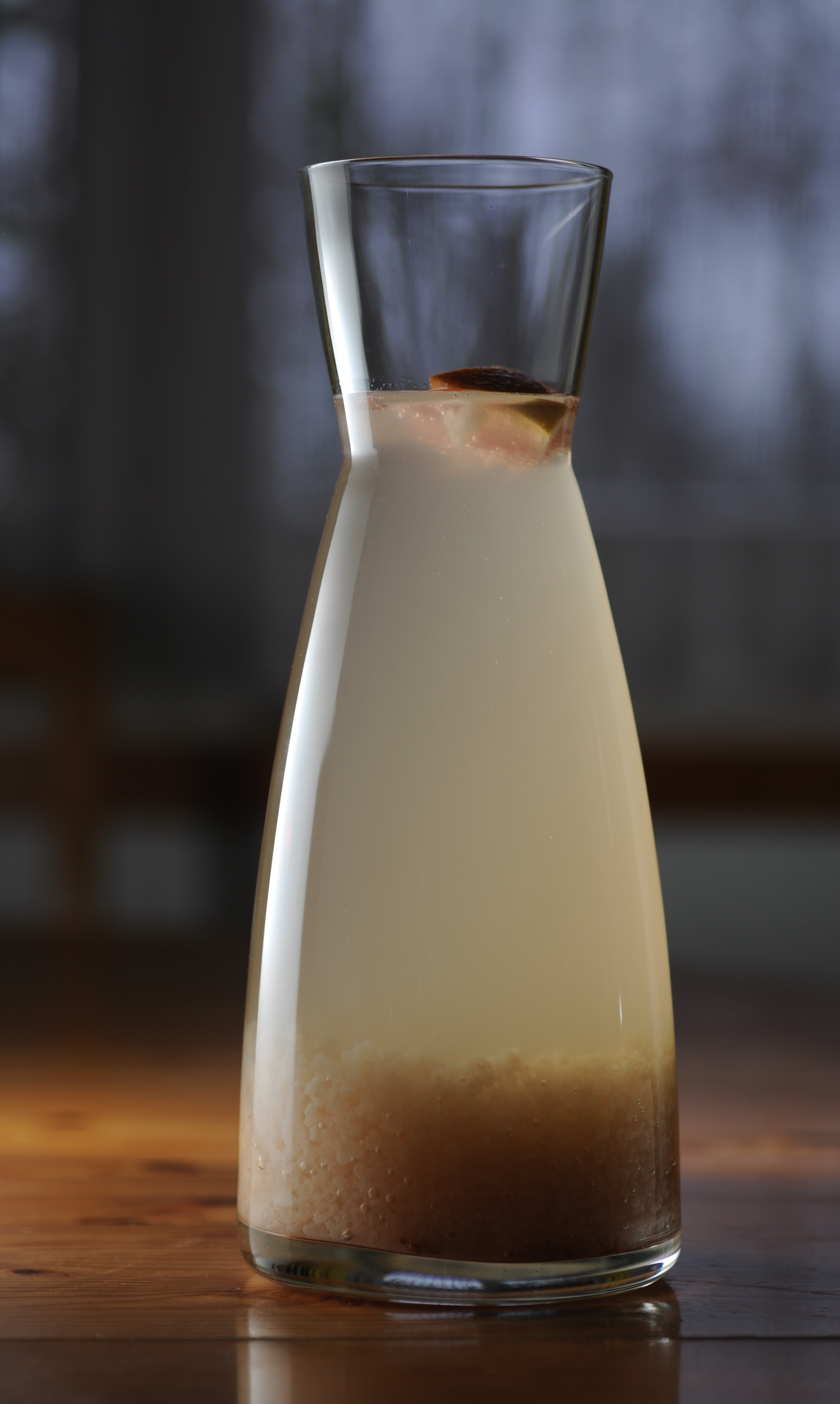
Fermented water kefir with grains on the bottom and a floating piece of grapefruit peel

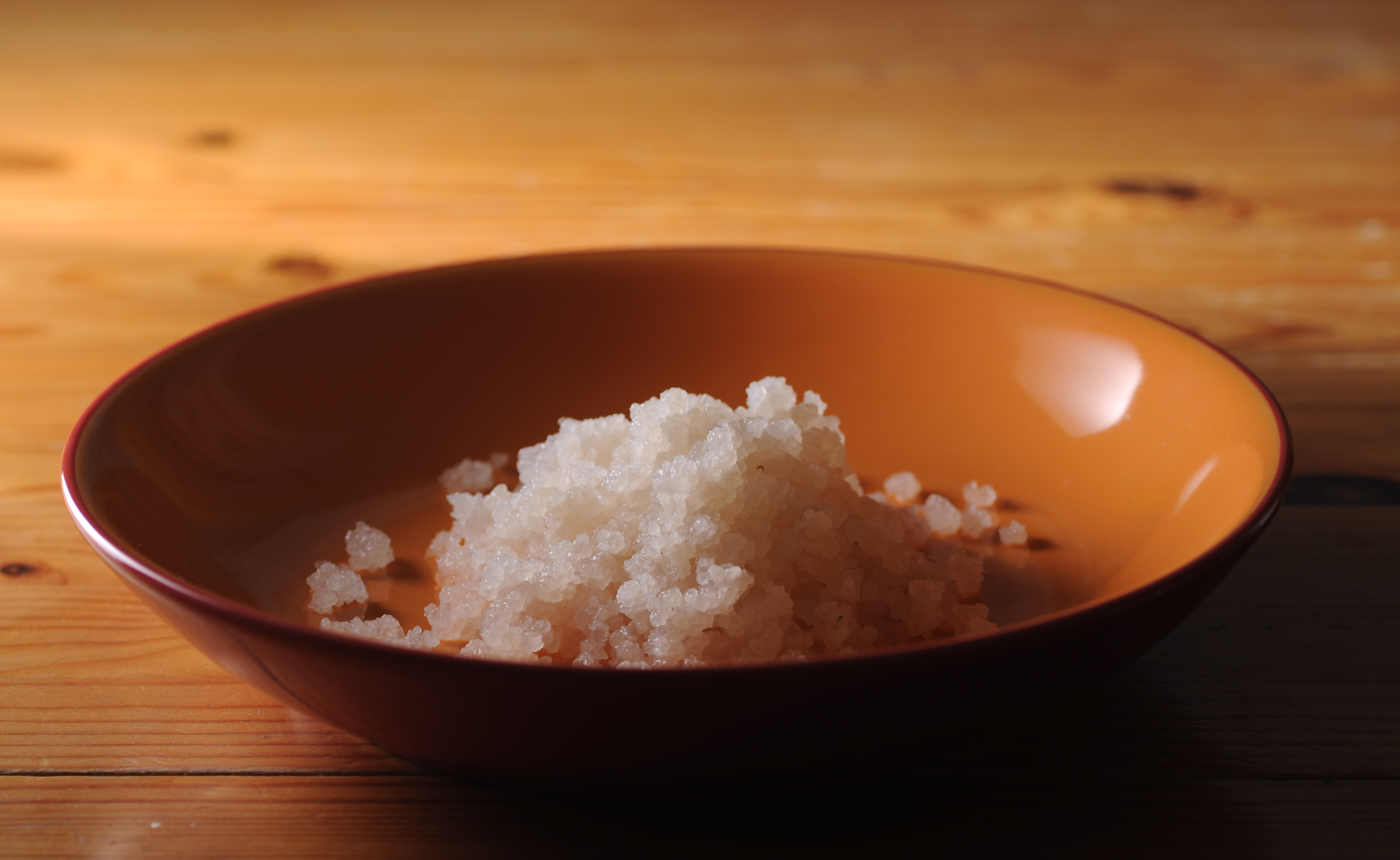
Tibicos grains average 5 mm (1/4 in) in dimension.

Water kefir, known as tibicos in Mexico, is a traditional fermented drink made with water and kefir grains held in a polysaccharide biofilm matrix created by the bacteria. It is sometimes consumed as an alternative to milk-based probiotic drinks or tea-cultured products such as kombucha. Water kefir is typically made as a probiotic homebrew beverage. The finished product, if bottled, will produce a carbonated beverage.

== Origin ==
Water kefir are also known as tibicos, tibi, sugar kefir grains, sugary kefir grains, Japanese water crystals and California bees, and in older literature as bébées, African bees, Australian bees, ginger bees, vinegar bees, bees, Japanese beer seeds, beer seeds, beer plant, ale nuts, eternity grains, and Balm of Gilead. Pidoux in 1898 also identified the sugary kefir grains with the ginger beer plant. Different ingredients or hygienic conditions might also change the bacteriological composition possibly leading to the different names found in scientific literature.

The origin of kefir grains is not known exactly. In 1889, Martinus Beijerinck conjectured that the grains from the ginger beer plant were originally brought by the British soldiers while returning to their country from the Crimean War in 1855. This was later dismissed as unsubstantiated by Harry Marshall Ward in 1892 noting its real origins remain a mystery. As a different theory, Lutz (1899) reported "Tibi grains" which were plucked from the leaves of a Mexican cactus (Opuntia). These granules then could be reconstituted in a sugar-water solution for propagating the tibicos grains.

Ward was the first to publish an account of the composition of water kefir, noting it as a "beverage containing a symbiotic mixture of yeast and bacteria, and containing sufficient amounts of nitrogenous organic matter and beet sugar or cane sugar in its aqueous solution". Another study found a similar tibicos culture made from bacteria cultured from known stocks with similar properties.

Tibicos are used to brew a variety of tepache known as tepache de tibicos. The ginger beer plant is also a form of water kefir. Kebler attests that they were used in Kentucky circa 1859 to brew a "home drink" and were referred to as "japanese beer seeds."

== Cultures ==
Water kefir are found around the world, with no two being exactly the same; but typical water kefir have a mix of Lactobacillus, Streptococcus, Pediococcus and Leuconostoc bacteria, with yeasts from Saccharomyces, Candida, Kloeckera and possibly others. Lactobacillus brevis bacteria has been identified as the species responsible for the production of the dextran polysaccharide that forms the "grains".

As with milk kefir "grains", the microbes present in tibicos act in symbiosis to maintain a stable culture. Tibicos can do this in many different sugary liquids like coconut water, fruit juice or sugar mixed with water, feeding off the sugar to produce lactic acid, alcohol (ethanol), and carbon dioxide gas, which carbonates the drink.

== Preparation ==
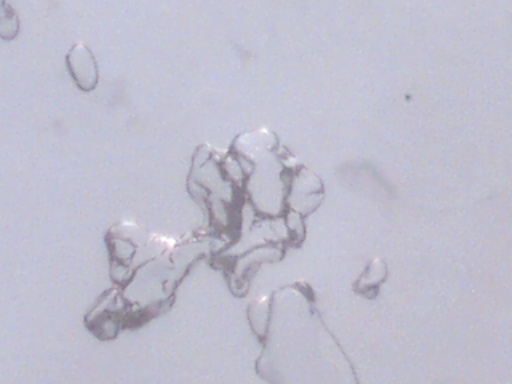
Tibicos colony under microscope (200×)

The basic preparation method is for tibicos to be added to a sugary liquid and fermented 24 to 48 hours. The water is kept at a room temperature range of 20–30 °C (70–85 °F). If the temperature is towards the upper end of this range, the fermentation period is shortened. A typical recipe might contain the tibicos culture, citrus/dried fruit, and water.

For tibicos grains to grow, a certain water buffer capacity and/or calcium concentration are required. If necessary, buffer capacity can be improved by adding some hydrogen carbonate-rich mineral water.

Some ingredients will inhibit fermentation, such as chlorine in tap water or the sulfites used to preserve dried fruit. Additional precautions are taken to keep the cultures healthy. The use of reactive metals such as aluminium, copper, or zinc are minimised. The acidity of the solution will react with the metals forming metal ions, which could be potentially damaging to the culture. Instead, plastic, lead-free ceramic, or glass containers are commonly used. It is recommended to culture grains in a glass jar and use clean plastic or silicone utensils when handling the grains.

Researchers demonstrated antimicrobial activity during tibicos fermentation, using tibicos grains to ferment different sugar sources, namely, molasses, demerara sugar, and brown sugar. Brown sugar promoted the greatest antimicrobial activities, against the microorganisms Candida albicans, Salmonella typhi, Shigella sonnei, Staphylococcus aureus and Escherichia coli.

== See also ==
- Kefir
- Kombucha
- Kvass
