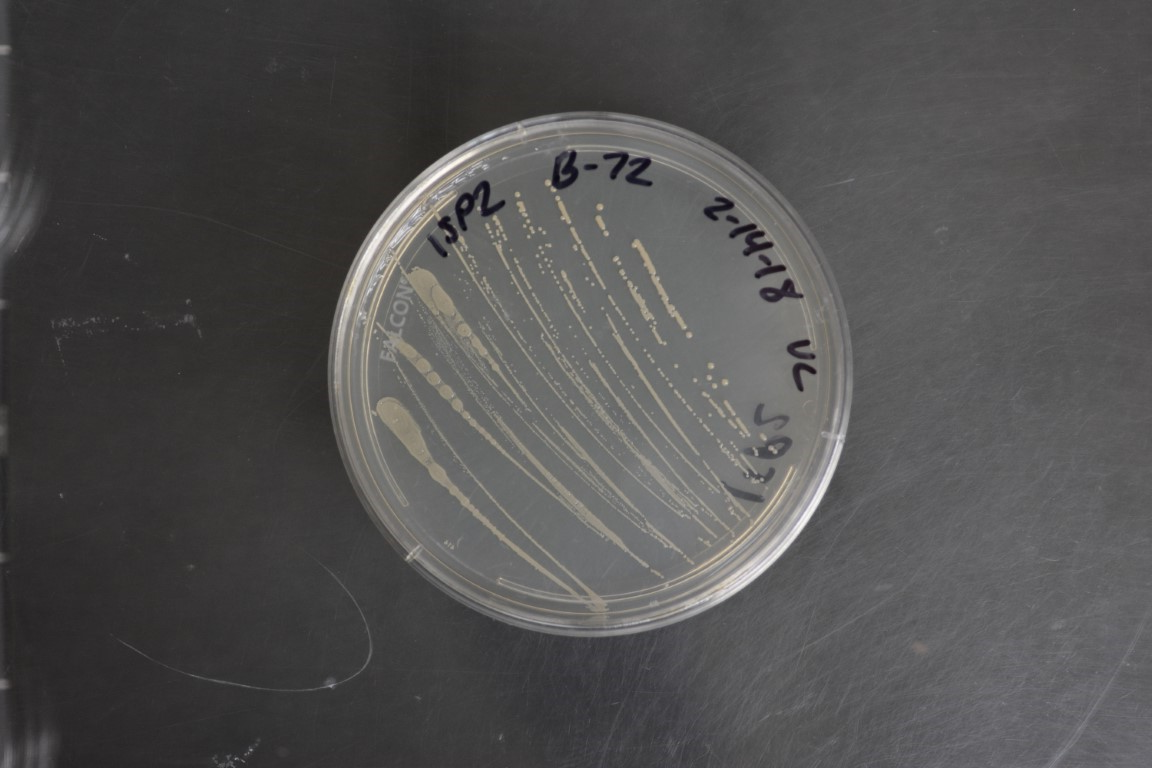
- Gluconobacter oxydans subspecies suboxydans

Scientific classification
- Domain: Bacteria
- Kingdom: Pseudomonadati
- Phylum: Pseudomonadota
- Class: Alphaproteobacteria
- Order: Rhodospirillales
- Family: Acetobacteraceae
- Genus: Gluconobacter

= Gluconobacter =

Genus of bacteria

Gluconobacter is a genus of bacteria in the acetic acid bacteria family. They prefer sugar-rich environments, so are sometimes found as a spoilage organism in beer. They are not known to be pathogenic but can cause rot in apples and pears. They are used alone or with acetobacter for microbial degradation of ethanol

== Species ==
A number of species are in the genus, such as:

- Gluconobacter albidus
- Gluconobacter asaii
- Gluconobacter cerevisiae was isolated from fermenting lambic beer in 2014 and proposed as a new species.
- Gluconobacter cerinus
- Gluconobacter frateurii
- Gluconobacter japonicus
- Gluconobacter kanchanaburiensis
- Gluconobacter kondonii
- Gluconobacter nephelii
- Gluconobacter oxydans is probably the best known, because it has a number of applications in biotechnology.
- Gluconobacter sphaericus
- Gluconobacter thailandicus
- Gluconobacter uchimurae
- Gluconobacter wancherniae
