= Acetic acid bacteria =

Group of bacteria

Acetic acid bacteria (AAB) are a group of Gram-negative bacteria that oxidize sugars or ethanol and produce acetic acid during fermentation. The acetic acid bacteria consist of 10 genera in the family Acetobacteraceae. Several species of acetic acid bacteria are used in industry for production of certain foods and chemicals.

== Description ==
All acetic acid bacteria are rod-shaped and obligate aerobes. Acetic acid bacteria are airborne and are ubiquitous in nature. They are actively present in environments where ethanol is being formed as a product of the fermentation of sugars. They can be isolated from the nectar of flowers and from damaged fruit. Other good sources are fresh apple cider and unpasteurized beer that has not been filter sterilized. In these liquids, they grow as a surface film due to their aerobic nature and active motility. Fruit flies or vinegar eels are considered common vectors in the propagation of acetic acid bacteria.

The growth of Acetobacter in wine can be suppressed through effective sanitation, by complete exclusion of air from wine in storage, and by the use of moderate amounts of sulfur dioxide in the wine as a preservative.

== Metabolism ==
Vinegar is produced when acetic acid bacteria act on alcoholic beverages such as wine. Specific oxidation reactions occur through oxidative fermentation, which creates vinegar as a byproduct. In the biotechnological industry, these bacteria's oxidation mechanism is exploited to produce a number of compounds such as l-ascorbic acid, dihydroxyacetone, gluconic acid, and cellulose. Besides food industry, some acetic acid bacteria are used as biocatalysts for the industrial production of compounds. They are used as the important biocatalysts for the development of eco-friendly fermentation processes as an alternative to the chemical synthesis. Some genera, such as Acetobacter, can oxidize ethanol to carbon dioxide and water using Krebs cycle enzymes. Other genera, such as Gluconobacter, do not oxidize ethanol, as they do not have a full set of Krebs cycle enzymes. As these bacteria produce acid, they are usually acid-tolerant, growing well below pH 5.0, although the pH optimum for growth is 5.4-6.3. Acetobacter xylinum is able to synthesize cellulose, something normally done only by plants.
