= Nata de piña =

Food produced by fermented pineapple juice

- Alternative names: Nata de pinya, pineapple gel, pineapple gelatin
- Type: Confectionery or dessert
- Place of origin: Philippines
- Region or state: Pagsanjan, Laguna
- Main ingredients: Pineapple juice
- Variations: Nata de coco

Nata de piña ("cream of pineapple" in Spanish), also marketed as pineapple gel or pineapple gelatin, is a chewy, translucent, jelly-like food produced by the fermentation of pineapple juice. It is a traditional dessert in the Philippines, produced since the 18th century using waste pineapple juices from the piña fiber industry in Pagsanjan, Laguna. It has a sweet-sour taste and is popularly used in fruit salads, jams, ice creams, candies, and various other dishes.

Nata de piña production is not as widespread as nata de coco, a variant that uses coconut water, largely because of the seasonal nature of pineapple farming. Commercially produced nata de piña is generally made from extracts of discarded pulp and pineapple skin. The gelling is the result of the production of microbial cellulose by Komagataeibacter xylinus.

== See also ==
- Macapuno
- Coconut sprout
