= Bacterial cellulose =

Organic compound

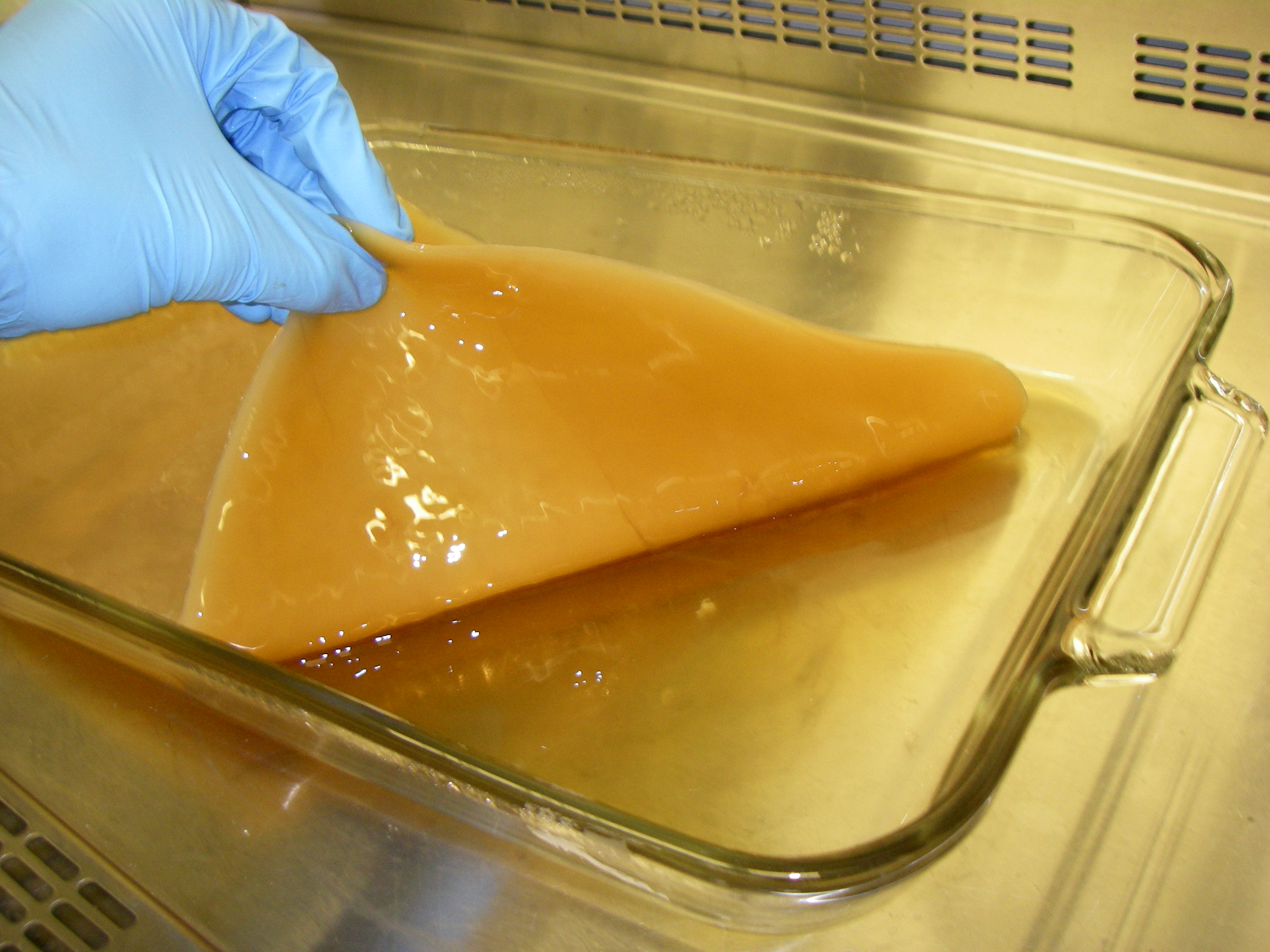
A wet microbial cellulose pellicle being removed from a culture

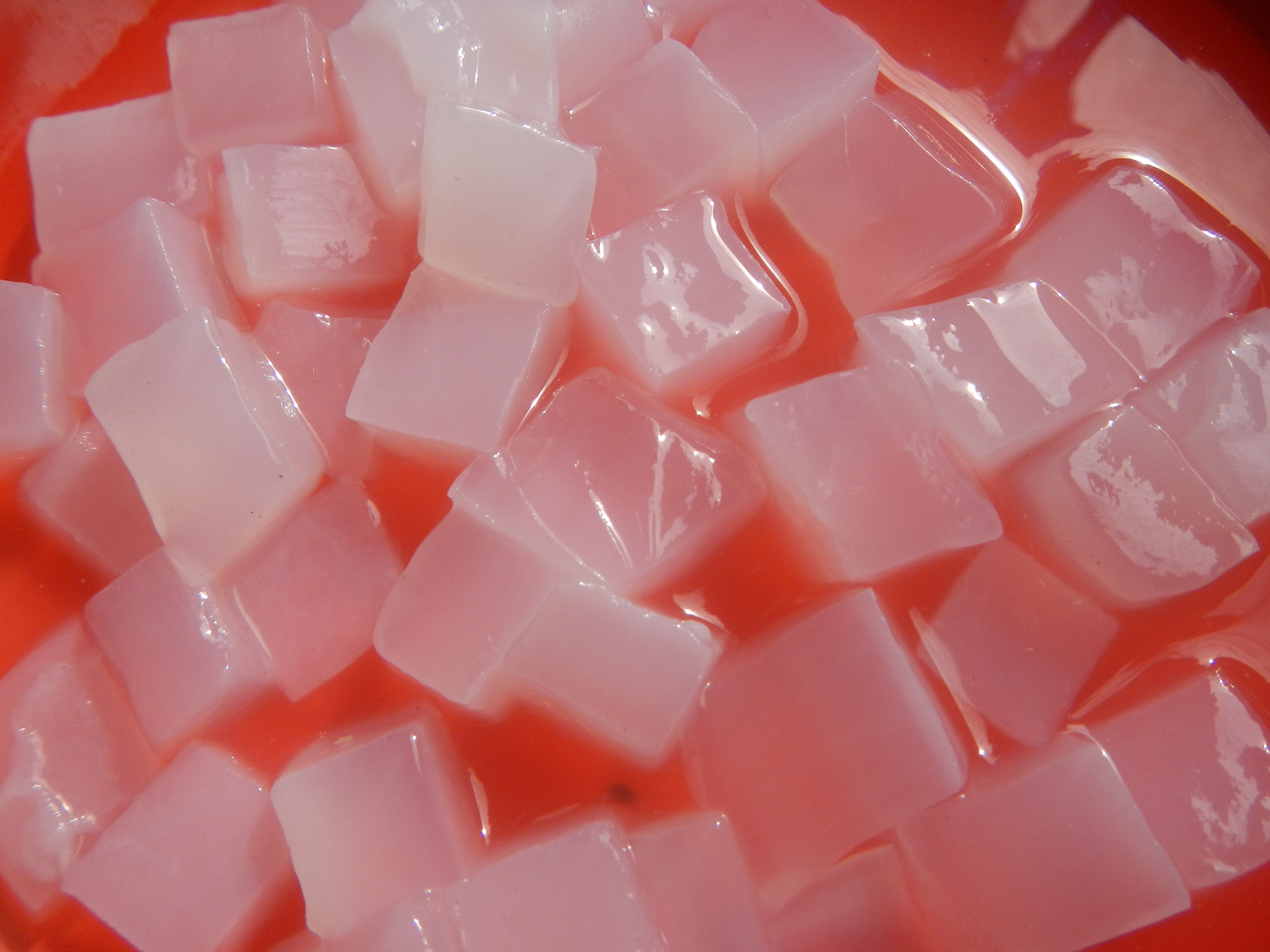
Nata de coco, a traditional food product from the Philippines made from fermenting coconut water with Komagataeibacter xylinus

Bacterial cellulose is an organic compound with the formula (C_{6}H_{10}O_{5})_{n} produced by certain types of bacteria. While cellulose is a basic structural material of most plants, it is also produced by bacteria, principally of the genera Komagataeibacter, Acetobacter, Sarcina ventriculi and Agrobacterium. Bacterial, or microbial, cellulose has different properties from plant cellulose and is characterized by high purity, strength, moldability and increased water holding ability. In natural habitats, the majority of bacteria synthesize extracellular polysaccharides, such as cellulose, which form protective envelopes around the cells. While bacterial cellulose is produced in nature, many methods are currently being investigated to enhance cellulose growth from cultures in laboratories as a large-scale process. By controlling synthesis methods, the resulting microbial cellulose can be tailored to have specific desirable properties. For example, attention has been given to the bacteria Komagataeibacter xylinus due to its cellulose's unique mechanical properties and applications to biotechnology, microbiology, and materials science.

Historically, bacterial cellulose has been limited to the manufacture of the jelly-like desserts nata de piña and nata de coco, a Filipino food product. With advances in the ability to synthesize and characterize bacterial cellulose, the material is being used for a wide variety of commercial applications including textiles, cosmetics, and food products, as well as medical applications. Many patents have been issued in microbial cellulose applications and several active areas of research are attempting to better characterize microbial cellulose and utilize it in new areas.

== History ==
As a material, cellulose was first discovered in 1838 by Anselme Payen. Payen was able to isolate the cellulose from the other plant matter and chemically characterize it. In one of its first and most common industrial applications, cellulose from wood pulp was used to manufacture paper. It is ideal for displaying information in print form due to its high reflectivity, high contrast, low cost and flexibility. The discovery of cellulose produced by bacteria, specifically from the Acetobacter xylinum, was accredited to A.J. Brown in 1886 with the synthesis of an extracellular gelatinous mat. However, it was not until the 20th century that more intensive studies on bacterial cellulose were conducted. Several decades after the initial discovery of microbial cellulose, C.A. Browne studied the cellulose material obtained by fermentation of Louisiana sugar cane juice and affirmed the results by A.J. Brown. Other researchers reported the formation of cellulose by other various organisms such as the Acetobacter pasteurianum, Acetobacter rancens, Sarcina ventriculi, and Bacterium xylinoides. In 1931, Tarr and Hibbert published the first detailed study of the formation of bacterial cellulose by conducting a series of experiments to grow A. xylinum on culture mediums.

In the mid-1900s, Hestrin et al. proved the necessity of glucose and oxygen in the synthesis of bacterial cellulose. Soon after, Colvin detected cellulose synthesis in samples containing cell-free extract of A. xylinum, glucose and ATP. In 1949, the microfibrillar structure of bacterial cellulose was characterized by Muhlethaler. Further bacterial cellulose studies have led to new uses and applications for the material.

== Biosynthesis ==
Chemical structure of cellulose

=== Bacterial sources ===
Bacteria that produce cellulose include Gram-negative bacteria species such as Acetobacter, Azotobacter, Rhizobium, Pseudomonas, Salmonella, Alcaligenes, and Gram-positive bacteria species such as Sarcina ventriculi. The most effective producers of cellulose are A. xylinum, A. hansenii, and A. pasteurianus. Of these, A. xylinum is the model microorganism for basic and applied studies on cellulose due to its ability to produce relatively high levels of polymer from a wide range of carbon and nitrogen sources.

=== General process ===
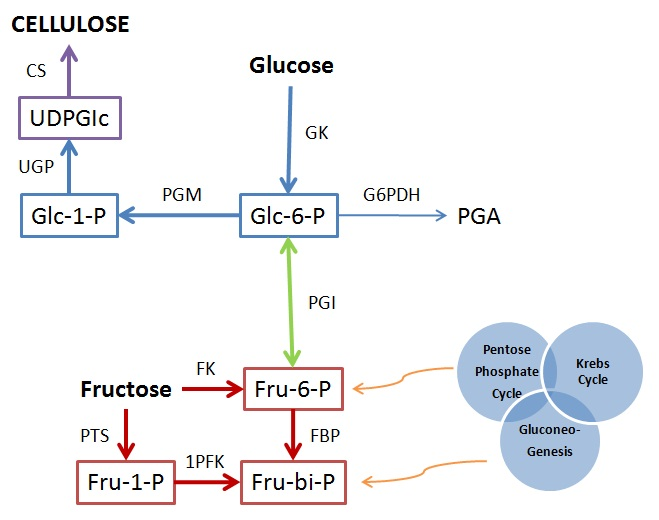
Biochemical Pathway for Cellulose Synthesis

The synthesis of bacterial cellulose is a multistep process that involve two main mechanisms: the synthesis of uridine diphosphoglucose (UDPGIc), followed by the polymerization of glucose into long and unbranched chains (the β-1→4 glucan chain) by cellulose synthase. Specifics on the cellulose synthesis has been extensively documented. The former mechanism is well known while the latter still needs exploring. The production of UDPGIc starts with carbon compounds (such as hexoses, glycerol, dihydroxyacetone, pyruvate, and dicarboxylic acids) entering the Krebs cycle, gluconeogenesis, or the pentose phosphate cycle depending on what carbon source is available. It then goes through phosphorylation along with catalysis, followed by isomerization of the intermediate, and a process known as UDPGIc pyrophosphorylase to convert the compounds into UDPGIc, a precursor to the production of cellulose. The polymerization of glucose into the β-1→4 glucan chain has been hypothesized to either involve a lipid intermediate or not to involve a lipid intermediate, though structural enzymology studies and in vitro experiments indicate that polymerization can occur by direct enzymatic transfer of a glucosyl moiety from a nucleotide sugar to the growing polysaccharide. A. xylinum usually converts carbon compounds into cellulose with around 50% efficiency.

==== Fermentation production ====
Bacterial Strains that Produce Cellulose
Microorganism	Carbon source	Supplement	Culture time (h)	Yield (g/L)
A. xylinum BRCS	glucose	ethanol, oxygen	50	15.30
G. hansenii PJK (KCTC 10505 BP)	glucose	oxygen	48	1.72
G. hansenii PJK (KCTC 10505 BP)	glucose	ethanol	72	2.50
Acetobacter sp. V6	glucose	ethanol	192	4.16
Acetobacter sp. A9	glucose	ethanol	192	15.20
A. xylinum ssp. Sucrofermentans BPR2001	molasses	none	72	7.82
A. xylinum ssp. Sucrofermentans BPR2001	fructose	agar oxygen	72	14.10
A. xylinum ssp. Sucrofermentans BPR2001	fructose	agar	56	12.00
A. xylinum ssp. Sucrofermentans BPR2001	fructose	oxygen	52	10.40
A. xylinum ssp. Sucrofermentans BPR2001	fructose	agar oxygen	44	8.70
A. xylinum E25	glucose	no	168	3.50
G. xylinus K3	mannitol	green tea	168	3.34
G. xylinus IFO 13773	glucose	lignosulphonate	168	10.10
A. xylinum NUST4.1	glucose	sodium alginate	120	6.00
G. xylinus IFO 13773	sugar cane molasses	no	168	5.76
G. xylinus sp. RKY5	glycerol	no	144	5.63
Gluconacetobacter sp. St-60-12 and Lactobacillus Mali JCM1116 (co-culture)	sucrose	no	72	4.20

Cellulose production depends heavily on several factors such as the growth medium, environmental conditions, and the formation of byproducts. The fermentation medium contains carbon, nitrogen, and other macro and micro nutrients required for bacteria growth. Bacteria are most efficient when supplied with an abundant carbon source and minimal nitrogen source. Glucose and sucrose are the most commonly used carbon sources for cellulose production, while fructose, maltose, xylose, starch, and glycerol have been tried. Sometimes, ethanol may be used to increase cellulose production. The problem with using glucose is that gluconic acid is formed as a byproduct which decreases the pH of the culture and in turn, decreases the production of cellulose. Studies have shown that gluconic acid production can be decreased in the presence of lignosulfonate. Addition of organic acids, specifically acetic acid, also helped in a higher yield of cellulose. Studies of using molasses medium in a jar fermentor as well as added components of sugarcane molasses on certain strains of bacteria have been studied with results showing increases in cellulose production.

Addition of extra nitrogen generally decreases cellulose production while addition of precursor molecules such as amino acids and methionine improved yield. Pyridoxine, nicotinic acid, p-aminobenzoic acid and biotin are vitamins important for cellulose production whereas pantothenate and riboflavin have opposing effects. In reactors where the process is more complex, water-soluble polysaccharides such as agar, acetan, and sodium alginate are added to prevent clumping or coagulation of bacterial cellulose.

The other main environmental factors affecting cellulose production are pH, temperature, and dissolved oxygen. According to experimental studies, the optimal temperature for maximum production was between 28 and 30 °C. For most species, the optimal pH was between 4.0 and 6.0. Controlling pH is especially important in static cultures as the accumulation of gluconic, acetic, or lactic acid decreases the pH far lower than the optimal range. Dissolved oxygen content can be varied with stirrer speed as it is needed for static cultures where substrates need to be transported by diffusion.

==== Reactor based production ====
Static and agitated cultures are conventional ways to produce bacterial cellulose. Both static and agitated cultures are not feasible for large-scale production as static cultures have a long culture period as well as intensive manpower and agitated cultures produce cellulose-negative mutants alongside its reactions due to rapid growth. Thus, reactors are designed to lessen culture time and inhibit the conversion of bacterial cellulose-producing strains into cellulose-negative mutants. Common reactors used are the rotating disk reactor, the rotary biofilm contactor (RBC), a bioreactor equipped with a spin filter, and a reactor with a silicone membrane.

== Structure and properties ==
Types of cellulose
Genus	Cellulose type	Biological role
Acetobacter	Extracellular pellicle, ribbons	Maintain aerobic environment
Achromobacter	Ribbons	Flocculation
Aerobacter	Fibrils	Flocculation
Agrobacterium	Short fibrils	Attachment to plants
Alcaligenes	Fibrils	Flocculation
Pseudomonas	Non-distinct	Flocculation
Rhozobium	Short fibrils	Attachment to plants
Sarcina	Amorphous	Unknown

=== Differences between plant and bacterial cellulose ===
As the Earth's most common organic material, cellulose can be classified into plant cellulose and bacterial cellulose, both of which are naturally occurring. Plant cellulose, which makes up the cell walls of most plants, is a tough, mesh-like bulkwork in which cellulose fibrils are the primary architectural elements. While bacterial cellulose has the same molecular formula as plant cellulose, it has significantly different macromolecular properties and characteristics. In general, microbial cellulose is more chemically pure, containing no hemicellulose or lignin, has a higher water holding capacity and hydrophilicity, greater tensile strength resulting from a larger amount of polymerization, ultrafine network architecture. Furthermore, bacterial cellulose can be produced on a variety of substrates and can be grown to virtually any shape due to the high moldability during formation. Additionally, bacterial cellulose has a more crystalline structure compared to plant cellulose and forms characteristic ribbon-like microfibrils. A hallmark of microbial cellulose, these thin microfibrils are significantly smaller than those in plant cellulose, making bacterial cellulose much more porous.

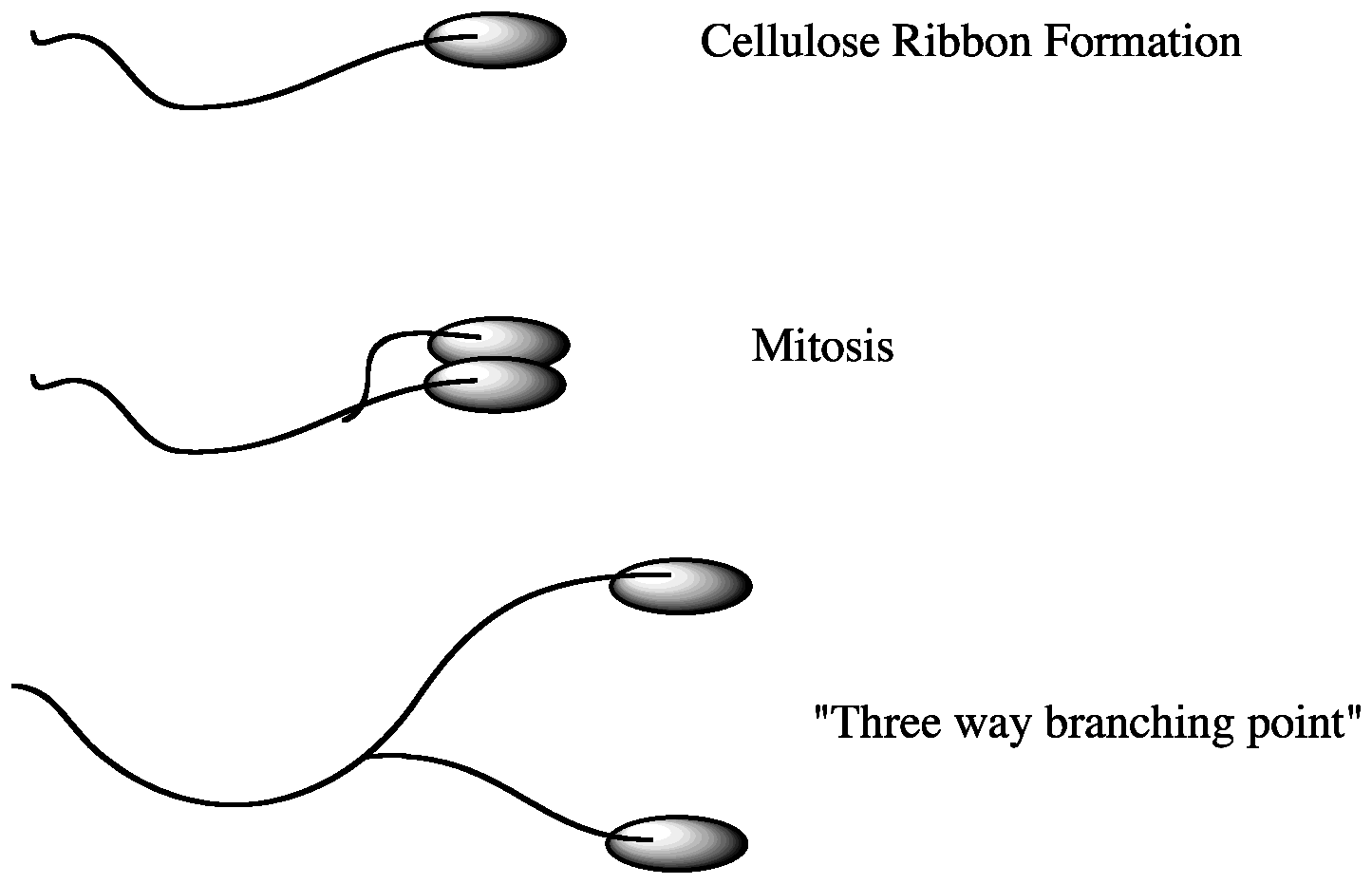
Three way branching point mechanism

=== Macro structure ===
Cellulose is composed of carbon, oxygen, and hydrogen, and is classified as a polysaccharide, indicating it is a carbohydrate that exhibits polymeric characteristics. Cellulose is composed of straight chain polymers, whose base units of glucose are held together by beta-linkages. The structural role of cellulose in cell walls has been likened to that of the glass strands of fiberglass or to the supporting rods within reinforced concrete. Cellulose fibrils are highly insoluble and inelastic and, because of their molecular configuration, have a tensile strength comparable to that of steel. Consequently, cellulose imparts a unique combination of chemical resilience and mechanical support and flexibility to the tissues in which it resides. Bacterial cellulose, produced by Acetobacter species, displays unique properties, including high mechanical strength, high water absorption capacity, high crystallinity, and an ultra-fine and highly pure fiber network structure. One of the most important features of bacterial cellulose is its chemical purity. In addition to this, bacterial cellulose is stable towards chemicals and at high temperatures. Bacterial cellulose has been suggested to have a construction like a ‘cage' which protects the cell from foreign material and heavy-metal ions, while still allowing nutrients to be supplied easily by diffusion. Bacterial cellulose was described by Louis Pasteur as "a sort of moist skin, swollen, gelatinous and slippery." Although the solid portion in the gel is less than one percent, it is almost pure cellulose containing no lignin and other foreign substances. Although bacterial cellulose is obtained in the form of a highly swollen gel, the texture is quite unique and different from typical gels. Cellulose has a high swollen fiber network resulting from the presence of pore structures and tunnels within the wet pellicle. Plant cellulose water retention values 60%, while bacterial cellulose has a water retention value of 1000%. The formation of the cellulose pellicle occurs on the upper surface of the supernatant film. A large surface area is important for a good productivity. The cellulose formation occurs at the air/cellulose pellicle interface and not at the medium/cellulose interface. Thus oxygen is an important factor for cellulose production. After an inducing and a rapid growth period, the thickness increases steadily. Fibrils appear to be not necessarily linear but contain some "three-way branching points" along their length. This type of branching is considered to be related to the unique characteristics of this material and occurs from branching points produced by binary fission.

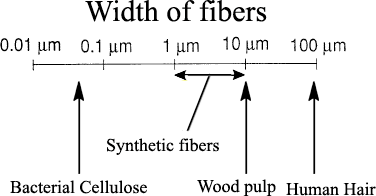
Sizes of synthetic and naturally occurring fibers

=== Properties and characterization ===
Sheet-shaped material prepared from bacterial cellulose has remarkable mechanical properties. According to Brown, the pellicle of bacterial cellulose was "very tough, especially if an attempt was made to tear it across its plane of growth". The Young's modulus for bacterial cellulose has been reported to be as high as 15 GPa across the plane of the sheet, whereas the highest values attained in the past by polymeric films or sheets is < 10GPa at most. The sheet's high Young's modulus has been attributed to the unique super-molecular structure in which fibrils of biological origin are preserved and bound tightly by hydrogen bonds. This Young's modulus does not vary with temperature nor the cultivation process used. The very high Young's modulus of this material must be ascribed to its super-molecular structure.

This property arises from adjacently aligned glucan chains participating in inter- and intrachain hydrogen bonding. Bacterial cellulose subfibrils are crystallized into microfibrils which group to form bundles, that then form 'ribbons'. These fibers are two orders of magnitude thinner than cellulose fibers produced by pulping wood. Today, it is known that the pellicle comprises a random assembly of fibrils (< 130 nm wide), which are composed of a bundle of much finer microfibrils (2 to 4 nm diameter). It is also known that the pellicle gives a film or sheet when dried if the shrinkage across the plane is restricted. The ultrafine ribbons of microbial cellulose form a dense reticulated structure, stabilized by extensive hydrogen bonding. Bacterial cellulose is also distinguished from its plant counterpart by a high crystallinity index (above 60%). Two common crystalline forms of cellulose, designated as I and II, are distinguishable by X-ray, nuclear magnetic resonance (NMR), Raman spectroscopy, and infrared analysis. Bacterial cellulose belongs crystallographically to Cellulose I, common with natural cellulose of vegetable origin, in which two cellulose units are arranged parallel in a unit cell. The term Cellulose I is used for this parallel arrangement, whereas crystalline fibrils bearing antiparallel polyglucan chains arise forming the thermodynamically stable Cellulose II. The molecular arrangement in the sheet, confirmed by X-ray diffraction, was such that the molecular chain axis lay randomly perpendicular to the thickness such that the (1 1 0) plane was oriented parallel to the surface.

Although cellulose forms a distinct crystalline structure, cellulose fibers in nature are not purely crystalline. In addition to the crystalline and amorphous regions, cellulose fibers contain various types of irregularities, such as kinks or twists of the microfibrils, or voids such as surface micropores, large pits, and capillaries. Thus, the total surface area of a cellulose fiber is much greater than the surface area of an ideally smooth fiber of the same dimension. The net effect of structural heterogeneity within the fiber is that the fibers are at least partially hydrated by water when immersed in aqueous media, and some micropores and capillaries are sufficiently spacious to permit penetration.

Scanning electron microscopy of a fractured edge has revealed a pile of very thin layers. It is suggested that these fibrils in layers are bound through interfibrillar hydrogen bonds, just as in pulp-papers, but the density of the interfibrillar hydrogen bonds must be much higher as the fibrils are finer, hence the contact area is larger.

== Applications ==
Bacterial cellulose has a wide variety of current and potential future applications. Due to its many unique properties, it has been used in the food industry, the medical field, commercial and industrial products, and other technical areas. Bacterial cellulose is a versatile structural material, allowing it to be shaped in a variety of ways to accommodate different uses. A number of patents have been issued for processes involving this material. Bacterial cellulose pellicles were proposed as a temporary skin substitute in case of human burns and other dermal injuries.

=== Food ===
The oldest known use of bacterial cellulose is as the raw material of nata de piña, a traditional sweet candy dessert of the Philippines. Several natural colored pigments (oxycarotenoids, anthocyanins and related antioxidants and free radical scavengers) were incorporated into bacterial cellulose cubes in order to render the dessert more attractive. Bacterial cellulose has also been used as a thickener to maintain the viscosity in food and as a stabilizing agent. Due to its texture and fiber content, it has been added to many food products as a dietary fiber. It can be used as a bulking agent for thickening and to reduce calories. Microbial cellulose has also been used as an additive in diet beverages in Japan since 1992, specifically kombucha, a fermented tea drink.

=== Commercial products ===
Bacterial cellulose also has wide applications in commercial industries. In papermaking, it is used as an ultra-strength paper and as a reticulated fine fibre network with coating, binding, thickening and suspending characteristics. Due to its high sonic velocity and low dynamic loss, bacterial cellulose has been used as an acoustic or filter membrane in hi-fidelity loudspeakers and headphones as marketed by the Sony Corporation. Bacterial cellulose is also used as an additive in the cosmetic industry. Furthermore, it is being tested in the textile industry, with the possibility of manufacturing cellulose based clothing.

=== Medical ===
In more modern applications, microbial cellulose has become relevant in the medical sector. It has been tested and successfully used as a wound dressing, especially in burn cases. Studies have shown that burns treated with microbial cellulose coverings healed faster than traditional treatments and had less scarring. The microbial cellulose topical applications are effective due to the cellulose's water holding ability and water vapor permeability. The high water holding ability provides a moist atmosphere at the injury site, which is critical in healing, while the wicking ability allows seepage from the wound to be removed from the site. Also, the microbial cellulose molds very well to the surface of the skin, providing a conformal covering even in usually difficult places to dress wounds, such as areas on the face. This technique has been so successful that commercial microbial cellulose products, such as Biofill®, have been developed. Another microbial cellulose commercial treatment product is XCell produced by the Xylos Corporation, which is mainly used to treat wounds from venous ulcers. Studies have also been performed where traditional gauze dressings are treated with a microbial cellulose biopolymer to enhance the properties of the gauze. In addition to increasing the drying time and water holding abilities, liquid medicines were able to be absorbed by the microbial cellulose coated gauze, allowing them to work at the injury site.

Microbial cellulose has also been used for internal treatments, such as bone grafts and other tissue engineering and regeneration. A key ability of microbial cellulose for medical applications is that it can easily be molded into various shapes while still retaining all of its useful properties. By molding microbial cellulose into long, hollow tubes, they can be used as replacement structures for several different areas, such as the cardiovascular system, the digestive tract, urinary tract, or the trachea. A recent application of microbial cellulose has been as synthetic blood vessels and stents. The cellulose can also be modeled into mesh membranes that can be used for internal replacement structures, such as the brain's outer membrane, the dura mater. In addition to replacement, these structures have also been used as grafts to interact with existing internal biological material. Microbial cellulose has also been used in guided tissue regeneration. Bioprocess® and Gengiflex® are some of the common trademarked products of microbial cellulose that now have wide applications in surgery and dental implants. One example involves the recovery of periodontal tissues by separating oral epithelial cells and gingival connective tissues from the treated root surface.

=== Current research/future applications ===
An area of active research on microbial cellulose is in the area of electronic paper. Currently, plant cellulose is used to produce the bulk of traditional paper, but due to its low purity it must be mixed with other substances. However, due to microbial cellulose's higher purity and microfibril structure, it may prove to be an excellent candidate for an electronic paper substrate. Microbial cellulose can be fashioned into sheets approximately 100 micrometers thick, about the thickness of normal paper, by a wet synthesis process. The microbial cellulose produces a sturdy substrate with a microfibril structure that allows the paper to be implanted with dopants. Through the application of solutions to the microbial cellulose paper, conductive dopants and electrochromic dyes can be placed into the microfibril structure. The bistable dyes change from clear to dark upon the application of the appropriate voltages, which when placed in a pixel structure, would allow images to be formed. This technology is still in the research stage and has not yet been scaled to commercial production levels. Further research has been done to apply bacterial cellulose as a substrate in electronic devices with the potential to be used as e-book tablets, e-newspapers, dynamic wall papers, rewritable maps and learning tools. Another possible example of bacterial cellulose use in the electronics industry includes the manufacture of organic light-emitting diodes (OLEDs).

=== Challenges/limitations ===
Due to the inefficient production process, the current price of bacterial cellulose remains too high to make it commercially attractive and viable on a large scale. Traditional production methods cannot produce microbial cellulose in commercial quantities, so further advancements with reactor based production must be achieved to be able to market many microbial cellulose products.

== See also ==
- Carrageenan
- Materials science
- Microbiology
- Biotechnology
