= Sarcina ventriculi =

Scientific classification
- Domain: Bacteria
- Kingdom: Bacillati
- Phylum: Bacillota
- Class: Clostridia
- Order: Eubacteriales
- Family: Clostridiaceae
- Genus: Sarcina
- Species: S. ventriculi

Binomial name
- Sarcina ventriculi Goodsir 1842

Synonyms
- Clostridium ventriculi; Zymosarcina ventriculi

Species of bacterium

Sarcina ventriculi is a bacterial species in the Clostridiaceae family. Phylogenetics have placed S. ventriculi and Sarcina maxima within the genus Clostridium. It has been proposed to be renamed to Clostridium ventriculi in 2016, but ultimately retained its name due to the genus name of Sarcina taking priority over Clostridium.
