= D-Man-alpha-(1-3)-D-Glc-beta-(1-4)-D-Glc-alpha-1-diphosphoundecaprenol 2-beta-glucuronyltransferase =

Class of enzymes

D-Man-alpha-(1->3)-D-Glc-beta-(1->4)-D-Glc-alpha-1-diphosphoundecaprenol 2-beta-glucuronyltransferase

Identifiers
- EC no.: 2.4.1.264

Databases
- IntEnz: IntEnz view
- BRENDA: BRENDA entry
- ExPASy: NiceZyme view
- KEGG: KEGG entry
- MetaCyc: metabolic pathway
- PRIAM: profile
- PDB structures: RCSB PDB PDBe PDBsum
Search
- PMC: articles
- PubMed: articles
- NCBI: proteins

D-Man-alpha-(1->3) -D-Glc-beta-(1->4) -D-Glc-alpha-1-diphosphoundecaprenol 2-beta-glucuronyltransferase (EC 2.4.1.264, GumK) is an enzyme with the systematic name UDP-glucuronate: D-Man-alpha-(1->3) -D-Glc-beta-(1->4)-D-Glc-alpha-1-diphospho-ditrans,octacis-undecaprenol beta-1,2-glucuronyltransferase. This enzyme catalyses the following chemical reaction:

UDP-glucuronate + D-Man-alpha-(1->3) -D-Glc-beta-(1->4) -D-Glc-alpha-1-diphospho-ditrans,octacis-undecaprenol $\rightleftharpoons$ UDP + D-GlcA-beta-(1->2) -D-Man-alpha-(1->3) -D-Glc-beta-(1->4) -D-Glc-alpha-1-diphospho-ditrans,octacis-undecaprenol

The enzyme is involved in the biosynthesis of the exopolysaccharides xanthan (in the bacterium Xanthomonas campestris) and acetan (in the bacterium Gluconacetobacter xylinus).
