= Coconut jelly =

Coconut jelly may refer to:

- Young coconut meat
- Nata de coco, or "coconut gel", a chewy, translucent, jelly-like food product produced by the bacterial fermentation of coconut water
