= Cyclic-guanylate-specific phosphodiesterase =

Identifiers
- EC no.: 3.1.4.52
- CAS no.: 338732-46-0

Databases
- BRENDA: enzyme data
- ExPASy: NiceZyme view
- KEGG: enzyme entry
- MetaCyc: metabolic pathway
- Rhea: reactions
- PDB structures: RCSB PDB PDBe PDBsum
Search
- PMC: articles
- PubMed: articles
- NCBI: proteins

Cyclic-guanylate-specific phosphodiesterase (EC 3.1.4.52, cyclic bis(3′→5')diguanylate phosphodiesterase, c-di-GMP-specific phosphodiesterase, c-di-GMP phosphodiesterase, phosphodiesterase, phosphodiesterase A1, PDEA1, VieA) is an enzyme with systematic name cyclic bis(3′→5′)diguanylate 3-guanylylhydrolase. It catalyses the following reaction:

cyclic di-GMP
H_{2}O
pGpG

The enzyme characterised from Acetobacter xylinum hydrolyses the second messenger, cyclic di-GMP, to 5′-phosphoguanylyl(3′→5′)guanosine (pGpG). It contains heme and requires Mg^{2+} or Mn^{2+} for activity; it is inhibited by Ca^{2+} and Zn^{2+}. This reaction regulates how bacteria switch between their free living and biofilm modes of growth.
