= Komagataeibacter hansenii =

Scientific classification
- Domain: Bacteria
- Kingdom: Pseudomonadati
- Phylum: Pseudomonadota
- Class: Alphaproteobacteria
- Order: Rhodospirillales
- Family: Acetobacteraceae
- Genus: Komagataeibacter
- Species: K. hansenii

Binomial name
- Komagataeibacter hansenii (Gosselé et al. 1983) Yamada et al. 2013

Synonyms
- Gluconoacetobacter hansenii (Gosselé et al. 1983) Yamada et al. 1998; Gluconacetobacter hansenii corrig. (Gosselé et al. 1983) Yamada et al. 1998; Acetobacter hansenii Gosselé et al. 1983; "Komagatabacter hansenii" (Gosselé et al. 1983) Yamada et al. 2012

Species of bacterium

Komagataeibacter hansenii is a species of acetic acid bacteria, notable as the model organism for the biosynthesis of bacterial cellulose. For instance, it has been demonstrated that one can produce bacterial cellulose using waste beer yeast as nutrient source.
