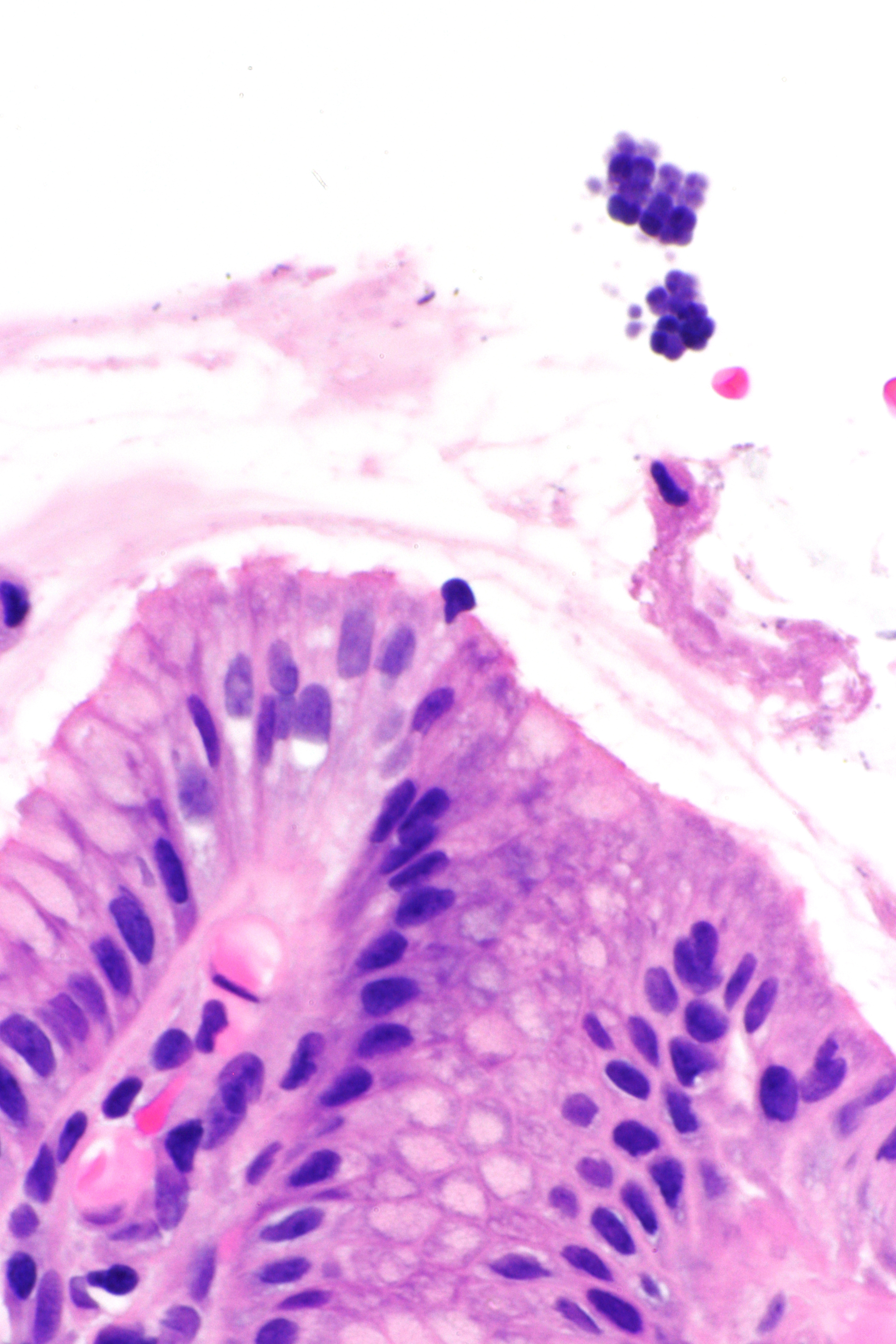
- Gastric mucosa and Sarcina on upper right. H&E stain.

Scientific classification
- Domain: Bacteria
- Kingdom: Bacillati
- Phylum: Bacillota
- Class: Clostridia
- Order: Eubacteriales
- Family: Clostridiaceae
- Genus: Sarcina; Goodsir, 1842

Type species
- Sarcina ventriculi Goodsir, 1842

Species
- S. maxima; "S. troglodytae"; S. ventriculi

Synonyms
- "Butyrisarcina" Kluyver & Van Niel 1936; "Urosarcina" (Miquel 1888) Miquel 1893; "Welchia" Pribram 1929 ex Prévot 1933; "Welchillus" Heller 1922; "Zymosarcina" Smit 1930

= Sarcina (bacterium) =

Genus of bacteria

Sarcina is a genus of gram-positive cocci bacteria in the family Clostridiaceae. A synthesizer of microbial cellulose, various members of the genus are human flora and may be found in the skin and large intestine. The genus takes its name from the Latin word "sarcina," meaning pack or bundle, after the cuboidal (2x2x2) cellular associations they form during division along three planes.

The genus's type species is Sarcina ventriculi, a variety found on the surface of cereal seeds, in soil, mud, and in the stomachs of humans, rabbits, and guinea pigs.

== Phylogeny ==
The currently accepted taxonomy is based on the List of Prokaryotic names with Standing in Nomenclature (LPSN) and National Center for Biotechnology Information (NCBI)

16S rRNA based LTP_10_2024

- - Clostridium tarantellae
  - - Clostridium perfringens
    - - Sarcina
        - S. maxima Lindner 1888
        - S. ventriculi

120 marker proteins based GTDB 09-RS220

- Sarcina
  - - Clostridium tarantellae (Udey, Young & Sallman 1977) Lawson & Rainey 2016
    - S. ventriculi Goodsir 1842
  - - Clostridium perfringens (Veillon & Zuber 1898) Holland 1920 ex Hauduroy et al. 1937
    - - "Clostridium massiliamazoniense" Dione et al. 2020
      - "Clostridium mediterraneense" Ndongo et al. 2017

== Species ==
- Sarcina aurantiaca
- Sarcina lutea has been reclassified to Micrococcus luteus
- Sarcina troglodytae is a chimpanzee pathogen

== See also ==
- List of bacterial orders
- List of bacteria genera
