= Haustorium =

Biological root-like structure that extracts nutrients from another organism

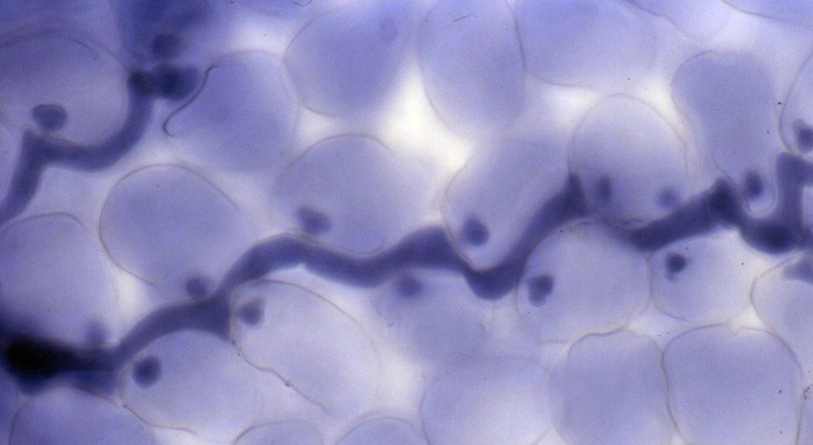
Hyaloperonospora parasitica: hyphae and haustoria

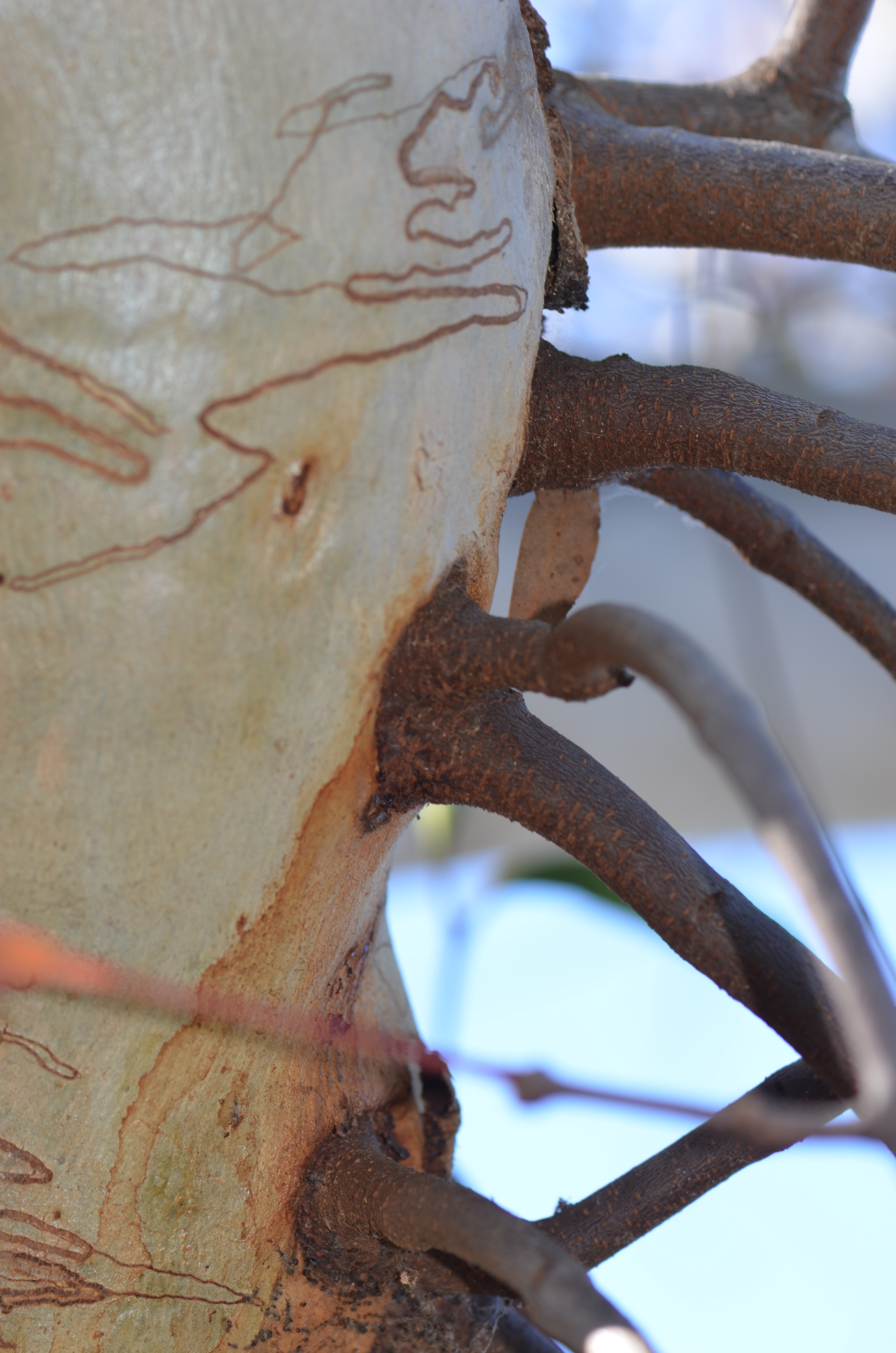
Haustoria of creeping mistletoe in a scribbly gum

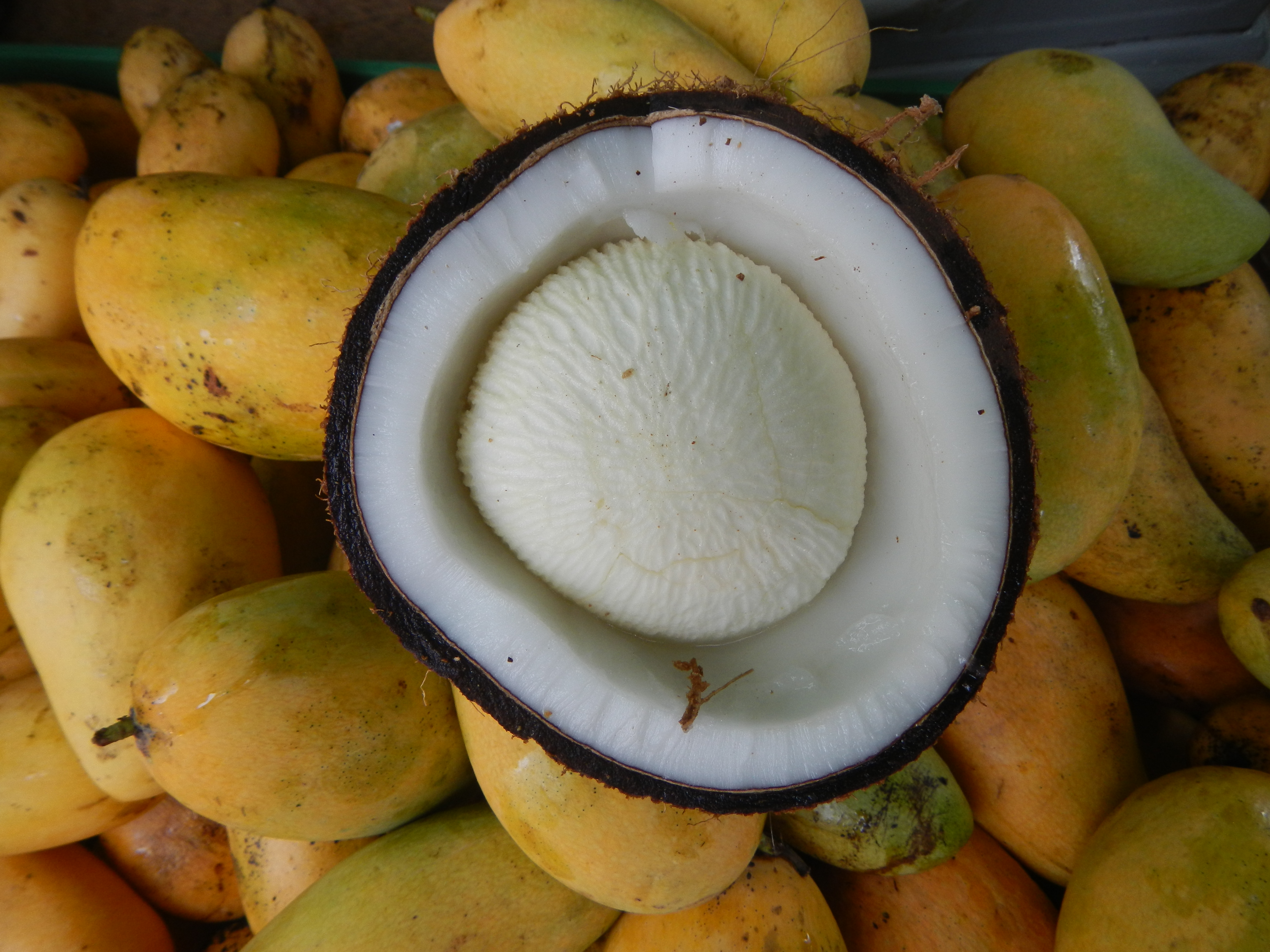
A coconut sprout, the edible haustorium of germinating coconut seeds

In botany and mycology, a haustorium (plural haustoria) is a rootlike structure that grows into or around another structure to absorb water or nutrients. For example, in mistletoe or members of the broomrape family, the structure penetrates the host's tissue and draws nutrients from it. In mycology, it refers to the appendage or portion of a parasitic fungus (the hyphal tip), which performs a similar function. Microscopic haustoria penetrate the host plant's cell wall and siphon nutrients from the space between the cell wall and plasma membrane but do not penetrate the membrane itself. Larger (usually botanical, not fungal) haustoria do this at the tissue level.

The etymology of the name corresponds to the Latin word haustor meaning the one who draws, drains or drinks, and refers to the action performed by the outgrowth.

== In fungi ==
Fungi in all major divisions form haustoria. Haustoria take several forms. Generally, on penetration, the fungus increases the surface area in contact with host plasma membrane releasing enzymes that break up the cell walls, enabling greater potential movement of organic carbon from host to fungus. Thus, an insect hosting a parasitic fungus such as Cordyceps may look as though it is being "eaten from the inside out" as the haustoria expand inside of it.

The simplest forms of haustoria are small spheres. The largest are complex formations adding significant mass to a cell, expanding between the cell wall and cell membrane. In the Chytridiomycota, the entire fungus may become enclosed in the cell, and it is arguable whether this should be considered analogous to a haustorium.

Haustoria arise from intercellular hyphae, appressoria, or external hyphae. The hypha narrows as it passes through the cell wall and then expands on invaginating the cell. A thickened, electron-dense collar of material is deposited around the hypha at the point of invagination. Further, the host cell wall becomes highly modified in the invaginated zone. Inclusions normally present in plasma membrane are absent, and the outer layer contains more polysaccharide. The wall of both partners is severely reduced.

Functional exchange takes place within the haustorial complex. The host supplies organic carbon to the fungus, and the metabolic activity within the complex is considerably greater than outside. Carbon from the host is absorbed by the fungus, and transported to the rest of the thallus. The host plant appears to be functioning according to signals from the fungus and the complex appears to be under the control of the invader.

The haustorium may be mycelium or root-shaped.

== In plants ==
Mistletoes (including Loranthaceae and Viscaceae) and broomrapes (Orobanchaceae) attach to their hosts via a haustorium. The haustoria attacks the host's xylem and/or phloem and attaches itself to the host. This structure both anchors the parasitic plant, and allows it to tap into the host plant. These parasitic plants use passive mechanisms to draw water from their hosts. Mistletoes keep their leaf stomata open night and day which sets up a moisture gradient between the plant and host.

A second meaning of 'haustorium' in botany is to describe tissues in a developing plant embryo that transfer nutrients from the seed's endosperm to the embryo. These tissues are found widely in the seeds of flowering plants.

== See also ==
- Appressorium

== Bibliography ==
- P.M. Kirk; P.F. Cannon; D.W. Minter; J.A. Stalpers (30 November 2008). Dictionary of the Fungi. CABI. p. 306. ISBN 978-0-85199-826-8.
- Lersten, Nels R. (2004). Flowering plant embryology with emphasis on economic species. Ames, Iowa: Blackwell Pub. ISBN 9780470752678.
- ANBG: What is mistletoe Accessed 22 January 2018.
- ANBG: Haustoria Accessed 22 January 2018.
