= Komagataeibacter xylinus =

Scientific classification
- Domain: Bacteria
- Kingdom: Pseudomonadati
- Phylum: Pseudomonadota
- Class: Alphaproteobacteria
- Order: Rhodospirillales
- Family: Acetobacteraceae
- Genus: Komagataeibacter
- Species: K. x. (pioquid)

Binomial name
- Komagataeibacter xylinus (pioquid) (Brown 1886) Yamada et al. 2013

Synonyms
- "Bacterium xylinum" Brown 1886; Gluconoacetobacter xylinus (Brown 1886) Yamada et al 1998; Gluconacetobacter xylinus corrig. (Brown 1886) Yamada et al. 1998; Acetobacter xylinus corrig. (Brown 1886) Yamada 1984; Acetobacter aceti subsp. xylinum (Brown 1886) De Ley and Frateur 1974 (Approved Lists 1980); Acetobacter xylinum (Brown 1886) Yamada 1984; Acetobacter aceti subsp. xylinus corrig. (Brown 1886) De Ley and Frateur 1974 (Approved Lists 1980; "Komagatabacter xylinus" (Brown 1886) Yamada et al. 2012

Species of Alphaproteobacteria

Komagataeibacter xylinus is a species of bacteria best known for its ability to produce cellulose, specifically bacterial cellulose.

== History and taxonomy ==
The species was first described in 1886 by Adrian John Brown, who identified the bacteria while studying fermentation. Brown gave the species the name Bacterium xylinum. It has since been known by several other names, mainly Acetobacter xylinum and Gluconacetobacter xylinus. It was given its current name, with the establishment of the new genus Komagataeibacter, in 2012. It is the type species of the genus.

== Genome and metabolism ==
K. xylinus is a member of the acetic acid bacteria, a group of Gram-negative aerobic bacteria that produce acetic acid during fermentation. K. xylinus is unusual among the group in also producing cellulose. Bacterial cellulose (also sometimes known as nanocellulose) is involved in the formation of biofilms. It is chemically identical to plant cellulose, but has distinct physical structure and properties.

The genome of a cellulose-deficient strain of K. xylinus was sequenced in 2011, and followed by the genomes of cellulose-producing strains in 2014 and 2018. The first cellulose-producing strain had a genome consisting of one chromosome 3.4 megabase pairs and five plasmids, of which one is a "megaplasmid" of about 330 kilobase pairs.

Key genes related to cellulose production occur in the four-gene operon bcsABCD, which codes for the four subunits of the cellulose synthase enzyme. All four genes are required for efficient cellulose production in vivo, although BcsA and BscB are sufficient in vitro. Several other genes in the K. xylinus genome are also involved in cellulose production and regulation, including a cellulase enzyme.

== Uses and significance ==
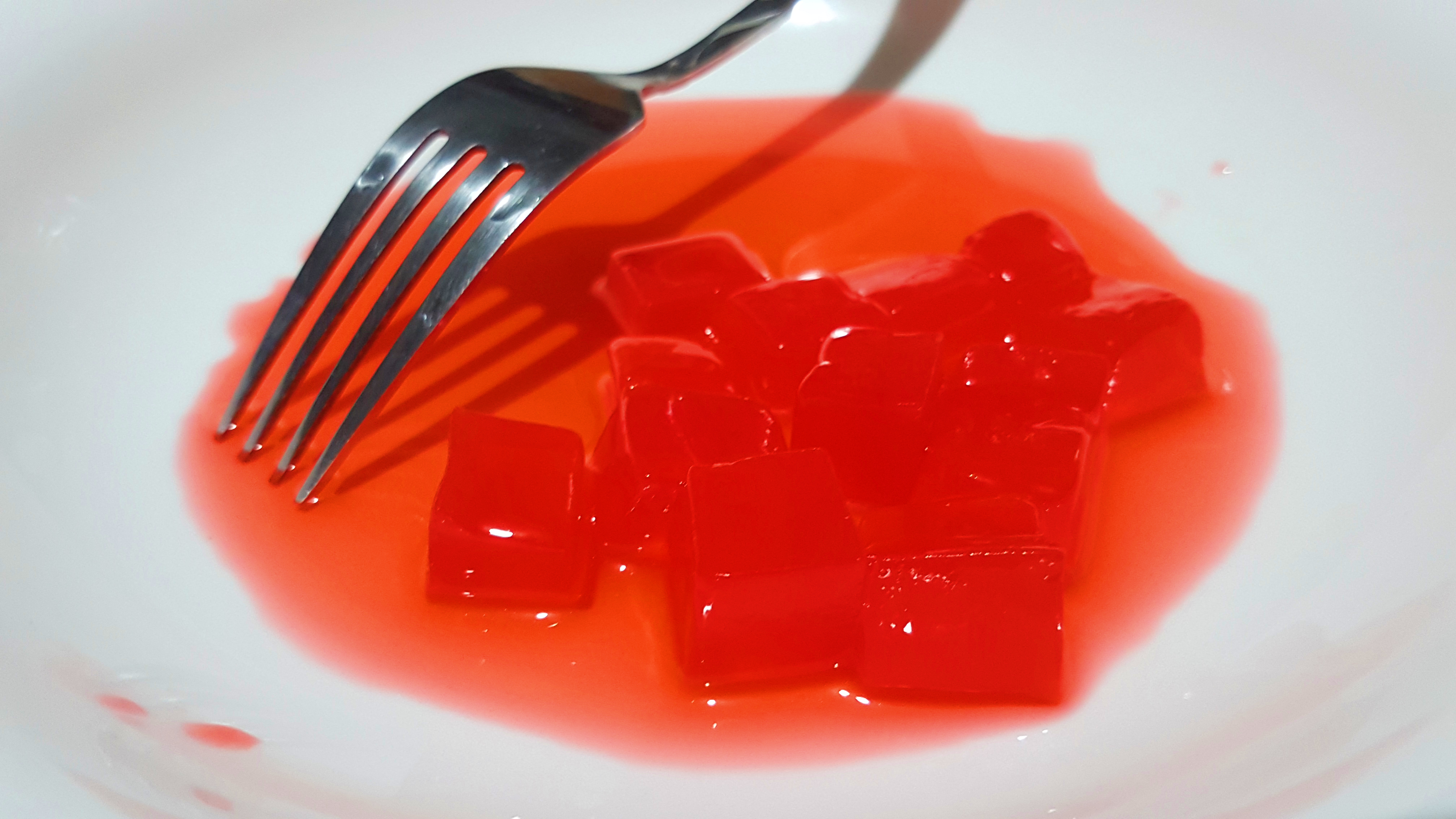
Red nata de coco in syrup from the Philippines

K. xylinus was used for a long time as a model organism for the study of cellulose production in plants. It is also studied in its own right to explore bacterial biofilm production, cell-cell communication, and other topics of interest. Production of bacterial cellulose for industrial uses has been the subject of extensive research, but is limited by productivity and scalability.

K. xylinus is a microorganism used in the culture of kombucha.

K. xylinus is also traditionally used in the Philippines for the production of jelly-like nata de piña and nata de coco desserts, made from pineapple juice and coconut water, respectively. The former has been produced since the 18th century.
