= Sprouted coconut =

Edible spherical cotyledons of germinating coconuts

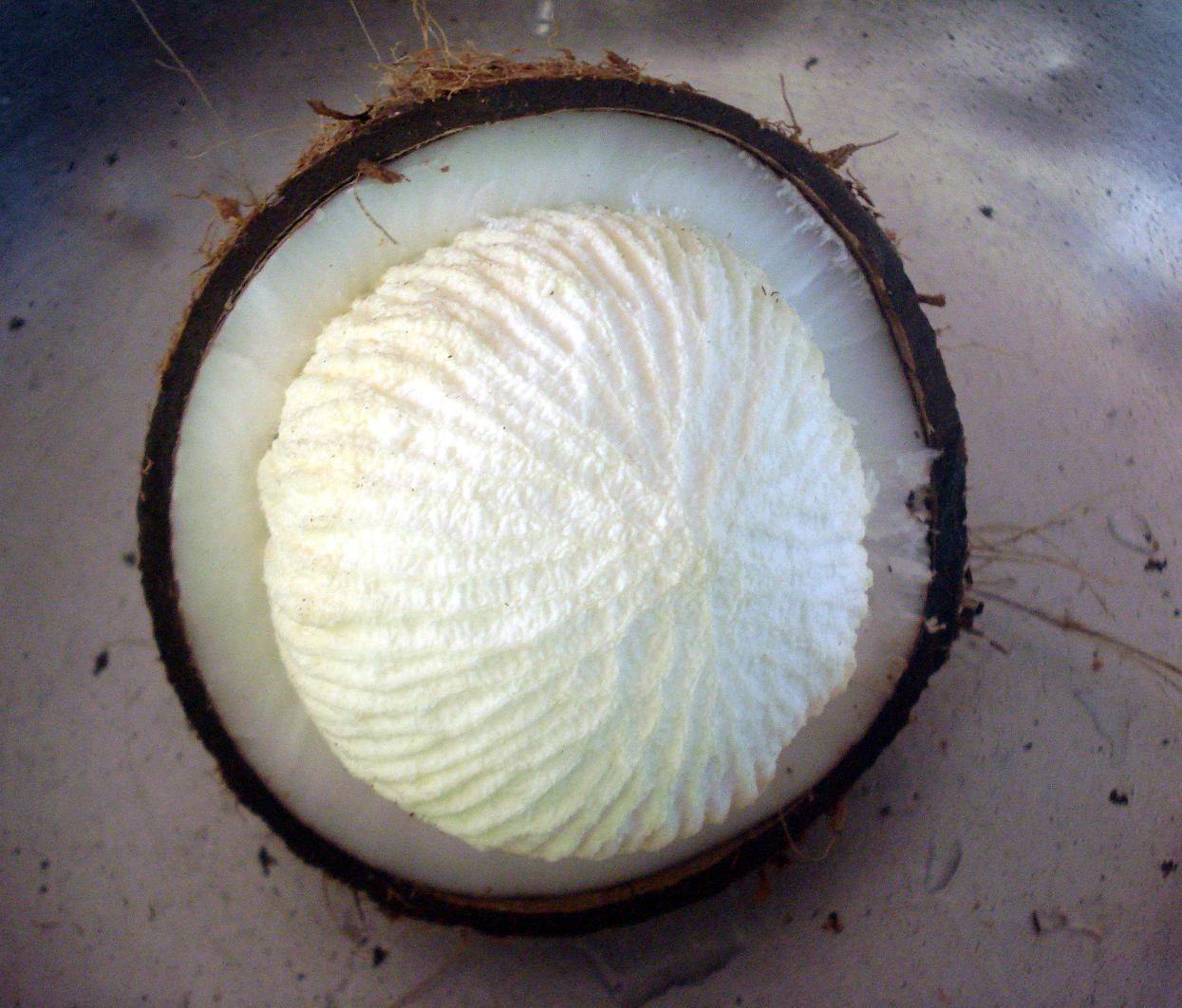
Coconut sprout from Kerala, India

Sprouted coconuts, also referred to as coconut sprouts, are the edible spherical sponge-like cotyledons of germinating coconuts. They have a crunchy watery texture with a slight sweetness. They are eaten in coconut-growing countries either as is or as part of various dishes. They are not commercially produced. They are also known variously as coconut pearls, coconut embryos, coconut candy, coconut apples, coconut cotyledons or simply coconembryos or coconapples.

== Names ==
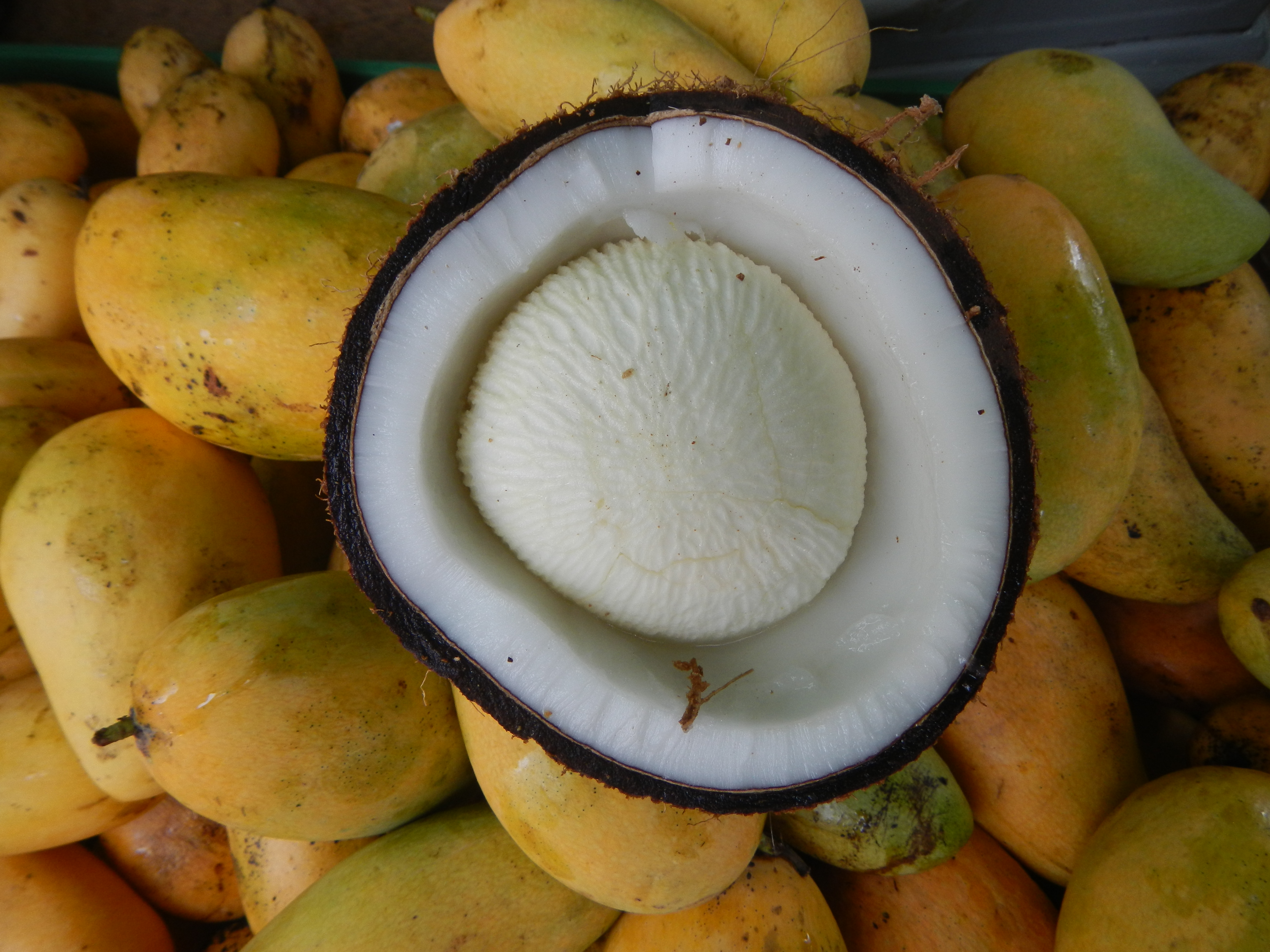
Small coconut sprout from the Philippines

Sprouted coconuts have a variety of names in countries where coconuts are native or cultivated. They are also known as vara in Fijian; tumbong ng niyog, buwá ng niyog or tubo ng niyog in Filipino; iho or lolo in Hawaiian; morund in Konkani; tumbong kelapa in Malaysian and Indonesian; pongu in Malayalam; niu tupu in Niuean; oʻo in Samoan; manzanas de coco in Spanish; ʻuto in Tahitian; seembu in Tamil; and bot-bot, buwa, buha, or bula in Visayan languages. They are also known as "queen's bread" in Hawaii.

== Description ==
Sprouted coconuts can be found inside sprouting mature coconut fruits. They can range from marble-sized to completely filling the cavity inside the endosperm of the coconut seed. They grow to maximum size at around 20 to 24 weeks after germination. They are technically haustoria, as they are cotyledonary structures that absorb nutrients and water from the solid and liquid endosperm, in this case, as food for the growing embryo.

Sprouted coconuts are preferably eaten while still fresh and small, as older larger sprouts tend to become rancid and have an unpleasant soapy taste.

== Nutrition ==
Sprouted coconuts contain around 66% carbohydrates, around 64% of which are soluble sugars. They contain considerable amounts of dietary fiber and minerals (particularly potassium, manganese, calcium, phosphorus, and magnesium).

== See also ==
- Macapuno
- Nata de coco
