= Nata de coco =

Chewy, jelly-like food produced by fermenting coconut water

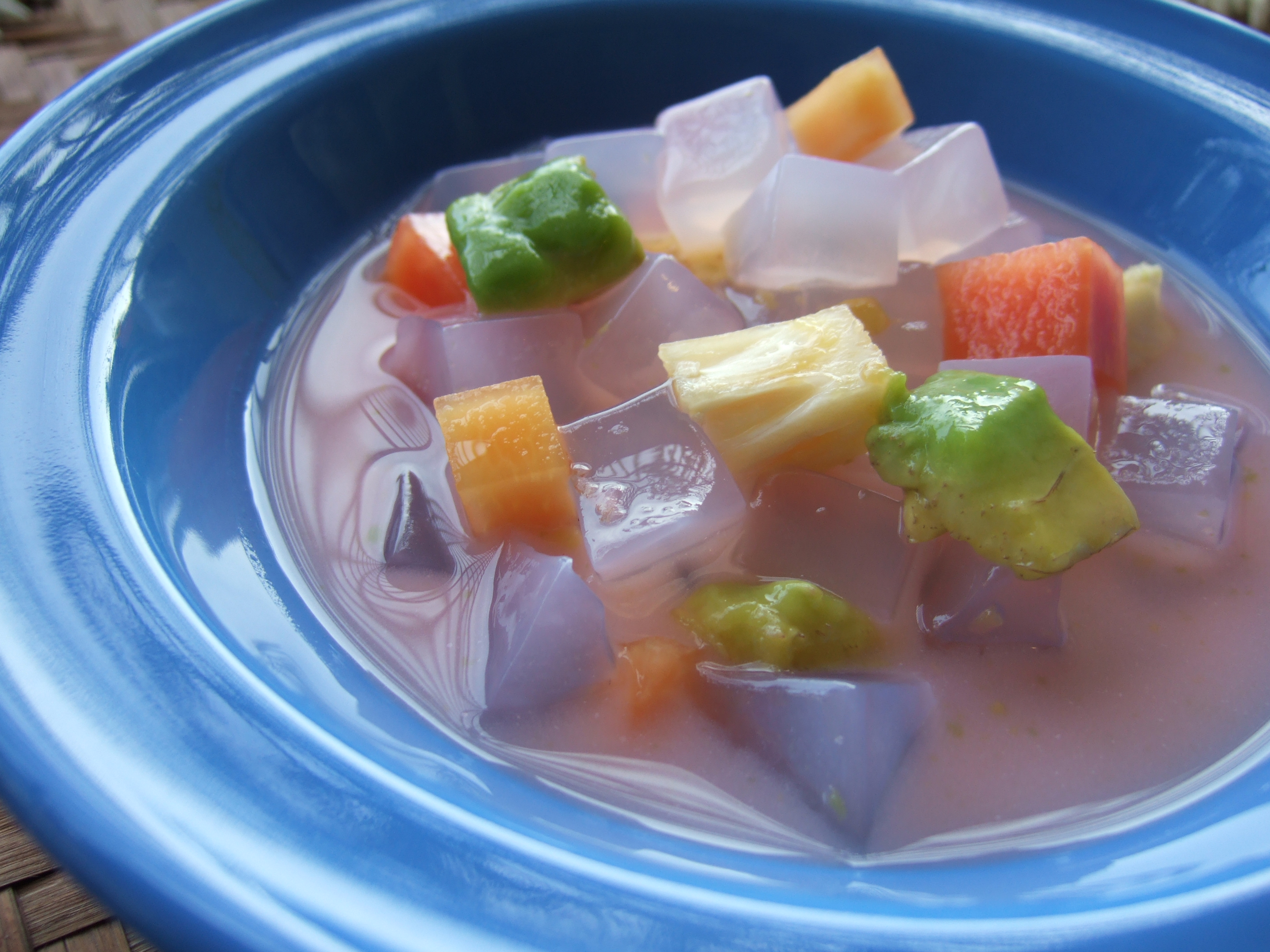
- The translucent cubes in this fruit salad are "nata de coco".
- Type: Confectionery or dessert
- Place of origin: Philippines
- Region or state: Central Luzon
- Main ingredients: Coconut water

Nata de coco, also marketed as coconut gel, is a chewy, translucent, jelly-like food produced by the fermentation of coconut water, which gels through the production of microbial cellulose by Komagataeibacter xylinus.

Originating in Ramon, Isabela, nata de coco was invented in 1949 by Teódula Kalaw África as an alternative to the traditional Filipino nata de piña made from pineapples. It is most commonly sweetened as a candy or dessert, and can accompany a variety of foods, including pickles, drinks, ice cream, puddings, and fruit cocktails. Nata de coco can also be made using ground konjac plant fibers. The konjac in the composition helps make nata de coco low in calories. Nata de coco with added konjac is often used to make low-calorie bubble tea.

== Etymology ==
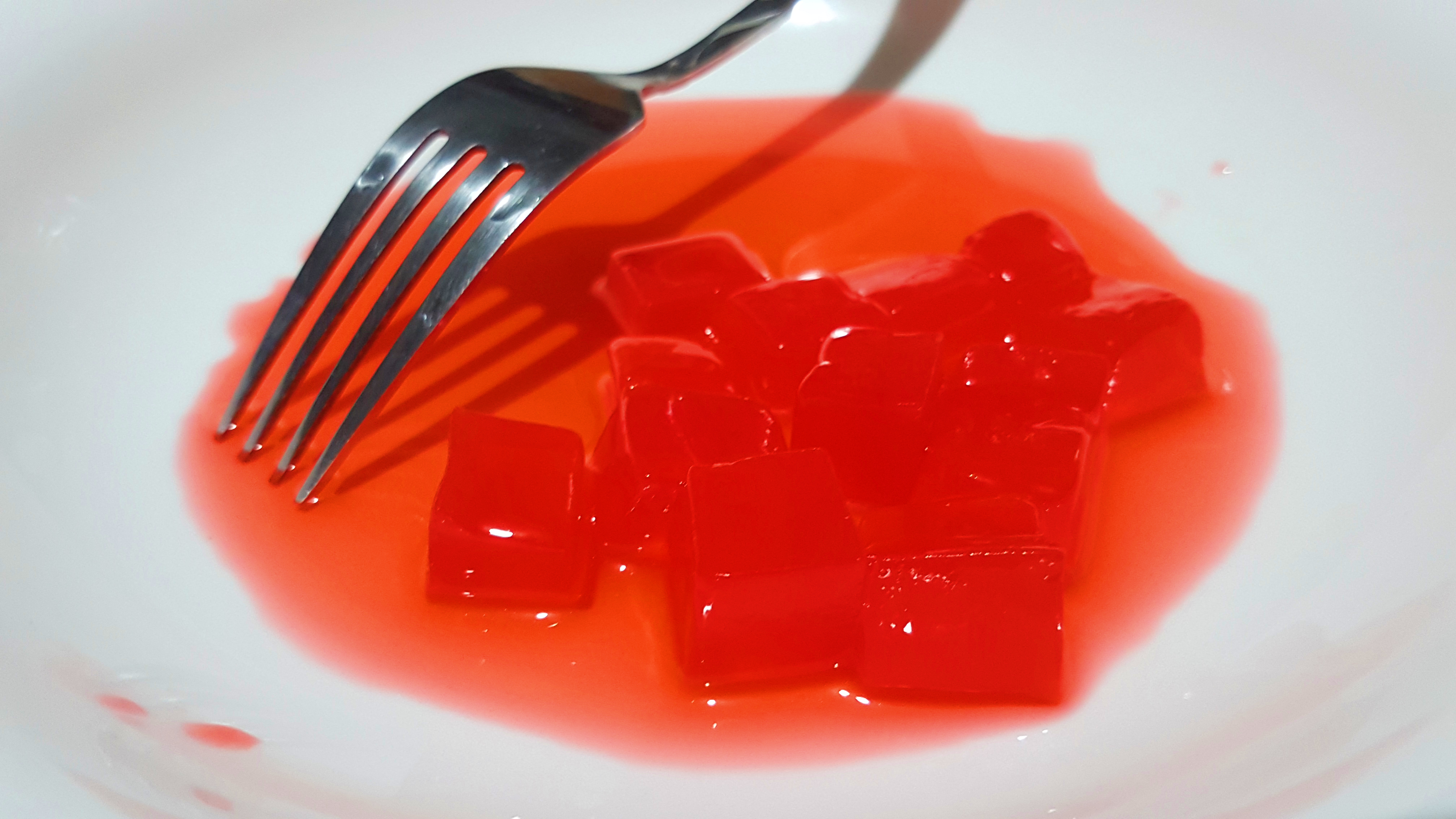
Red nata de coco in syrup

Nata de coco means "cream of coconut" in Spanish.

== History ==
Nata de coco was invented in 1949 by Teódula Kalaw África, a Filipino chemist working for the National Coconut Corporation (now the Philippine Coconut Authority). It was originally conceived as an alternative to nata de piña, another gel-like Filipino dessert produced since the 18th century. This was because though the demand was high, nata de piña was seasonal, as it relied on pineapple harvests from the declining piña fibre industry.

Commercial production of nata de coco began in 1954, when the agency, renamed the Philippine Coconut Administration, opened a branch in Alaminos, Laguna and introduced the technology to local farmers. Nata de coco production was later optimized in the mid-1970s through the efforts of a team of microbiologists led by Priscilla C. Sánchez. In the 20th century, the demand for coconuts increased. Products from coconuts became a major export product of the Philippines, including nata de coco.

== Nutrition ==
Nata de coco has a modest nutritional profile with high levels of dietary fiber and low fat content. It is an ingredient in many low-calorie desserts such as fruit cocktails, ice creams, and salads. It can also be used as a texture modifier and food thickener for baked products and frozen foods.

== Production ==
Commercially made nata de coco is made by small farms in the Philippines, especially in Laguna and Quezon, as well as Thailand, Vietnam, Malaysia, and Indonesia, especially in Yogyakarta. It is commonly sold in jars.

The coconut water dessert is primarily produced in this manner:

1. Extraction of the coconut water,
2. Fermentation of the coconut water with bacterial cultures,
3. Separation and cutting of the produced surface layer of nata de coco,
4. Cleaning and washing off the acetic acid,
5. Cutting and packaging

== Dessert ==
Nata de coco can be consumed on its own, but it may be used as an ingredient as well for fruit salads, halo-halo, coconut cakes, ice creams, soft drinks, bubble tea, and yogurts.

== See also ==
- Coconut sprout
- Macapuno
- SCOBY
