= Komagataeibacter =

Scientific classification
- Domain: Bacteria
- Kingdom: Pseudomonadati
- Phylum: Pseudomonadota
- Class: Alphaproteobacteria
- Order: Rhodospirillales
- Family: Acetobacteraceae
- Genus: Komagataeibacter; Yamada et al. 2013

Type species
- Komagataeibacter xylinus

Species
- See text.

Synonyms
- "Komagatabacter" Yamada et al. 2012

Genus of bacteria

Komagataeibacter is a genus of bacteria in the family Acetobacteraceae. It was described in 2012 by Yamada et al. The type species is Komagataeibacter xylinus.

== Species ==
The genus contains the following species:

- Komagataeibacter cocois Liu et al. 2018
- Komagataeibacter diospyri Naloka et al. 2020
- Komagataeibacter europaeus (Sievers et al. 1992) Yamada et al. 2013
- Komagataeibacter hansenii (Gosselé et al. 1983) Yamada et al. 2013
- Komagataeibacter intermedius (Boesch et al. 1998) Yamada et al. 2013
- Komagataeibacter kakiaceti (Iino et al. 2012) Yamada 2014
- Komagataeibacter kombuchae (Dutta and Gachhui 2007) Yamada et al. 2013
- Komagataeibacter maltaceti (Slapšak et al. 2013) Yamada 2014
- Komagataeibacter medellinensis (Castro et al. 2013) Yamada 2014
- Komagataeibacter melaceti Marič et al. 2020
- Komagataeibacter melomenusus Marič et al. 2020
- Komagataeibacter nataicola (Lisdiyanti et al. 2006) Yamada et al. 2013
- Komagataeibacter oboediens (Sokollek et al. 1998) Yamada et al. 2013
- Komagataeibacter pomaceti Škraban et al. 2019
- Komagataeibacter rhaeticus (Dellaglio et al. 2005) Yamada et al. 2013
- Komagataeibacter saccharivorans (Lisdiyanti et al. 2006) Yamada et al. 2013
- Komagataeibacter sucrofermentans (Toyosaki et al. 1996) Yamada et al. 2013
- Komagataeibacter swingsii (Dellaglio et al. 2005) Yamada et al. 2013
- Komagataeibacter xylinus (Brown 1886) Yamada et al. 2013

== See also ==
- Bacterial taxonomy
- Kombucha
- Microbiology
