= Sarcina maxima =

Scientific classification
- Domain: Bacteria
- Kingdom: Bacillati
- Phylum: Bacillota
- Class: Clostridia
- Order: Eubacteriales
- Family: Clostridiaceae
- Genus: Sarcina
- Species: S. maxima

Binomial name
- Sarcina maxima Lindner 1888

Type strain
- ATCC 33910, DSM 316

Synonyms
- Zymosarcina maxima Clostridium maximum(Lindner 1888) Lawson and Rainey 2016

Species of bacterium

Sarcina maxima is a bacterium from the genus Sarcina which has been isolated from faeces of an elephant.
