= Coconut water =

Clear liquid inside coconuts

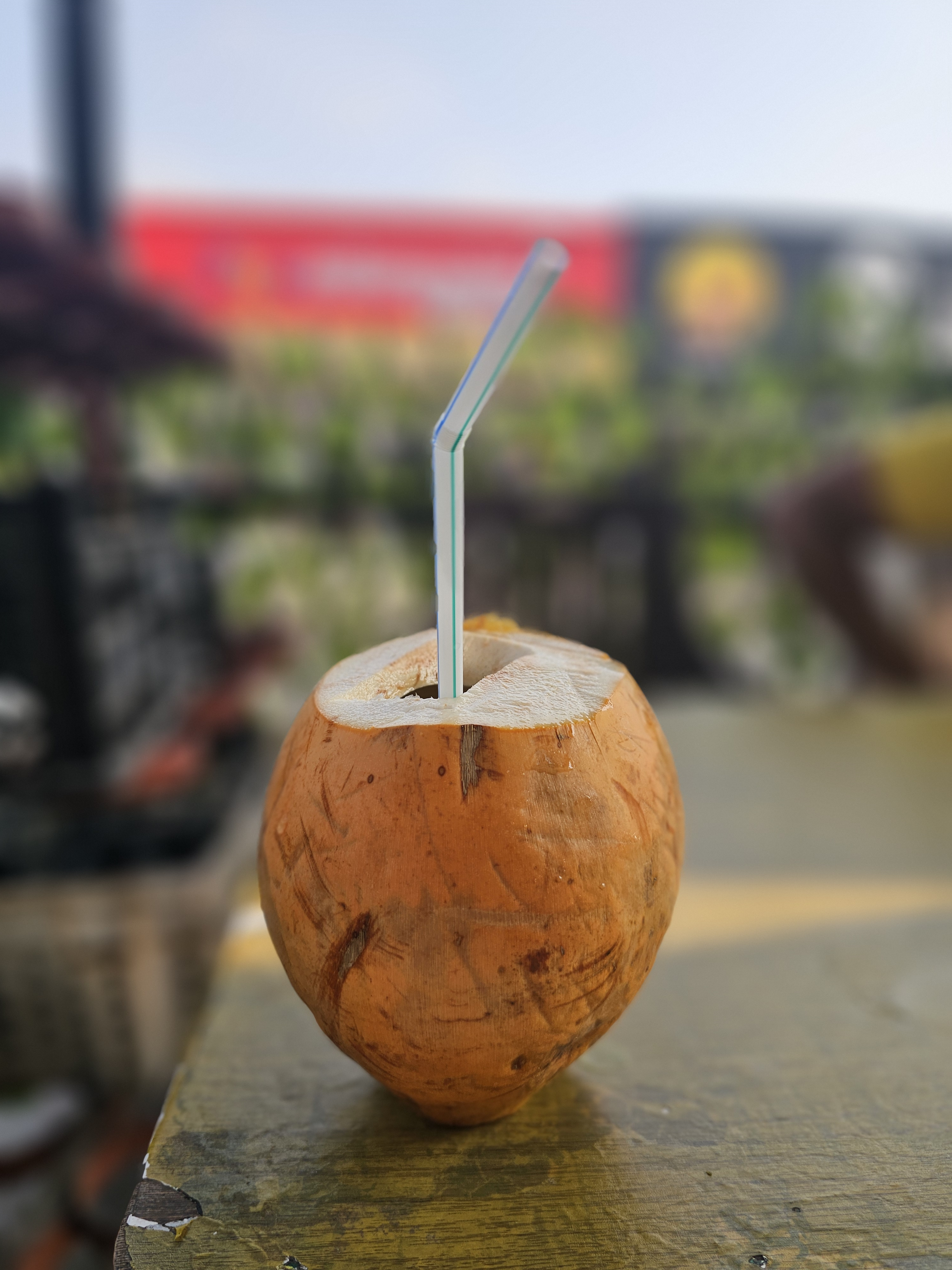
A young coconut, ready to drink with a straw

Coconut water (also coconut juice) is the clear liquid inside young coconuts (fruits of the coconut palm). In early development, it serves as a suspension for the endosperm of the coconut during the nuclear phase of development. As development continues, the endosperm matures into its cellular phase and deposits into the rind of the coconut pulp.

Plain coconut water has long been a popular drink in tropical countries, where it is available fresh, chilled, or packaged, either canned or bottled. The liquid inside young coconuts is sometimes preferred to the liquid of a ripened coconut. Coconut water from young green coconuts is also known specifically as buko juice in Philippine English.

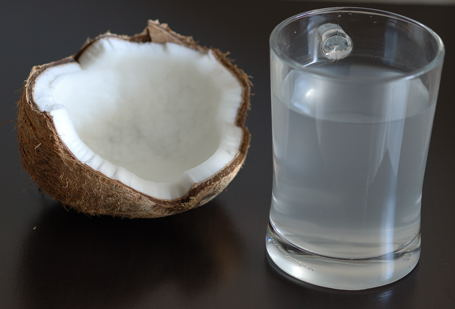
Coconut water from a mature coconut

== Harvesting ==
Fresh coconuts are typically harvested from the tree while they are green. A hole may be bored into the coconut to provide access to the "meat" (liquid and pulp). In young coconuts, the liquid and air may be under some pressure and may spray slightly when the inner husk is first penetrated. Coconuts that have fallen to the ground are susceptible to rot and damage from insects or other animals.

== Products ==
Fresh coconuts sold for their water by street vendors are cut open with machetes or similar implements in front of customers. Coconut water for retail can be found in ordinary aluminum drink cans, Tetra Pak cartons, glass bottles or plastic bottles, sometimes with coconut pulp or coconut jelly included.

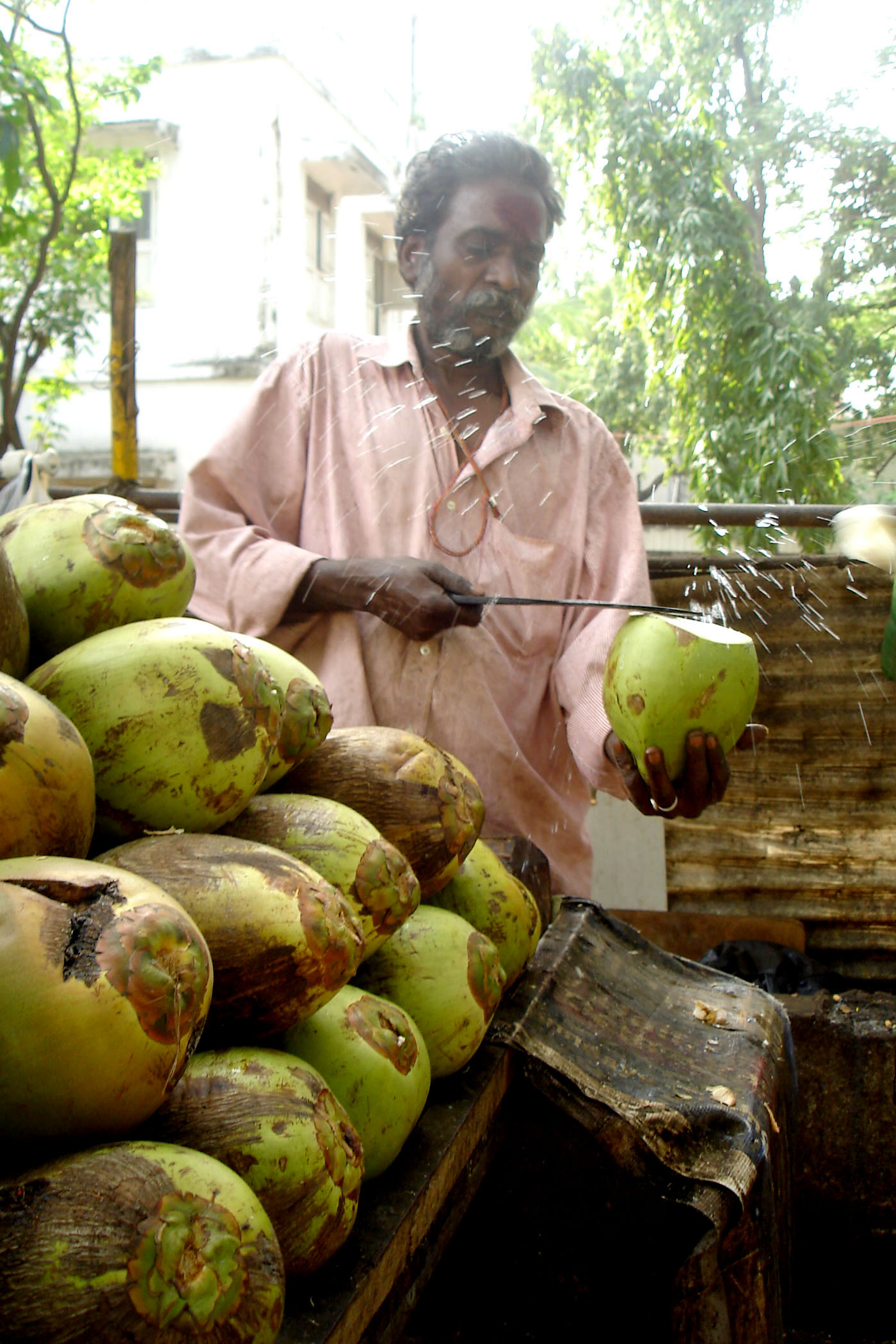
A coconut vendor hacks open a young coconut in Chennai, India.

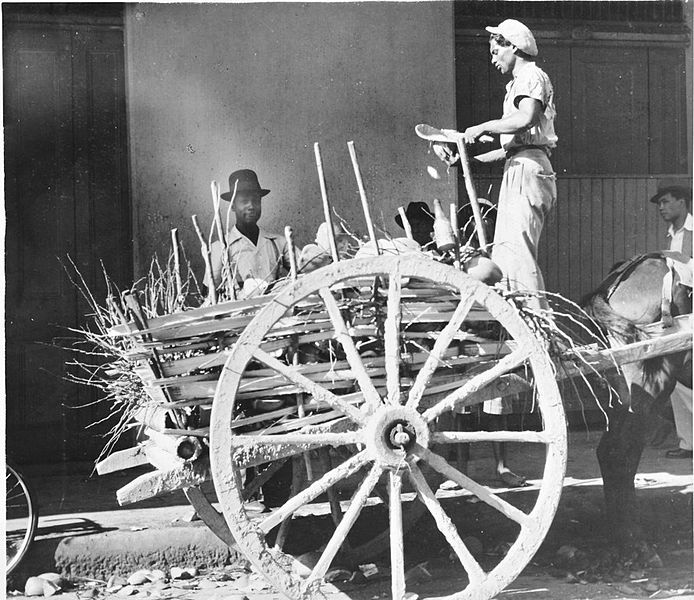
Coconut-water vendor on donkey cart, c. 1950. Port of Spain.

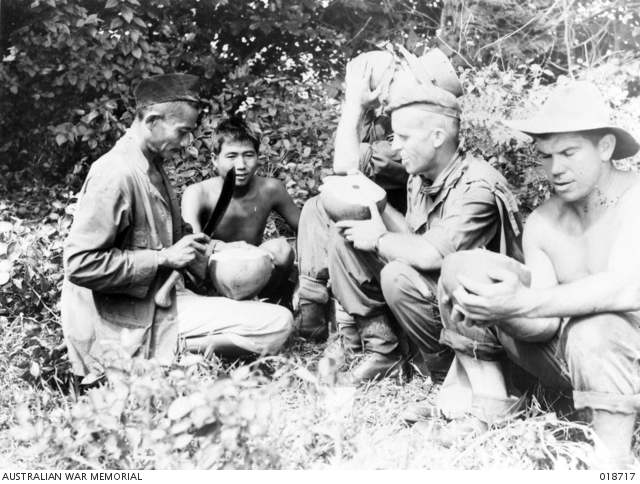
Native Indonesians in Labuan Island, British Borneo (present-day Malaysia) serving coconut water to Australian troops, 10 June 1945

Coconut water can be fermented to produce vinegar (though coconut sap is used more often). It is also used to make nata de coco, a jelly-like food.

== Nutritional value ==
Coconut water
Nutritional value per 100 g (3.5 oz)
- Energy: 79 kJ (19 kcal)
- Carbohydrates: 3.71 g
- Sugars: 2.61 g
- Dietary fiber: 1.1 g
- Fat: 0.20 g
- Saturated: 0.176 g
- Monounsaturated: 0.008 g
- Polyunsaturated: 0.002 g
- Protein: 0.72 g
Amino acids
Tryptophan	0.008 g
Threonine	0.026 g
Isoleucine	0.028 g
Leucine	0.053 g
Lysine	0.032 g
Methionine	0.013 g
Cystine	0.014 g
Phenylalanine	0.037 g
Tyrosine	0.022 g
Valine	0.044 g
Arginine	0.118 g
Histidine	0.017 g
Alanine	0.037 g
Aspartic acid	0.070 g
Glutamic acid	0.165 g
Glycine	0.034 g
Proline	0.030 g
Serine	0.037 g
Vitamins and minerals
Vitamins	Quantity %DV^{†}
Thiamine (B1)	3% 0.030 mg
Riboflavin (B2)	4% 0.057 mg
Niacin (B3)	1% 0.080 mg
Pantothenic acid (B5)	1% 0.043 mg
Vitamin B6	2% 0.032 mg
Folate (B9)	1% 3 μg
Choline	0% 1.1 mg
Vitamin C	3% 2.4 mg
Minerals	Quantity %DV^{†}
Calcium	2% 24 mg
Copper	4% 0.04 mg
Iron	2% 0.29 mg
Magnesium	6% 25 mg
Manganese	6% 0.142 mg
Phosphorus	2% 20 mg
Potassium	8% 250 mg
Selenium	2% 1 μg
Sodium	5% 105 mg
Zinc	1% 0.10 mg
- Other constituents: Quantity
- Water: 95 g
- Full link to USDA Database entry
- ^{†}Percentages estimated using US recommendations for adults, except for potassium, which is estimated based on expert recommendation from the National Academies.

Providing 79 kilojoules (19 kilocalories) of food energy in a 100-millilitre (3 1/2-US-fluid-ounce) amount, coconut water is 95% water and 4% carbohydrates, with negligible protein and fat content (table). Coconut water contains small amounts of vitamins and dietary minerals, all under 10% of the Daily Value (DV).

=== Risks ===
The Food and Drug Administration has identified a risk of bacterial contamination in coconut water sold as "raw".

Anecdotal sources describe coconut water being used in the southern part of India for senicide, the killing of elderly people, a procedure known as thalaikoothal. In this custom, the elderly person is made to drink an excessive amount of coconut water, eventually resulting in fever and death, the exact causes of which have not been determined.

== False advertising ==
Marketing claims attributing health benefits to coconut water are disallowed by certain regulatory agencies like the United States Food and Drug Administration. They warn producers that making misleading marketing claims (such as coconut water is antiviral, can lower cholesterol, can regulate blood glucose levels, and other false claims) are inappropriate for the product.

Some companies have faced class-action lawsuits over false advertising claims that the product is "super-hydrating", "nutrient-packed", and "mega-electrolyte". The plaintiffs also alleged that one company, Vita Coco, falsely claimed that its product had "15 times the electrolytes found in sports drinks" and misrepresented the levels of sodium and magnesium as advertised. The company denied any wrongdoing and settled the lawsuit for US$10 million in April 2012.

== Medical use in Cambodia ==
Although substituting coconut water for saline is not recommended by physicians today, it was a common practice during the Khmer Rouge regime in Cambodia from 1975 to 1979. The Documentation Center of Cambodia cited the practice of allowing untrained nurses to administer green coconut water during the Pol Pot regime as a crime against humanity.

== See also ==
- Coconut milk
- Coconut sugar
- Juicing
- List of juices
- Palm wine
- Coconut oil
