= Koch–Pasteur rivalry =

19th-century scientific rivalry

The French Louis Pasteur (1822–1895) and German Robert Koch (1843–1910) are the two greatest figures in medical microbiology and in establishing acceptance of the germ theory of disease (germ theory). In 1882, fueled by national rivalry and a language barrier, the tension between Pasteur and the younger Koch erupted into an acute conflict.

Pasteur had already discovered molecular chirality, investigated fermentation, refuted spontaneous generation, inspired Lister's introduction of antisepsis to surgery, introduced pasteurization to France's wine industry, answered the silkworm diseases blighting France's silkworm industry, attenuated a Pasteurella species of bacteria to develop vaccine to chicken cholera (1879), and introduced anthrax vaccine (1881).

Koch had transformed bacteriology by introducing the technique of pure culture, whereby he established the microbial cause of the disease anthrax (1876), had introduced both staining and solid culture plates to bacteriology (1881), had identified the microbial cause of tuberculosis (1882), had incidentally popularized Koch's postulates for identifying the microbial cause of a disease, and would later identify the microbial cause of cholera (1883).

Although Koch had briefly and, thereafter, his bacteriological followers regarded a bacterial species' properties as unalterable, Pasteur's modification of virulence to develop vaccine demonstrated this doctrine's falsity. At an 1882 conference, a mistranslated term from French to German during Pasteur's lecture triggered Koch's indignation, whereupon Koch's two bacteriologist colleagues, Friedrich Loeffler and Georg Gaffky, published denigration of the entirety of Pasteur's research on anthrax since 1877.

== Tensions between France and Germany ==
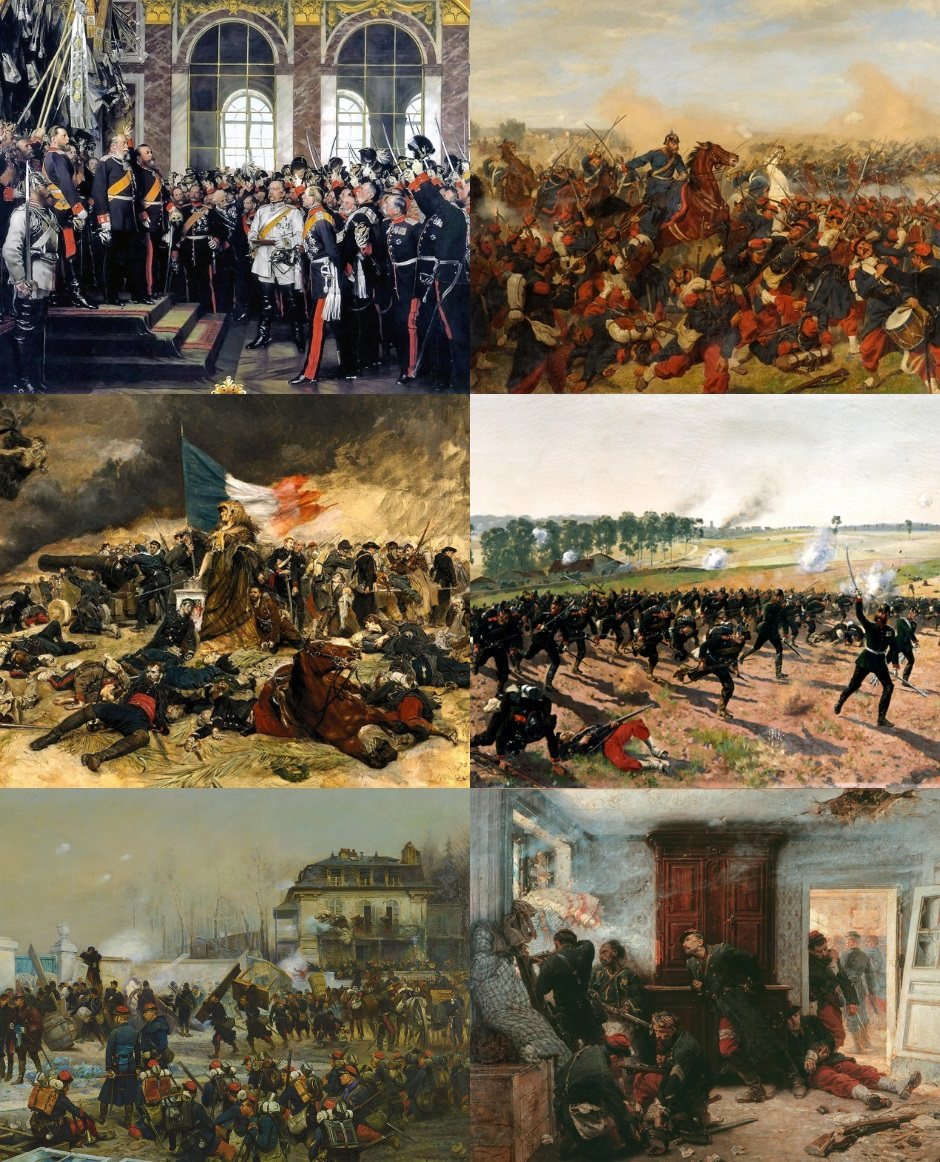
Collage depicting the Franco-Prussian war.

Germany had unified by way of its victory in the Franco-Prussian War (1870–71), seizing Alsace-Lorraine from France. Pasteur was professor in the University of Strasbourg, located in Alsace, where he married the daughter of the rector. Jean Baptiste Pasteur, the only son of Louis and Marie Pasteur, was a soldier in the Franco-Prussian War. The tone set by this war contributed to the rivalry between Koch and Pasteur. The "German Problem", as Germany increasingly gained scientific, technological, and industrial dominance, fed tensions among European nations. Germ theory's applications were embedded in the heightening quest by France, Germany, Britain, and Italy to colonize Africa and Asia with the aid of tropical medicine, a new variant of colonial medicine, while medical scientists in respective nations vied to lead advances.

== Koch's bacteriology and anthrax ==
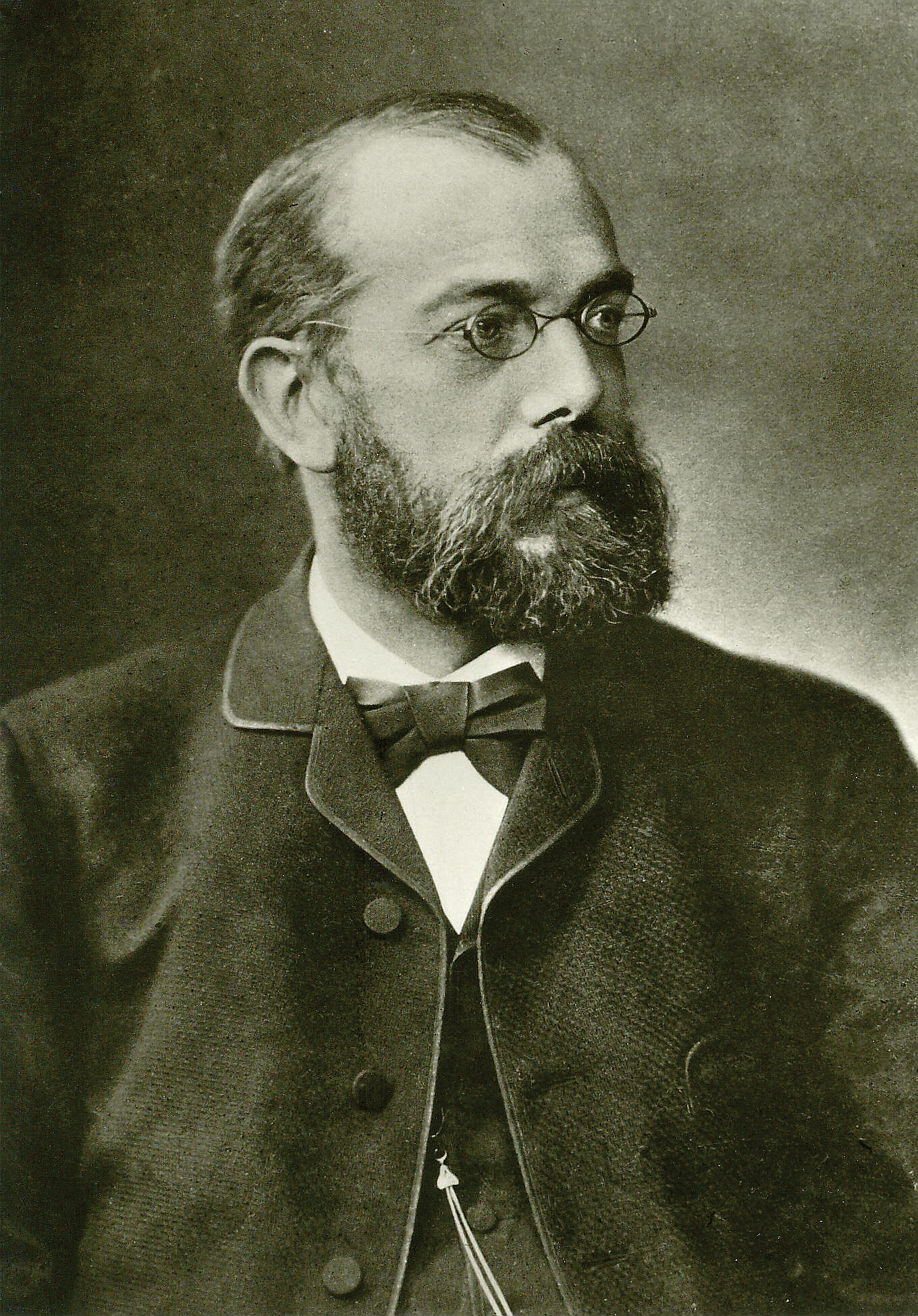
Robert Koch (1843–1910), a German physician. He was awarded the Nobel Prize in Physiology or Medicine for his tuberculosis findings in 1905.

In 1863, influenced by Pasteur's research on fermentation, fellow Frenchman Casimir Davaine mostly explained the cause of anthrax, but Davaine's explanation was opposed by those who rejected the idea that infection with a microorganism could explain it. In 1840, Jakob Henle had proposed microorganism infections caused diseases, and in 1875 German botanist Ferdinand Cohn weighed in on a controversy in microbiology by declaring that the elementary unit was the cell and that each form of bacteria was constant and naturally divided from the other forms. Influenced by Henle and by Cohn, Koch developed a pure culture of the bacteria described by Davaine, traced its spore stage, inoculated it into animals, and showed it caused anthrax. Pasteur called this a "remarkable achievement". In pure culture, bacteria tend to keep constant traits, and Koch reported having already observed constancy.

Pasteur undertook investigation, yet gave much credit to Davaine. Meanwhile, Pasteur's researchers always reported variation in their cultures. In 1879, Henri Toussaint identified a bacterial species involved in chicken cholera and named the genus in honor of Pasteur, Pasteurella. In Pasteur's laboratory, a culture of Pasteurella multocida was left out over a weekend exposed to air, and Pasteur and Emile Roux noticed upon return to the laboratory that its virulence to chickens was diminished. Pasteur applied the discovery to develop chicken cholera vaccine, introduced in a public experiment, an empirical challenge to the stance of Koch's bacteriologists that bacterial traits were unalterable.

== Pasteur's attenuation and vaccines ==
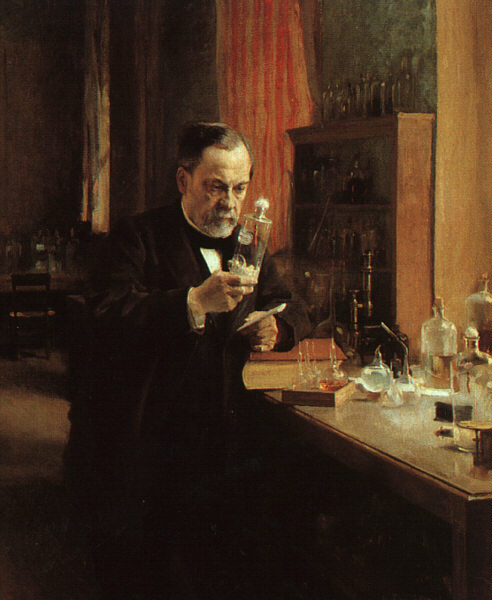
Louis Pasteur (1822–1895), microbiologist and chemist

From 1878 to 1880, when publishing on anthrax, Pasteur referred to the bacteria by the name given it by Frenchman Davaine, but in one footnote called it "Bacillus anthracis of the Germans". In July 1880 Toussaint reported developing a technique of chemical deactivation to produce anthrax vaccine that successfully protected dogs and cattle, and was praised by the Academy of Science, but Pasteur attacked the feat—chemical deactivation and not virulence attenuation to make a vaccine—as impossible. Pasteur soon introduced his own anthrax vaccine in a highly successful public experiment, and entered commerce with it. Pasteur was criticized by Koch and colleagues. (Pasteur had not used attenuation, but secretly used Toussaint's technique.)

== Microbe hunting, cholera, and public health ==
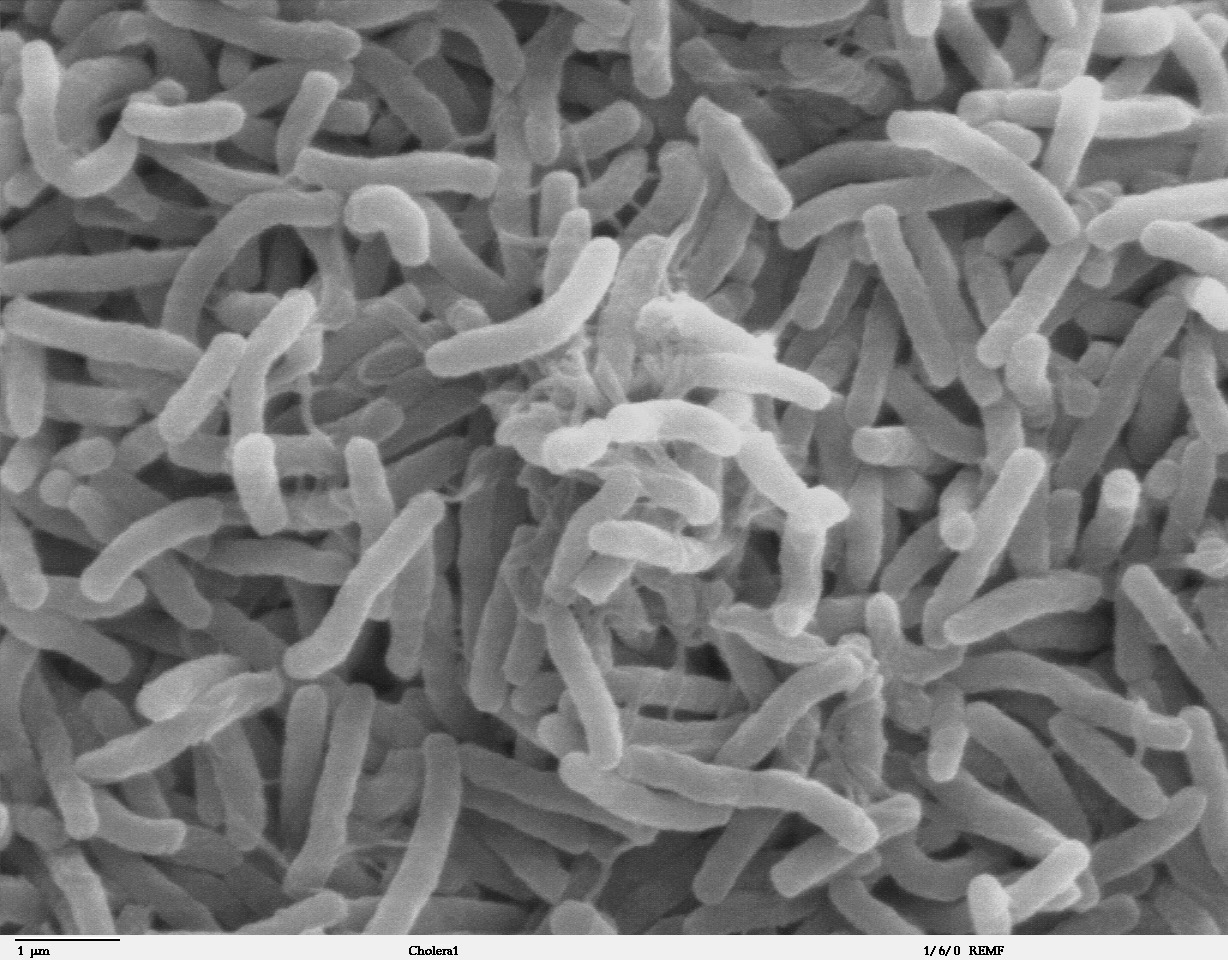
Cholera bacteria under a microscope.

In 1883, responding to a cholera epidemic in Alexandria, Egypt, both Pasteur and Koch sent missions vying to identify its cause. Koch returned victorious, whereupon Pasteur switched research direction and began development of rabies vaccine. As to public health, Koch's bacteriologists feuded with Max von Pettenkofer—whose miasmatic theory claimed the bacteria was but one causal factor among at least several—but von Pettenkoffer stubbornly opposed water treatment, and the massive cholera epidemic in Hamburg, Germany, in 1892 devastated von Pettenkofer's position, and German public health was grounded on Koch's bacteriology. Meanwhile, Pasteur led introduction of pasteurization in France.

== Rabies vaccine and Pasteur Institute ==
Rabies, uncommon but excruciating and almost invariably fatal, was dreaded. Amid anthrax vaccine's success, Pasteur introduced rabies vaccine (1885), the first human vaccine since Jenner's smallpox vaccine (1796). On 6 July 1885, the vaccine was tested on 9-year old Joseph Meister who had been bitten by a rabid dog but failed to develop rabies, and Pasteur was called a hero. (Even without vaccination, not everyone bitten by a rabid dog develops rabies.) After other apparently successful cases, donations poured in from across the globe, funding the establishment of the Pasteur Institute, the globe's first biomedical institute, which opened in Paris in 1888.

Pasteur Institute trained military physicians in colonial medicine, although French government soon took over this role. The success of Pasteur's modification of bacterial virulence inspired confidence in the universality of Pasteurian science, though Pasteur's researchers preferred the term microbiology over the term bacteriology. Koch discouraged use of rabies vaccine, whose production later became a premise for opening Pasteur Institutes abroad, as in Shanghai, China. The first overseas Pasteur Institute was opened by Albert Calmette in Saigon in French Indochina in 1891, although Pasteur's nephew Adrien Loir was already planning to open one in Australia.

== Tuberculin and Robert Koch Institute ==
In 1882, Koch reported identification of the tubercle bacillus as the cause of tuberculosis, cementing germ theory. Koch took his research into a new direction—applied research—to develop a tuberculosis treatment and use the profits to found his own research institute, autonomous from government. In 1890 Koch introduced the intended drug, tuberculin, but it soon proved ineffective, and accounts of deaths followed in news press. Amid Koch's reluctance to disclose tuberculin's formula, Koch's reputation sustained damage, but Koch retained lasting acclaim and received the 1905 Nobel Prize in Physiology or Medicine "for his investigations and discoveries in relation to tuberculosis". Koch accepted government's offer to direct the Institute for Infectious Diseases (1891), in Berlin, a prestigious position but not the kind of institute that Koch had sought. It was later renamed the Robert Koch Institute, which remains a government organization.

== American medicine embraces Koch ==
The monomorphist doctrine of Koch's bacteriologists suggested public health interventions to eliminate bacteria, whereas Pasteur's acceptance of variation suggested attenuating bacterial virulence in the laboratory to develop vaccines. Although inspired by Pasteur's applications suggesting medicine's potential, American physicians traveled to Germany to learn Koch's bacteriology as basic science, though Pasteur emphasized the fuzzy boundary between basic science and applied science.

From 1876 to 1878, the American William Henry Welch trained in Germany pathology, and in 1879 opened America's first scientific laboratory, a pathology laboratory in Bellevue's medical school in New York. While in Germany, Welch had met John Shaw Billings who had been appointed by Daniel Coit Gilman—the first president of the newly forming Johns Hopkins University—to plan Hopkins' hospital and medical school. Named the medical school's first dean in 1883, Welch promptly traveled for training in Koch's bacteriology, and returned to America eager to transform medicine with the "secrets of nature". Hopkins medical school opened in 1894 with Welch emphasizing Koch's bacteriology, which became the foundation of modern medicine.

As "dean of American medicine", William H Welch became the first scientific director of Rockefeller Institute for Medical Research (1901), and appointed his former Hopkins student Simon Flexner the first director of pathology and bacteriology laboratories. Aided by the "Flexner report", published in 1910 while Welch was president of the American Medical Association, Welch's view of science and medicine became the national standard, a transformation of American medical education completed around 1930. As first dean of America's first public health school, founded in 1916 at Hopkins, Welch set the standard for public health, and with Simon Flexner exported the Hopkins model internationally.

== Pasteur's image ascends ==
Although Pasteur died in 1895, eventually over thirty official Pasteur Institutes opened across the globe. Pasteur's team had planned in 1885 to open a rabies-treatment facility in St. Louis, Missouri, and an American Pasteur Institute in New York City, but the plans were abandoned, and America has never hosted an official Pasteur Institute.

A number of American copycats appeared, however, starting with "Chicago Pasteur Institute" in 1890, and "New York Pasteur Institute" in 1891. In 1897 a "Pasteur Institute" opened in Baltimore, in 1900 in Pittsburgh and St. Louis, in 1903 in Ann Arbor and Austin, and in 1904 perhaps in Philadelphia. In 1908, Georgia Department of Public Health opened a "Pasteur Department" in Atlanta, California State Hygienic Laboratory opened a "Pasteur Division" in Berkeley, and a "Pasteur Institute" opened in Washington, D.C.

In 1900, Paul Gibier, the French medical scientist who opened "New York Pasteur Institute", accidentally died, but his nephew, George Gibier Rambaud, continued it on reduced scale until he closed it when US Medical Corps commissioned him overseas in 1918. While MDs ascended in American public health, it was thought that "the greatest contribution of all, the foundation upon which modern sanitary science is built, was made by Pasteur."

== Nationalism flares ==
Koch was celebrated by the American medical community, including by Welch, when at last Koch visited America in 1908. Soon, however, America was influenced by the British and French view that although their denizens appreciated Germany's progress in science and arts, Germany was elitist and dismissive while socially and politically antiquated, so authoritarian and aggressive as to resemble medieval tyranny.

In 1917, when America entered World War I (1914–18), US government seized German-owned property and assets, including Bayer AG's American trademarks and the 80% of Merck & Co's shares owned by George Merck. Welch exhibited gratuitous anti-German bias despite the debt of his own career, thus American medicine, to Germany, especially to Koch's bacteriology.

After World War II (1939–45), and more of the "German Problem", Merck & Co became the global leader in vaccinology.

== Two legacies ==
Tuberculin's main use rapidly became in determining M tuberculosis infection—a use remaining till today—but this use soon revealed that in London, 9 of 10 individuals were infected, whereas only 1 in 10 of the infected developed the disease. In 1901 at the London Congress on Tuberculosis, Koch stated on theoretical grounds that M bovis, which infects cows, was not transmissible to humans. British attendees disagreed, and later Theobald Smith and the English Royal Commission empirically established that M bovis was transmissible and could result in human disease. Though widely considered ineffective as treatment, tuberculin might have remained in use for this purpose until the 1940s and maybe had some effectiveness.

Milk pasteurization became popular in America around 1920. In 1921 Albert Calmette and Camille Guérin of Pasteur Institute introduced tuberculosis vaccine, whose virulence of strains varied in the late 1920s. BCG vaccine was not used in the public health of America, which virtually eliminated tuberculosis without it. BCG vaccine's effectiveness preventing tuberculosis remains uncertain, but appears to confer nonspecific survival gains, as perhaps by preventing leprosy, and is a cancer treatment.

Pasteur had highlighted a new threat—microorganisms benign to humans passing among and multiplying in nonhuman animals while gaining new virulence for humans—that is thought to loom and to have approximately materialized with AIDS. Although Koch's postulates are often inapplicable, they remain heuristic, and the authority of "fulfilling Koch's postulates" is still invoked in medical science, though often in modified form, as in the identification of HIV-1 as the cause of AIDS or the identification of SARS coronavirus as the cause of SARS.

Germ theory's stance that the "germ" was the disease's necessary and sufficient cause—the single factor both required and complete to result in the disease—proved false. Germ theory gradually evolved to include other factors, whereupon germ theory resembled miasmatic theory, which had had to recognize bacteria as a causal factor, and so the two competing explanations merged without true, decisive victor. Twentieth-century philosophy, inspired by revolutions in physics, establishment of molecular biology, and advances in epidemiology, revealed that any claim of a single causal factor both necessary (required) and sufficient (complete), the cause, is untenable. French-born microbiologist René Dubos, a biographer of Pasteur, discussed tuberculosis to illustrate disease's social causes and to illustrate the failure of germ theory, whose apparent successes were aided by improvements in nutrition and living conditions but sparked scientific research that brought a wealth of new understandings.
