= Marie Pasteur =

Assistant of Louis Pasteur (1826–1910)

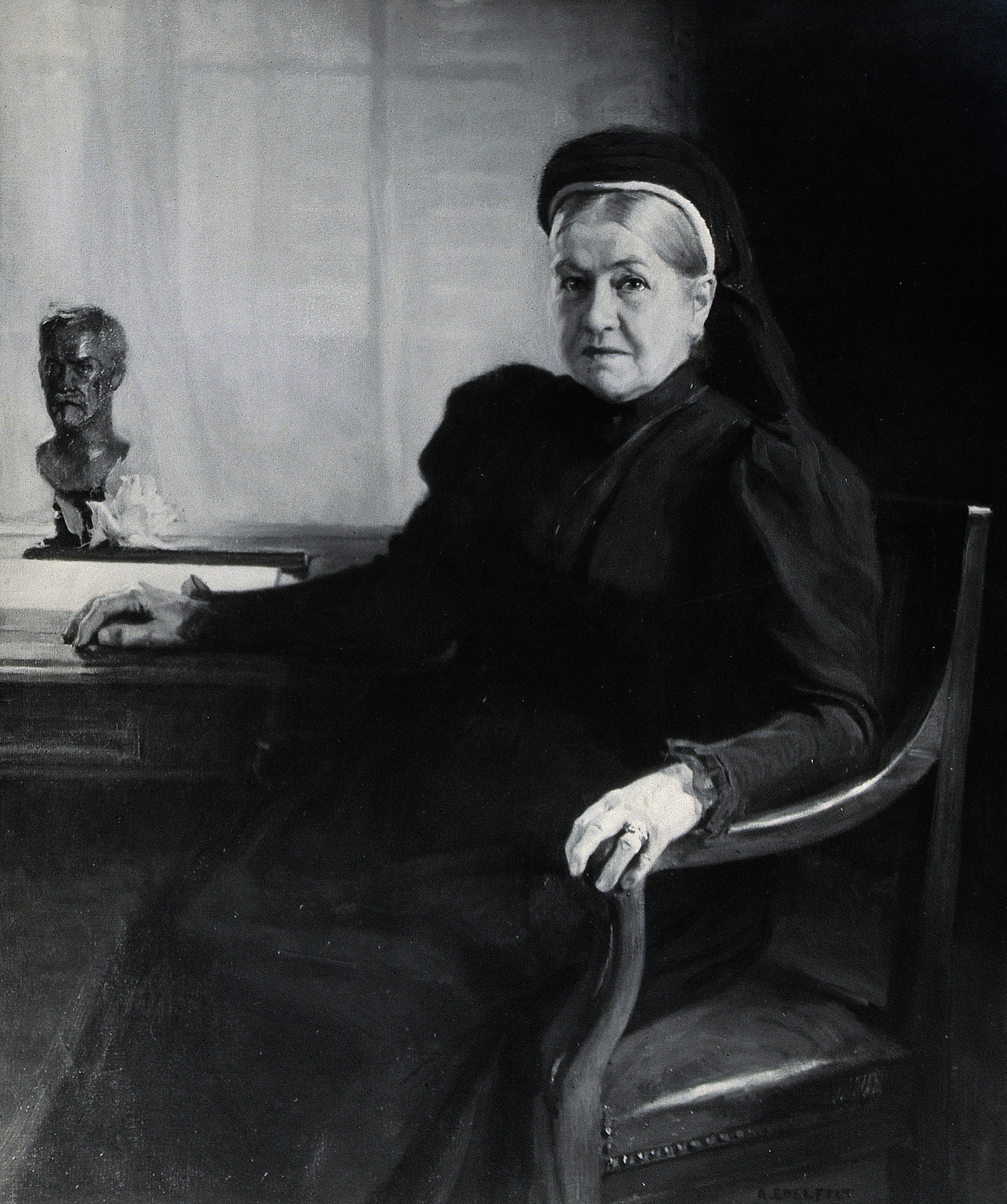
- Pasteur in 1899
- Born: Marie Laurent; 15 January 1826; Clermont-Ferrand, France
- Died: 28 September 1910 (aged 84); Paris, France
- Occupation: Scientific assistant
- Known for: Discoveries made with husband and colleague Louis Pasteur
- Spouse: Louis Pasteur (m. 1849; died 1895)
- Children: 5

Marie Pasteur, née Laurent (15 January 1826 in Clermont-Ferrand, France – 28 September 1910 in Paris), was the scientific assistant and co-worker of her husband, the famous French chemist and bacteriologist Louis Pasteur.

== Life ==
Marie Pasteur was one of the daughters of the Rector of the Strasbourg Academy. She married in Strasbourg 29 May 1849, aged 23, to Louis Pasteur, aged 26.

Marie worked as a secretary and science writer to her spouse and served as his amanuensis. She was his active assistant in his scientific experiments. She worked with him on expanding his first researches, around 1848, on the remarks previously made by Mitscherlich on the different optical properties concerning polarized light of tartaric acid when it came from natural wines, wine lees and when it was synthesized in a laboratory. The students and colleagues of Louis Pasteur acknowledged the importance she had for him in his work as his assistant. She grew the silkworms he needed for his experiment with their diseases, and she took care of the children he tried his famous experimental treatment on. She moved with him to his quarters at the Pasteur Institute, and continued to live there after his death.

It seems that for years afterward, famous crystallographer, physicist and mathematician Jean Baptiste Biot, Marie Pasteur, and Louis' father, Jean Joseph, cooperated in providing Louis with moral support. For instance, in a letter by Biot to Jean Joseph: "your son is ours also and we share with Marie all our love for him, too". The philosopher Charles Chappuis was also a supporter and friend of Louis.

The Pasteurs had five children, of whom two reached adulthood. Their eldest daughter, Jeanne, died from typhoid fever, aged 9, at Arbois. Then, in 1865, 2-year-old Camille also died of typhus, followed by 12 1/2-year-old Cécile on 23 May 1866. Only Jean Baptiste and Marie Louise lived to be adults. Jean Baptiste would be a soldier in the Franco-Prussian War.

Marie Pasteur was buried in the crypt of the Pasteur Institute.

== Sources ==
- The Biographical Dictionary of Women in Science: Pioneering Lives from Ancient Times to the Mid-20th Century (2 Vol. Set) by Marilyn Bailey Ogilvie and Joy Dorothy Harvey (eds.), Taylor and Francis, Kindle Edition, (wireless edition), File Size: 2779 KB, Print Length: 1499 pages
- The Biographical Dictionary of Women in Science: L-Z by Marilyn Bailey Ogilvie, Joy Dorothy Harvey
