= Adrien Loir =

French bacteriologist

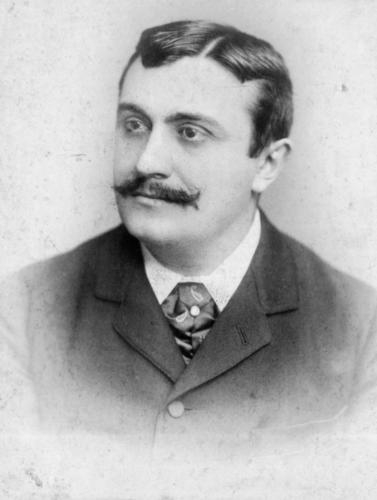
- Adrien Loir
- Born: 15 December 1862; Lyon
- Died: 1941 (aged 78–79)
- Scientific career
- Fields: bacteriology
- Workplaces: Pasteur Institute

Adrien Loir (15 December 1862 – 1941) was a French bacteriologist born in Lyon. He was a nephew of Louis Pasteur, and for much of his career was associated with the Pasteur Institute.

From 1882 to 1888 Loir was an assistant in Pasteur's laboratory in Paris, where he performed research of swine fever. In 1886, he installed the first anti-rabies clinic in Saint Petersburg. Between 1888 and 1893 he made two journeys to Australia to conduct research of anthrax and pleuropneumonia. While there, he investigated the use of chicken cholera bacillus in an attempt to eradicate the country's rabbit infestation.

In 1893 he founded the Pasteur Institute of Tunisia, and for several years was a professor of hygiene and bacteriology at the colonial school in Tunis. In 1906 he traveled to Canada, where he demonstrated that the equine disease, dourine is caused by the parasite Trypanosoma equiperdum.

== Written works ==
- Notes on the large death rate among Australian sheep, in country infected with Cumberland Disease, or splenic fever, Journal and Proceedings of the Royal Society of New South Wales, 1891.
- Notes on a spontaneous disease among Australian rabbits, Journal and Proceedings of the Royal Society of New South Wales, 1891.
- L'Institut pasteur d'Australie, La Nature 9 July 1892 and 30 July 1892.
- Chez les aborigènes australiens, La Nature 23 June 1893 and 5 July 1893.
- Les lapins en Australie, La Nature 19 August 1893.
- Histoire des épidémies de peste à Tunis. Revue scientifique 4ème série - Tome XIII 29 March 1900.
- La destruction des termites dans les pays tropicaux, La Nature 11 July 1903.
- Nouveau procédé de désinfection des bateaux : L'appareil clayton, La Nature 5 September 1903.
- La main-d'œuvre dans les mines d'or du sud de l'Afrique : La bière des cafres, La Nature 24 October 1903.
- Le chemin de fer du Cap au Caire, La Nature 28 November 1903.
- Le chat. Son utilité. La destruction des rats, éd. Ballière, 1930.
- À l’ombre de Pasteur, éd. Le mouvement sanitaire, 1938.
