= Jean Joseph Henri Toussaint =

French veterinarian

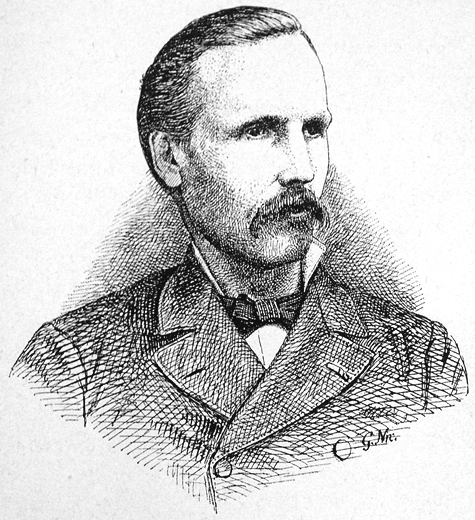
Jean Joseph Henri Toussaint.

Jean Joseph Henri Toussaint (30 April 1847 – 3 August 1890) was a French veterinarian born in Rouvres-la-Chétive, department of Vosges.

In 1869 he received his diploma from the school of veterinary medicine in Lyon. In 1876 he was appointed professor of anatomy, physiology and zoology at the veterinary school of Toulouse.

Toussaint is remembered for contributions made in the field of bacteriology. From his research, he conducted important investigations of chicken cholera, sepsis, and tuberculosis.

Probably, his most significant contribution was the development of a method of vaccination against anthrax. However, credit for creation of the anthrax vaccine went to Louis Pasteur, following Pasteur's celebrated demonstration with the vaccine on sheep at Pouilly-le-Fort from the May 5th to May 31st 1881. At Pouilly-le-Fort, Pasteur used a vaccine attenuated by potassium dichromate, employing a process similar to Toussaint's, who had published a means of attenuation by another antiseptic, carbolic acid. Pasteur never gave proper credit to Toussaint and his discovery. Pasteur's nephew, bacteriologist Adrien Loir (1862–1941) was aware of Toussaint's work with the vaccine, of which he documented in the 1938 treatise, A l'ombre de Pasteur ("In the Shadow of Pasteur").

From 1881, Toussaint was in declining health, reportedly from a nerve-related disease. He died on 3 August 1890 at the age of 43.
