= Louis Pasteur =

French chemist, pharmacist and microbiologist (1822–1895)

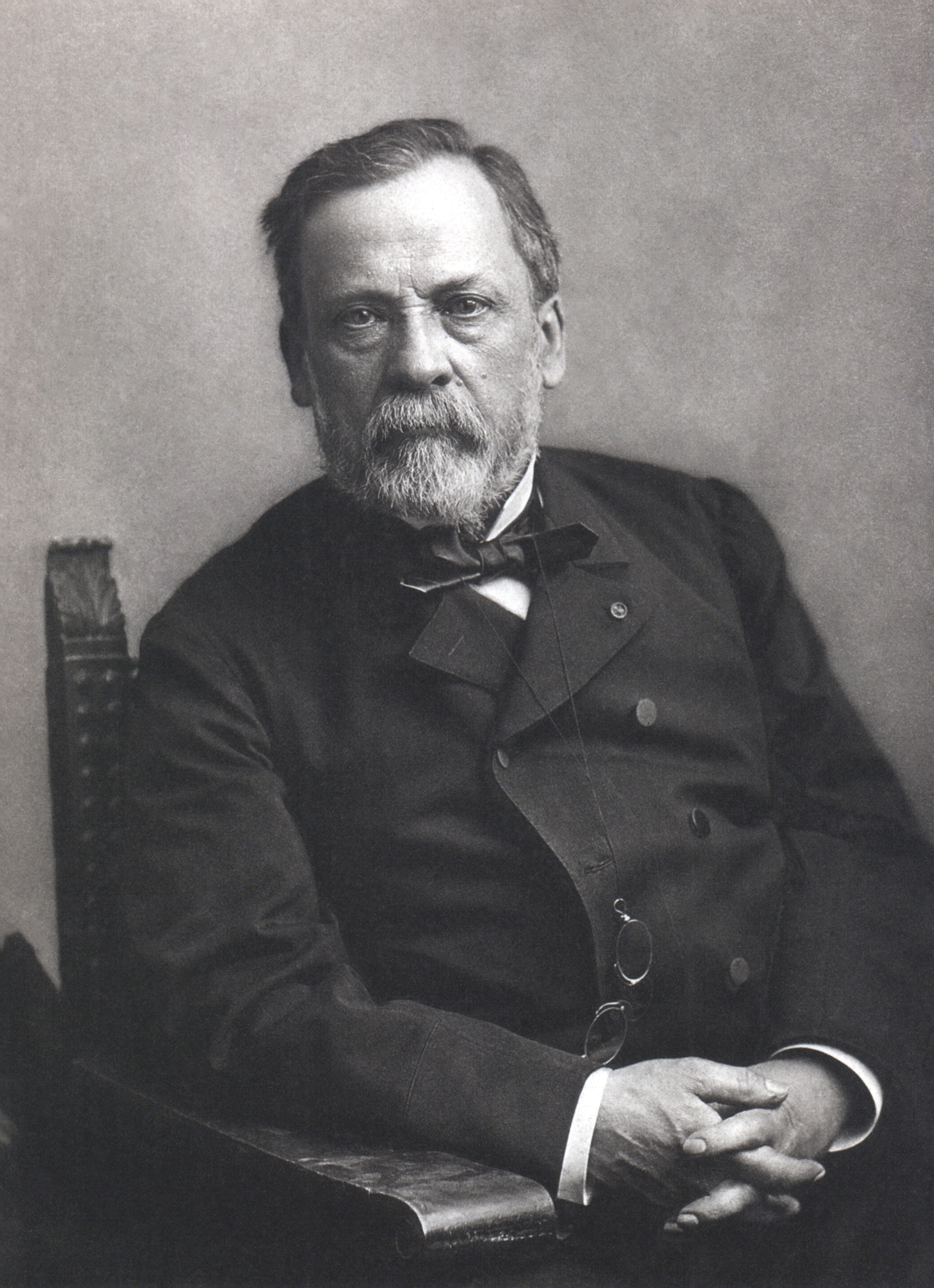
- Photograph by Nadar, 1895
- Born: 27 December 1822; Dole, France
- Died: 28 September 1895 (aged 72); Marnes-la-Coquette, France
- Education: École Normale Supérieure; University of Paris; Conservatoire national des arts et métiers
- Known for: Anthrax vaccine Cholera vaccine Rabies vaccine Chirality; Dextran; Fermentation theory Galactose; Germ theory of disease Kinetic resolution Koch–Pasteur rivalry Liebig–Pasteur dispute Pasteurization; Pasteur effect Pasteur pipette Pasteur–Chamberland filter Racemic acid Spontaneous generation Swan neck flask Stereochemistry; Zymology
- Spouse: Marie Laurent (m. 1849)
- Children: 5
- Awards: Legion of Honor Grand Cross (1881); Rumford Medal (1856); Copley Medal (1874); Albert Medal (1882); Cameron Prize for Therapeutics of the University of Edinburgh (1889); Leeuwenhoek Medal (1895); Order of the Medjidie
- Scientific career
- Fields: Biology; Microbiology; Chemistry; Mathematics; Physics
- Workplaces: University of Strasbourg; University of Lille; École Normale Supérieure; Pasteur Institute
- Theses: Recherches sur la capacité de saturation de l'acide arsénieux. Étude des arsénites de potasse, de soude et d'ammoniaque (1847); Études des phénomènes relatifs à la polarisation rotatoire des liquides. Application de la polarisation rotatoire des liquides à la solution de diverses questions de chimie (1847)
- Notable students: Charles Friedel

Louis Pasteur (/ˈluːi pæˈstɜːr/; French: [lwi pastœʁ]; 27 December 1822 – 28 September 1895) was a French chemist, pharmacist, and microbiologist renowned for his discoveries of the principles of vaccination, microbial fermentation, and pasteurization, the last of which was named after him. His research in chemistry led to remarkable breakthroughs in the understanding of the causes and prevention of diseases, which laid down the foundations of hygiene, public health and much of modern medicine. Pasteur's works are credited with saving millions of lives through the development of vaccines for rabies and anthrax. He is regarded as one of the founders of modern bacteriology and has been honored as the "father of bacteriology" and the "father of microbiology" (together with Robert Koch; the latter epithet also attributed to Antonie van Leeuwenhoek).

Pasteur was responsible for disproving the doctrine of spontaneous generation. Under the auspices of the French Academy of Sciences, his experiment demonstrated that in sterilized and sealed flasks, nothing ever developed; conversely, in sterilized but open flasks, microorganisms could grow. For this experiment, the academy awarded him the Alhumbert Prize carrying 2,500 francs in 1862.

Pasteur is also regarded as one of the fathers of the germ theory of diseases, which was a minor medical concept at the time. His many experiments showed that diseases could be prevented by killing or stopping germs, thereby directly supporting the germ theory and its application in clinical medicine. He is best known to the general public for his invention of the technique of treating milk and wine to stop bacterial contamination, a process now called pasteurization. Pasteur also made significant discoveries in chemistry, most notably on the molecular basis for the asymmetry of certain crystals and racemization. Early in his career, his investigation of sodium ammonium tartrate initiated the field of optical isomerism. This work had a profound effect on structural chemistry, with eventual implications for many areas including medicinal chemistry.

He was the director of the Pasteur Institute, established in 1887, until his death, and his body was interred in a vault beneath the institute. Although Pasteur made groundbreaking experiments, his reputation became associated with various controversies. Historical reassessment of his notebook revealed that he practiced deception to overcome his rivals.

== Early life and education ==
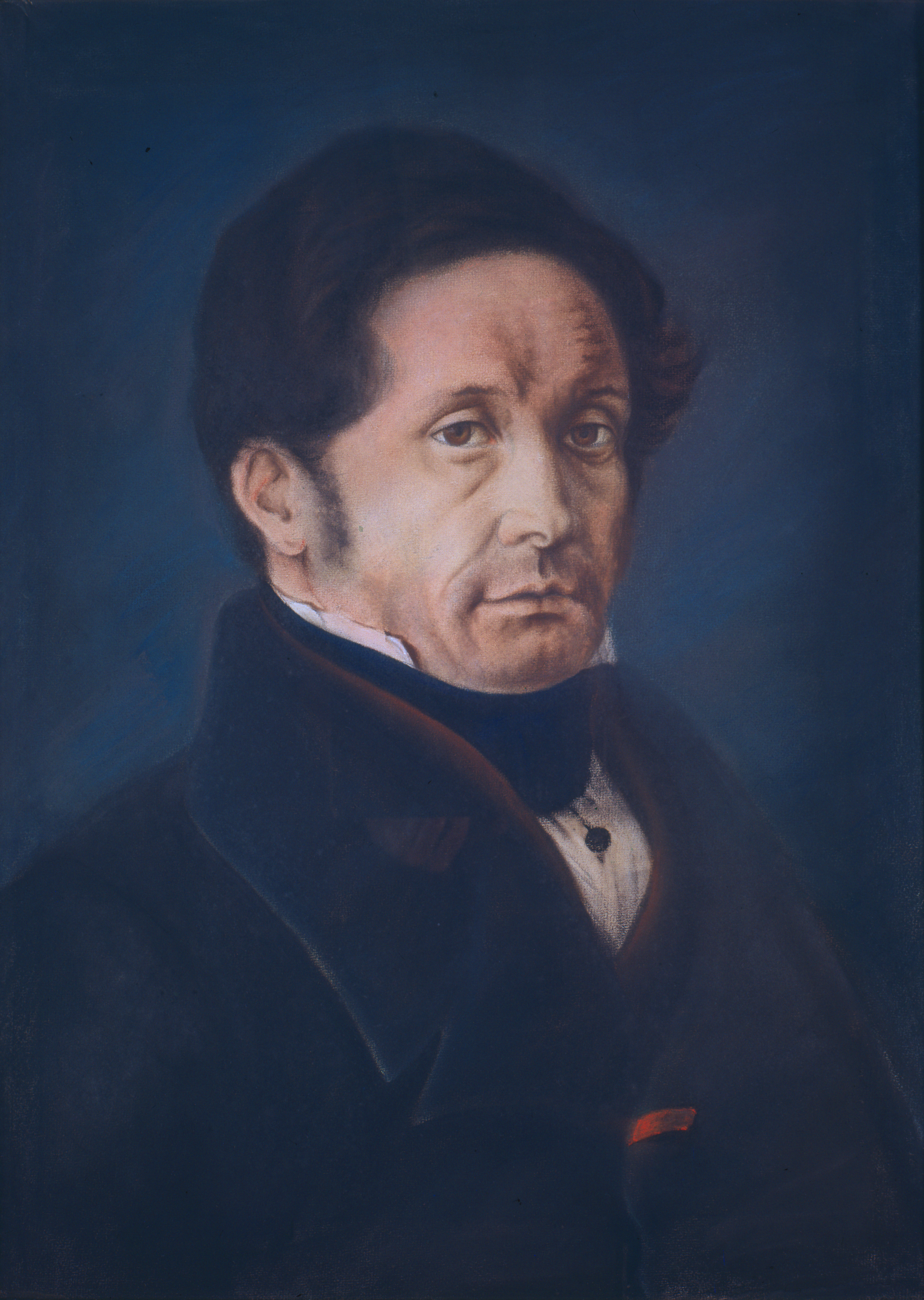
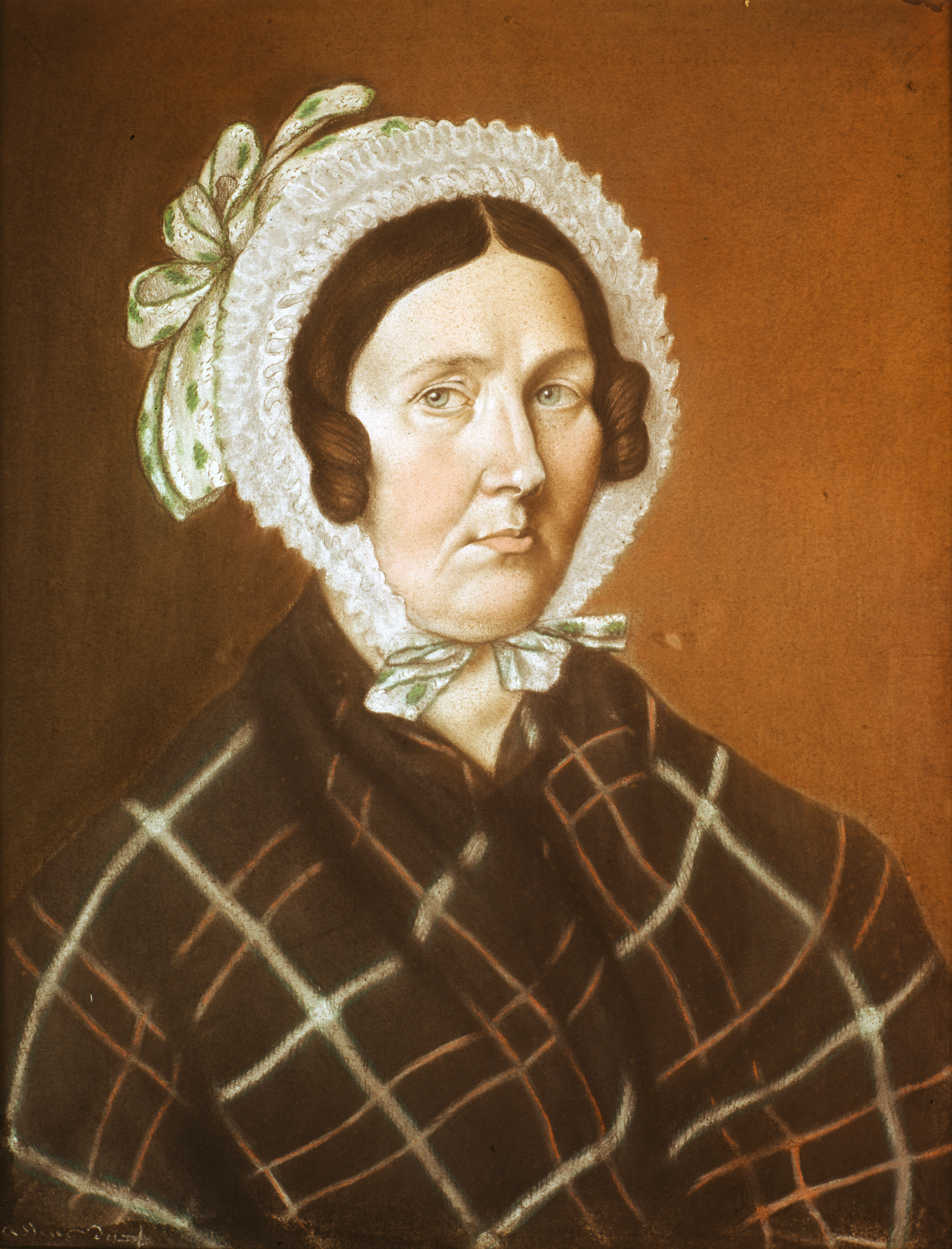
Portraits of Pasteur's parents, painted by himself

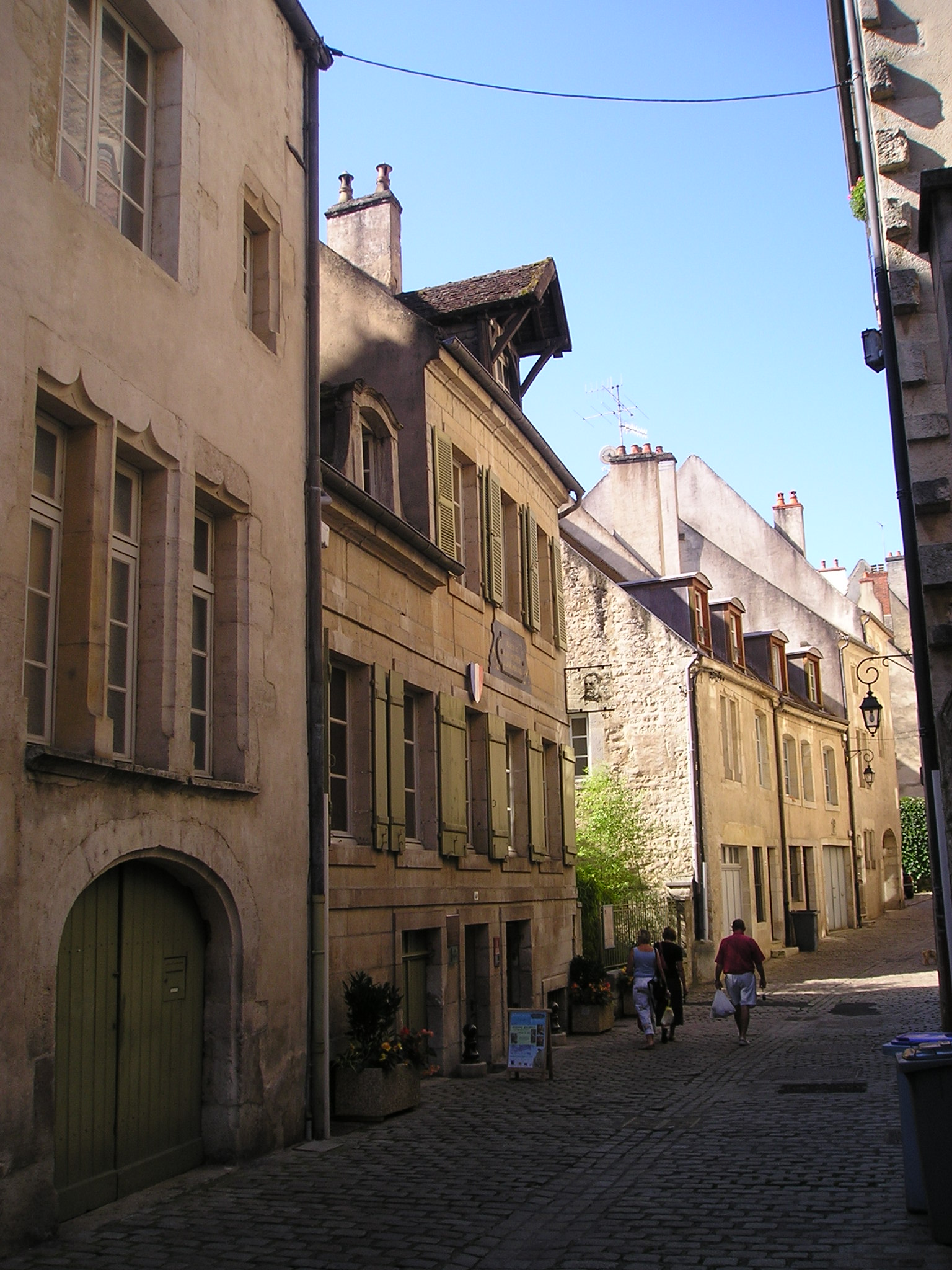
The house in which Pasteur was born, Dole

Louis Pasteur was born on 27 December 1822, in Dole, Jura, France, to a Catholic family of a poor tanner. He was the third child of Jean-Joseph Pasteur and Jeanne-Etiennette Roqui. The family moved to Marnoz in 1826 and then to Arbois in 1827. Pasteur entered primary school in 1831. He was dyslexic and dysgraphic.

He was an average student in his early years, and not particularly academic, as his interests were fishing and sketching. He drew many pastels and portraits of his parents, friends and neighbors. Pasteur attended secondary school at the Collège d'Arbois. In October 1838, he left for Paris to enroll in a boarding school, but became homesick and returned in November.

In 1839, he entered the Collège Royal at Besançon to study philosophy and earned his Bachelor of Letters degree in 1840. He was appointed a tutor at the Besançon college while continuing a degree science course with special mathematics. He failed his first examination in 1841. He managed to pass the baccalauréat scientifique (general science) degree from Dijon, where he earned his Bachelor of Science in Mathematics degree (Bachelier ès Sciences Mathématiques) in 1842, but with a mediocre grade in chemistry.

Later in 1842, Pasteur took the entrance test for the École Normale Supérieure. During the test, he had to fight fatigue and only felt comfortable with physics and mathematics. He passed the first set of tests, but because his ranking was low, Pasteur decided not to continue and try again next year. He went back to the Parisian boarding school to prepare for the test. He also attended classes at the Lycée Saint-Louis and lectures of Jean-Baptiste Dumas at the Sorbonne. In 1843, he passed the test with a high ranking and entered the École Normale Supérieure. Later, he was a student of Jean-Baptiste Boussingault at the Conservatoire national des arts et métiers. In 1845 he received the licencié ès sciences degree. In 1846, he was appointed professor of physics at the Collège de Tournon in Ardèche. But the chemist Antoine Jérôme Balard wanted him back at the École Normale Supérieure as a graduate laboratory assistant (agrégé préparateur). He joined Balard and simultaneously started his research in crystallography and in 1847, he submitted his two theses, one in chemistry and the other in physics: (a) Chemistry Thesis: "Recherches sur la capacité de saturation de l'acide arsénieux. Etudes des arsénites de potasse, de soude et d'ammoniaque."; (b) Physics Thesis: "1. Études des phénomènes relatifs à la polarisation rotatoire des liquides. 2. Application de la polarisation rotatoire des liquides à la solution de diverses questions de chimie."

After serving briefly as professor of physics at the Dijon Lycée in 1848, he became professor of chemistry at the University of Strasbourg, where he met and courted Marie Laurent, daughter of the university's rector in 1849. They were married on 29 May 1849, and together had five children, only two of whom survived to adulthood; the other three died of typhoid.

== Career ==
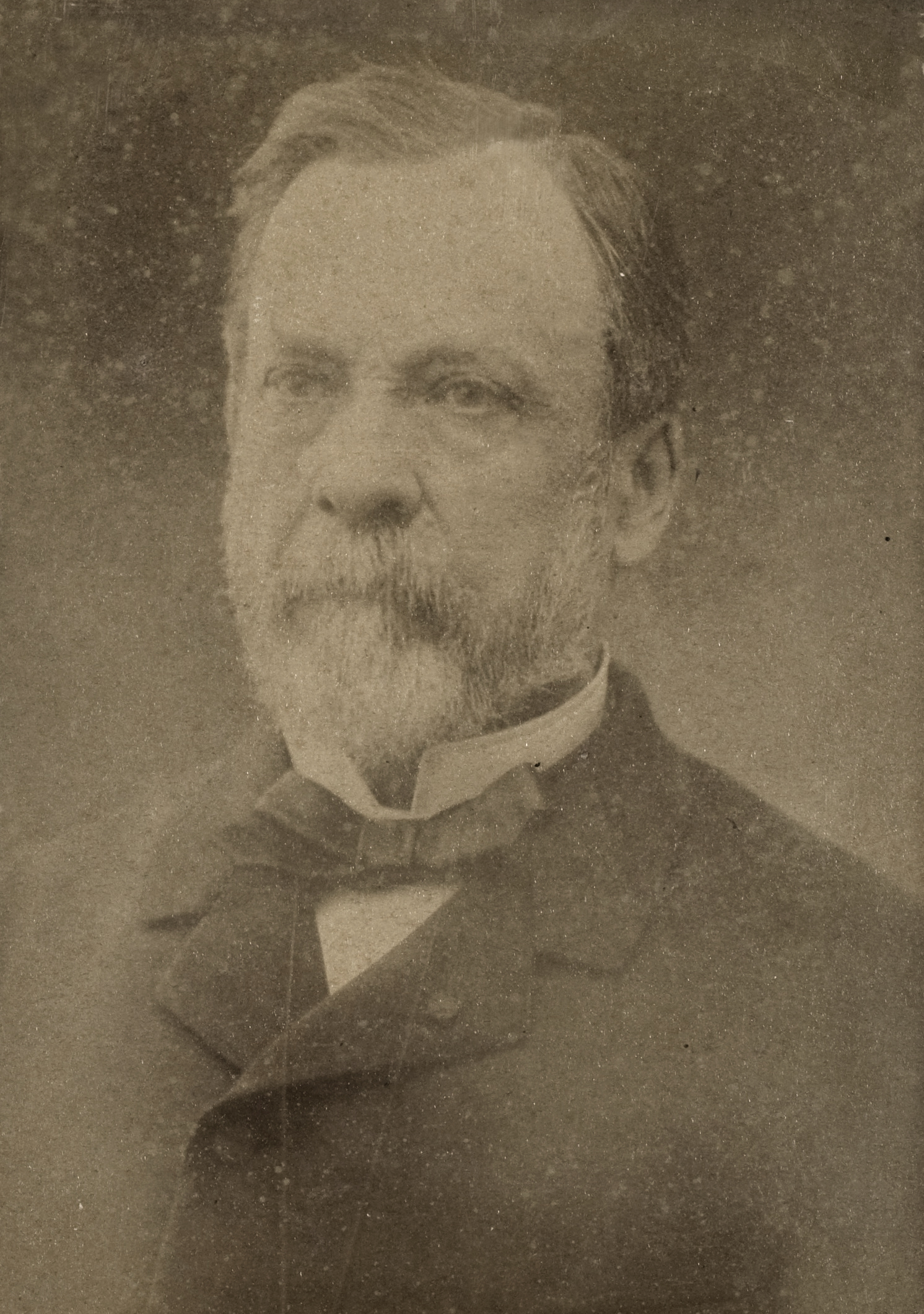
Louis Pasteur, French biologist and chemist, 1878, by A Gerschel

Pasteur was appointed professor of chemistry at the University of Strasbourg in 1848, and became the chair of chemistry in 1852.

In February 1854, so that he would have time to carry out work that could earn him the title of correspondent of the Institute, he got three months' paid leave with the help of a medical certificate of convenience. He extended the leave until 1 August, the date of the start of the exams. "I tell the Minister that I will go and do the examinations so as not to increase the embarrassment of the service. It is also so as not to leave to another a sum of 6 or 700 francs".

In this same year 1854, he was named dean of the new faculty of sciences at University of Lille, where he began his studies on fermentation. It was on this occasion that Pasteur uttered his oft-quoted remark: "dans les champs de l'observation, le hasard ne favorise que les esprits préparés" ("In the field of observation, chance favors only the prepared mind").

In 1857, he moved to Paris as the director of scientific studies at the École Normale Supérieure where he took control from 1858 to 1867 and introduced a series of reforms to improve the standard of scientific work. The examinations became more rigid, which led to better results, greater competition, and increased prestige. Many of his decrees, however, were rigid and authoritarian, leading to two serious student revolts. During "the bean revolt" he decreed that a mutton stew, which students had refused to eat, would be served and eaten every Monday. On another occasion he threatened to expel any student caught smoking, and 73 of the 80 students in the school resigned.

In 1863, he was appointed professor of geology, physics, and chemistry at the École nationale supérieure des Beaux-Arts, a position he held until his resignation in 1867. In 1867, he became the chair of organic chemistry at the Sorbonne, but he later gave up the position because of poor health. In 1867, the École Normale's laboratory of physiological chemistry was created at Pasteur's request, and he was the laboratory's director from 1867 to 1888. In Paris, he established the Pasteur Institute in 1887 and served as its director for the rest of his life.

== Research ==
=== Molecular asymmetry ===
Pasteur separated the left and right crystal shapes from each other to form two piles of crystals: in solution one form rotated light to the left, the other to the right, while an equal mixture of the two forms canceled each other's effect, and does not rotate the polarized light.

In Pasteur's early work as a chemist, beginning at the École Normale Supérieure, and continuing at Strasbourg and Lille, he examined the chemical, optical and crystallographic properties of a group of compounds known as tartrates.

He resolved a problem concerning the nature of tartaric acid in 1848. A solution of this compound derived from living things rotated the plane of polarization of light passing through it. The problem was that tartaric acid derived by chemical synthesis had no such effect, even though its chemical reactions were identical and its elemental composition was the same.

Pasteur noticed that crystals of tartrates had small faces. Then he observed that, in racemic mixtures of tartrates, half of the crystals were right-handed and half were left-handed. In solution, the right-handed compound was dextrorotatory, and the left-handed one was levorotatory. Pasteur determined that optical activity related to the shape of the crystals, and that an asymmetric internal arrangement of the molecules of the compound was responsible for twisting the light. The (2R,3R)- and (2S,3S)- tartrates were isometric, non-superposable mirror images of each other. This was the first time anyone had demonstrated molecular chirality, and also the first explanation of isomerism.

Some historians consider Pasteur's work in this area to be his "most profound and most original contributions to science", and his "greatest scientific discovery."

=== Fermentation and germ theory of diseases ===
Pasteur was motivated to investigate fermentation while working at Lille. In 1856 a local wine manufacturer, M. Bigot, whose son was one of Pasteur's students, sought for his advice on the problems of making beetroot alcohol and souring. Pasteur began his research in the topic by repeating and confirming works of Theodor Schwann, who demonstrated a decade earlier that yeast were alive.

According to his son-in-law, René Vallery-Radot, in August 1857 Pasteur sent a paper about lactic acid fermentation to the Société des Sciences de Lille, but the paper was read three months later. A memoire was subsequently published on 30 November 1857. In the memoir, he developed his ideas stating that: "I intend to establish that, just as there is an alcoholic ferment, the yeast of beer, which is found everywhere that sugar is decomposed into alcohol and carbonic acid, so also there is a particular ferment, a lactic yeast, always present when sugar becomes lactic acid."

This memoir on alcoholic fermentation was published in full form in 1858. Jöns Jacob Berzelius and Justus von Liebig had proposed the theory that fermentation was caused by decomposition. Pasteur demonstrated that this theory was incorrect, and that yeast was responsible for fermentation to produce alcohol from sugar. He also demonstrated that, when a different microorganism contaminated the wine, lactic acid was produced, making the wine sour. In 1861, Pasteur observed that less sugar fermented per part of yeast when the yeast was exposed to air. The lower rate of fermentation aerobically became known as the Pasteur effect.

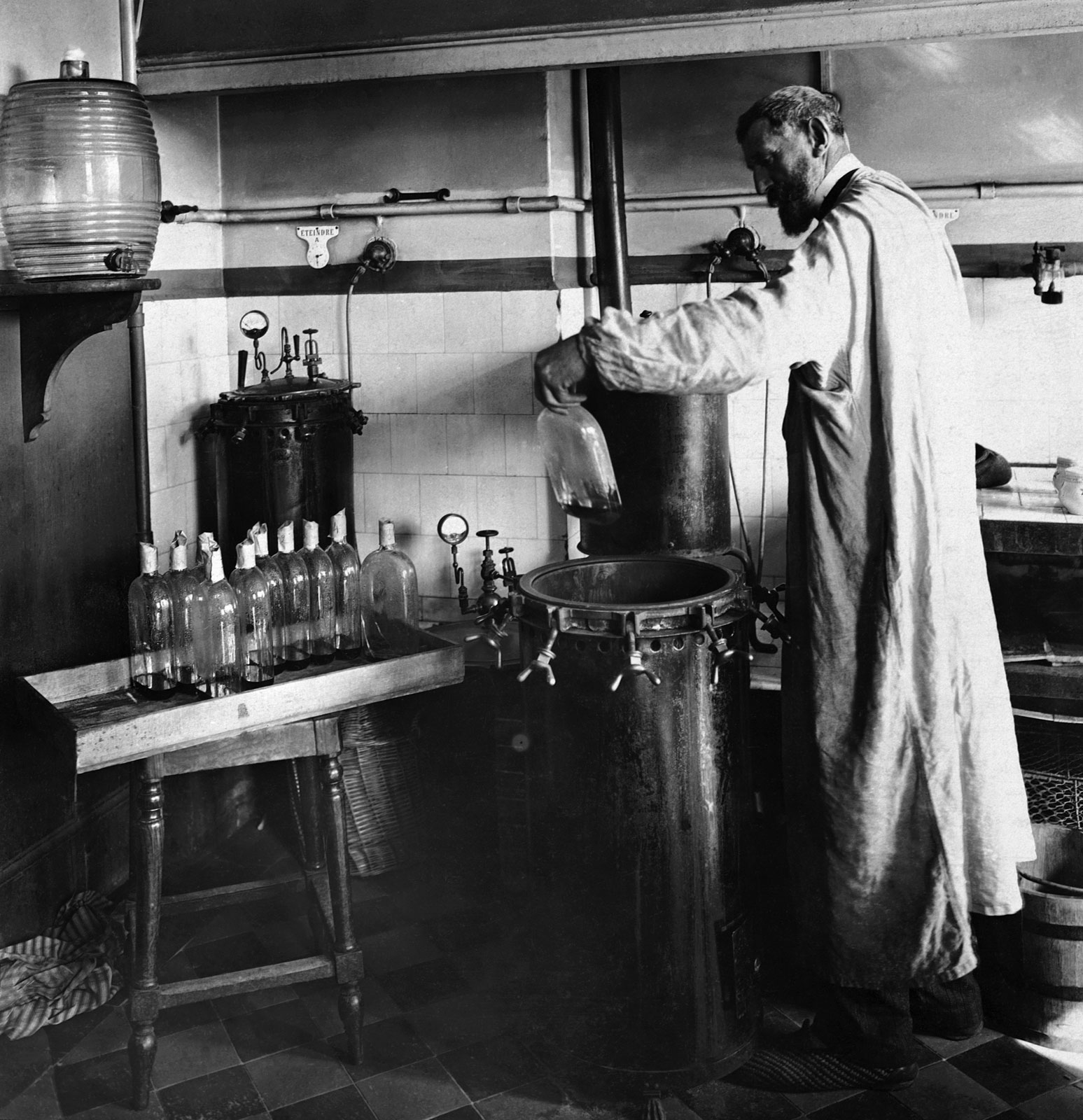
Pasteur experimenting in his laboratory

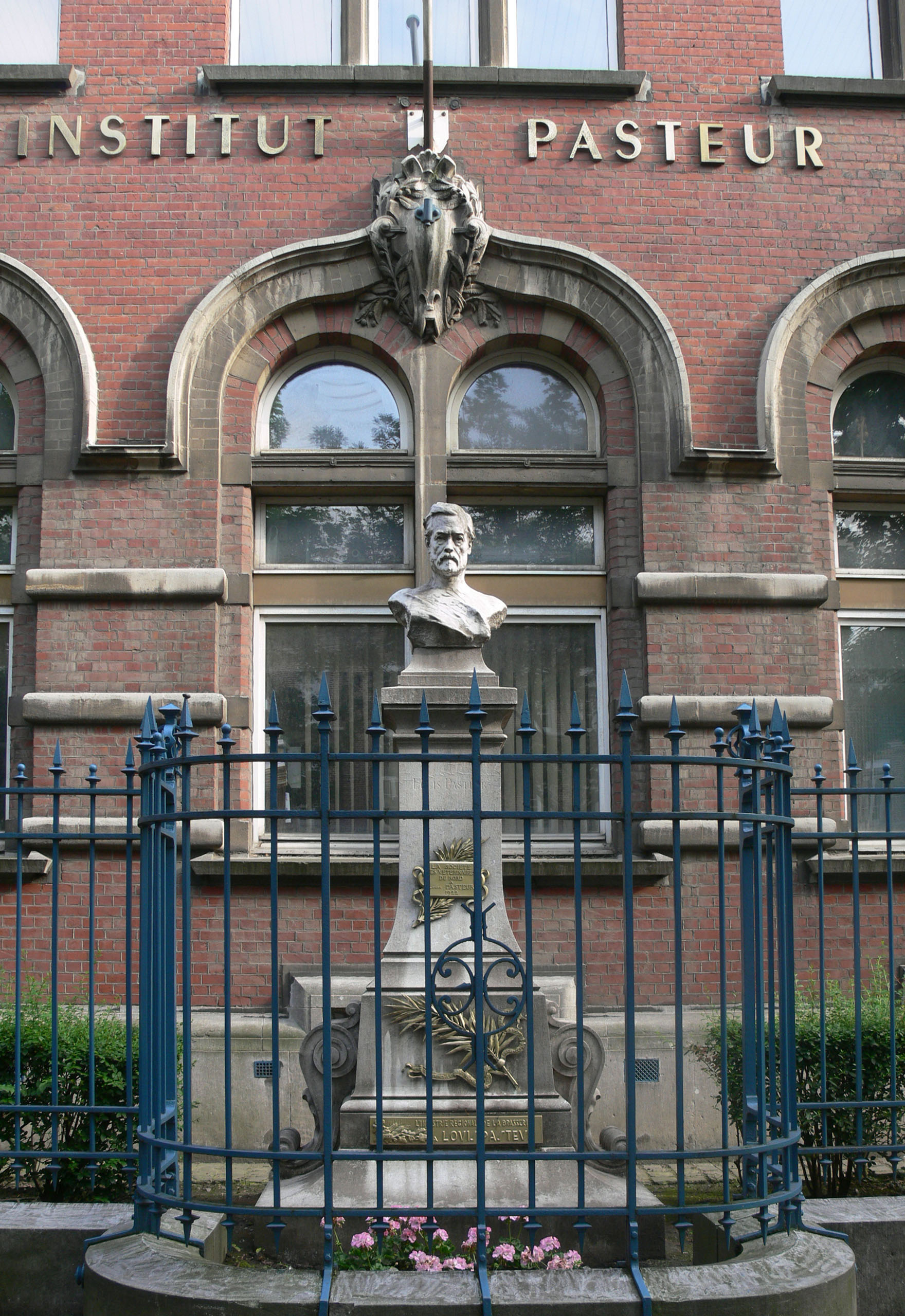
Institut Pasteur de Lille

Pasteur's research also showed that the growth of micro-organisms was responsible for spoiling beverages, such as beer, wine and milk. With this established, he invented a process in which liquids such as milk were heated to a temperature between 60 and 100 °C (140 and 212 °F). This killed most bacteria and moulds already present within them. Pasteur and Claude Bernard completed tests on blood and urine on 20 April 1862. Pasteur patented the process, to fight the "diseases" of wine, in 1865. The method became known as pasteurization, and was soon applied to beer and milk.

Beverage contamination led Pasteur to the idea that micro-organisms infecting animals and humans cause disease. He proposed preventing the entry of micro-organisms into the human body, leading Joseph Lister to develop antiseptic methods in surgery.

In 1866, Pasteur published Études sur le Vin, about the diseases of wine, and he published Études sur la Bière in 1876, concerning the diseases of beer.

In the early 19th century, Agostino Bassi had shown that muscardine was caused by a fungus that infected silkworms. Since 1853, two diseases called pébrine and flacherie had been infecting great numbers of silkworms in southern France, and by 1865 they were causing huge losses to farmers. In 1865, Pasteur went to Alès and worked for five years until 1870.

Silkworms with pébrine were covered in corpuscles. In the first three years, Pasteur thought that the corpuscles were a symptom of the disease. In 1870, he concluded that the corpuscles were the cause of pébrine (it is now known that the cause is a microsporidian). Pasteur also showed that the disease was hereditary. Pasteur developed a system to prevent pébrine: after the female moths laid their eggs, the moths were turned into a pulp. The pulp was examined with a microscope, and if corpuscles were observed, the eggs were destroyed. Pasteur concluded that bacteria caused flacherie. The primary cause is currently thought to be viruses. The spread of flacherie could be accidental or hereditary. Hygiene could be used to prevent accidental flacherie. Moths whose digestive cavities did not contain the microorganisms causing flacherie were used to lay eggs, preventing hereditary flacherie.

=== Spontaneous generation ===
Bottle en col de cygne (swan-neck bottle) used by Pasteur

Louis Pasteur's pasteurization experiment illustrates the fact that the spoilage of liquid was caused by particles in the air rather than the air itself. These experiments were important pieces of evidence supporting the germ theory of disease.

Following his fermentation experiments, Pasteur demonstrated that the skin of grapes was the natural source of yeasts, and that sterilized grapes and grape juice never fermented. He drew grape juice from under the skin with sterilized needles, and also covered grapes with sterilized cloth. Both experiments could not produce wine in sterilized containers.

His findings and ideas were against the prevailing notion of spontaneous generation. He received a particularly stern criticism from Félix Archimède Pouchet, who was director of the Rouen Museum of Natural History. To settle the debate between the eminent scientists, the French Academy of Sciences offered the Alhumbert Prize carrying 2,500 francs to whoever could experimentally demonstrate for or against the doctrine.

Pouchet stated that air everywhere could cause spontaneous generation of living organisms in liquids. In the late 1850s, he performed experiments and claimed that they were evidence of spontaneous generation. Francesco Redi and Lazzaro Spallanzani had provided some evidence against spontaneous generation in the 17th and 18th centuries, respectively. Spallanzani's experiments in 1765 suggested that air contaminated broths with bacteria. In the 1860s, Pasteur repeated Spallanzani's experiments, but Pouchet reported a different result using a different broth.

Pasteur performed several experiments to disprove spontaneous generation. He placed boiled liquid in a flask and let hot air enter the flask. Then he closed the flask, and no organisms grew in it. In another experiment, when he opened flasks containing boiled liquid, dust entered the flasks, causing organisms to grow in some of them. The number of flasks in which organisms grew was lower at higher altitudes, showing that air at high altitudes contained less dust and fewer organisms. Pasteur also used swan neck flasks containing a fermentable liquid. Air was allowed to enter the flask via a long curving tube that made dust particles stick to it. Nothing grew in the broths unless the flasks were tilted, making the liquid touch the contaminated walls of the neck. This showed that the living organisms that grew in such broths came from outside, on dust, rather than spontaneously generating within the liquid or from the action of pure air.

These were some of the most important experiments disproving the theory of spontaneous generation. Pasteur gave a series of five presentations of his findings before the French Academy of Sciences in 1881, which were published in 1882 as Mémoire Sur les corpuscules organisés qui existent dans l'atmosphère: Examen de la doctrine des générations spontanées (Account of Organized Corpuscles Existing in the Atmosphere: Examining the Doctrine of Spontaneous Generation). Pasteur won the Alhumbert Prize in 1862. He concluded that:

Never will the doctrine of spontaneous generation recover from the mortal blow of this simple experiment. There is no known circumstance in which it can be confirmed that microscopic beings came into the world without germs, without parents similar to themselves.

=== Silkworm disease ===
In 1865, Jean-Baptiste Dumas, chemist, senator and former Minister of Agriculture and Commerce, asked Pasteur to study a new disease that was decimating silkworm farms from the south of France and Europe, the pébrine, characterized on a macroscopic scale by black spots and on a microscopic scale by the "Cornalia corpuscles". Pasteur accepted and made five long stays in Alès, between 7 June 1865 and 1869.

==== Initial errors ====
Arriving in Alès, Pasteur familiarized himself with pébrine and also with another disease of the silkworm, known earlier than pebrine: flacherie or dead-flat disease. Contrary, for example, to Quatrefages, who coined the new word pébrine, Pasteur made the mistake of believing that the two diseases were the same and even that most of the diseases of silkworms known up to that time were identical with each other and with pébrine. It was in letters of 30 April and 21 May 1867 to Dumas that he first made the distinction between pébrine and flacherie.

He made another mistake: he began by denying the "parasitic" (microbial) nature of pébrine, which several scholars (notably Antoine Béchamp) considered well established. Even a note published on 27 August 1866 by Balbiani, which Pasteur at first seemed to welcome favourably had no effect, at least immediately. "Pasteur is mistaken. He would only change his mind in the course of 1867".

==== Victory over pébrine ====
At a time when Pasteur had not yet understood the cause of the pébrine, he propagated an effective process to stop infections: a sample of chrysalises was chosen, they were crushed and the corpuscles were searched for in the crushed material; if the proportion of corpuscular pupae in the sample was very low, the chamber was considered good for reproduction. This method of sorting "seeds" (eggs) is close to a method that Osimo had proposed a few years earlier, but whose trials had not been conclusive. By this process, Pasteur curbed pébrine and saved much of the silk industry in the Cévennes.

==== Flacherie resists ====
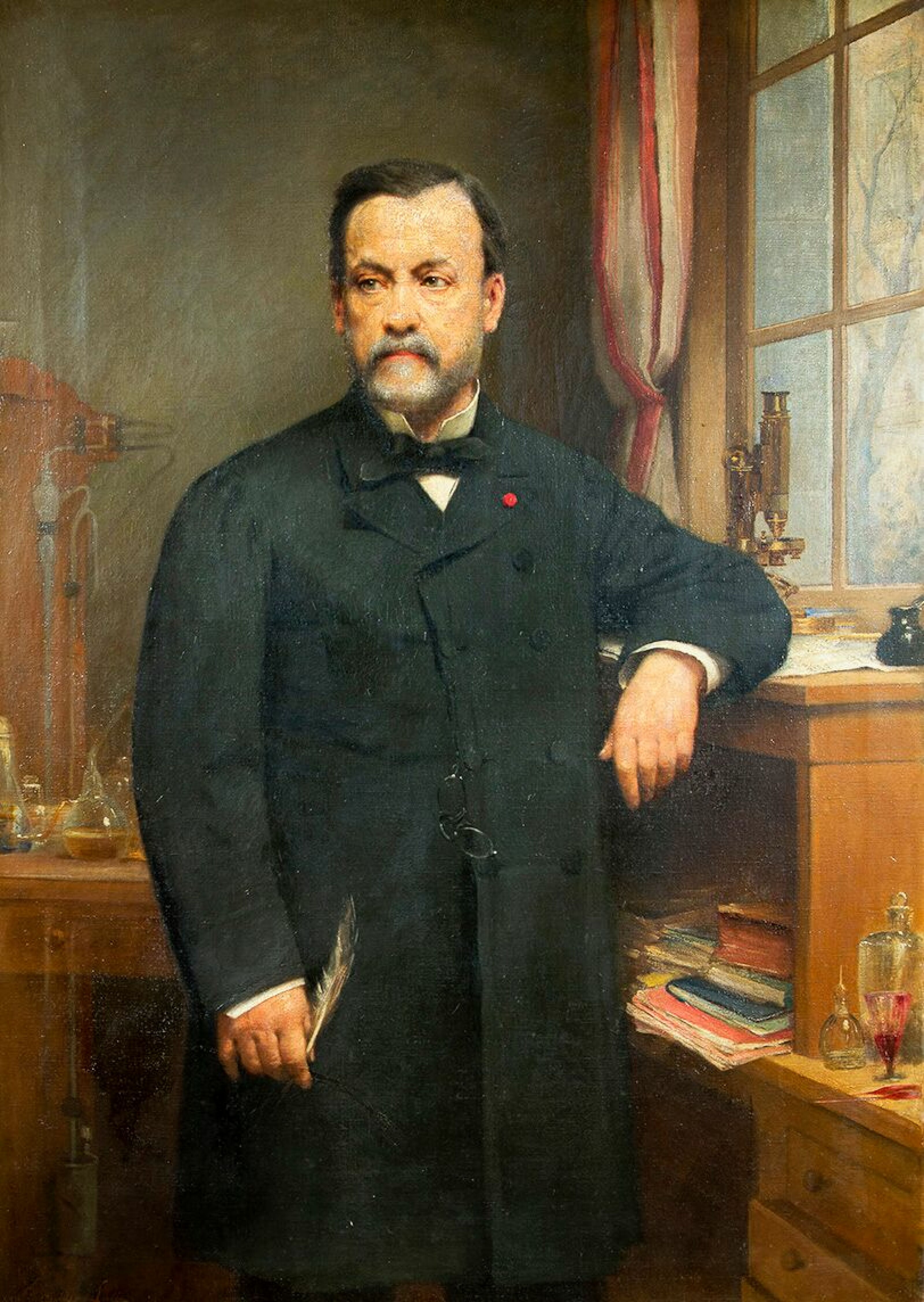
Portrait of Louis Pasteur by François Lafon (1883)

In 1878, at the Congrès international séricicole, Pasteur admitted that "if pébrine is overcome, flacherie still exerts its ravages". He attributed the persistence of flacherie to the fact that the farmers had not followed his advice.

In 1884, Balbiani, who disregarded the theoretical value of Pasteur's work on silkworm diseases, acknowledged that his practical process had remedied the ravages of pébrine, but added that this result tended to be counterbalanced by the development of flacherie, which was less well known and more difficult to prevent.

Despite Pasteur's success against pébrine, French sericulture had not been saved from damage. (See fr:Sériciculture in the French Wikipedia.)

=== Immunology and vaccination ===
==== Chicken cholera ====
Pasteur's first work on vaccine development was on chicken cholera. He received the bacteria samples (later called Pasteurella multocida after him) from Henry Toussaint. Being unable to conduct the experiments himself due to a stroke in 1868, Pasteur relied heavily on his assistants Emile Roux and Charles Chamberland. The work with chicken cholera was initiated in 1877, and by the next year, Roux was able to maintain a stable culture using broths. As documented later by Pasteur in his notebook in March 1880, in October 1879, being delayed in returning to the laboratory due to his daughter's wedding and ill health, he instructed Roux to start a new chicken cholera culture using bacteria from a culture that had sat since July. The two chickens inoculated with this new culture showed some symptoms of infection, but instead of the infections being fatal, as they usually were, the chickens recovered completely. After further incubation of the culture for an additional 8 days, Roux again inoculated the same two chickens. As was also noted by Pasteur in his notebook in March 1880, and contrary to some accounts, this time the chickens died. Thus, although the attenuated bacteria did not provide immunity, these experiments provided important clues as to how bacteria could be artificially attenuated in the laboratory. As a result, upon Pasteur's return to the laboratory, the focus of the research was directed at creating a vaccine through attenuation.

In February 1880, Pasteur presented his results to the French Academy of Sciences as "Sur les maladies virulentes et en particulier sur la maladie appelée vulgairement choléra des poules (On virulent diseases, and in particular on the disease commonly called chicken cholera)" and published it in the academy's journal (Comptes-Rendus hebdomadaires des séances de l'Académie des Sciences). He attributed that the bacteria were weakened by contact with oxygen. He explained that bacteria kept in sealed containers never lost their virulence, and only those exposed to air in culture media could be used as vaccine. Pasteur introduced the term "attenuation" for this weakening of virulence as he presented before the academy, saying:

We can diminish the microbe's virulence by changing the mode of culturing. This is the crucial point of my subject. I ask the Academy not to criticize, for the time being, the confidence of my proceedings that permit me to determine the microbe's attenuation, in order to save the independence of my studies and to better assure their progress... [In conclusion] I would like to point out to the Academy two main consequences to the facts presented: the hope to culture all microbes and to find a vaccine for all infectious diseases that have repeatedly afflicted humanity, and are a major burden on agriculture and breeding of domestic animals.

In fact, Pasteur's vaccine against chicken cholera did not consistently produce immunity, and has subsequently been proven to be ineffective.

==== Anthrax ====
Following the results with chicken cholera, Pasteur eventually utilized the immunization method developed for chicken cholera to create a vaccine for anthrax, which affected cattle. In 1877, Pasteur had earlier directed his laboratory to culture the bacteria from the blood of infected animals, following the discovery of the bacterium by Robert Koch.

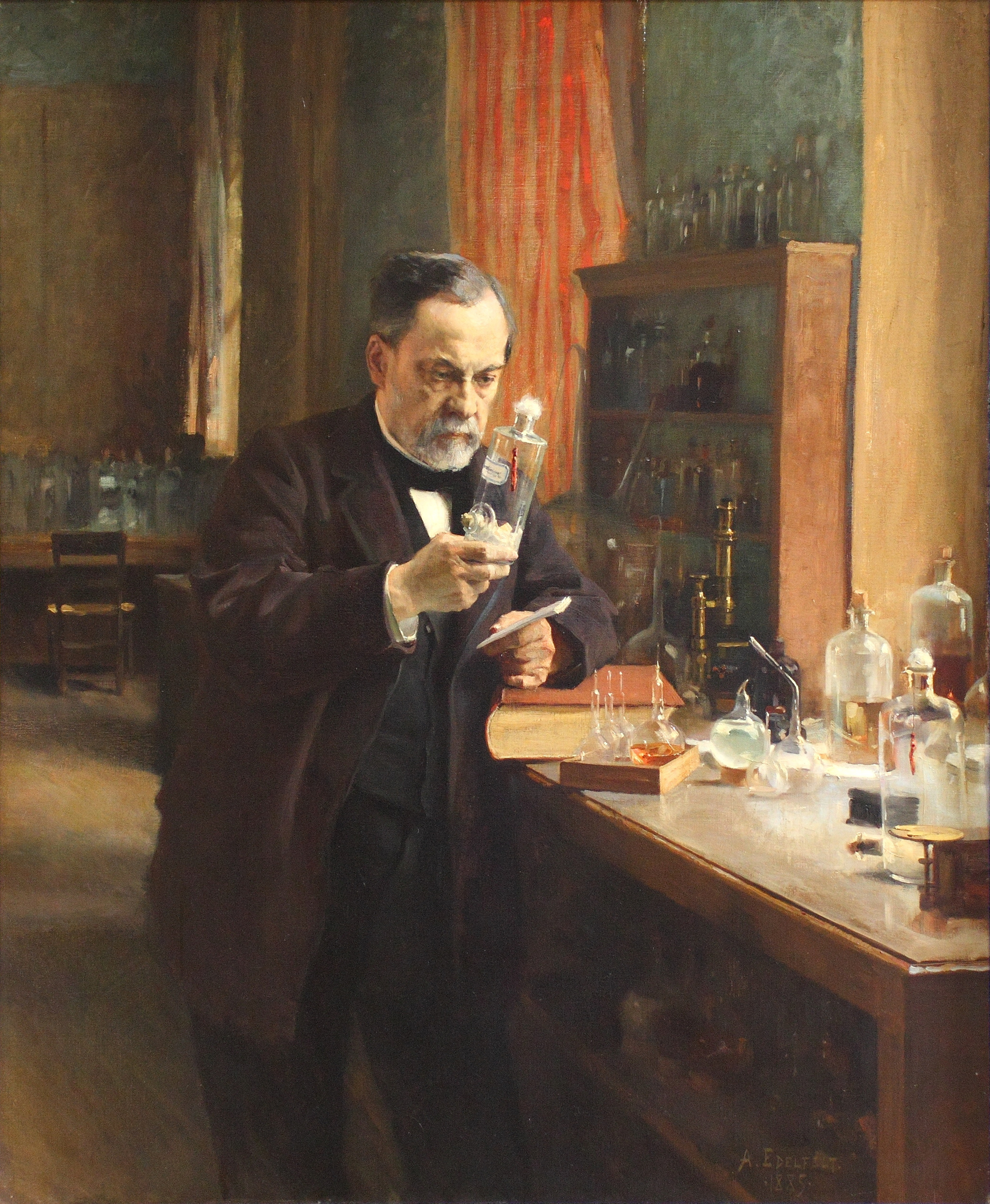
Louis Pasteur in his laboratory, painting by A. Edelfeldt in 1885

When animals were infected with the bacteria, anthrax occurred, proving that the bacteria was the cause of the disease. Many cattle were dying of anthrax in "cursed fields". Pasteur was told that sheep that died from anthrax were buried in the field. Pasteur thought that earthworms might have brought the bacteria to the surface. He found anthrax bacteria in earthworms' excrement, showing that he was correct. He told the farmers not to bury dead animals in the fields.

Pasteur's interest in creating a vaccine for anthrax was greatly stimulated when on 12 July 1880, Henri Bouley read before the French Academy of Sciences a report from Henry Toussaint, a veterinary surgeon, who was not a member of the academy. Toussaint had developed anthrax vaccine by killing the bacilli by heating at 55 °C for 10 minutes. He tested his vaccine on eight dogs and 11 sheep, half of which died after inoculation. It was not a great success. Upon hearing the news, Pasteur immediately wrote to the academy that he could not believe that dead vaccine would work and that Toussaint's claim "overturns all the ideas I had on viruses, vaccines, etc." Following Pasteur's criticism, Toussaint switched to carbolic acid (phenol) to kill anthrax bacilli and tested the vaccine on sheep in August 1880. Pasteur thought that this type of killed vaccine should not work because he believed that attenuated bacteria used up nutrients that the bacteria needed to grow. He thought oxidizing bacteria when sitting in culture broth for prolonged periods made them less virulent.

However, Pasteur's laboratory found that anthrax bacillus was not easily weakened by culturing in air as it formed spores – unlike chicken cholera bacillus. In early 1881, his laboratory discovered that growing anthrax bacilli at about 42 °C made them unable to produce spores, and he described this method in a speech to the French Academy of Sciences on 28 February. On 21 March, despite inconsistent results, he announced successful vaccination of sheep. To this news, veterinarian Hippolyte Rossignol proposed that the Société d'agriculture de Melun organize an experiment to test Pasteur's vaccine. Pasteur signed an agreement accepting the challenge on 28 April. Pasteur's assistants, Roux and Chamberland, who were assigned the task of conducting the trial, were concerned about the unreliability of the attenuated vaccine, and therefore Chamberland secretly prepared an alternative vaccine using chemical inactivation. Without divulging their method of preparing the vaccine to anyone but Pasteur, Roux and Chamberland performed the public experiment on May at Pouilly-le-Fort. 58 sheep, 2 goats and 10 cattle were used, half of which were given the vaccine on 5 and 17 May; while the other half was untreated. On 31 May, Roux and Chamberland next injected the animals with the fresh virulent culture of anthrax bacillus. The official result was observed and analyzed on 2 June in the presence of over 200 spectators, with Pasteur himself in attendance. The results were as Pasteur had bravely predicted: "I hypothesized that the six vaccinated cows would not become very ill, while the four unvaccinated cows would perish or at least become very ill." However, all vaccinated sheep and goats survived, while unvaccinated ones had died or were dying before the viewers. His report to the French Academy of Sciences on 13 June concludes:

[By] looking at everything from the scientific point of view, the development of a vaccination against anthrax constitutes significant progress beyond the first vaccine developed by Jenner, since the latter had never been obtained experimentally.

Pasteur did not directly disclose how he prepared the vaccines used at Pouilly-le-Fort. Although his report indicated it as a "live vaccine", his laboratory notebooks show that he actually used potassium dichromate-killed vaccine, as developed by Chamberland, quite similar to Toussaint's method.

The notion of a weak form of a disease causing immunity to the virulent version was not new; this had been known for a long time for smallpox. Inoculation with smallpox (variolation) was known to result in a much less severe disease, and greatly reduced mortality, in comparison with the naturally acquired disease. Edward Jenner had also studied vaccination using cowpox (vaccinia) to give cross-immunity to smallpox in the late 1790s, and by the early 1800s vaccination had spread to most of Europe.

The difference between smallpox vaccination and anthrax or chicken cholera vaccination was that the latter two disease organisms had been artificially weakened, so a naturally weak form of the disease organism did not need to be found. Pasteur's development of artificially weakened pathogens revolutionized work in infectious diseases, and he gave these artificially weakened diseases the generic name of "vaccines", in honour of Jenner's discovery.

In 1876, Robert Koch had shown that Bacillus anthracis caused anthrax. In his papers published between 1878 and 1880, Pasteur only mentioned Koch's work in a footnote. Koch met Pasteur at the Seventh International Medical Congress in 1881. A few months later, Koch wrote that Pasteur had used impure cultures and made errors. In 1882, Pasteur replied to Koch in a speech, to which Koch responded aggressively. Koch stated that Pasteur tested his vaccine on unsuitable animals and that Pasteur's research was not properly scientific. In 1882, Koch wrote "On the Anthrax Inoculation", in which he refuted several of Pasteur's conclusions about anthrax and criticized Pasteur for keeping his methods secret, jumping to conclusions, and being imprecise. In 1883, Pasteur wrote that he used cultures prepared in a similar way to his successful fermentation experiments and that Koch misinterpreted statistics and ignored Pasteur's work on silkworms.

==== Swine erysipelas ====
In 1882, Pasteur sent his assistant Louis Thuillier to southern France because of an epizootic of swine erysipelas. Thuillier identified the bacillus that caused the disease in March 1883. Pasteur and Thuillier increased the bacillus's virulence after passing it through pigeons. Then they passed the bacillus through rabbits, weakening it and obtaining a vaccine. Pasteur and Thuillier incorrectly described the bacterium as a figure-eight shape. Roux described the bacterium as stick-shaped in 1884.

==== Rabies ====
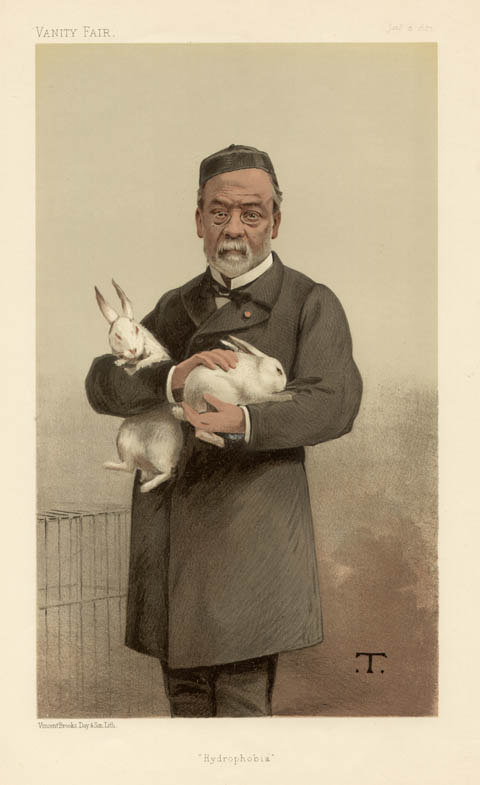
Captioned "Hydrophobia", caricature of Pasteur in the London magazine Vanity Fair, January 1887

Pasteur's laboratory produced the first vaccine for rabies using a method developed by his assistant Roux, which involved growing the virus in rabbits, and then weakening it by drying the affected nerve tissue. The rabies vaccine was initially created by Emile Roux, a French doctor and a colleague of Pasteur, who had produced a killed vaccine using this method. Pasteur wrote that the vaccine had been tested in 50 dogs before its first human trial. This vaccine was used on 9-year-old Joseph Meister, on 6 July 1885, after the boy was badly mauled by a rabid dog. This was done at some personal risk for Pasteur, since he was not a licensed physician and could have faced prosecution for treating the boy. After consulting with physicians, he decided to go ahead with the treatment. Over 11 days, Meister received 13 inoculations, each inoculation using viruses that had been weakened for a shorter period of time. Three months later he examined Meister and found that he was in good health. Pasteur was hailed as a hero and the legal matter was not pursued. Analysis of his laboratory notebooks shows that Pasteur had treated two people before his vaccination of Meister. One survived but may not actually have had rabies, and the other died of rabies. Pasteur began treatment of Jean-Baptiste Jupille on 20 October 1885, and the treatment was successful. Later in 1885, people, including four children from the United States, went to Pasteur's laboratory to be inoculated. In 1886, he treated 350 people, of which only one developed rabies. The treatment's success laid the foundations for the manufacture of many other vaccines. The first of the Pasteur Institutes was also built on the basis of this achievement.

In The Story of San Michele, Axel Munthe writes of some risks Pasteur undertook in the rabies vaccine research:

Pasteur himself was absolutely fearless. Anxious to secure a sample of saliva straight from the jaws of a rabid dog, I once saw him with the glass tube held between his lips draw a few drops of the deadly saliva from the mouth of a rabid bull-dog, held on the table by two assistants, their hands protected by leather gloves.

Because of his study in germs, Pasteur encouraged doctors to sanitize their hands and equipment before surgery. Prior to this, few doctors or their assistants practiced these procedures. Ignaz Semmelweis and Joseph Lister had earlier practiced hand sanitizing in medical contexts in the 1860s.

== Controversies ==
A French national hero at age 55, in 1878 Pasteur discreetly told his family to never reveal his laboratory notebooks to anyone. His family obeyed, and all his documents were held and inherited in secrecy. Being that Pasteur did not allow others in his laboratory to keep notebooks, this secrecy kept many aspects of Pasteur's research unknown until relatively recently. Finally, in 1964 Pasteur's grandson and last surviving male descendant, Pasteur Vallery-Radot, donated the papers to the French national library. Yet the papers were restricted for historical studies until the death of Vallery-Radot in 1971. The documents were given a catalogue number only in 1985.

In 1995, the centennial of the death of Louis Pasteur, a historian of science Gerald L. Geison published an analysis of Pasteur's private notebooks in his The Private Science of Louis Pasteur, and declared that Pasteur had given several misleading accounts and played deceptions in his most important discoveries. Max Perutz published a defense of Pasteur in The New York Review of Books. Based on further examinations of Pasteur's documents, French immunologist Patrice Debré concluded in his book Louis Pasteur (1998) that, in spite of his genius, Pasteur had some faults. A book review states that Debré "sometimes finds him unfair, combative, arrogant, unattractive in attitude, inflexible and even dogmatic".

=== Fermentation ===
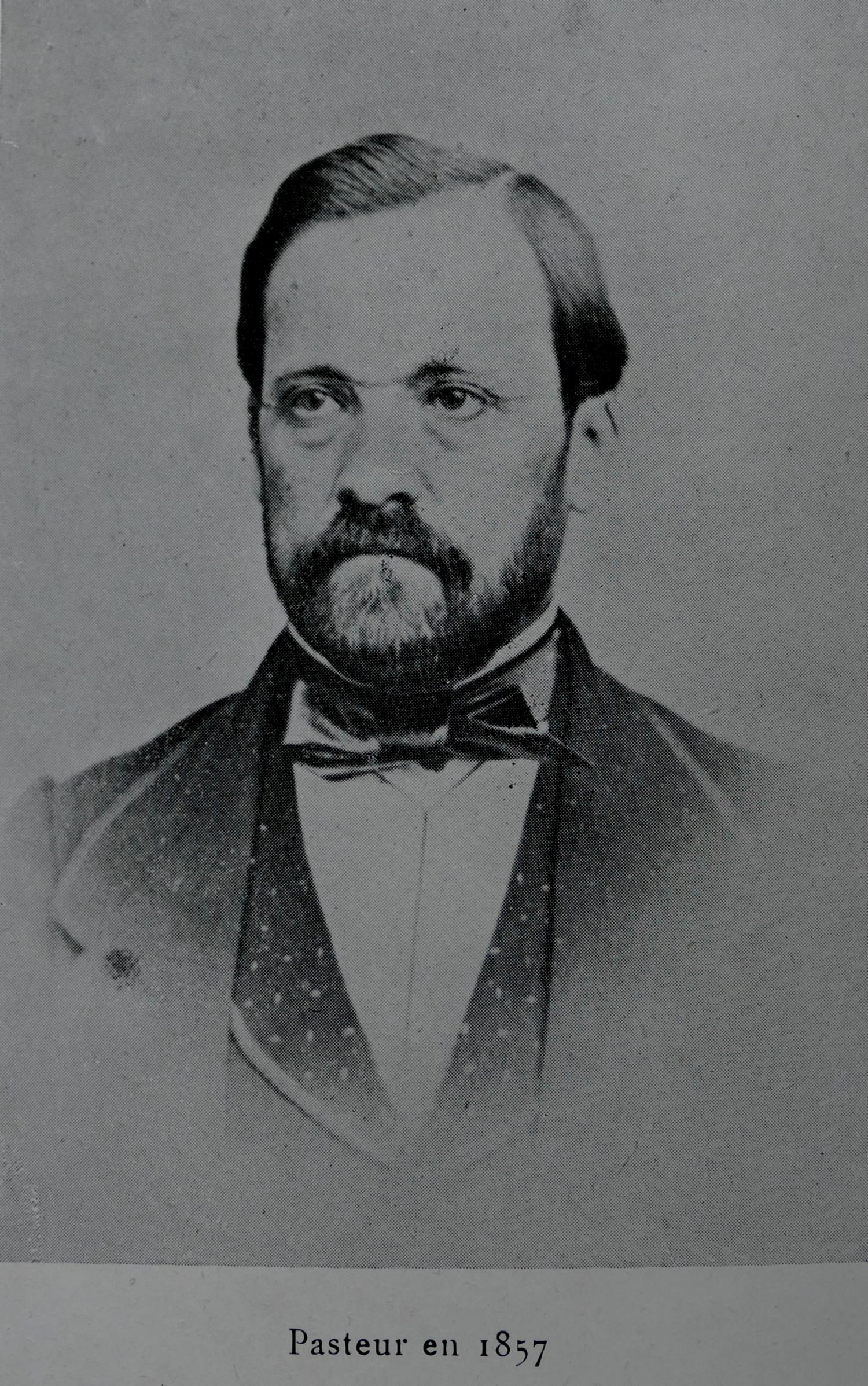
Pasteur in 1857

Scientists before Pasteur had studied fermentation. In the 1830s, Charles Cagniard-Latour, Friedrich Traugott Kützing and Theodor Schwann used microscopes to study yeasts and concluded that yeasts were living organisms. In 1839, Justus von Liebig, Friedrich Wöhler and Jöns Jacob Berzelius stated that yeast was not an organism and was produced when air acted on plant juice.

In 1855, Antoine Béchamp, Professor of Chemistry at the University of Montpellier, conducted experiments with sucrose solutions and concluded that water was the factor for fermentation. He changed his conclusion in 1858, stating that fermentation was directly related to the growth of moulds, which required air for growth. He regarded himself as the first to show the role of microorganisms in fermentation.

Pasteur started his experiments in 1857 and published his findings in 1858 (April issue of Comptes Rendus Chimie, Béchamp's paper appeared in January issue). Béchamp noted that Pasteur did not bring any novel idea or experiments. On the other hand, Béchamp was probably aware of Pasteur's 1857 preliminary works. With both scientists claiming priority on the discovery, a dispute, extending to several areas, lasted throughout their lives.

However, Béchamp was on the losing side, as the BMJ obituary remarked: His name was "associated with bygone controversies as to priority which it would be unprofitable to recall". Béchamp proposed the incorrect theory of microzymes. According to K. L. Manchester, anti-vivisectionists and proponents of alternative medicine promoted Béchamp and microzymes, unjustifiably claiming that Pasteur plagiarized Béchamp.

Pasteur thought that succinic acid inverted sucrose. In 1860, Marcellin Berthelot isolated invertase and showed that succinic acid did not invert sucrose. Pasteur believed that fermentation was only due to living cells. He and Berthelot engaged in a long argument subject of vitalism, in which Berthelot was vehemently opposed to any idea of vitalism. Hans Buchner discovered that zymase (not an enzyme, but a mixture of enzymes) catalyzed fermentation, showing that fermentation was catalyzed by enzymes within cells. Eduard Buchner also discovered that fermentation could take place outside living cells.

=== Anthrax vaccine ===
Pasteur publicly claimed his success in developing the anthrax vaccine in 1881. However, his admirer-turned-rival Henry Toussaint was the one who developed the first vaccine. Toussaint isolated the bacteria that caused chicken cholera (later named Pasteurella in honour of Pasteur) in 1879 and gave samples to Pasteur who used them for his own works. On 12 July 1880, Toussaint presented his successful result to the French Academy of Sciences, using an attenuated vaccine against anthrax in dogs and sheep. Pasteur on grounds of jealousy contested the discovery by publicly displaying his vaccination method at Pouilly-le-Fort on 5 May 1881. Pasteur then gave a misleading account of the preparation of the anthrax vaccine used in the experiment. He claimed that he made a "live vaccine", but used potassium dichromate to inactivate anthrax spores, a method similar to Toussaint's. The promotional experiment was a success and helped Pasteur sell his products, getting the benefits and glory.

=== Experimental ethics ===
Pasteur's experiments are often cited as against medical ethics, especially on his vaccination of Meister. He did not have any experience in medical practice, and more importantly, lacked a medical license. This is often cited as a serious threat to his professional and personal reputation. His closest partner Émile Roux, who had medical qualifications, refused to participate in the clinical trial, likely because he considered it unjust. However, Pasteur executed vaccination of the boy under the close watch of practising physicians Jacques-Joseph Grancher, head of the Paris Children's Hospital's paediatric clinic, and Alfred Vulpian, a member of the Commission on Rabies. He was not allowed to hold the syringe, although the inoculations were entirely under his supervision. It was Grancher who was responsible for the injections, and he defended Pasteur before the French National Academy of Medicine in the issue.

Pasteur has also been criticized for keeping secrecy of his procedure and not giving proper pre-clinical trials on animals. Pasteur stated that he kept his procedure secret in order to control its quality. He later disclosed his procedures to a small group of scientists. Pasteur wrote that he had successfully vaccinated 50 rabid dogs before using it on Meister. According to Geison, Pasteur's laboratory notebooks show that he had vaccinated only 11 dogs.

== Awards and honours ==
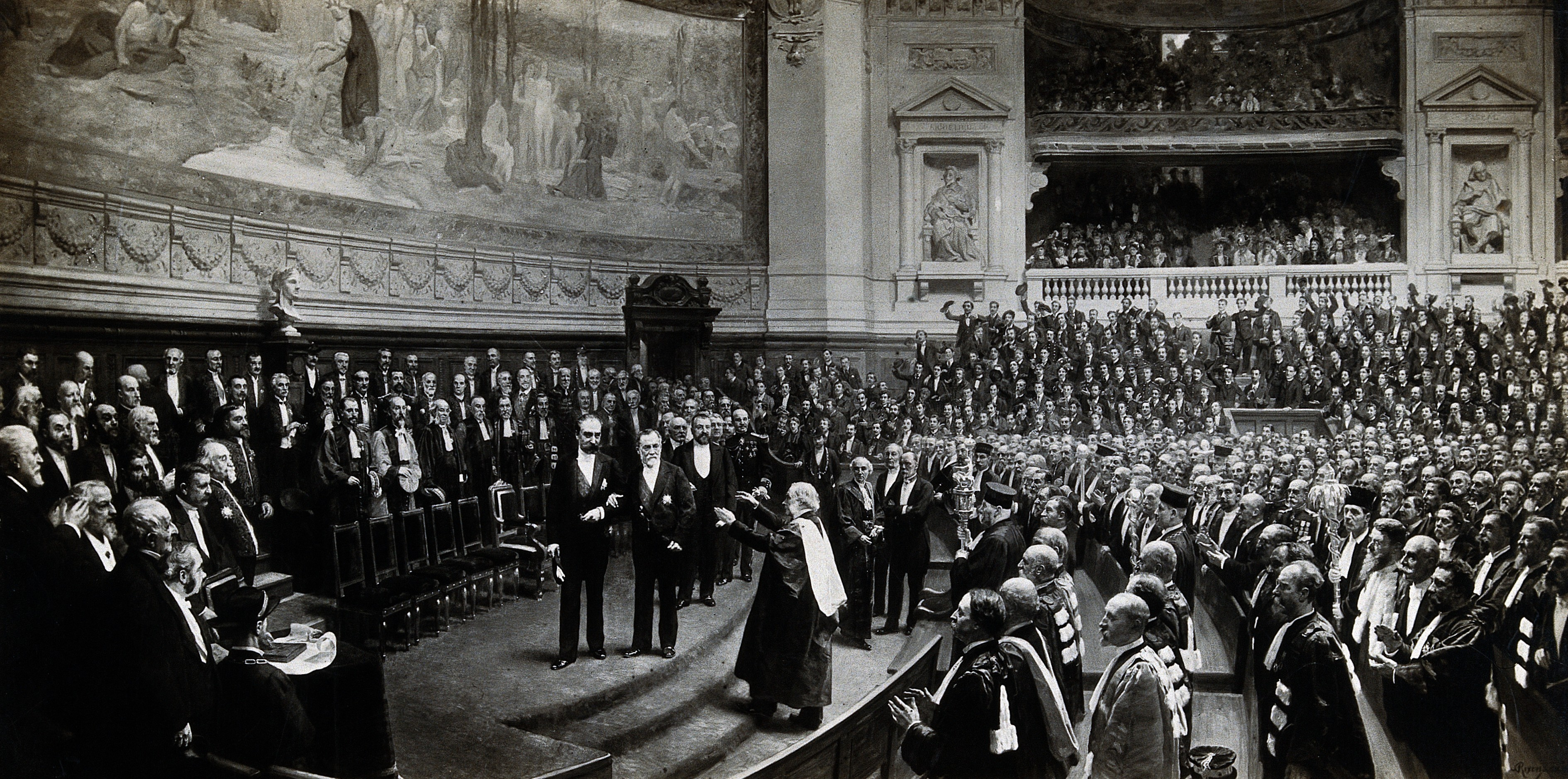
Joseph Lister acclaiming Louis Pasteur at Pasteur's Jubilee at the Sorbonne, Paris, 27 December 1892

Pasteur was awarded 1,500 francs in 1853 by the Pharmaceutical Society for the synthesis of racemic acid. In 1856 the Royal Society of London presented him the Rumford Medal for his discovery of the nature of racemic acid and its relations to polarized light, and the Copley Medal in 1874 for his work on fermentation. He was elected a Foreign Member of the Royal Society (ForMemRS) in 1869.

The French Academy of Sciences awarded Pasteur the 1859 Montyon Prize for experimental physiology in 1860, and the Jecker Prize in 1861 and the Alhumbert Prize in 1862 for his experimental refutation of spontaneous generation. Though he lost elections in 1857 and 1861 for membership to the French Academy of Sciences, he won the 1862 election for membership to the mineralogy section. He was elected to permanent secretary of the physical science section of the academy in 1887 and held the position until 1889. During this time he was elected to honorary membership of the Manchester Literary and Philosophical Society, in 1866.

In 1873, Pasteur was elected to the Académie Nationale de Médecine and was made the commander in the Brazilian Order of the Rose. In 1881 he was elected to a seat at the Académie française left vacant by Émile Littré. Pasteur received the Albert Medal from the Royal Society of Arts in 1882. In 1883 he became foreign member of the Royal Netherlands Academy of Arts and Sciences. In 1885, he was elected as a member to the American Philosophical Society. On 8 June 1886, the Ottoman Sultan Abdul Hamid II awarded Pasteur with the Order of the Medjidie (I Class) and 10000 Ottoman liras. He was awarded the Cameron Prize for Therapeutics of the University of Edinburgh in 1889. Pasteur won the Leeuwenhoek Medal from the Royal Netherlands Academy of Arts and Sciences for his contributions to microbiology in 1895.

Pasteur was made a Chevalier of the Legion of Honour in 1853, promoted to Officer in 1863, to Commander in 1868, to Grand Officer in 1878 and made a Grand Cross of the Legion of Honor in 1881.

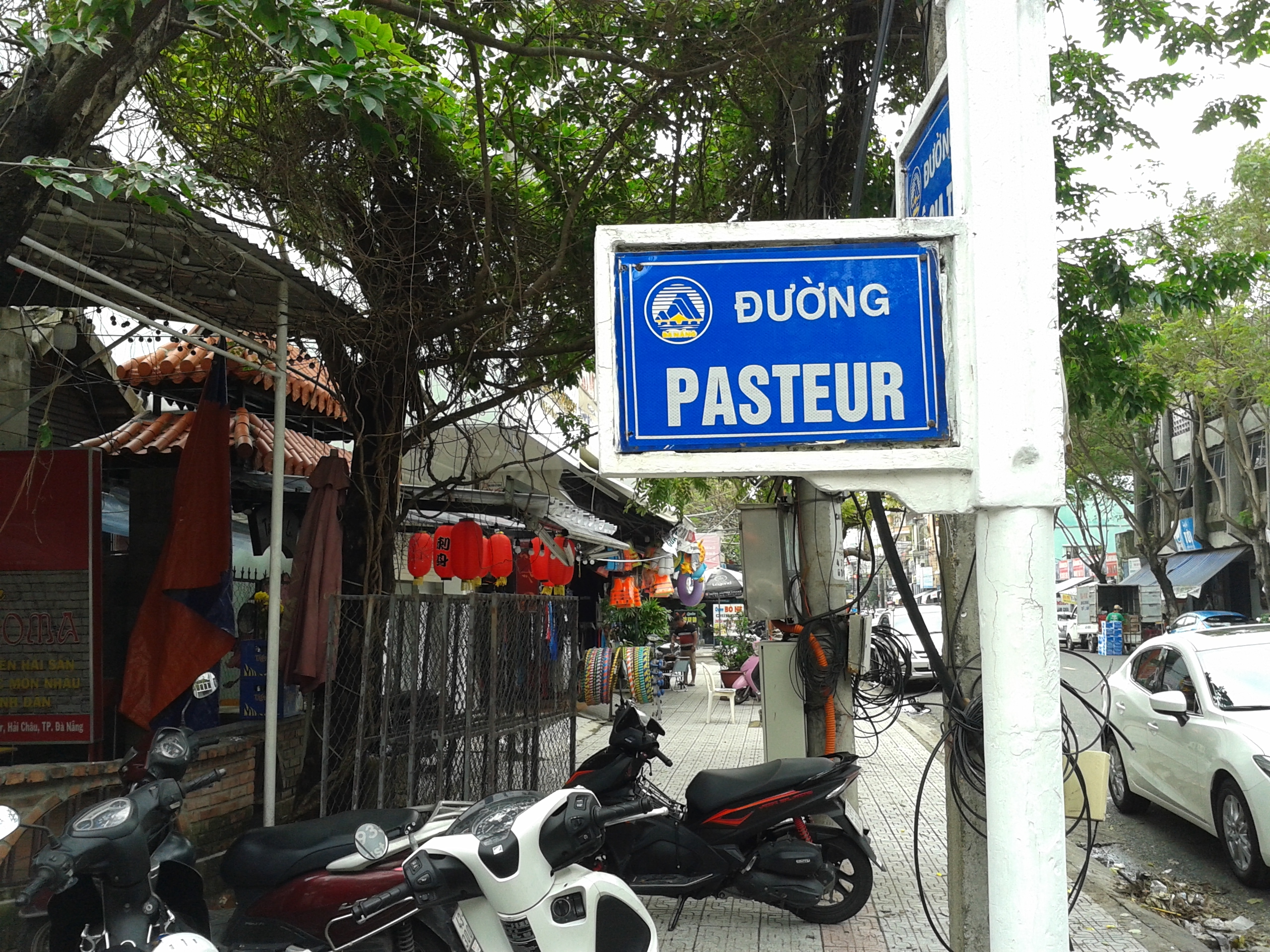
Pasteur Street (Đường Pasteur) in Da Nang, Vietnam

=== Legacy ===
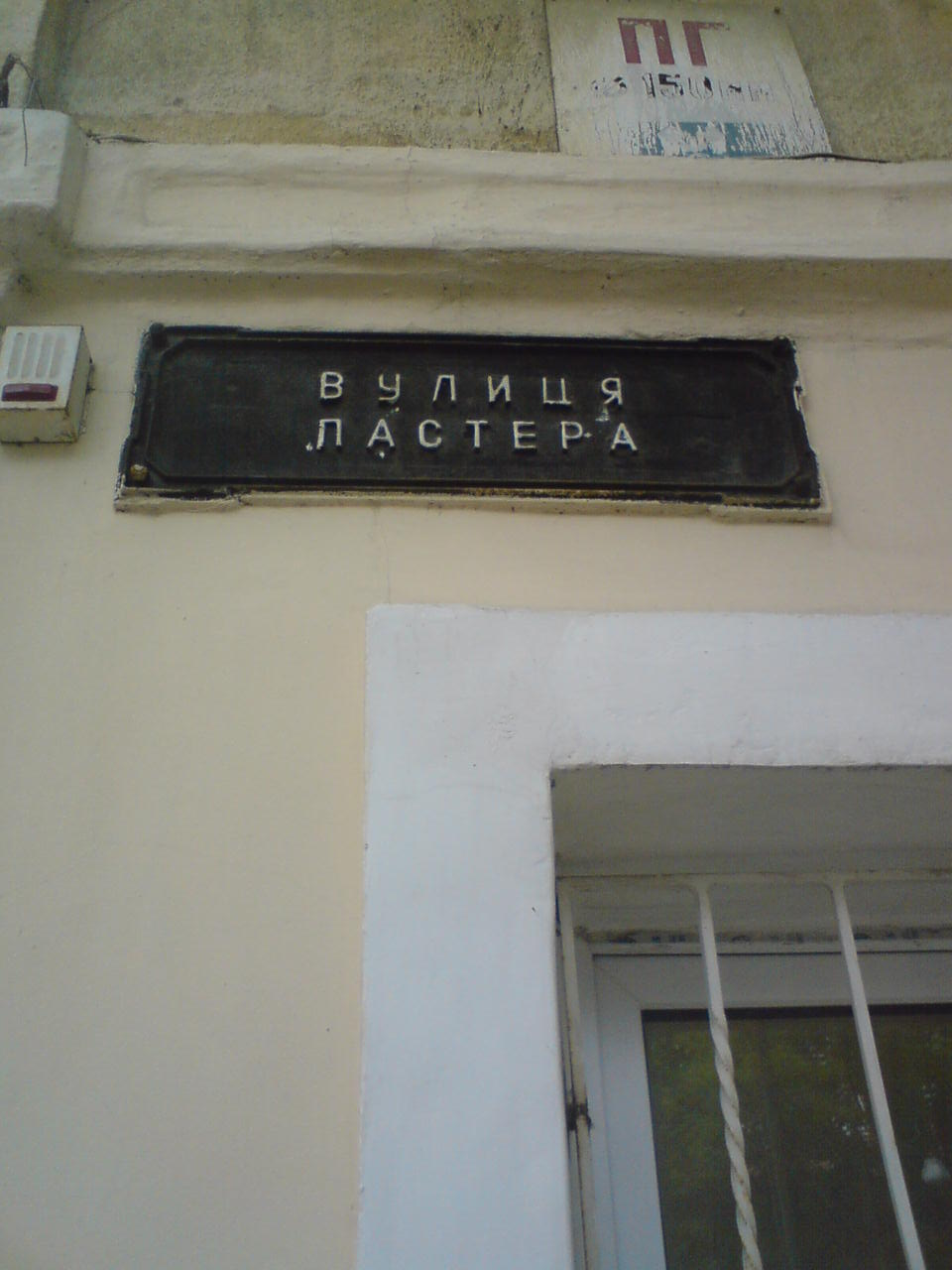
Vulitsya Pastera or Pasteur Street in Odesa, Ukraine

In many localities worldwide, streets are named in his honor. For example, in the US: Palo Alto and Irvine, California, Boston and Polk, Florida, adjacent to the University of Texas Health Science Center at San Antonio; Jonquière, Québec; San Salvador de Jujuy and Buenos Aires (Argentina), Great Yarmouth in Norfolk, in the United Kingdom, Jericho and Wulguru in Queensland, Australia; Phnom Penh in Cambodia; Ho Chi Minh City and Da Nang, Vietnam; Batna in Algeria; Bandung in Indonesia, Tehran in Iran, near the central campus of the Warsaw University in Warsaw, Poland; adjacent to the Odesa State Medical University in Odesa, Ukraine; Milan in Italy and Bucharest, Cluj-Napoca and Timișoara in Romania. The Avenue Pasteur in Saigon, Vietnam, is one of the few streets in that city to retain its French name. Avenue Louis Pasteur in the Longwood Medical and Academic Area in Boston was named in his honor in the French manner with "Avenue" preceding the name of the dedicatee.

Both the Institut Pasteur and Université Louis Pasteur were named after Pasteur. The schools Lycée Pasteur in Neuilly-sur-Seine, France, and Lycée Louis Pasteur in Calgary, Alberta, Canada, are named after him. In South Africa, the Louis Pasteur Private Hospital in Pretoria, and Life Louis Pasteur Private Hospital, Bloemfontein, are named after him. Louis Pasteur University Hospital in Košice, Slovakia is also named after Pasteur.

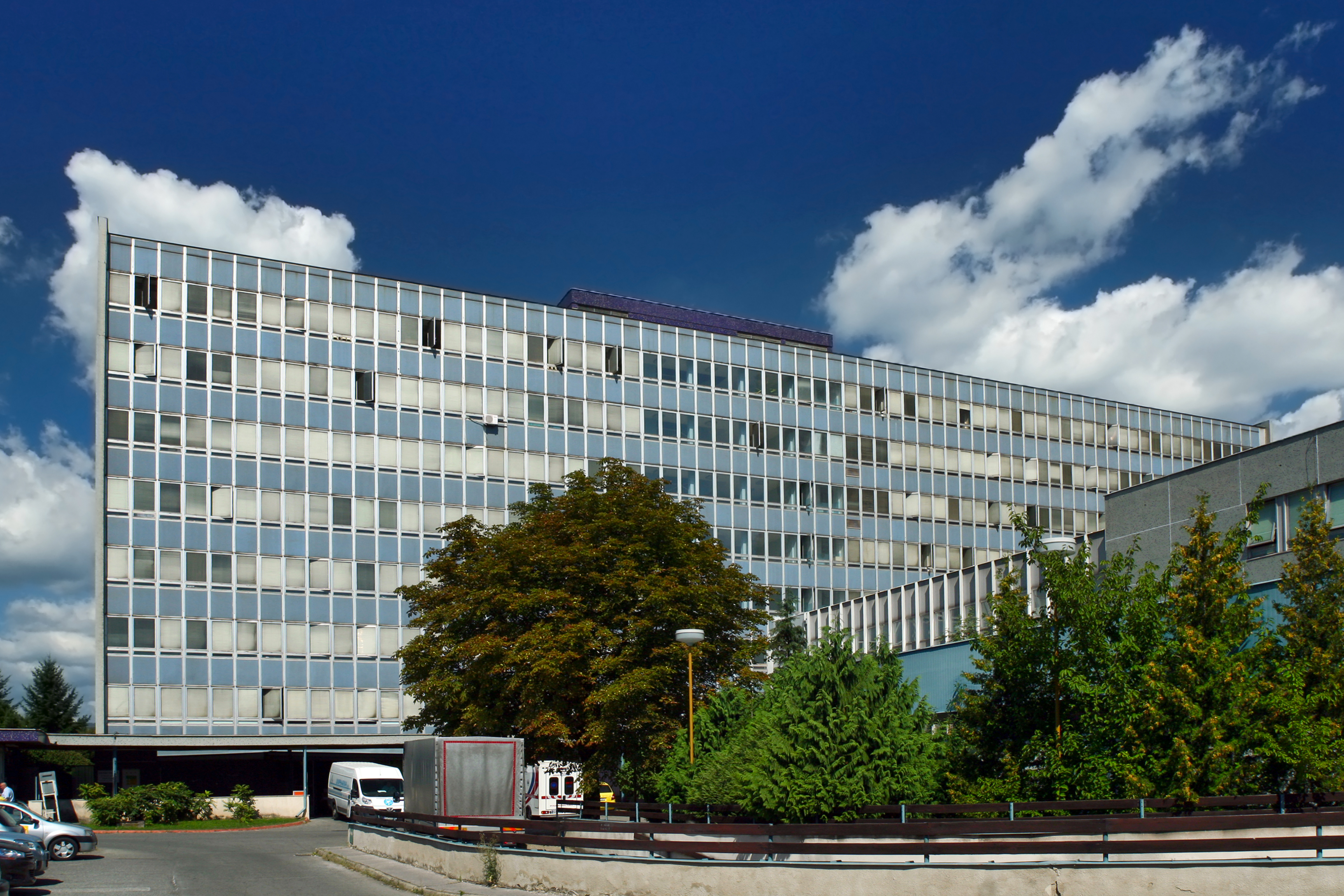
Louis Pasteur University Hospital, Košice, Slovakia

A statue of Pasteur is erected at San Rafael High School in San Rafael, California. A bronze bust of him resides on the French Campus of Kaiser Permanente's San Francisco Medical Center in San Francisco. The sculpture was designed by Harriet G. Moore and cast in 1984 by Artworks Foundry.

The UNESCO/Institut Pasteur Medal was created on the centenary of Pasteur's death, and is given every two years in his name, "in recognition of outstanding research contributing to a beneficial impact on human health".

The French Academician Henri Mondor stated: "Louis Pasteur was neither a physician nor a surgeon, but no one has done as much for medicine and surgery as he has."

=== Pasteur Institute ===
After developing the rabies vaccine, Pasteur proposed an institute for the vaccine. In 1887, fundraising for the Pasteur Institute began, with donations from many countries. The official statute was registered in 1887, stating that the institute's purposes were "the treatment of rabies according to the method developed by M. Pasteur" and "the study of virulent and contagious diseases". The institute was inaugurated on 14 November 1888. He brought together scientists with various specialties. The first five departments were directed by two graduates of the École Normale Supérieure: Émile Duclaux (general microbiology research) and Charles Chamberland (microbe research applied to hygiene), as well as a biologist, Élie Metchnikoff (morphological microbe research) and two physicians, Jacques-Joseph Grancher (rabies) and Émile Roux (technical microbe research). One year after the inauguration of the institute, Roux set up the first course of microbiology ever taught in the world, then entitled Cours de Microbie Technique (Course of microbe research techniques). Since 1891 the Pasteur Institute had been extended to different countries, and currently there are 32 institutes in 29 countries in various parts of the world.

== Personal life ==
Pasteur married Marie Pasteur (née Laurent) in 1849. She was the daughter of the rector of the University of Strasbourg, and was Pasteur's scientific assistant. They had five children together, three of whom died as children. Their eldest daughter, Jeanne, was born in 1850. She died from typhoid fever, aged 9, whilst at the boarding school Arbois in 1859. In 1865, 2-year-old Camille died of a liver tumour. Shortly after they decided to bring Cécile home from boarding school, but she too died of typhoid fever on 23 May 1866 at the age of 12. Only Jean Baptiste (b. 1851) and Marie Louise (b. 1858) survived to adulthood. Jean Baptiste would be a soldier in the Franco-Prussian War between France and Prussia.

Portrait of Marie-Louise Pasteur at 18 by Jean-Jacques Henner

=== Faith and spirituality ===
His grandson, Louis Pasteur Vallery-Radot, wrote that Pasteur had kept from his Catholic background only a spiritualism without religious practice. However, Catholic observers often said that Pasteur remained an ardent Christian throughout his whole life, and his son-in-law wrote, in a biography of him:

Absolute faith in God and in Eternity, and a conviction that the power for good given to us in this world will be continued beyond it, were feelings which pervaded his whole life; the virtues of the gospel had ever been present to him. Full of respect for the form of religion which had been that of his forefathers, he came simply to it and naturally for spiritual help in these last weeks of his life.

The Literary Digest of 18 October 1902 gives this statement from Pasteur that he prayed while he worked:

Posterity will one day laugh at the foolishness of modern materialistic philosophers. The more I study nature, the more I stand amazed at the work of the Creator. I pray while I am engaged at my work in the laboratory.

Maurice Vallery-Radot, grandson of the brother of the son-in-law of Pasteur and outspoken Catholic, also holds that Pasteur fundamentally remained Catholic. According to both Pasteur Vallery-Radot and Maurice Vallery-Radot, the following well-known quotation attributed to Pasteur is apocryphal: "The more I know, the more nearly is my faith that of the Breton peasant. Could I but know all I would have the faith of a Breton peasant's wife". According to Maurice Vallery-Radot, the false quotation appeared for the first time shortly after the death of Pasteur. However, despite his belief in God, it has been said that his views were that of a freethinker rather than a Catholic, a spiritual more than a religious man. He was also against mixing science with religion.

=== Death ===
In 1868, Pasteur suffered a severe stroke that paralysed the left side of his body, but he recovered. A stroke or uremia in 1894 severely impaired his health. Failing to fully recover, he died on 28 September 1895, near Paris. He was given a state funeral and was buried in the Cathedral of Notre Dame, but his remains were reinterred in the Pasteur Institute in Paris, in a vault covered in depictions of his accomplishments in Byzantine mosaics.

== Publications ==
Pasteur's principal published works are:

French Title	Year	English Title
Études sur le Vin	1866	Studies on Wine
Études sur le Vinaigre	1868	Studies on Vinegar
Études sur la Maladie des Vers à Soie (2 volumes)	1870	Studies on Silk Worm Disease
Quelques Réflexions sur la Science en France	1871	Some Reflections on Science in France
Études sur la Bière	1876	Studies on Beer
Les Microbes organisés, leur rôle dans la Fermentation, la Putréfaction et la Contagion	1878	Microbes organized, their role in fermentation, putrefaction and the Contagion
Discours de Réception de M.L. Pasteur à l'Académie française	1882	Speech by Mr L. Pasteur on reception to the Académie française
Traitement de la Rage	1886	Treatment of Rabies

== See also ==
- Infection control
- Infectious disease
- List of things named after Louis Pasteur
- Pasteur Institute
- Pasteurization
- The Story of Louis Pasteur—A 1936 biographical film
- Statue of Louis Pasteur, Mexico City
