= Fermentation theory =

Biochemistry concept

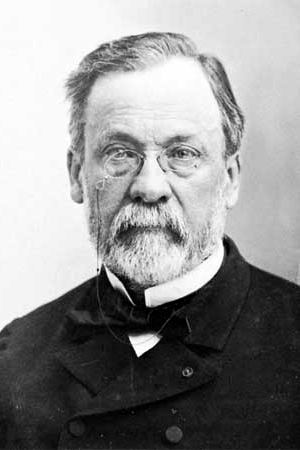
Louis Pasteur, Archives Photographiques

In biochemistry, fermentation theory refers to the historical study of models of natural fermentation processes, especially alcoholic and lactic acid fermentation. Notable contributors to the theory include Justus Von Liebig and Louis Pasteur, the latter of whom developed a purely microbial basis for the fermentation process based on his experiments. Pasteur's work on fermentation later led to his development of the germ theory of disease, which put the concept of spontaneous generation to rest. Although the fermentation process had been used extensively throughout history prior to the origin of Pasteur's prevailing theories, the underlying biological and chemical processes were not fully understood. In the contemporary, fermentation is used in the production of various alcoholic beverages, foodstuffs, and medications.

== Overview of fermentation ==
Process of Fermentation

Fermentation is the anaerobic metabolic process that converts sugar into acids, gases, or alcohols in oxygen starved environments. Yeast and many other microbes commonly use fermentation to carry out anaerobic respiration necessary for survival. Even the human body carries out fermentation processes from time to time, such as during long-distance running; lactic acid will build up in muscles over the course of long-term exertion. Within the human body, lactic acid is the by-product of ATP-producing fermentation, which produces energy so the body can continue to exercise in situations where oxygen intake cannot be processed fast enough. Although fermentation yields less ATP than aerobic respiration, it can occur at a much higher rate. Fermentation has been used by humans consciously since around 5000 BCE, evidenced by jars recovered in the Iran Zagros Mountains area containing remnants of microbes similar to those present in the wine-making process.

== History ==
Prior to Pasteur's research on fermentation, there existed some preliminary competing notions of it. One scientist who had a substantial degree of influence on the theory of fermentation was Justus von Liebig. Liebig believed that fermentation was largely a process of decomposition as a consequence of the exposure of yeast to air and water. This theory was corroborated by Liebig's observation that other decomposing matter, such as rotten plant and animal parts, interacted with sugar in a similar manner as yeast. That is, the decomposition of albuminous matter (i.e. water-soluble proteins) caused sugar to transform to alcohol. Liebig held this view until his death in 1873. A different theory was supported by Charles Cagniard de la Tour and cell theorist Theodor Schwann, who claimed that alcoholic fermentation depended on the biological processes carried out by brewer's yeast.

Louis Pasteur's interest in fermentation began when he noticed some remarkable properties of amyl alcohol—a by-product of lactic acid and alcohol fermentation—during his biochemical studies. In particular, Pasteur noted its ability to “rotate the plane of polarized light”, and its “unsymmetric arrangement of atoms." These behaviors were characteristic of organic compounds Pasteur had previously examined, but also presented a hurdle to his own research about a "law of hemihedral correlation". Pasteur had previously been attempting to derive connections between substances' chemical structures and external shape, and the optically active amyl alcohol did not follow his expectations according to the proposed 'law'. Pasteur sought a reason for why there happened to be this exception, and why such a chemical compound was generated during the fermentation process in the first place. In a series of lectures later in 1860, Pasteur attempted to link optical activity and molecular asymmetry to organic origins of substances, asserting that no chemical processes were capable of converting symmetric substances (inorganic) into asymmetric ones (organic). Hence, the amyl alcohol observation provided some of the first motivations for a biological explanation of fermentation.

In 1856, Pasteur was able to observe the microbes responsible for alcoholic fermentation under a microscope, as a professor of science in the University of Lille. According to a legend originating in the 1900 biography of Pasteur, one of his chemistry students—an owner of a beetroot alcohol factory in Lille—sought aid from him after an unsuccessful year of brewing. Pasteur performed experiments at the factory in observation of the fermentation process, noticing that yeast globules became elongated after lactic acid was formed, but round and full when alcohol was fermenting correctly.

In a different observation, Pasteur inspected particles originating on grapevines under the microscope and revealed the presence of living cells. Leaving these cells immersed in grape juice resulted in active alcoholic fermentation. This observation provided evidence for ending the distinction between ‘artificial’ fermentation in wine and ‘true’ fermentation in yeast products. The previous incorrect distinction had stemmed in part from the fact that yeast had to be added to beer wort in order to provoke desired alcoholic fermentation, while the fermenting catalysts for wine occurred naturally on grapevines; the fermentation of wine had been viewed as 'artificial' since it did not require additional catalyst, but the natural catalyst had been present on the grapevine itself. These observations provided Pasteur with a working hypothesis for future experiments.

One of the chemical processes that Pasteur studied was the fermentation of sugar into lactic acid, as occurs in the souring of milk. In an 1857 experiment, Pasteur was able to isolate microorganisms present in lactic acid ferment after the chemical process had taken place. Pasteur then cultivated the microorganisms in a culture with his laboratory. He was then able to accelerate the lactic acid fermentation process in fresh milk by administering the cultivated sample to it. This was an important step in proving his hypothesis that lactic acid fermentation was catalyzed by microorganisms.

Pasteur also experimented with the mechanisms of brewer's yeast in the absence of organic nitrogen. By adding pure brewer's yeast to a solution of cane sugar, ammonium salt, and yeast ash, Pasteur was able to observe the alcoholic fermentation process with all of its usual byproducts: glycerin, succinic acid, and small amounts of cellulose and fatty matters. However, if any of the ingredients were removed from the solution, no fermentation would occur. To Pasteur, this was proof that yeast required the nitrogen, minerals, and carbon from the medium for its metabolic processes, releasing carbonic acid and ethyl alcohol as byproducts. This also disproved Liebig's theory, since there was no albuminous matter present in the medium; the decomposition of the yeast was not the driving force for the observed fermentation.

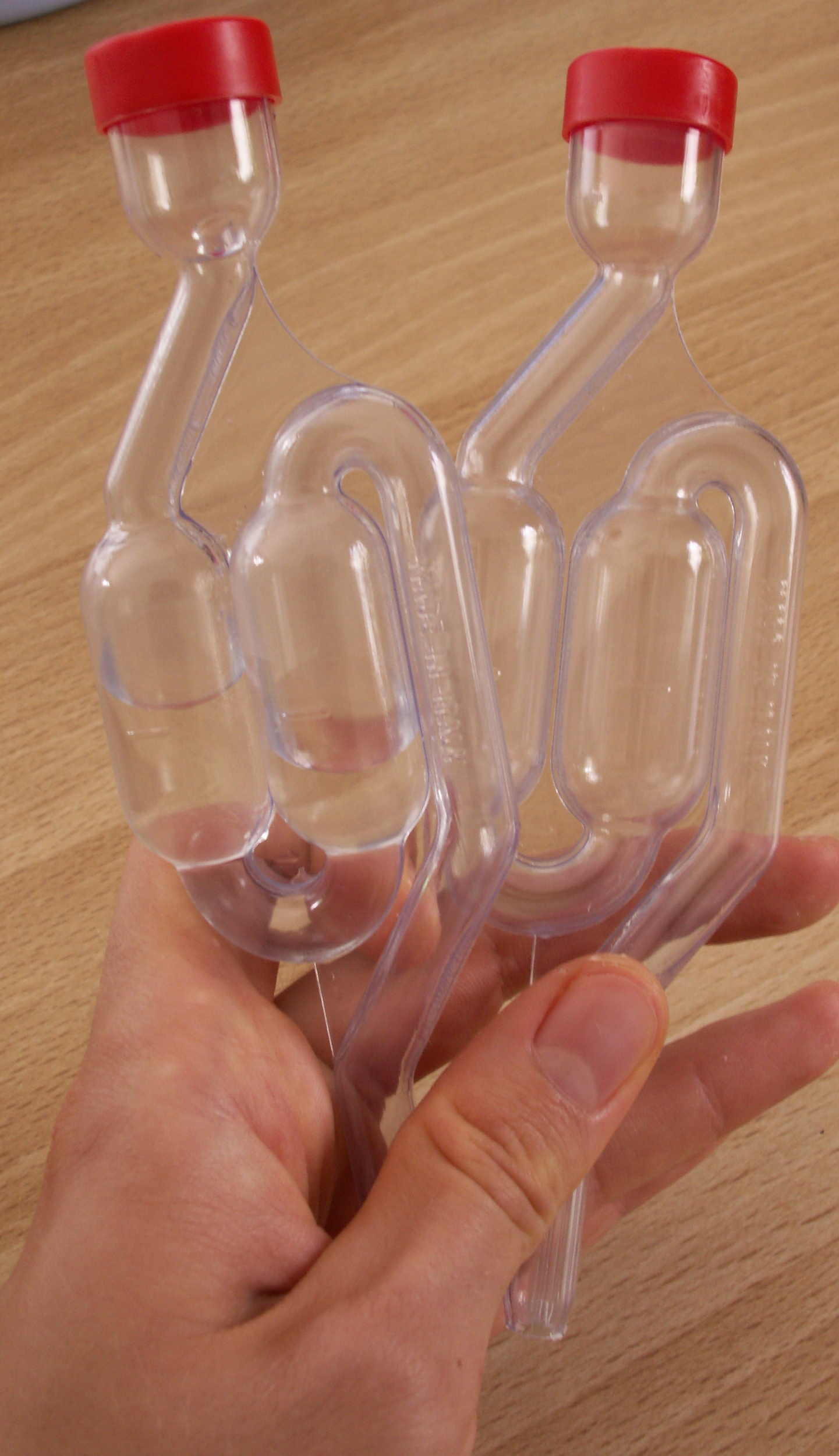
A fermentation lock, an example of a curved neck apparatus used in brewing today

== Pasteur on spontaneous generation ==
Before the 1860s and 1870s—when Pasteur published his work on this theory—it was believed that microorganisms and even some small animals such as frogs would spontaneously generate. Spontaneous generation was historically explained in a variety of ways. Aristotle, an ancient Greek philosopher, theorized that creatures appeared out of certain concoctions of earthly elements, such as clay or mud mixing with water and sunlight. Later on, Felix Pouchet argued for the existence of 'plastic forces' within plant and animal debris capable of spontaneously generating eggs, and new organisms were born from these eggs. On top of this, a common piece of evidence that seemed to corroborate the theory was the appearance of maggots on raw meat after it was left exposed to open air.

In the 1860s and 1870s, Pasteur's interest in spontaneous generation led him to criticize Pouchet's theories and conduct experiments of his own. In his first experiment, he took boiled sugared yeast-water and sealed it in an airtight contraption. Feeding hot, sterile air into the mixture left it unaltered, while introducing atmospheric dust resulted in microbes and mold appearing within the mixture. This result was also strengthened by the fact that Pasteur used asbestos, a form of totally inorganic matter, to carry the atmospheric dust. In a second experiment, Pasteur used the same flasks and sugar-yeast mixture, but left it idle in 'swan-neck' flasks instead of introducing any extraneous matter. Some flasks were kept open to the common air as the control group, and these exhibited mold and microbial growths within a day or two. When the swan-neck flasks failed to show these same microbial growths, Pasteur concluded that the structure of the necks blocked the passage of atmospheric dust into the solution. From the two experiments, Pasteur concluded that the atmospheric dust carried germs responsible for the 'spontaneous generation' in his broths. Thus, Pasteur's work provided proof that the emergent growth of bacteria in nutrient broths is caused by biogenesis rather than some form of spontaneous generation.

== Applications ==
Today, the process of fermentation is used for a multitude of everyday applications including medication, beverages and food. Currently, companies like Genencor International uses the production of enzymes involved in fermentation to build a revenue of over $400 million a year. Many medications such as antibiotics are produced by the fermentation process. An example is the important drug cortisone, which can be prepared by the fermentation of a plant steroid known as diosgenin.

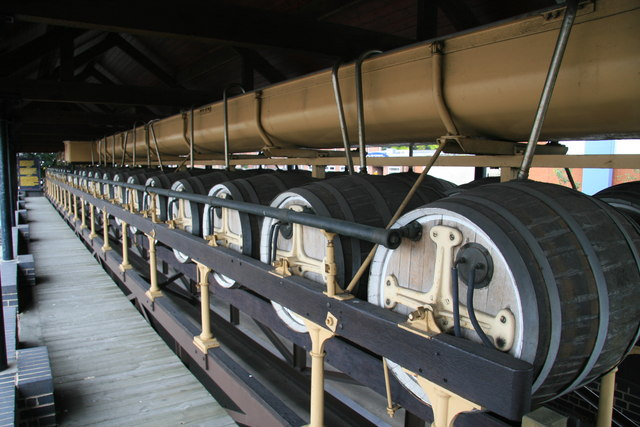
Burton Union fermentation system, Coors Visitor Centre

The enzymes used in the reaction are provided by the mold Rhizopus nigricans. Just as it is commonly known, alcohol of all types and brands are also produced by way of fermentation and distillation. Moonshine is a classic example of how this is carried out. Finally, foods such as yogurt are made by fermentation processes as well. Yogurt is a fermented milk product that contains the characteristic bacterial cultures Lactobacillus bulgaricus and Streptococcus thermopiles.

== See also ==
- Cellular respiration
- Distillation
- Fermentation in food processing
- Louis Pasteur
- Spontaneous generation
- Zymotic diseases (for the Greek language term zumoun for "ferment")
