= Mitscherlich =

Mitscherlich is a Germanic surname which may refer to:

- Alexander Mitscherlich (chemist) (1836–1918), German chemist
- Alexander Mitscherlich (psychologist) (1908–1982), German psychiatrist
- Andrea Ehrig-Mitscherlich (born 1 December 1960), former German speed skater
- Christoph Wilhelm Mitscherlich (1760–1854), German classical scholar
- Eilhard Mitscherlich (1794–1863), German chemist
- Immeke Mitscherlich (1899–1985), German textile artist
- Margarete Mitscherlich-Nielsen (1917–2012), psychoanalyst
- Thomas Mitscherlich (1942–1998), German film director and screenwriter
