= Zymotic disease =

Medical term for acute infectious diseases

Diagram of the causes of mortality in the army in the East, F. Nightingale, 1858

Zymotic disease was a 19th-century medical term for acute infectious diseases, especially "chief fevers and contagious diseases (e.g. typhus and typhoid fevers, smallpox, scarlet fever, measles, erysipelas, cholera, whooping-cough, diphtheria, etc.)".

Zyme or microzyme was the name of the organism presumed to be the cause of the disease.

As originally employed by William Farr, of the British Registrar-General's department, the term included the diseases which were "epidemic, endemic and contagious," and were regarded as owing their origin to the presence of a morbific principle in the system, acting in a manner analogous to, although not identical with, the process of fermentation.

In the late 19th century, Antoine Béchamp proposed that tiny organisms he termed microzymas, and not cells, are the fundamental building block of life. Béchamp claimed these microzymas are present in all things—animal, vegetable, and mineral—whether living or dead. Microzymas coalesce to form blood clots and bacteria. Depending upon the condition of the host, microzymas assume various forms. In a diseased body, the microzymas become pathological bacteria and viruses. In a healthy body, microzymas form healthy cells. When a plant or animal dies, the microzymas live on. His ideas did not gain acceptance.

The word zymotic comes from the Greek word ζυμοῦν zumoûn which means "to ferment". It was in British official use from 1839. This term was used extensively in the English Bills of Mortality as a cause of death from 1842. In 1877, Thomas Watson wrote in a Scientific American article "Zymotic Disease" describing contagion as the origin of infectious diseases.

Robert Newstead (1859–1947) used this term in a 1907 publication in the Annals of Tropical Medicine and Parasitology, to describe the contribution of house flies (Musca domestica) towards the spread of infectious diseases. However, by the early 1900s, bacteriology "displaced the old fermentation theory", and so the term became obsolete.

In her Diagram of the causes of mortality in the army in the East, Florence Nightingale depicts

The blue wedges measured from the centre of the circle represent area for area the deaths from Preventible or Mitigable Zymotic diseases; the red wedges measured from the centre the deaths from wounds, & the black wedges measured from the centre the deaths from all other causes.

== Zymotic theory ==
Zymotic diseases were named so in the context of an obsolete theory, called the zymotic theory of disease. It states that:

1. Diseases are caused by the decomposition of tissues (skin, blood, etc), like fermentation and putrefaction.
2. They are all purely chemical processes and does not involve biological organisms, such as the hypothesized "germs" in germ theory.
3. There is no different types of decomposition, but a general type. That is, pathogens are not specific, unlike in germ theory where each germ is the specific pathogen of a specific disease.
4. Different diseases are due to different types and locations for tissue decomposition.
5. A healthy tissue that contacts a decomposing tissue, either by direct contact or indirect contact (such as by bad air), can somehow be influenced by it and start decomposing.
6. A healthy tissue can also spontaneously start decomposing, under the correct conditions (such as hot and humid days).

For example, many diseases begin by the decomposition of blood, and the decomposing blood then influences organs in the body, which then start decomposing.
