= Fowl cholera =

Bacterial disease of birds

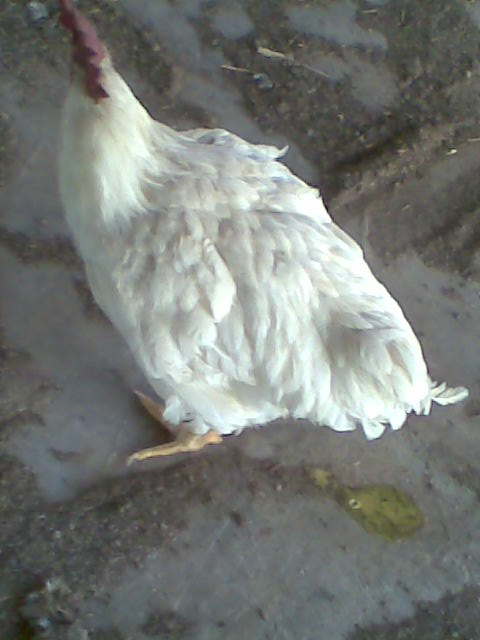
Cock of a breeding flock with green diarrhea

Fowl cholera is also called avian cholera, avian pasteurellosis and avian hemorrhagic septicemia.

It is the most common pasteurellosis of poultry. As the causative agent is Pasteurella multocida, it is considered to be a zoonosis.

Adult birds and old chickens are more susceptible. In parental flocks, cocks are far more susceptible than hens.

Besides chickens, the disease also concerns turkeys, ducks, geese, raptors, and canaries. Turkeys are particularly sensitive, with mortality ranging to 65%.

The recognition of this pathological condition is of ever increasing importance for differential diagnosis with avian influenza.

== History ==
The disease was first recorded in the 18th century. In 1879, Pasteur received a bacterial sample from Jean Joseph Henri Toussaint DVM, Professor, Toulouse Veterinary College who had been working with Fowl Cholera. Louis Pasteur then isolated and grew it in pure culture. Originally a disease of fowl in Europe, it was first recorded in North America in 1943–44. Since then outbreaks have been recorded almost annually in wild birds. Today, this disease is most prevalent in wild waterfowl of North America.

In December 1880, Pasteur announced to the French Academy of Sciences that he was working on a vaccine against fowl cholera. In fact, Pasteur's vaccine had irregular effects and was a failure.

In 2011 an outbreak of avian cholera killed thousands of eider ducks in Arctic regions of Canada. Scientists are studying the outbreak and its potential to spread to Greenland.

In March 2015, another outbreak of avian cholera killed roughly 2,000 snow geese in northern Idaho while flying their spring migration to Canada.

== Epidemiology ==
Outbreaks occur in cold and wet weather (in late summer, fall and winter). The outbreaks are often traced back to the presence of rodents in the breeding houses. These are thought to spread the disease from carcasses of dead birds (possibly from neighboring backyards), improperly disposed of. Once the disease is introduced to a flock, it will stay until culling. Chronic carriers can always lead to re-emerging of the disease in susceptible birds.

In wild birds, this disease is most commonly associated with wetlands. Blanchong et al. determined that wetlands act as short term reservoirs, recording large amounts of the bacterium in the soil and water through the duration of the outbreak. Wetlands, however, are not long term reservoirs.

The disease presents in two very different forms: acute and chronic. Birds with chronic avian cholera, more common in domestic fowl, exhibit prolonged illness with more localized infections. Chronic infection has been demonstrated in snow geese, and these individuals are believed to be long term migrating reservoirs for the disease.

Once the bacteria gets introduced into a population of susceptible birds, an outbreak of acute avian cholera follows. Infected birds will die 6–12 hours after contracting the bacterium, and very few ill birds have been described. Due to association and dense aggregations, waterfowl are most commonly affected by P. multocida, however scavengers and other water birds are often affected in large multi-species outbreaks.

== Clinical signs and post-mortem lesions ==
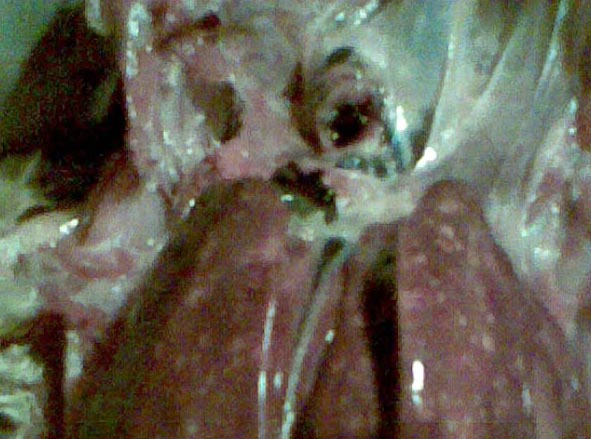
Necrotic foci on liver

In acute cases, a green diarrhea can be an early symptom.

The most typical symptom, in chronic cases, is the swelling of the wattles. It is more frequent in resistant local breeds. Rather than a general infection, localized infections are more characteristic. These often occur in the respiratory tract including the sinuses and pneumatics bones, hock joints, sternal bursa, foot pads, peritoneal cavity and oviducts.

In acute cases, the most typical post-mortem lesion is the petechiae observed in the epicardial fatty tissue. Necrotic foci on liver are usually found and general hyperemia is common. Due to the speed of infection and mortality, birds are in good body condition and do not exhibit the signs of prolonged illness.

== Treatment ==
The most efficient treatment in breeding flocks or laying hens is individual intramuscular injections of a long-acting tetracycline, with the same antibiotic in drinking water, simultaneously. The mortality and clinical signs will stop within one week, but the bacteria might remain present in the flock.
