= Sydenham Society =

Medical society in London, United Kingdom

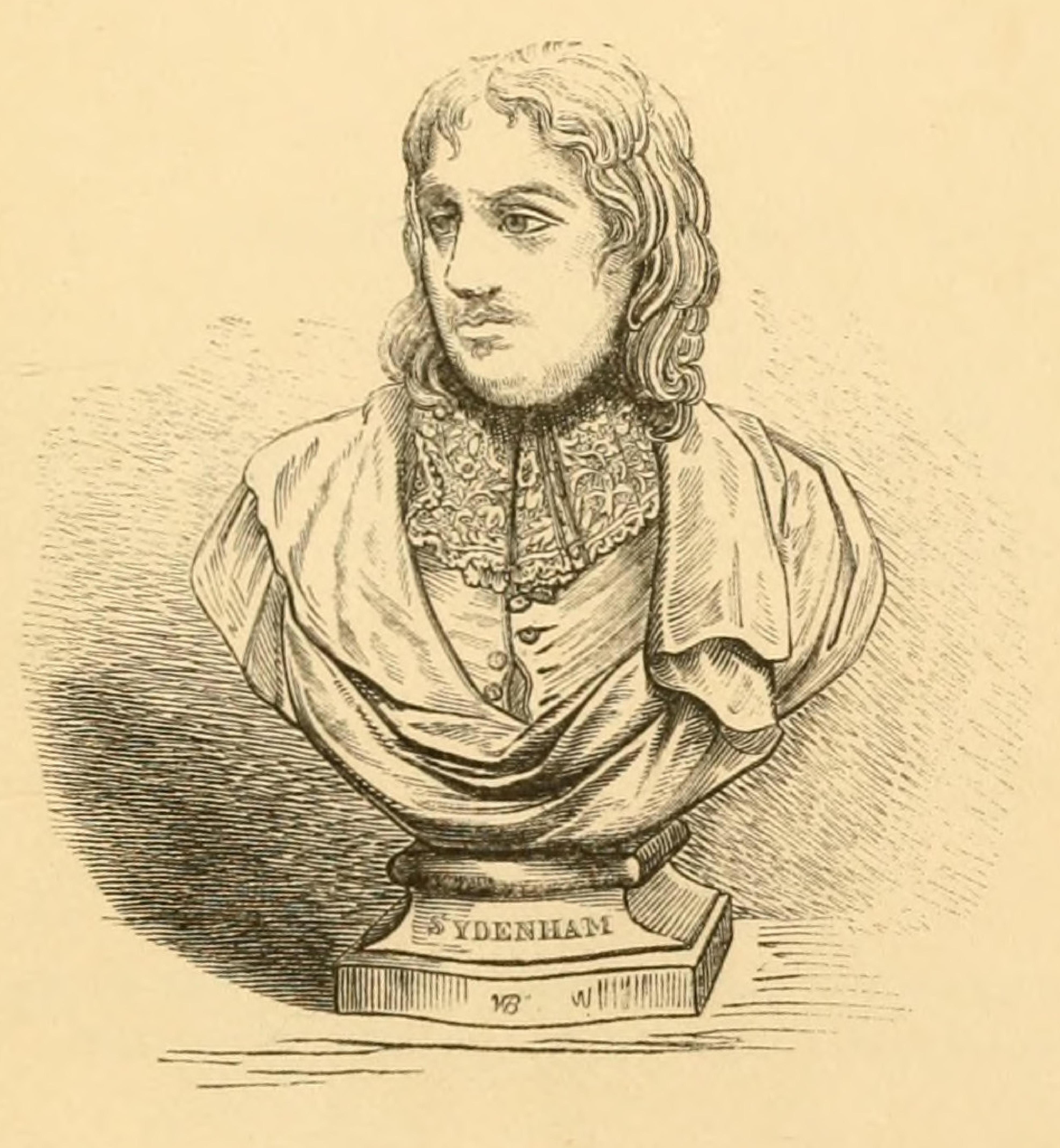
The symbol of the Society in the translation of Theodor Schwann's Microscopical Researches

The Sydenham Society was a medical society instituted in 1843 in London with the goal of improving the dissemination of medical text by means of translation. The society was considered "defunct" in late 1857 before being resurrected as the "New Sydenham Society" (1859–1907).

It was named after the English physician Thomas Sydenham (1624–89).

== Prospectus ==
The prospectus of the Society by the time of its foundation in 1843 stated that:

The Sydenham Society has been founded for the purpose of meeting certain acknowledged deficiencies in the diffusion of medical literature, which are not likely to be supplied by the efforts of individuals. It will carry this object into effect by distributing among its members —

1. Reprints of standard English medical works, which are rare and expensive.

2. Miscellaneous Selections from the ancient and from the earlier modern authors, reprinted or translated.

3. Digests of the most important matters contained in old and voluminous authors, British and foreign, with occasional biographical and bibliographical notices.

4. Translations of the Greek and Latin medical authors, and of works in the Arabic and other Eastern languages, accompanied, when it is thought desirable, by the original text.

5. Translations of recent foreign works of merit.

6. Original works of great merit, which might be very valuable as books of reference, but which would not otherwise be published, from not being likely to have a remunerating sale,—such as classified Bibliographies, and alphabetical Indexes to periodical publications and other valuable voluminous works.

== Translations ==
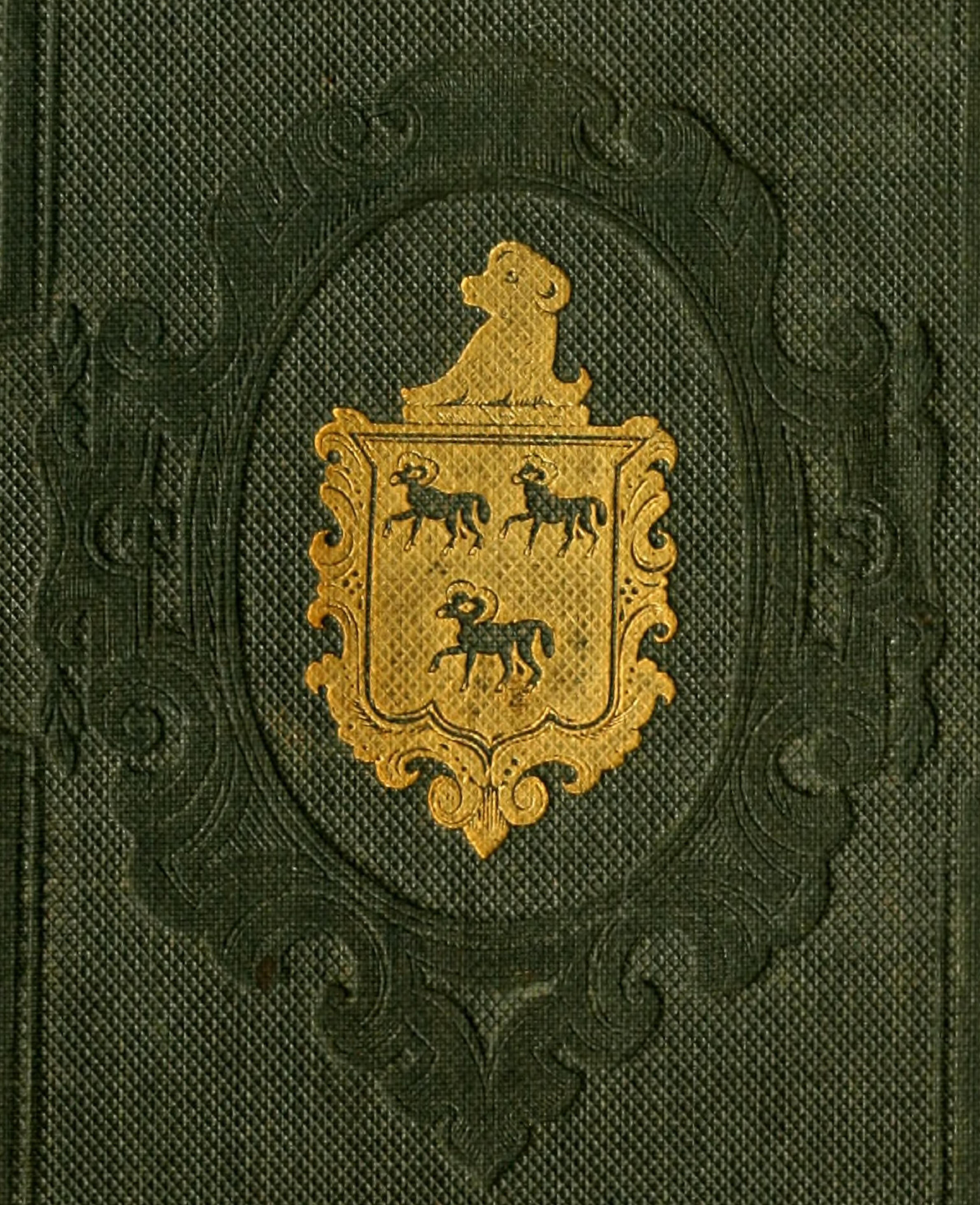
A coat of arms present in the cover of books edited by the society.

The members of the Society produced several medical translations. As of 1856, membership in the society costed five dollars. Every year, the members received "three volumes, handsomely bound in a uniform manner in cloth, gilt edged". New members could acquire any previous volume for two dollars and fifty cents, or combinations of 3 volumes for five dollars.

As of 2024, the works translated by the society have already fallen in the public domain and are available from online sources such as the Internet Archive.

The volumes edited by the society included:

Title	Author	Translator	Original language	Translation publication date	Source
Sydenhami Opera Omnia					
Hasse's Pathological Anatomy					
A treatise on the Smallpox and Measles	Rhazes	William Alexander Greenhill	Arabic	1848	
The Forks of Hewson, portrait and plates					
Dupuytren's Lectures on Diseases and Injuries of Bones					
Dupuytren on Lesions of the Vascular System &c.					
Memoirs of the French Academy of Surgery					
Feuchtersleben's Medical Psychology					
Microscopical Researches (Schwann) + Contributions to Phytogenesis (Schleiden)	Schwann and Schleiden	Henry Smith (presumably Henry Spencer Smith)	German	1847	
Works of W. Harvey, M.D					
Genuine Works of Hippocrates (2 volumes)					
Essays on Puerperal Fever, and other Diseases Peculiar to Women					
Works of Sydenham, translated from Latin (2 volumes)			Latin		
Unzer and Prochaska on the Nervous System					
Annals of Influenza					
Romberg on Diseases of the Nervous System (2 volumes)					
Manual of Human Histology (2 volumes)	Kölliker	George Busk and Thomas Huxley	German	1853	
Rokitansky's Pathological Anatomy (4 volumes)					
Hunter on the Gravid Uterus with 34 plates					
Wedl's Pathological Histology					
Oesterlen's Medical Logic					
Velpeau on Diseases of the Breast					
Works of Arataeus, Greek and English			Greek		

== Presidents ==
In the term 1849-1850, the society was presided by Sir James Clark.

Presidents of the New Society included renowned physicians Charles James Blasius Williams, Thomas Watson, James Paget, George Burrows, and Caesar Hawkins among others.
