= Swan neck =

Swan neck may refer to:

== Objects ==
- Swan neck, a curved spout for dispensing beer
- Swan neck duct, an air duct with a large change in mean radius
- Swan-neck bottle, a type of ornamental glass bottle made in Iran
- Swan neck flask, laboratory glassware designed to slow down the motion of air
- Swan-necked pediment, a variation of an architectural element
- Swan neck spur, a style of equestrian riding boot spur
- Swan-neck tow ball, a type of trailer tow ball

== People ==
- Edith Swan-neck, the first wife or mistress of King Harold II of England

== Conditions ==
- Swan neck deformity, a deformity of the human finger
