= Henry Spencer Smith =

English surgeon

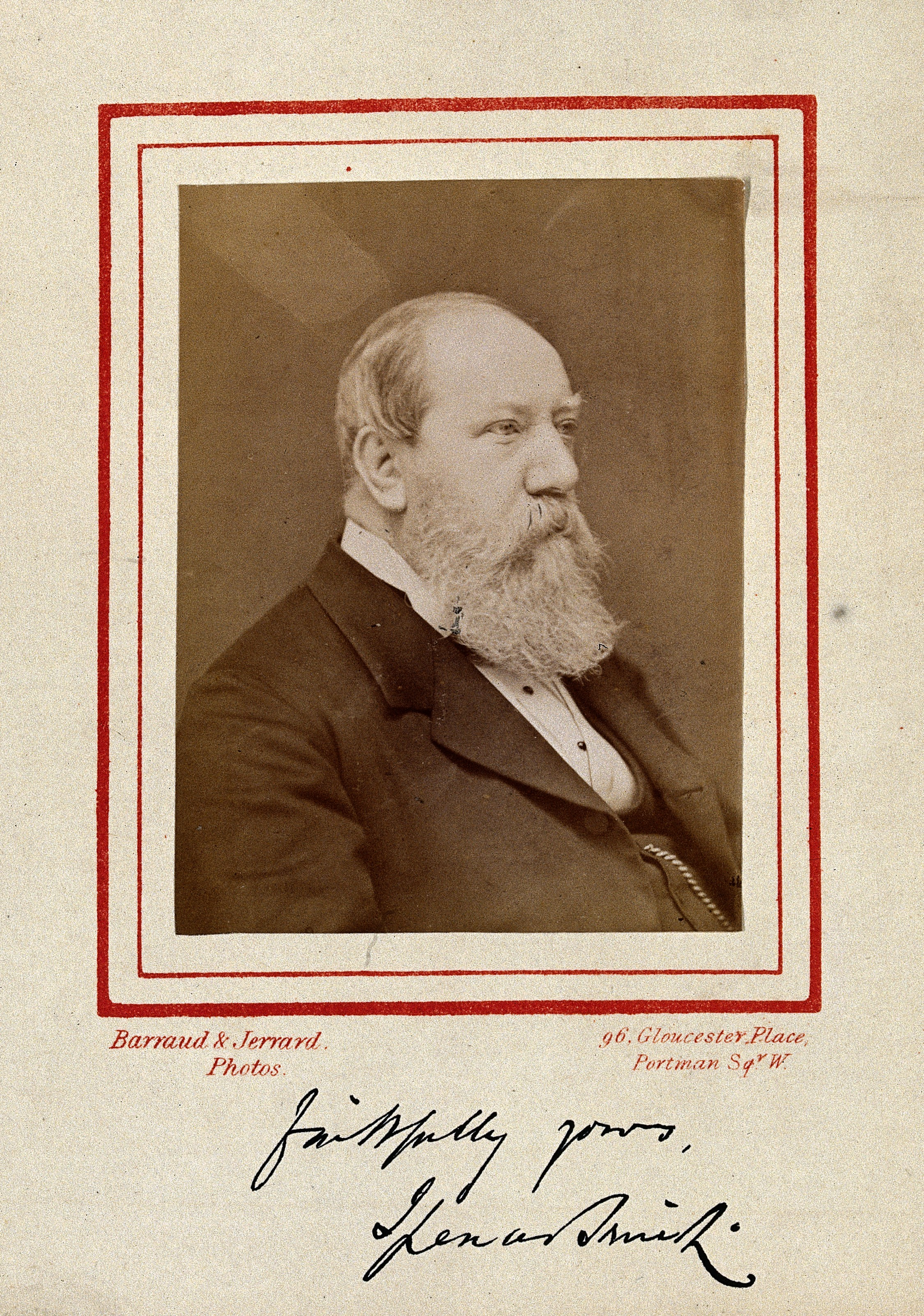
- Born: 12 September 1812; London
- Died: 29 November 1901 (aged 89)
- Occupation: Surgeon

Henry Spencer Smith (12 September 1812 – 29 November 1901) was an English surgeon.

== Biography ==
Smith was born in London on 12 September 1812. He was the younger son of George Spencer Smith, an estate agent, by Martha his wife. After education at Enfield he entered St. Bartholomew's Hospital in 1832, being apprenticed to Frederic Carpenter Skey, with whom he lived, and whose house surgeon he afterwards became. He was admitted M.R.C.S. in 1837, and in 1843 he was chosen one of the 150 persons upon whom the newly established degree of F.R.C.S. England, was conferred without examination; of this band he was the last survivor.

He proceeded to Paris in 1837, studying medicine there for six months, and from 1839 to 1841 he studied science in Berlin. On his return to England he was appointed surgeon to the Royal General Dispensary in Aldersgate Street, and he also lectured on surgery at Samuel Lane's school of medicine in Grosvenor Place. When St. Mary's Hospital was founded in 1851 Spencer Smith became senior assistant surgeon. Three years later, when the medical school of St. Mary's Hospital was instituted, he was chosen dean, and filled the office until 1860; for seventeen years he lectured on systematic surgery. He received from both colleagues and students valuable presentations on his resignation. He was member of the council of the Royal College of Surgeons of England (1867–75), and of the court of examiners (1872–7). He was secretary of the Royal Medical and Chirurgical Society of London (1855–88). Caring little for private practice, Smith gave both time and thought to the welfare of the newly founded St. Mary's Hospital and its medical school. He died at his house, 92 Oxford Terrace, W., on 29 November 1901. His library, rich in medical works of the sixteenth and seventeenth centuries as well as in editions of Thomas a Kempis and of Izaak Walton's The Compleat Angler, was sold by Messrs. Sotheby, Wilkinson, and Hodge on 14, 15, and 16 Nov. 1878, and on 17 and 18 June 1897. He married (1) Elizabeth Mortlock, daughter of John Sturges, by whom he had a son and a daughter; and (2) Louisa Theophila, daughter of the Rev. Gibson Lucas.

Smith translated from the German, for the Sydenham Society, Dr. Theodor Schwann's 'Microscopical Researches into the Accordance in the Structure and Growth of Animals and Plants' (1847) and Dr. M. J. Schleiden's 'Contributions to Phytogenesis' (in the same volume). These translations gave an impetus in this country to the microscopic study of the tissues.
