= Neue Notizen aus dem Gebiete der Natur- und Heilkunde =

German scientific publication

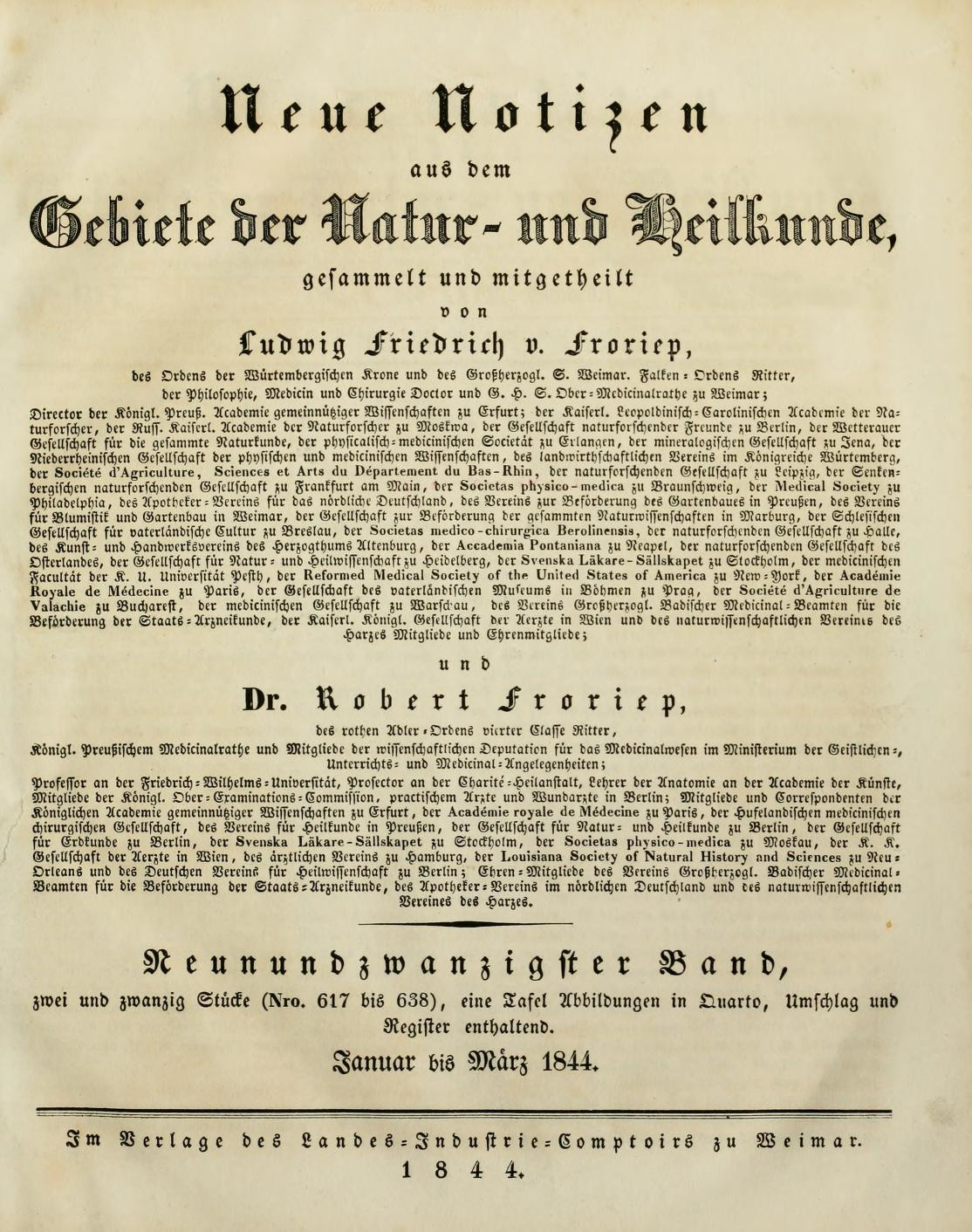
1844 title page

The Neue Notizen aus dem Gebiete der Natur- und Heilkunde ("new notices from the areas of nature and medicine") was a German publication of scientific discoveries by edited in Weimar by Ludwig Friedrich von Froriep and his son, Robert Froriep. Its first edition comprised publications from the period between January and March 1837.

It was a continuation of the former Notizen aus dem Gebiete der Natur- und Heilkunde, edited by Ludwig Friedrich von Froriep from 1821 until 1836.

== Notable publications ==
Among its notable publications were three articles by Theodor Schwann that preceded the inaugural book of the cell theory, Microscopical Researches in 1838 and the first ever translation to another language of a work by Charles Darwin (a small text on aerial navigation of spiders) in 1839.

In 1839, it published the first description of an oesophageal candidosis by Bernhard von Langenbeck.

In 1845, it published an article entitled Weisses Blut (white blood) by Rudolf Virchow, where he described a patient with multiple colorless corpuscles in the blood, a condition he named leukämie, thereby crafting the term leukemia, still used contemporaneously.
