= Spontaneous generation =

Theory of life arising from non-living matter

Spontaneous generation of seashells, according to Aristotle, varied with the nature of the seabed. Slime gave rise to oysters; sand, to scallops; and the hollows of rocks, to limpets and barnacles. People kept on wondering, though, whether the eggs of these animals might not be central to the generation process.

Spontaneous generation is a superseded scientific theory that held that living creatures could arise from non-living matter and that such processes were commonplace and regular. It was hypothesized that certain forms, such as fleas, could arise from inanimate matter such as dust, or that maggots could arise from dead flesh. The doctrine of spontaneous generation was coherently synthesized by the Greek philosopher and naturalist Aristotle, who compiled and expanded the work of earlier natural philosophers and the various ancient explanations for the appearance of organisms. Spontaneous generation was widely accepted for two millennia. Though challenged in the 17th and 18th centuries by the experiments of the Italian biologists Francesco Redi and Lazzaro Spallanzani, it was not discredited until the work of the French chemist Louis Pasteur and the Irish physicist John Tyndall in the mid-19th century.

Among biologists, rejecting spontaneous genesis is no longer controversial. Experiments conducted by Pasteur and others were thought to have refuted the conventional notion of spontaneous generation by the mid-1800s. Since all life appears to have evolved from a single form approximately four billion years ago, attention has instead turned to the origin of life.

== Description ==
"Spontaneous generation" means both the supposed processes by which different types of life might repeatedly emerge from specific sources other than seeds, eggs, or parents, and the theoretical principles presented in support of any such phenomena. Crucial to this doctrine are the ideas that life comes from non-life and that no causal agent, such as a parent, is needed. Supposed examples included the seasonal generation of mice and other animals from the mud of the Nile, the emergence of fleas from inanimate matter such as dust, or the appearance of maggots in dead flesh. Such ideas have something in common with the modern hypothesis of the origin of life, which asserts that life emerged some four billion years ago from non-living materials, over a time span of millions of years, and subsequently diversified into all the forms that now exist.

The term equivocal generation, sometimes known as heterogenesis or xenogenesis, describes the supposed process by which one form of life arises from a different, unrelated form, such as tapeworms from the bodies of their hosts.

== Antiquity ==
=== Pre-Socratic philosophers ===
Active in the 6th and 5th centuries BCE, early Greek philosophers, called physiologoi in antiquity (Greek: φυσιολόγοι; in English, physical or natural philosophers), attempted to give natural explanations of phenomena that had previously been ascribed to the agency of the gods. The physiologoi sought the material principle or arche (Greek: ἀρχή) of things, emphasizing the rational unity of the external world and rejecting theological or mythological explanations.

Anaximander, who believed that all things arose from the elemental nature of the universe, the apeiron (ἄπειρον) or the "unbounded" or "infinite", was likely the first western thinker to propose that life developed spontaneously from nonliving matter. The primal chaos of the apeiron, eternally in motion, served as a platform on which elemental opposites (e.g., wet and dry, hot and cold) generated and shaped the many and varied things in the world. According to Hippolytus of Rome in the third century CE, Anaximander had claimed that fish or fish-like creatures were first formed in the "wet" when acted on by the heat of the sun and that these aquatic creatures gave rise to human beings. The Roman author Censorinus, writing in the 3rd century, reported:

Anaximander of Miletus considered that from warmed up water and earth emerged either fish or entirely fishlike animals. Inside these animals, men took form and embryos were held prisoners until puberty; only then, after these animals burst open, could men and women come out, now able to feed themselves.

The Greek philosopher Anaximenes, a pupil of Anaximander, thought that air was the element that imparted life and endowed creatures with motion and thought. He proposed that plants and animals, including human beings, arose from a primordial terrestrial slime, a mixture of earth and water, combined with the sun's heat. The philosopher Anaxagoras, too, believed that life emerged from a terrestrial slime. However, Anaximenes held that the seeds of plants existed in the air from the beginning, and those of animals in the aether. Another philosopher, Xenophanes, traced the origin of man back to the transitional period between the fluid stage of the Earth and the formation of land, under the influence of the Sun.

In what has occasionally been seen as a prefiguration of a concept of natural selection, Empedocles accepted the spontaneous generation of life, but held that different forms, made up of differing combinations of parts, spontaneously arose as though by trial and error: successful combinations formed the individuals present in the observer's lifetime, whereas unsuccessful forms failed to reproduce.

=== Aristotle ===
In his biological works, the natural philosopher Aristotle theorized extensively the reproduction of various animals, whether by sexual, parthenogenetic, or spontaneous generation. In accordance with his fundamental theory of hylomorphism, which held that every physical entity was a compound of matter and form, Aristotle's basic theory of sexual reproduction contended that the male's seed imposed form, the set of characteristics passed down to offspring on the "matter" (menstrual blood) supplied by the female. Thus female matter is the material cause of generation—it supplies the matter that will constitute the offspring—while the male semen is the efficient cause, the factor that instigates and delineates the thing's existence. Yet, Aristotle proposed in the History of Animals, many creatures form not through sexual processes but by spontaneous generation:

Now there is one property that animals are found to have in common with plants. For some plants are generated from the seed of plants, whilst other plants are self-generated through the formation of some elemental principle similar to a seed; and of these latter plants some derive their nutriment from the ground, whilst others grow inside other plants ... So with animals, some spring from parent animals according to their kind, whilst others grow spontaneously and not from kindred stock; and of these instances of spontaneous generation some come from putrefying earth or vegetable matter, as is the case with a number of insects, while others are spontaneously generated in the inside of animals out of the secretions of their several organs.

— Aristotle, History of Animals, Book V, Part 1

According to this theory, living things may come forth from nonliving things in a manner roughly analogous to the "enformation of the female matter by the agency of the male seed" seen in sexual reproduction. Nonliving materials, like the seminal fluid present in sexual generation, contain pneuma (πνεῦμα, "breath"), or "vital heat". According to Aristotle, pneuma had more "heat" than regular air did, and this heat endowed the substance with certain vital properties:

The power of every soul seems to have shared in a different and more divine body than the so called [four] elements ... For every [animal], what makes the seed generative inheres in the seed and is called its "heat". But this is not fire or some such power, but instead the pneuma that is enclosed in the seed and in foamy matter, this being analogous to the element of the stars. This is why fire does not generate any animal ... but the heat of the sun and the heat of animals does, not only the heat that fills the seed, but also any other residue of [the animal's] nature that may exist similarly possesses this vital principle.

— Aristotle, Generation of Animals, 736b29ff.

Aristotle drew an analogy between the "foamy matter" (τὸ ἀφρῶδες, to aphrodes) found in nature and the "seed" of an animal, which he viewed as being a kind of foam itself (composed, as it was, from a mixture of water and pneuma). For Aristotle, the generative materials of male and female animals (semen and menstrual fluid) were essentially refinements, made by male and female bodies according to their respective proportions of heat, of ingested food, which was, in turn, a byproduct of the elements earth and water. Thus any creature, whether generated sexually from parents or spontaneously through the interaction of vital heat and elemental matter, was dependent on the proportions of pneuma and the various elements which Aristotle believed comprised all things. While Aristotle recognized that many living things emerged from putrefying matter, he pointed out that the putrefaction was not the source of life, but the byproduct of the action of the "sweet" element of water.

Animals and plants come into being in earth and in liquid because there is water in earth, and air in water, and in all air is vital heat so that in a sense all things are full of soul. Therefore living things form quickly whenever this air and vital heat are enclosed in anything. When they are so enclosed, the corporeal liquids being heated, there arises as it were a frothy bubble.

— Aristotle, Generation of Animals, Book III, Part 11

With varying degrees of observational confidence, Aristotle theorized the spontaneous generation of a range of creatures from different sorts of inanimate matter. The testaceans (a genus which for Aristotle included bivalves and snails), for instance, were characterized by spontaneous generation from mud, but differed based upon the precise material they grew in—for example, clams and scallops in sand, oysters in slime, and the barnacle and the limpet in the hollows of rocks.

=== Latin and early Christian sources ===
Athenaeus dissented towards spontaneous generation, claiming that a variety of anchovy did not generate from roe, as Aristotle stated, but rather, from sea foam.

As the dominant view of philosophers and thinkers continued to be in favour of spontaneous generation, some Christian theologians accepted the view. The Berber theologian and philosopher Augustine of Hippo discussed spontaneous generation in The City of God and The Literal Meaning of Genesis, citing Biblical passages such as "Let the waters bring forth abundantly the moving creature that hath life" (Genesis 1:20) as decrees that would enable ongoing creation.

== Middle Ages ==
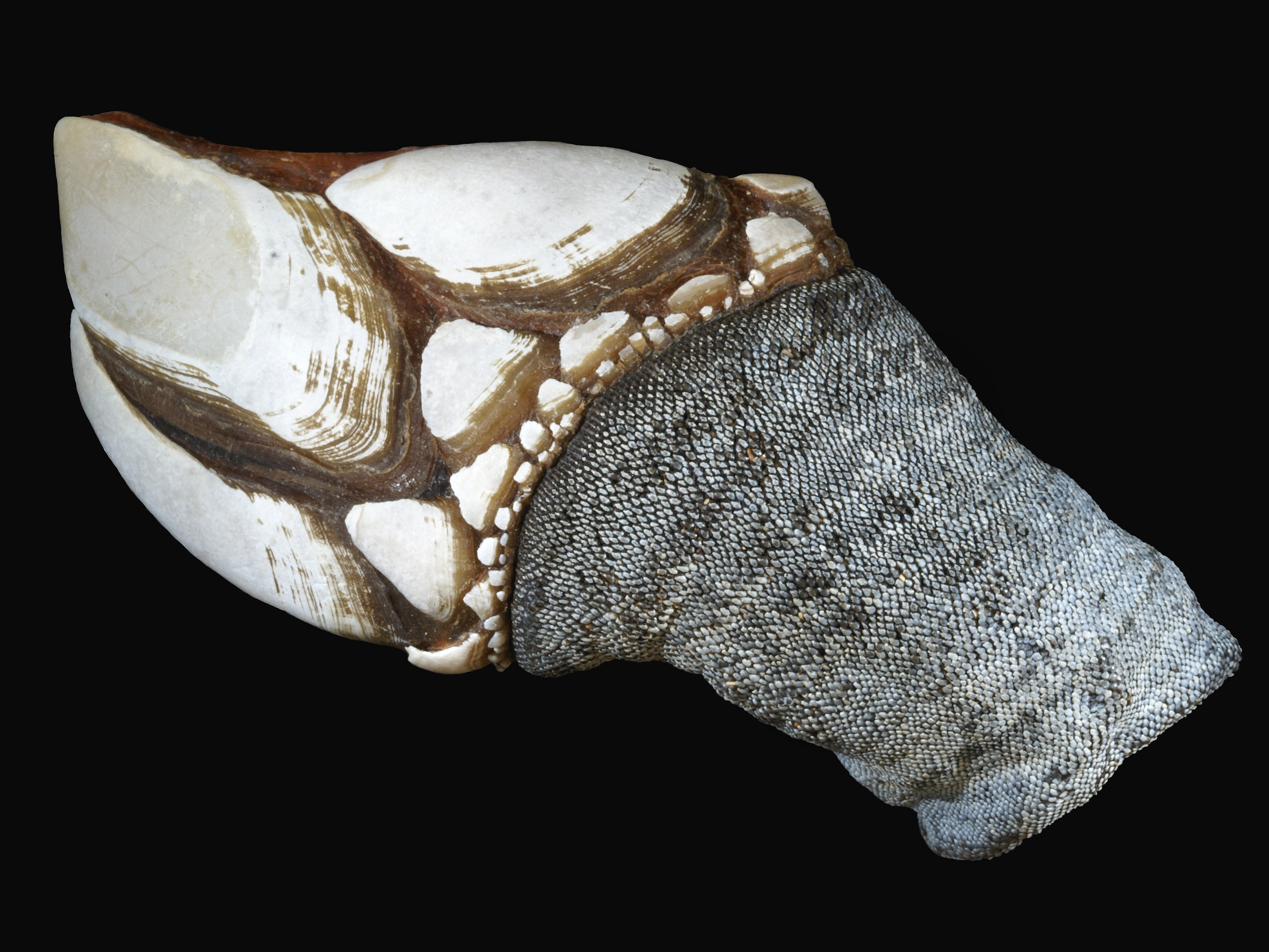
The goose barnacle

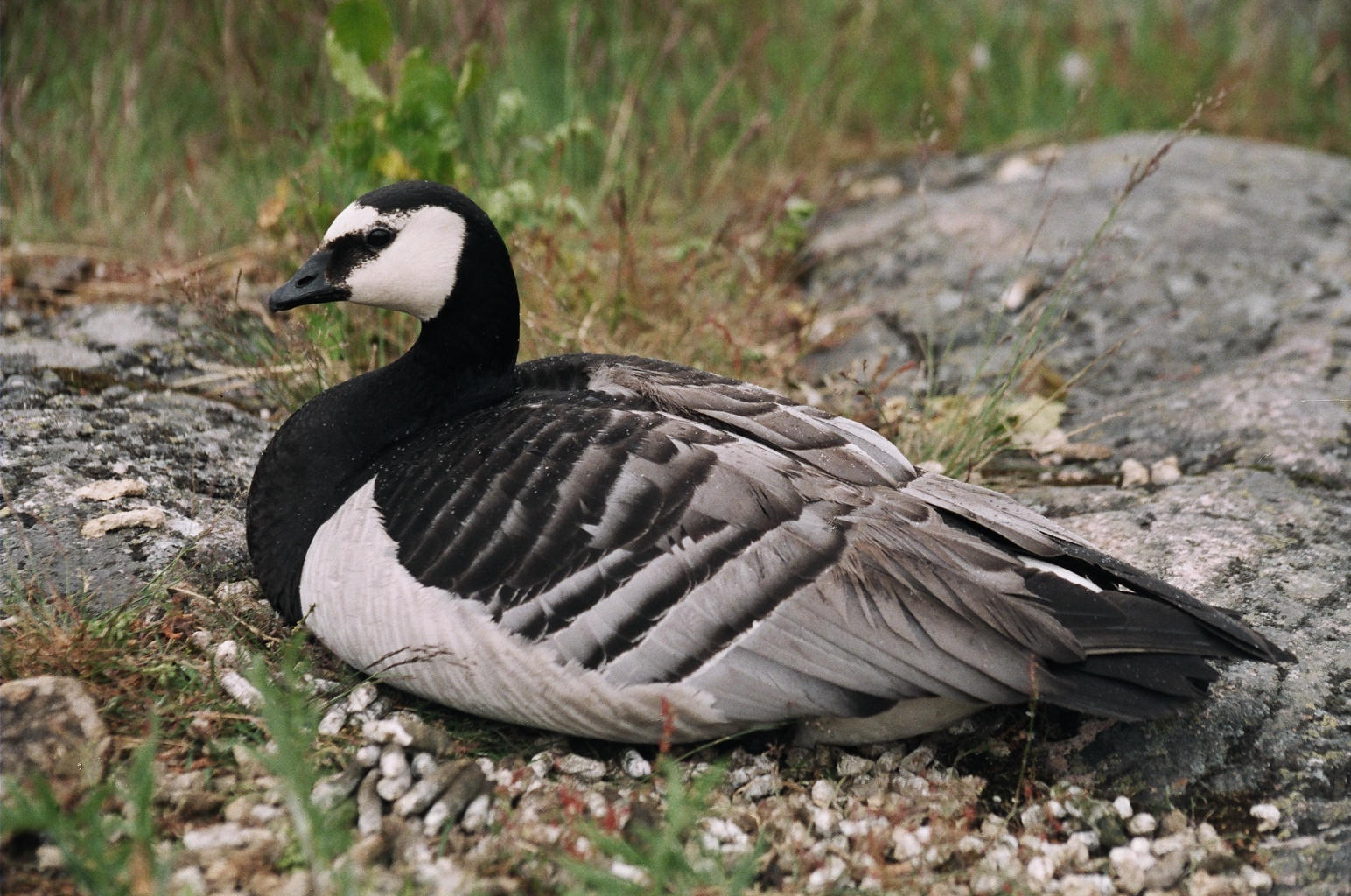
The barnacle goose

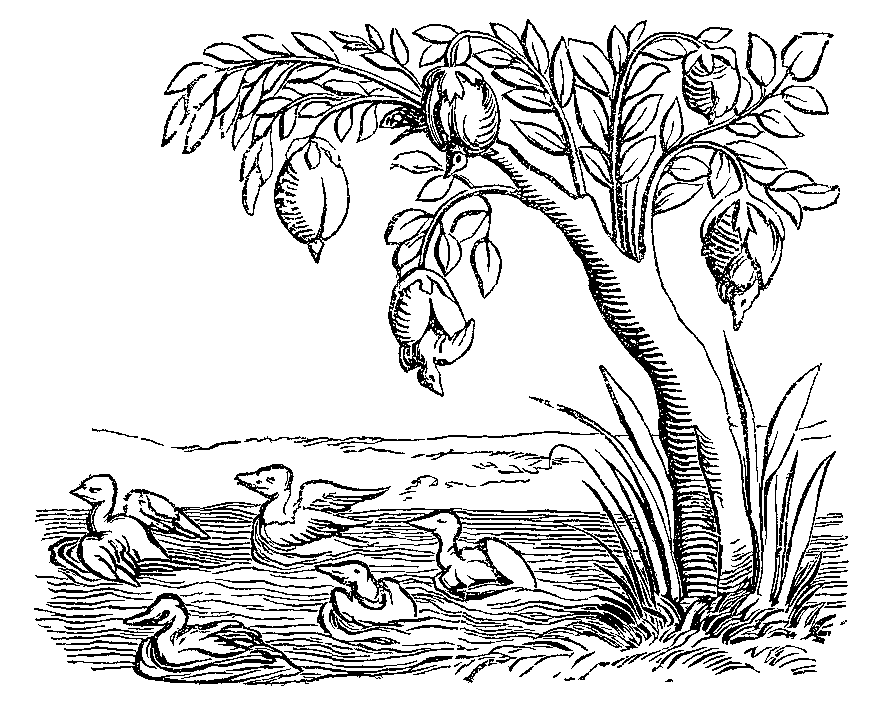
Barnacles turning into geese, in the 1552 Cosmographia. In the Middle Ages, it was thought that the goose barnacle gave birth to the barnacle goose, supporting the virgin birth of Jesus.

From the fall of the Roman Empire in 5th century to the East–West Schism in 1054, the influence of Greek science declined, although spontaneous generation generally went unchallenged. New descriptions were made. Of the beliefs, some had doctrinal implications. In 1188, Gerald of Wales, after having traveled in Ireland, argued that the barnacle goose myth was evidence for the virgin birth of Jesus. Where the practice of fasting during Lent allowed fish, but prohibited fowl, the idea that the goose was in fact a fish suggested that its consumption be permitted during Lent. The practice was eventually prohibited by decree of Pope Innocent III in 1215.

After Aristotle's works were reintroduced to Western Europe, they were translated into Latin from the original Greek or Arabic. They reached their greatest level of acceptance during the 13th century. With the availability of Latin translations, the German philosopher Albertus Magnus and his student Thomas Aquinas raised Aristotelianism to its greatest prominence. Albert wrote a paraphrase of Aristotle, De causis et processu universitatis, in which he removed some commentaries by Arabic scholars and incorporated others. The influential writings of Aquinas, on both the physical and metaphysical, are predominantly Aristotelian, but show numerous other influences.

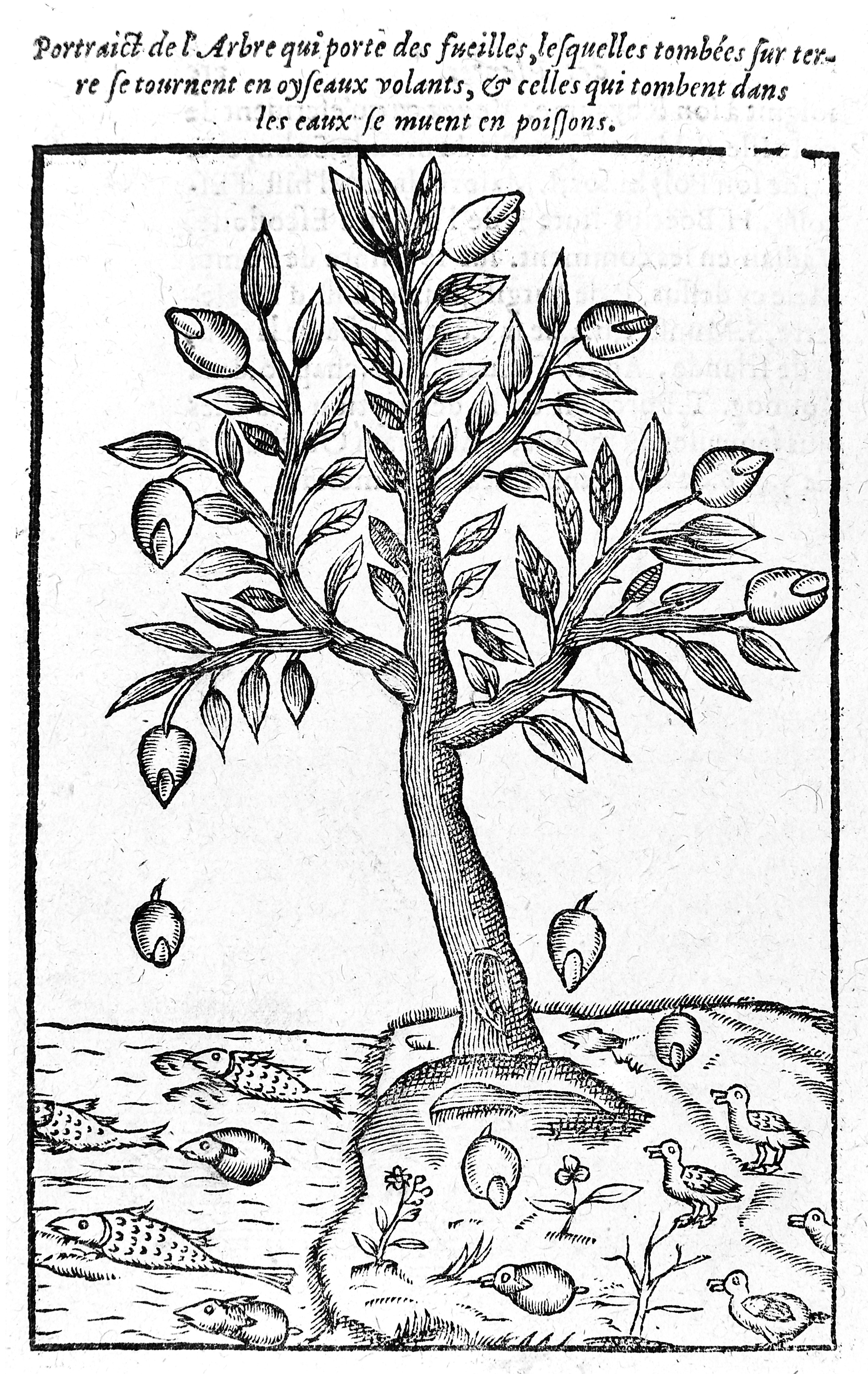
Claude Duret's 1605 Histoire admirable des plantes et herbes esmerueillables et miraculeuses en nature... illustrated numerous supposed examples of spontaneous generation, such as this tree generating both fishes and birds

Spontaneous generation is described in literature as if it were a fact well into the Renaissance. Shakespeare wrote of snakes and crocodiles forming from the mud of the Nile:

Lepidus: You've strange serpents there?
Antony: Ay, Lepidus.
Lepidus: Your serpent of Egypt is bred now of your mud by the operation of your sun; so is your crocodile.
Antony: They are so.

Shakespeare: Antony and Cleopatra: Act 2, scene 7

The author of The Compleat Angler, Izaak Walton repeats the question of the origin of eels "as rats and mice, and many other living creatures, are bred in Egypt, by the sun's heat when it shines upon the overflowing of the river...". While the ancient question of the origin of eels remained unanswered and the additional idea that eels reproduced from corruption of age was mentioned, the spontaneous generation of rats and mice stirred up no debate.

The Dutch biologist and microscopist Jan Swammerdam rejected the concept that one animal could arise from another or from putrification by chance because it was impious; he found the concept of spontaneous generation irreligious, and he associated it with atheism.

== Specific animals ==
- Frogs were believed to have spontaneously generated from mud.
- Mice were believed to become pregnant though the act of licking salt, or grew from the moisture of the earth.
- Snakes could generate from the marrow of the human spine.
- Eels had multiple stories. Aristotle claimed that eels emerged from earthworms, and were lacking in sex and milt, spawn and passages for these. Later authors dissented. The Roman author and natural historian Pliny the Elder did not argue against the anatomic limits of eels, but stated that eels reproduce by budding, scraping themselves against rocks, liberating particles that become eels.
- Bookworms could generate from excessive wind. Vitruvius, a Roman architect and writer of the 1st century BCE, advised that to stop their generation, libraries be placed facing eastwards to benefit from morning light, but not towards the south or the west as those winds were particularly offensive.
- Cicadas were generated from the spittle of the cuckoo.

== Experimental approach ==
=== Early tests ===
The Brussels physician Jan Baptist van Helmont described a recipe for mice (a piece of dirty cloth plus wheat for 21 days) and scorpions (basil, placed between two bricks and left in sunlight). His notes suggest he may have attempted to do these things.

Where Aristotle held that the embryo was formed by a coagulation in the uterus, the English physician William Harvey showed by way of dissection of deer that there was no visible embryo during the first month. Although his work predated the microscope, this led him to suggest that life came from invisible eggs. In the frontispiece of his 1651 book Exercitationes de Generatione Animalium (Essays on the Generation of Animals), he denied spontaneous generation with the motto omnia ex ovo ("everything from eggs").

Illustration of Redi's 1668 experiment to refute spontaneous generation

The ancient beliefs were subjected to testing. In 1668, the Italian physician and parasitologist Francesco Redi challenged the idea that maggots arose spontaneously from rotting meat. In the first major experiment to challenge spontaneous generation, he placed meat in a variety of sealed, open, and partially covered containers. Realizing that the sealed containers were deprived of air, he used "fine Naples veil", and observed no worms on the meat, but they appeared on the cloth. Redi used his experiments to support the preexistence theory put forth by the Catholic Church at that time, which maintained that living things originated from parents. In scientific circles Redi's work very soon had great influence, as evidenced in a letter from the English natural theologian John Ray in 1671 to members of the Royal Society of London, in which he calls the spontaneous generation of insects "unlikely".

Pier Antonio Micheli, c. 1729, observed that when fungal spores were placed on slices of melon, the same type of fungi were produced that the spores came from, and from this observation he noted that fungi did not arise from spontaneous generation.

In 1745, John Needham performed a series of experiments on boiled broths. Believing that boiling would kill all living things, he showed that when sealed right after boiling, the broths would cloud, allowing the belief in spontaneous generation to persist. His studies were rigorously scrutinized by his peers, and many of them agreed.

Lazzaro Spallanzani did an extensive variety of observations and experiments that modified the experiments of Needham in 1768, where he attempted to exclude the possibility of introducing a contaminating factor between boiling and sealing. His technique involved boiling the broth in a sealed container with the air partially evacuated to prevent explosions. Although he did not see growth, the exclusion of air left the question of whether air was an essential factor in spontaneous generation. But attitudes were changing; by the start of the 19th century, a scientist such as Joseph Priestley could write that "There is nothing in modern philosophy that appears to me so extraordinary, as the revival of what has long been considered as the exploded doctrine of equivocal, or, as Dr. [Erasmus] Darwin calls it, spontaneous generation."

In 1837, Charles Cagniard de la Tour, a physicist, and Theodor Schwann, one of the founders of cell theory, published their independent discovery of yeast in alcoholic fermentation. They used the microscope to examine foam left over from the process of brewing beer. Where the Dutch microscopist Antonie van Leeuwenhoek described "small spheroid globules", they observed yeast cells undergo cell division. Fermentation would not occur when sterile air or pure oxygen was introduced if yeast were not present. This suggested that airborne microorganisms, not spontaneous generation, was responsible.

However, although the idea of spontaneous generation had been in decline for nearly a century, its supporters did not abandon it all at once. As James Rennie wrote in 1838, despite Redi's experiments, "distinguished naturalists, such as Blumenbach, Cuvier, Bory de St. Vincent, R. Brown, &c." continued to support the theory.

=== Pasteur and Tyndall ===
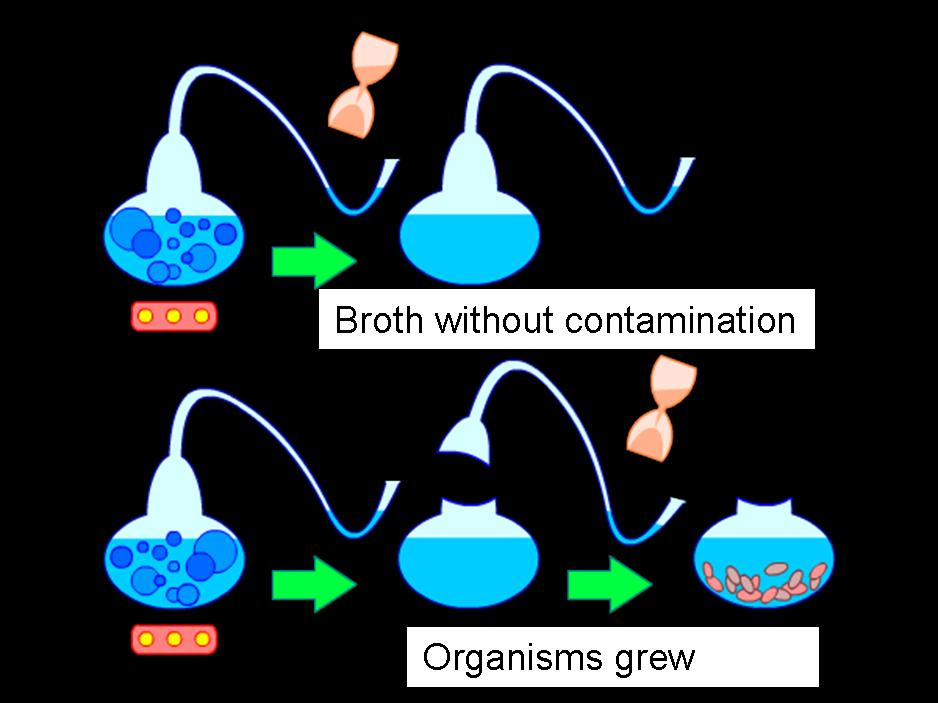
Louis Pasteur's 1859 experiment showed that a boiled nutrient broth did not give rise spontaneously to new life, but that if direct access to air was permitted, the broth decomposed, implying that small organisms (in modern terms, microbial spores) had fallen in and started to grow in the broth.

Louis Pasteur's experiment's in the late 1850s are widely seen as having settled the question of spontaneous generation. He boiled a meat broth in a swan neck flask; the bend in the neck of the flask prevented falling particles from reaching the broth, while still allowing the free flow of air. The flask remained free of growth for an extended period. When the flask was turned so that particles could fall down the bends, the broth quickly became clouded. However, minority objections were persistent and not always unreasonable, given that the experimental difficulties were far more challenging than the popular accounts suggest. The investigations of the Irish physician John Tyndall, a correspondent of Pasteur and an admirer of his work, were decisive in disproving spontaneous generation. All the same, Tyndall encountered difficulties in dealing with microbial spores, which were not well understood in his day. Like Pasteur, he boiled his cultures to sterilize them, and some types of bacterial spores can survive boiling. The autoclave, which eventually came into universal application in medical practice and microbiology to sterilise equipment, was introduced after these experiments.

In 1862, the French Academy of Sciences paid special attention to the issue, establishing a prize "to him who by well-conducted experiments throws new light on the question of the so-called spontaneous generation" and appointed a commission to judge the winner. Pasteur and others used the term biogenesis as the opposite of spontaneous generation, to mean that life was generated only from other life. Pasteur's claim followed the German physician Rudolf Virchow's doctrine Omnis cellula e cellula ("all cells from cells"), itself derived from the work of Robert Remak. After Pasteur's 1859 experiment, the term "spontaneous generation" fell out of favor. Experimentalists used a variety of terms for the study of the origin of life from nonliving materials. Heterogenesis was applied to the generation of living things from once-living organic matter (such as boiled broths), and the English physiologist Henry Charlton Bastian proposed the term archebiosis for life originating from non-living materials. Disliking the randomness and unpredictability implied by the term spontaneous generation, in 1870 Bastian used the term biogenesis for the formation of life from nonliving matter. Soon thereafter, however, the English biologist Thomas Henry Huxley proposed the term abiogenesis for this same process, and adopted biogenesis for the process by which life arises from existing life.

== See also ==
- Bugonia
- Barnacle goose myth
- Origin of life
