= Geison (disambiguation) =

Geison is an architectural term, particularly relevant to ancient Greek and Roman buildings.

Geison may also refer to:

- Gerald L. Geison (1943-2001), American historian
- Geison Moura (born 1986), Brazilian football striker
- Geison (footballer) (Geison Rodrigues Marrote; born 1987), Brazilian football striker
