= John Farley =

John Farley may refer to:

- John H. Farley (1846–1922), mayor of Cleveland, Ohio
- John Murphy Farley (1842–1918), Irish-American Roman Catholic archbishop and cardinal
- John Farley (pilot) (1933–2018), British test pilot
- John Farley (historian) (1936–2015), Canadian science historian
- John Farley (actor) (born 1968), American actor and comedian
- John Wells Farley (1878–1959), American football player and coach
- John W. Farley (1948–2022), American physicist
- John J. Farley III (born 1942), judge of the United States Court of Appeals
- John Farley (footballer) (born 1951), English footballer see List of Bury F.C. players (25–99 appearances)
- John Farley (MP), member of parliament (MP) for Gloucester

== See also ==
- John Farley Leith (1808–1887), MP for Aberdeen
- John Farleigh (1900–1965), English engraver and illustrator
