= Liebig–Pasteur dispute =

Historic academic dispute over fermentation

Liebig–Pasteur dispute is the dispute between Justus von Liebig and Louis Pasteur on the processes and causes of fermentation.

== Dispute overview ==
Louis Pasteur a French chemist, supported the idea that fermentation was a biological process. Justus von Liebig, a German chemist, supported the idea that fermentation was a mechanical process. Both chemists had different methods of experimentation, and they focused on different aspects of fermentation because they had different ideas about where the fermentation began in an organism.

The Liebig–Pasteur feud started in 1857 when Pasteur said that fermentation can occur in the absence of oxygen. The two were aware of the other's works, but continued working with their own theories. The two mention each other, as well as other scientists, in articles and other publications about the processes and causes of fermentation.

== Pasteur’s position ==
Pasteur observed that fermentation does not require oxygen, but needs yeast, which is alive. Fermentation is a biological process, not a reduction and oxygen chemical process. He used two slender bottles. One of the bottles had a curved neck; this is called a swan neck. Pasteur poured liquid broth into the two bottles, and heated the bottom of the bottles. When the liquid boiled, he let them cool. Pasteur observed that the broth in the curved bottle stayed clear, except when the bottle was shaken.

Pasteur explained that the two bottles were filled with air, but the curved bottle could stop most of the particles in the air, and it kept its nature. However, the liquid in the other bottle degenerated. Therefore, he concluded that fermentation does not require oxygen, but needs the yeast. When yeast is allowed to grow over time, the substance will spoil or rot.

Pasteur viewed fermentation as a type of vitalism. He observed that living organisms were responsible for the process of fermentation.

== Liebig’s position ==
Liebig formulated his own theory claiming that the production of alcohol was not a biological process but a chemical process, discrediting the idea that fermentation could occur due to microscopic organisms. He believed that vibrations emanating from the decomposition of organic matter would spread to the sugar resulting in the production of solely carbon dioxide and alcohol.

The change was facilitated by ferment or yeast, which has the characters of a compound of nitrogen in the state of putrefaction. Given that the ferment's susceptibility to change, it is submitted to decomposition, by the action of air (from which oxygen is provided), water (from which moisture is obtained), and a favorable temperature. Prior to contact with oxygen, the constituents are arranged together without action on each other. Through the oxygen, the state of rest (or equilibrium) of the attractions that keep the elements together has been disturbed. As a consequence of this disturbance, a separation or new arrangement of the elements has been formed. Fermentation occurs due to the transference of molecular instability from the ferment (atoms in motion) to the sugar molecules, and continues as long as the decomposition of the ferment continues.

Liebig's view of fermentation can be said to fall under a mechanism point of view. From his work, he saw that fermentation, as well as other catalysts happened by a chemical and mechanical process.

== Liebig–Pasteur communications ==
Pasteur responded to Liebig's works, often through his own writings, and using results from his own experiments to support his theories. For example, in 1858, Pasteur wrote a paper trying to disprove Liebig's theory that fermentation cannot be caused by the growth of the yeast when it takes place when yeast is added to pure sugar-water. Pasteur thought that in pure sugar-water, yeast was both growing and disintegrating, and developed experiments to support his theories. Liebig, however, was not convinced, and claimed that Pasteur was not solving the questions he had about the decomposition in fermentation.

In 1869, Liebig responded to Pasteur's challenge, which he had made public ten years before. Liebig still held this ground, and mentioned that some of Pasteur's experiments were difficult to replicate and use effectively. Pasteur was furious, and suggested the Royal Academy hire a third scientist who would replicate his experiments and verify his results in order to support his theories. Neither Liebig nor the Academy responded.

Later, Pasteur demanded a meeting with Liebig, but Liebig did not him receive cordially, and refused to discuss the topic of fermentation.

== Eduard Büchner ==
=== Discovery of the active agent of fermentation ===
The famous controversy between Pasteur and Liebig over the nature of alcoholic fermentation was uncovered by Eduard Büchner, a German chemist and zymologist. Influenced by his brother Hans, who became the famous bacteriologist, Büchner developed an interest in the fermentation process in which yeast breaks down sugar into alcohol and carbon dioxide. He published his first paper in 1885 which revealed that fermentation could occur in the presence of oxygen, a conclusion contrary to the view held by Louis Pasteur.

By 1893, Büchner was fully involved in seeking the active agent of fermentation. He obtained pure samples of the inner fluid of yeast cells by pulverizing yeast within a mixture of sand and diatomaceous earth, then squeezing the mixture through a canvas filter. This process avoided using solvents and high temperatures which had foiled previous investigations. He assumed that the collected fluid was incapable of producing fermentation because the yeast cells were dead. However, when he attempted to preserve the fluid in concentrated sugar, he was startled to observe carbon dioxide being released, a sign that fermentation was taking place. Büchner hypothesized that the fermentation was caused by an enzyme which he named zymase. His findings that fermentation was the result of chemical process both inside and outside cells, were published in 1897.

== Legacies of the Liebig–Pasteur dispute ==
Neither Liebig nor Pasteur was completely right. However, each of their arguments led to more discoveries that created a lot of today's fields in science and medicine.

Berzelius had defined the word "ferment" as being an example of catalytic activity. Soon after, Schwann discovered pepsin was the substance responsible for albuminous digestion in the stomach. He believed this was what Berzelius defined as catalysts, or the force for chemical reactions of mineral, organic and living matter. Liebig opposed the idea by saying that the terms catalysts and pepsin are not supposed to be used as they are only representatives of an idea.

Charles Cagniard-Latour, Theodor Schwann and Friedrich Traugott Kützing identified independently yeast as a living organism that nourishes itself by the sugar it ferments, a process which referred to the ethanol fermentation (alcoholic fermentation). Liebig, Berzelius, and Wohler rejected the ideas of Schwann, Latour and Kutzing. In 1839, Liebig and Wohler published a paper on the role of yeast in alcoholic fermentation. In 1858, Liebig's student Moritz Traube enunciated the theorem, which was used for alcoholic fermentation, that all fermentations produced by living organisms are based on chemical reactions rather than a vital force itself.

The dispute between Liebig and Pasteur had, in a way, slowed down the advances of science and medicine in the area of fermentation, alcohol fermentation, and the enzymes. On the other hand, the conflicting ideas sped up the research in the area of fermentation and enzymes through other scientists and chemists. Through Büchner and his experiment in fermentation, the world of science and medicine went further as to pave ways in enzyme and fermentation studies and marked one of the critical points of the history of modern chemistry.
