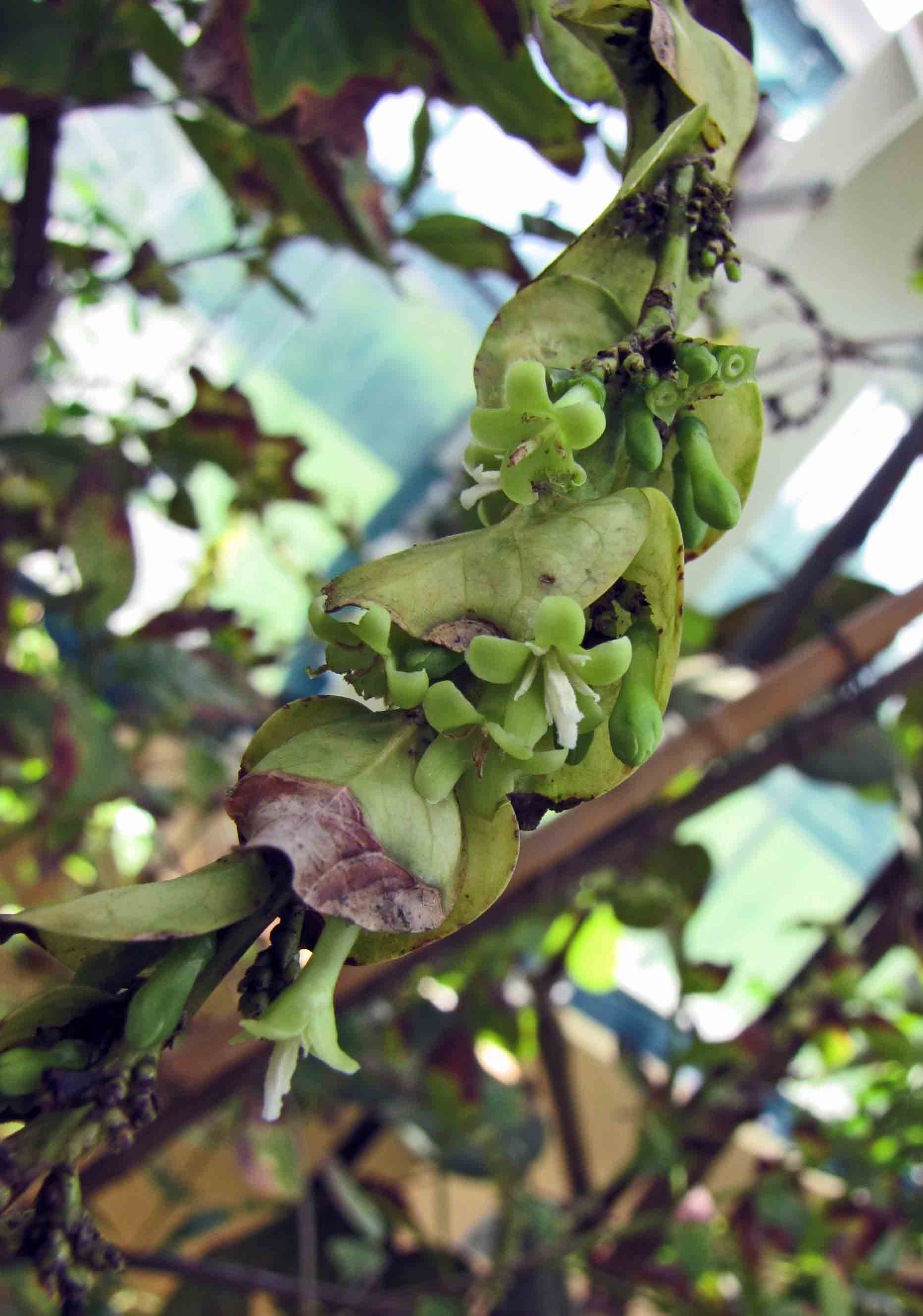
- Pouchetia

Scientific classification
- Kingdom: Plantae
- Clade: Tracheophytes
- Clade: Angiosperms
- Clade: Eudicots
- Clade: Asterids
- Order: Gentianales
- Family: Rubiaceae
- Genus: Pouchetia; A.Rich. ex DC.

= Pouchetia =

Genus of plants

Pouchetia is a genus of flowering plants belonging to the family Rubiaceae.

Its native range is western Tropical Africa. It is found in Angola, Benin, Burkina, Cabinda, Central African Repu, Congo, Gabon, Gambia, Ghana, Guinea, Guinea-Bissau, Gulf of Guinea Is., Ivory Coast, Liberia, Mali, Nigeria, Senegal, Sierra Leone, Sudan, Togo and Zaïre.

The genus name of Pouchetia is in honour of Félix Archimède Pouchet (1800–1872), a French naturalist and a leading proponent of spontaneous generation of life from non-living materials, and as such an opponent of Louis Pasteur's germ theory. It was first described and published in Prodr. Vol.4 on page 393 in 1830.

== Known species ==
According to Kew:

- Pouchetia africana A.Rich. ex DC.
- Pouchetia baumanniana Büttner
- Pouchetia confertiflora Mildbr.
- Pouchetia parviflora Benth.
