= Gerald L. Geison =

- Born: March 26, 1943; Savanna, Illinois
- Died: July 3, 2001 (aged 58); Princeton, New Jersey
- Education: Yale University; Beloit College
- Scientific career
- Fields: History
- Workplaces: Princeton University

Gerald Lynn Geison (March 26, 1943 – July 3, 2001) was an American historian who worked on biology in the nineteenth century. His biography of Louis Pasteur generated great controversy when it was published in 1995.

== Opinions on his work ==
- "His biography of Pasteur was viewed as an outstanding work of scholarship which penetrated the secrecy that had surrounded much of the legendary scientist's laboratory work. Geison used Pasteur's laboratory notebooks and published papers to described some of the most famous episodes in the history of science—including their darker sides, such as the human risks entailed in Pasteur's haste to develop the rabies vaccine. A reviewer wrote in the New England Journal of Medicine that the book 'requires us to reevaluate our heroes and consider the complexities of science instead of merely clinging to comforting and heroic myths.' "
- "A quite different (from Bruno Latour's) approach to Pasteur has recently been taken by Gerald L. Geison in The Private Science of Louis Pasteur. Geison utilizes the French national hero’s private laboratory notebooks to reveal striking discrepancies between them and his public pronouncements. Although Geison’s aim is not to detract from Pasteur’s greatness as a scientist, but rather to present a “Pasteur for our times,” his book has been criticized by scientists who apparently feel that any de-hagiographication of this towering figure amounts to an attack on science as such"
- "the finally published book of the only historian really specialized in the history of Pasteur."
- Max Perutz came to a very unfavorable conclusion about Geison's life of Pasteur: "Toppling great men from their pedestals, sometimes on the slenderest of evidence, has become a fashionable and lucrative industry, and a safe one, since they cannot sue because they are dead. Geison is in good company, but he, rather than Pasteur, seems to me guilty of unethical and unsavory conduct when he burrows through Pasteur’s notebooks for scraps of supposed wrongdoing and then inflates these out of all proportion, in order to drag Pasteur down. In fact, his evidence is contrived, and does not survive scientific examination." New York Review of Books, December 21, 1995
- In a 1999 article and a 2003 book, D. Raynaud concludes that the apology for Félix Pouchet presented by John Farley and Geison in their 1974 article on the controversy between Pouchet and Pasteur is futile.
- In a work published in 2019, Joseph Gal, of the University of Colorado Denver, concludes that Geison's criticisms of Pasteur's work on the chirality of molecules are "entirely without scientific basis".
