= Swan neck flask =

Flask with a curved neck that traps particulate

Louis Pasteur's spontaneous generation experiment illustrates that liquid nutrients are spoiled by particles in the air rather than the air itself. These results of these experiments supported the germ theory of disease.

A swan neck flask, also known as a gooseneck flask, is a round-bottom flask with a narrow s-shaped tube as its opening to reduce contact between the inner contents and external environment. The motion of air through the tube is slowed and aerosolized bacteria or other particles in the air tend to become trapped by moisture on the tube's inner surfaces. The contents of the flask thus remain free of microbes, a property showcased by French microbiologist Louis Pasteur in nineteenth century experiments used to support germ theory as the cause of fermentation over spontaneous generation from bad air (miasma).

Bottle en col de cygne (Swan neck bottle) used by Louis Pasteur

== Background ==
By the middle of the nineteenth century, the question of whether living organisms could arise from non-living matter had been debated for roughly two hundred years. Earlier experimenters, notably Theodor Schwann in 1837, had shown that boiled meat infusions could be kept from spoiling in flasks supplied with air that had been heated or otherwise treated. Experiments of this kind often failed with other substances such as milk or egg yolk, which helped sustain the view that something like spontaneous generation could occur. In 1859 the naturalist Félix Archimède Pouchet published Hétérogénie, ou Traité de la génération spontanée, a book-length report of experiments that he argued supported spontaneous generation. Pasteur had doubted Pouchet's evidence from the outset, holding that Pouchet's experiments had been contaminated by germs, and the two became rivals in a public dispute that ran from 1859 to 1864.

== Pasteur's experiments ==
Pasteur described the swan neck flask experiments in a long memoir, based on a lecture given to the Société chimique de Paris on 19 May 1861 and published in the Annales de chimie et de physique. In one of his most decisive experiments, a nutritious meat broth was heated to sterilization in a flask whose neck was drawn out into a long, curved tube with a narrow opening. The flask was sealed after sterilization and later opened, so that the broth was exposed to the surrounding air. This design answered Pouchet's claim that the oxygen in air was needed for life to arise, because the broth now had free access to air, yet most samples remained unspoiled.

The result depended on the neck. If the neck was broken off close to the body of the flask so that air touched the liquid directly, the broth quickly turned cloudy. The same happened when an intact flask was tilted or shaken so that the liquid reached the inner surface of the neck, where particles had settled. From this Pasteur concluded that airborne microscopic particles, rather than the air itself or a "vital force" in it, carried the organisms that caused spoilage. Pouchet continued to defend his position and argued that Pasteur's prolonged heating had destroyed the broth's capacity to support life. Pouchet eventually withdrew from the prize competition that the French Academy of Sciences had set on the question, in November 1862, and Pasteur received the award.

== Mechanism ==
The S-shaped or downward-curving neck acts as a passive filter. Air can still move in and out of the flask as the temperature changes, but dust and bacteria-bearing particles settle or adhere to the moist glass of the bend, so they do not reach the liquid. The flask therefore needs no stopper, cotton plug or other closure, and the contents remain in contact with air while staying sterile. Because the sterility depends on the particles being trapped on the glass, it is lost once the liquid is allowed to wash over the trapped material.

== Historical interpretation ==
The standard account of the swan neck flask experiments treats them as a decisive victory of experimental method over superstition. This account was challenged in 1974 by historians John Farley and Gerald Geison, who argued that Pasteur's success owed much to political, religious and ideological support, and that Pouchet's experiments were not clearly inferior to Pasteur's. Geison later developed this line of argument in a biography based on Pasteur's private laboratory notebooks. Roll-Hansen responded that the dispute turned mainly on the outcomes of specific experiments rather than on general theories for or against spontaneous generation.

== Legacy ==
The flask is one of the best-known pieces of laboratory glassware in the history of biology and is widely used in teaching as a demonstration of the origin of microbial contamination. Replica flasks made by the Pasteur Institute are held in museum collections such as that of the Science Museum Group in London. Glassblowers at the Institut Pasteur made swan-necked flasks, along with other glassware such as Pasteur pipettes, for the institute's scientists.

== See also ==
- Gooseneck (piping)
- Spontaneous generation
- Germ theory of disease
- Félix Archimède Pouchet
