= Muséum d'Histoire Naturelle de Rouen =

Museum in France

Coordinates: 49°26′49.5″N 1°5′57.5″E

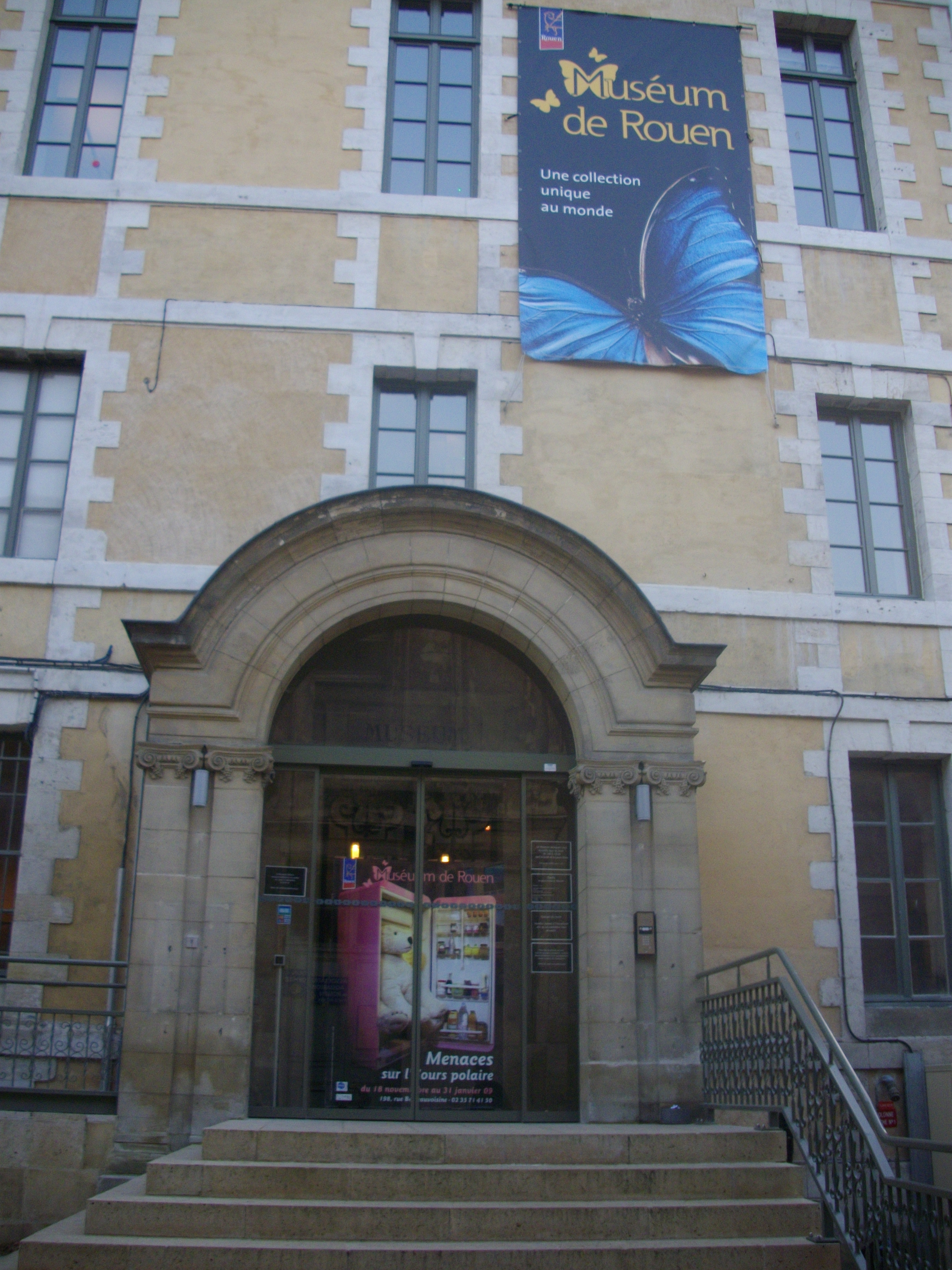
- Established: 1828
- Type: Natural history museum
- Website: museumderouen.fr/en

The Muséum d'Histoire Naturelle de Rouen (Natural History Museum) is a museum in Rouen, northern France, founded in 1828 by Félix Archimède Pouchet. Georges Pennetier was the second curator from 1873 to 1923, then Robert Régnier from 1924 to 1965. In October 2014, the museum of Rouen opened the Asian section of the gallery of the continents, the result of several years of cooperation with in particular Agus Koeciank and Jenny Lee, two Indonesian artists who have interpreted the Asian ethnographic collections of the museum of Rouen. It has been part of the Réunion des Musées Métropolitains Rouen Normandie since January 1, 2016. After the Muséum national d'histoire naturelle in Paris it is the second largest natural history museum in France. It preserves more than 500,000 objects from all over the world.

== Bibliography ==
- Georges Pennetier, « Le Muséum de Rouen en 1900, historique, description, catalogue sommaire », dans Actes du Muséum d'histoire naturelle de Rouen, fasc., Rouen, 1900
- Monique Fouray et Michel Lerond, Le 150th anniversaire du Muséum de Rouen : Historique, évolution de la muséologie en sciences naturelles, Centre de documentation du Muséum d'histoire naturelle de Rouen, 1978
- Benoît Eliot et Stéphane Rioland, Un Carnet de voyages, le muséum de Rouen, éd. Point de vues, Bonsecours, 2005 (ISBN 2-9516020-4-9)
