= Félix Archimède Pouchet =

French scientist

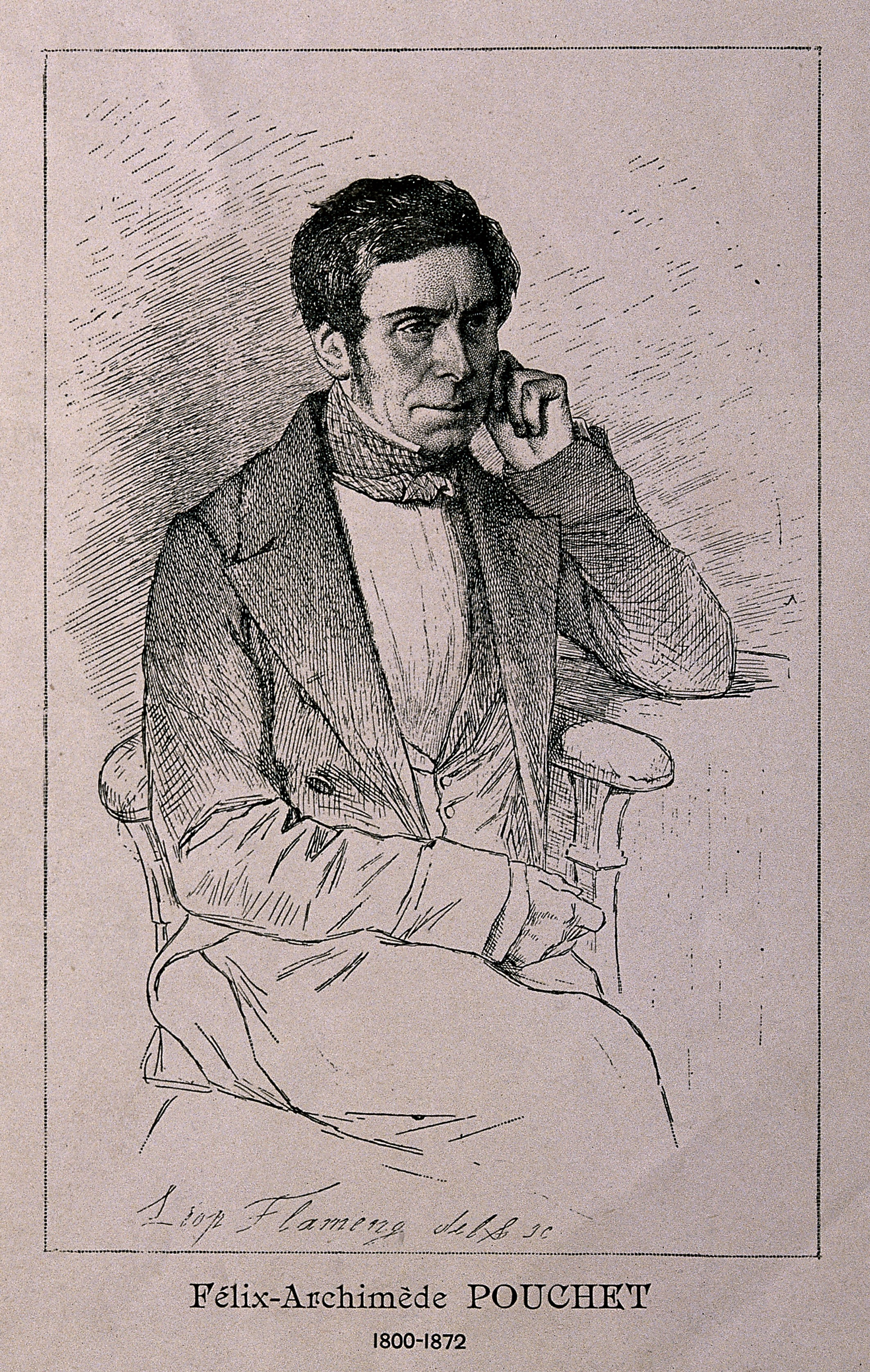
- Born: 26 August 1800; Rouen, France
- Died: 6 December 1872 (aged 72); Rouen, France
- Known for: Proponent of spontaneous generation
- Scientific career
- Fields: Natural history
- Workplaces: Rouen Museum of Natural History

Félix-Archimède Pouchet (26 August 1800 – 6 December 1872) was a French naturalist and a leading proponent of spontaneous generation of life from non-living materials, and as such an opponent of Louis Pasteur's germ theory. He was the father of Georges Pouchet (1833–1894), a professor of comparative anatomy.

From 1828 he was director of the Rouen Jardin des Plantes. Later, in 1838, he became professor at the School of Medicine at the University of Rouen. His major scientific work Hétérogénie was published in 1859. He also wrote a layperson's encyclopedia The Universe, published in 1870, which gives an overview of the sciences, but in which Pouchet ridicules Louis Pasteur's theories (calling them panspermism) and atomic theory.

In 1847, Pouchet effectively launched the study of the physiology of cytology. In 1848, he was elected as a member to the American Philosophical Society.

== Early career ==
Pouchet was born in Rouen, France, on August 26, 1800. His father was a respected manufacturer in Rouen. In 1827, Pouchet received his M.D. in Paris, and later became the director of the Rouen Museum of Natural History. He also held a chair at one of the local medical preparatory colleges in Rouen in the field of zoology, and in 1843, he received the Legion of Honour.

In 1830, botanists A.Rich. ex DC. published Pouchetia, a genus of flowering plants from Africa, belonging to the family Rubiaceae. It was named in Felix's honour.

Pouchet had extensive experience in the field of traditional biology before the debate, where his main interest was animal generation. In the 1840s, he published two scientific articles. Both publications seemed to contradict his eventual support of spontaneous generation. In these publications, he believed that in the animal kingdom, generation happened through eggs that existed before fertilization. He also demonstrated reservations in spontaneous generation by supporting the beliefs of Christian Ehrenberg. Ehrenberg believed that infusoria had complex organ systems while other protozoologists, like Fèlix Dujardin, believed that infusoria were simple organisms that could appear spontaneously. Pouchet did not seem very interested in spontaneous generation during this time, and instead studied ovule production and menstruation.

== Debate with Pasteur ==
Pouchet was 60 years old while Louis Pasteur was 37 years old when the heart of the debate about spontaneous generation began. Their opinions on generation originated from two competing theories. Pouchet believed in heterogenesis, which assumed that new living organisms came from inanimate objects, such as air. The parents of these new organisms were not the same species as the new organism. Pasteur supported the germ theory that said microorganisms arose from germs and those microorganisms came from parents of the same species. He supported the idea that germs were mostly everywhere, including things like air and those germs explained the appearance of microorganisms on different inanimate things.

It is unclear why Pouchet shifted his interest to spontaneous generation, but in December 1858, Pouchet presented results to the French Academy of Sciences of two experiments he conducted that he claimed supported the notion of spontaneous generation. He said that his results were the opposite of Theodore Schwann’s results that demonstrated spontaneous generation did not exist. Schwann observed that after heating oxygen in a vessel, which was thought to be important for spontaneous generation, no microorganisms grew. He said that this was a result of the germs in the oxygen or air being destroyed by the heat. Pouchet claimed that when he did Schwann's experiment, microorganisms did grow, and thus germs in the air did not produce microorganisms. His experiments did not receive a positive reaction from the academy. Most of them thought his experiments were conducted poorly and that he did not effectively control for the intrusion of germs.

The debate between the two men was not very public or intense at first. Pouchet received a letter from Pasteur in February 1859 that said that Pasteur respected his belief in spontaneous generation but did not agree with his evidence. Pasteur held the same belief of the academy and thought that Pouchet's experiments did not support spontaneous generation because his experiments were contaminated with germs.

Pouchet took the criticism from the academy and tried to revise his experiments. However, this time, Pasteur took a stronger and more specific stance about his new experiments. He critiqued the fact that Pouchet again did not control for germs and that his flasks were contaminated by the dust in the mercury that was in his lab.

Despite the criticism, Pouchet published his famous book Hétérogénie ou traité de la génération spontanée in 1859, which publicized his support of spontaneous generation. He claimed that his views of spontaneous generation were not like that of the older views of spontaneous generation that were labeled as atheistic, but were rather in agreement with the orthodox scientific and religious beliefs of the time. Pouchet claimed that it was the eggs of adult organisms that were spontaneously generated, not the adult organisms themselves.

On January 30, 1860, the French Academy of Sciences declared that it would give out a prize for detailed and precise experiments that expanded on the subject of spontaneous generation. Pasteur decided to partake in this competition to combat Pouchet's support of spontaneous generation. He designed an experiment to deny the notion of spontaneous generation. He thought that if spontaneous generation were true in which air itself could cause generation, then all sterile swan neck flasks that were later exposed to air would generate microorganisms. If the germ theory were true, then he believed some of the sterile swan neck flasks would generate microorganisms when exposed to air and some would not because germs are distributed unevenly in air.

Pasteur's results supported the germ theory and he showed them to the French Academy of Sciences. Pouchet rejected Pasteur's results because he thought that the atmosphere did not have enough germs to support these results; therefore, the microorganisms that were generated in his vessels were still not from germs.

The French Academy of Sciences viewed Pasteur's experiments and observations as sophisticated and viewed Pouchet's experiments as ambiguous and unrefined. Along with this and due to the religious climate of this time, Pasteur had an advantage because his view that only life produces life was aligned with the views of the church. Pouchet eventually dropped out of the competition in November 1862 and Pasteur was awarded for his studies on spontaneous generation.

== Scientific works ==
Pouchet published, in the Positive Theory of Spontaneous Ovulation and Fertilization of Mammals and the Human Species, ten fundamental principles of ovulation, menstruation, and fertilization between humans and other mammals.

1. The human species and mammiferae are subjected to the same fundamental laws.

2. Throughout the animal kingdom, generation is effected by means of ova which exist previous to fecundation (fertilization).

3. Many obstacles oppose the possibility of contact between the seminal fluid and ovules contained in the Graafian follicles.

4. Fecundation can only take place when the ovum has acquired a certain degree of development after its separation from the ovary.

5. Throughout the animal series, it is incontestable that the ovary discharges its ovules independently of fecundation.

6. In all animals ovules are emitted at fixed epochs, in relation with the periodical surexcitation of the genital organs.

7. In the human species, and the mammiferae, fecundation never occurs, except when the emission of ovules coincides with the presence of seminal fluid.

8. The menstruation of woman corresponds to the phenomena of excitement, which is manifested at the rutting seasions in various animals, and especially in the females of mammiferae.

9. Fecundation is in constant relation with menstruation; therefore in the human species it is easy to rigorously establish the intermenstrual epoch at which conception is physically impossible.

10. In the human species and mammiferae, the ovule and the sperm normally encounter each other in the uterus and the neighboring region of the Fallopian tubes, and it is here that fecundation takes place.

== History of science in the Middle Ages ==
Pouchet also wrote a history of science during the Middle Ages, which he titled Histoire des sciences naturelles au moyen age, ou Albert le Grand et son epoque considere comme point de depart de I'ecole experimentale. As the subtitle makes clear, the work centres on Albertus Magnus, the 13th-century Dominican friar who was famous for his work on botany and astrology. In the work, Pouchet divides the history of Western science into three epochs: Greek, Roman and Christian. This was part of a general rewriting of Western intellectual history to mythologise it as a single inevitable progress towards the modern age. Pouchet also wrote a work titled L'univers: les infiniment grands et les infiniment petits, which detailed the richness of the earth's life forms within the context of the divine universe as a whole.
