= John Farley (historian) =

Canadian historian of science

John Farley, born in Leicester on April 23, 1936, and died on November 10, 2015, was a Canadian science historian, author of several works and articles on the history of medicine. His work has had an influence on the sociology of scientific knowledge.

In a 1999 article and a 2003 book, D. Raynaud concludes that the apology for Félix Pouchet presented by Farley and Gerald L. Geison in their 1974 article on the controversy between Pouchet and Pasteur is futile.

== Publications ==
- J. Farley et G. Geison, "Science, Politics, and Spontaneous Generation in Nineteenth-Century France : The Pasteur-Pouchet Debate", Bulletin of the History of Medicine, t. 48 (1974), p. 161–198.
- The spontaneous generation controversy from Descartes to Oparin, Baltimore, Johns Hopkins University Press, 1977.
- Gametes & spores : ideas about sexual reproduction, 1750-1914, Baltimore, Johns Hopkins University Press, 1982.
- Bilharzia : a history of imperial tropical medicine, Cambridge; New York, Cambridge University Press, 1991.
- To cast out disease : a history of the International Health Division of the Rockefeller Foundation (1913-1951), Oxford; New York : Oxford University Press, 2004.
- John Farley and Gerald L. Geison, "Le débat entre Pateur et Pouchet: science, politique et génération spontanée au XIXe siècle en France", in Michel Callon et Bruno Latour, La science telle qu'elle se fait. Anthologie de la sociologie des sciences de langue anglaise, Éditions de La Découverte, 1991, p. 87–146. (French translation of the 1974 article.)
