= Generation of Animals =

Work by Aristotle

The Generation of Animals (or On the Generation of Animals; Greek: Περὶ ζῴων γενέσεως (Peri Zoion Geneseos); Latin: De Generatione Animalium) is one of the biological works of the Corpus Aristotelicum, the collection of texts traditionally attributed to Aristotle (384–322 BC). The work provides an account of animal reproduction, gestation, heredity, and embryology.

== Content ==
Generation of Animals consists of five books, which are themselves split into varying numbers of chapters. Most editions of this work categorise it with Bekker numbers. In general, each book covers a range of related topics, however there is also a significant amount of overlap in the content of the books. For example, while one of the two principal topics covered in book I is the function of semen (gone, sperma), this account is not finalised until partway through book II.

Book I (715a – 731b)

Chapter 1 begins with Aristotle claiming to have already addressed the parts of animals, referencing the author's work of the same name. While this and possibly his other biological works, have addressed three of the four causes pertaining to animals, the final, formal, and material, the efficient cause has yet to be spoken of. He argues that the efficient cause, or "that from which the source of movement comes" can be addressed with an inquiry into the generation of animals. Aristotle then provides a general overview of the processes of reproduction adopted by the various genera, for instance most 'blooded' animals reproduce by coition of a male and female of the same species, but cases vary for 'bloodless' animals.

The reproductive organs of males and females are also investigated. Through chapters 2–5 Aristotle successively describes the general reproductive features common to each sex, the differences in reproductive parts among blooded animals, the causes of differences of testes in particular, and why some animals do not have external reproductive organs. The latter provides clear examples of Aristotle's teleological approach to causation, as it is applied to biology. He argues that the male hedgehog has its testes near its loin, unlike the majority of vivipara, because due to their spines hedgehogs mate standing upright. The hedgehog's form is that of an animal able to use its spines for self-defence, and so its reproductive organs are situated in such a way as to complement this.

Chapter 6 describes why fish and serpents copulate in a short space of time, and chapter 7 provides an explanation for why serpents intertwine during coition. Chapters 8–11 focus on female reproductive organs, and in particular the differences in viviparous and oviparous production of young, and the differing states of the eggs produced by ovipara. This is continued in chapters 12 and 13, where Aristotle discusses the reasons the uterus is internal and the testes external, and their locations among various species. Concluding this section on the reproductive parts of animals is an overview from chapters 14–16 of the generative faculties of crustacea, cephalopods, and insects. This section contains an admission of an observational uncertainty, with Aristote stating that observations of insect coition are not yet detailed enough to classify into types.

The remainder of Book I (chapters 17 – 23) is concerned with providing an account of semen and its contribution to the generative process. The primary conclusions reached in this section are, firstly, that semen is not a bodily waste product, but "a residue of useful nutriment", and that because the bodily emissions produced by females during copulation are not of a similar nutritive character, semen must be the efficient cause of offspring.

Book II (731b – 749a)

Chapters 1–3 of Book II continue the discussion of semen from the end of Book I. As a result of questioning potential ways in which the particular parts of animals might come to be formed, such as semen containing small versions of the bodily organs, before settling on the idea that semen contributes the potential (dunamis) for the parts to come into being as they are. This is the basis for the imparting of the soul upon the material substratum present in the egg, as the female reproductive residue itself contains no active principle for the motion required to form an embryo. Aristotle's conception of the soul should not be mistaken for one which takes the soul to be a non-physical substance separate to the body. It instead comprises the ability for some function to be performed, which in the case of bodily development means the ability for organs to perform their bodily functions. Scholar Devin Henry describes Aristotle's view as follows:

"Aristotelian souls are not the sorts of things that are capable of being implanted in bodily organs from without (except perhaps intellectual soul). Soul is not an extra ingredient added to the organ over-and-above its structure. Once there is a properly constructed organ it straightaway possess the corresponding soul-function in virtue of its structure."

The generative capacity of semen in imparting the soul is its heat, with semen itself being "a compound of breath and water". It is the component of breath (pneuma) that shapes the material provided by the female into the correct form.

The mechanics of the development of the embryo take up much of chapters 4–7, with Aristotle addressing first the different stages of development at which vivipara and ovipara expel their young. In chapter 5 the theory of soul-imparting is amended slightly, as observations of wind-eggs show that the female, unassisted, is able to impart the nutritive aspect of the soul, which Aristotle claims is its lowest portion. Chapter 6 addresses the order in which the parts of an embryo come about, and in chapter 7 Aristotle argues that, contrary to what Democritus apparently thought, that "children are nourished in the uterus by sucking some lump of flesh", in actuality unborn vivipara are nourished by the umbilical cord. Chapter 8 discusses cross-breeding of species, and the sterility of mules.

Book III (749a – 763b)

Book III covers non-viviparous embryonic development. The first four chapters provide a description and explanation of eggs, while in chapters 5–7 Aristotle responds to other ideas about eggs and some observational difficulties in providing an empirical account of all eggs. The final chapters cover the development of hitherto unmentioned animals.

Chapter 1 is on the subject of bird eggs, with Aristotle providing explanations for why different birds produce different amounts of eggs, why some birds produce wind-eggs, and why bird eggs are sometimes of two colours. Following an explication of the formation of eggs and how they provide nutrition for the embryo in chapter 2, in chapter 3 Aristotle compares the eggs of birds against those of fish. The descriptive account of eggs is completed in chapter 4, which describes the growth of some eggs after they have been laid.

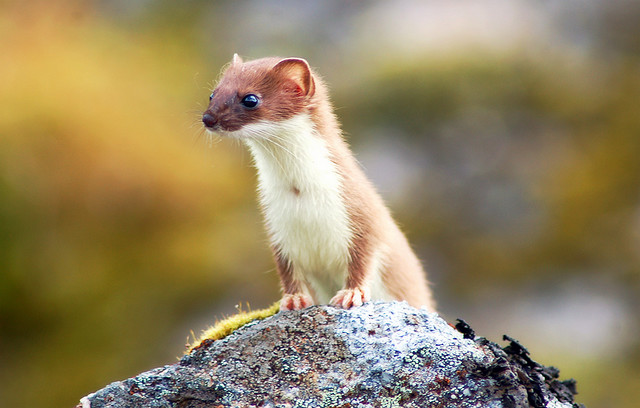
A least weasel.

Chapters 5 and 6 are a response to what Aristotle takes to be falsely-held beliefs of other scientists concerning the process of procreation. For example, Anaxagoras apparently held that weasels give birth from their mouths because "the young of the weasel are very small like those of the other fissipeds, of which we shall speak later, and because they often carry the young about in their mouths. Aristotle states instead that weasels have the same uteruses as other quadrupeds, and there is nothing to connect the uterus to the mouth, so such a claim as Anaxagoras' must be unfounded.

Chapters 7–10 cover the generative processes of selachians, cephalopods, crustacea, insects and bees, in successive order. Chapter 11 concerns the generation of testacea, which are said to generate spontaneously. While it is possible for some of the Testacea, such as mussels, to emit a liquid slime which can form others of the same kind, they are also formed "in connexion with putrefaction and admixture of rain-water."

Book IV (763b – 778a)

Book IV is primarily on the topic of biological inheritance. Aristotle is concerned with both the similarities between the offspring and parents and the differences that can arise within a particular species as a result of the generative process. Chapters 1 is an account of the origin of the sexes. Aristotle considers the sexes to be "the first principles of all living things". Given this, the sex of an embryo is determined entirely by the potency of the fertilising semen, which contains the male principle. If this semen lacks heat in fashioning the material present in the female then the male principle cannot take hold, and therefore its opposite principle must take hold. In chapter two Aristotle provides pieces of observational evidence for this, including the following:

"Again, more males are born if copulation takes place when north than when south winds are blowing; for animals' bodies are more liquid when the wind is in the south, so that they produce more residue – and more residue is harder to concoct; hence the semen of the males is more liquid and so is the discharge of the menstrual fluids in women."

In chapter 3 Aristotle provides the primary elements of his theory of inheritance and resemblances. Utilising the account of the function of semen from Book II Aristotle describes how the movement of semen upon the proto-embryonic material gives rise to particular traits inherited from one's ancestors. Semen contains the general male principle, and contains in addition that of the particular male whose semen it is, so Socrates' semen will contain his particular genetic traits. In fashioning the material the semen imparts, or does not impart, genetic traits in the same way as the determination of sex, where a resemblance to the father will be imparted onto the material if the semen is of a suitable temperature, provided the male principle has established the sex as male. If instead the male principle was hot enough to be imparted but not that of the particular male, Socrates, was not then the movement may either put forth a resemblance to the mother, or it could relapse into that of the father of the father or some other non-immediate ancestor.

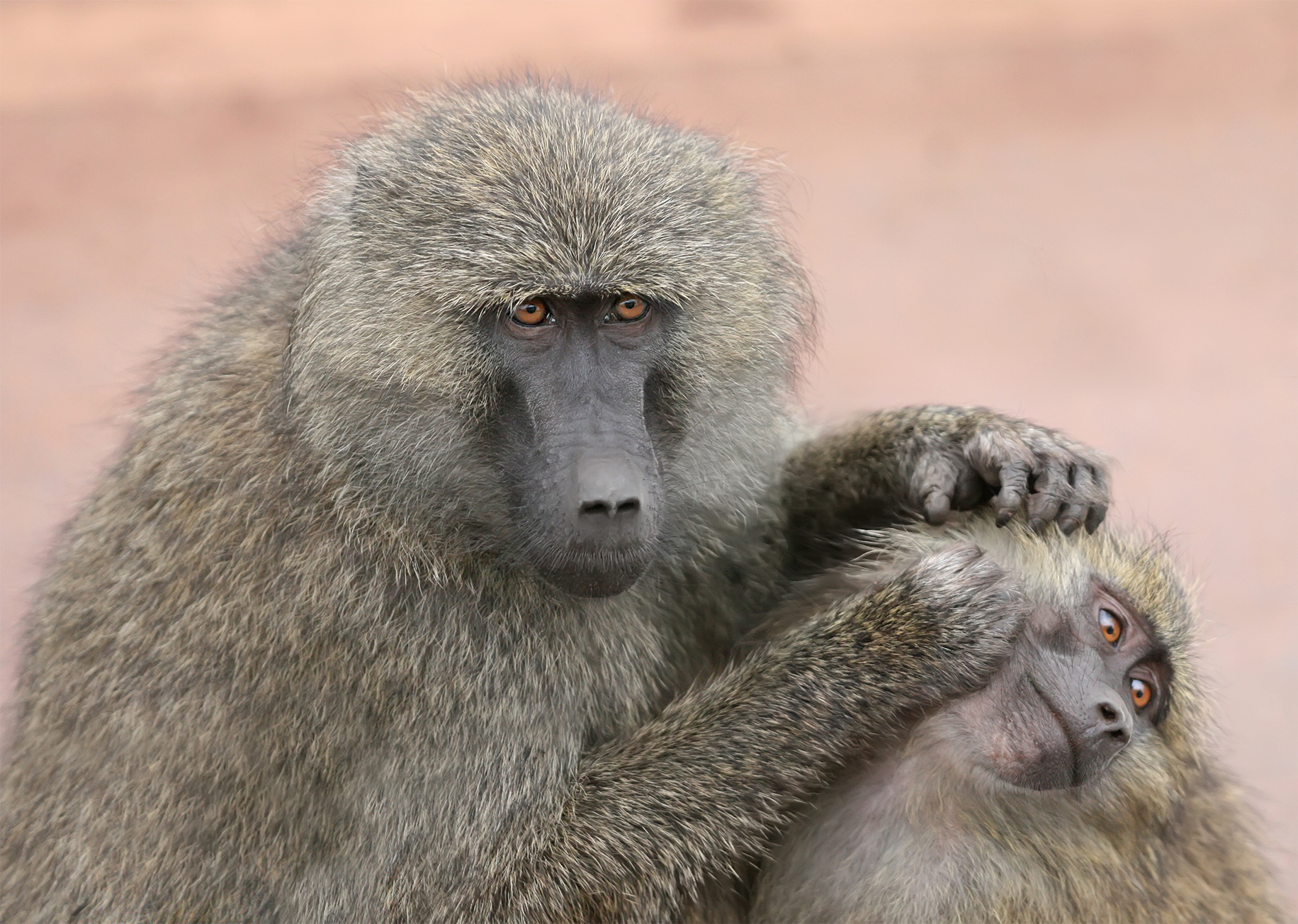
An olive baboon grooming the hair of another.

Chapter 4 develops this theory for the cases of deformities, and why different animals produce different amounts of offspring. The former is due to malformed reproductive material present in the female, and for the latter it is particular relations of the size of the animal, the moisture of reproductive materials, and the heat of semen. Chapter 5 presents the causes of superfetation, which is an inadequate separation of multiple young during gestation. Chapters 6 and 7 focus on the causes of other birth defects, and why males are allegedly more likely to suffer from defects. Chapters 8–10 concern the production of milk, why animals are born headfirst, and on the length of gestation being proportional to the length of life, respectively.

Book V (778a – 789b)

Aristotle takes Book V to be an investigation of "the qualities by which the parts of animals differ." The subjects addressed by this book are a miscellaneous range of animal parts, such as eye colour (chapter 1), body hair (chapter 3) and the pitch of the voice (chapter 7). The apparent lack of a single causal scheme or subject matter for these discrete topics has led to disagreement in how this book relates to the rest of the Generation of Animals. Some scholars take the Book only to be concerned only with material causes of intra-species differences that arise later in development, in contrast with the earlier books' systematic use of teleology. Others have suggested that Book V does utilise causation other than material to a considerable extent.
