= Gooseneck (piping) =

Pipe fitting

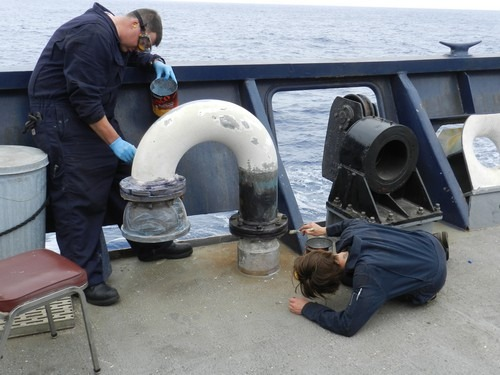
Gooseneck vent with check valve being repainted.

A gooseneck (or goose neck) is a 180° pipe fitting at the top of a vertical pipe that prevents entry of water. Common implementations of goosenecks are ventilator piping or ducting for bathroom and kitchen exhaust fans, ship holds, landfill methane vent pipes, or any other piping implementation exposed to the weather where water ingress would be undesired. It is so named because the word comes from the similarity of pipe fitting to the bend in a goose's neck.

Gooseneck may also refer to a style of kitchen or bathroom faucet with a long vertical pipe terminating in a 180° bend.

To avoid hydrocarbon accumulation, a thermosiphon should be installed at the low point of the gooseneck.

Leaded goosenecks are short sections of lead pipe (1’ to 2’ long) used during the early 1900s up to World War Two in supplying water to a customer. These lead tubes could be easily bent, and allowed for a flexible connection between rigid service piping. The bent segments of pipe often took the shape of a goose's neck, and are referred to as “lead goosenecks.” Lead is no longer permitted in new water systems or new building construction.

Goosenecks (also referred to as pigtails) are in-line components of a water service (i.e. piping, valves, fittings, tubing, and accessories) running from the distribution system water main to a meter or building inlet. The valve used to connect a small-diameter service line to a water main is called a corporation stop (also called a tap, or corp stop). One gooseneck joins the corporation stop to the water service pipe work. A second gooseneck links the supply pipeline to a water meter located outside the building.

== See also ==
- Swan neck duct
- Swan neck flask
- Trap (plumbing)
