= Swan neck duct =

A swan neck duct is a jet engine component, usually situated within the compression or turbine expansion system.

Many jet engines have a short annular passageway, linking two components, where there is a large change in mean radius, from front to rear. The shape of the resulting passageway is often similar to that of a swan or goose neck. Consequently, such a passageway is called a swan (or goose) neck duct. The duct provides a continuous matching of the flows between the high pressure and low pressure turbines and a diffusion of the flow upstream of the low pressure turbine. For the latter purpose a swan neck duct is an example of an inter-turbine diffuser.

== See also ==
- Gooseneck (piping)
