= Microscopical researches into the accordance in the structure and growth of animals and plants =

1839 treatise by Theodor Schwann

Microscopical researches into the accordance in the structure and growth of animals and plants is a famous treatise by Theodor Schwann published in 1839 which officially formulated the basis of the cell theory. The original title was Mikroskopische Untersuchungen über die Uebereinstimmung in der Struktur und dem Wachsthum der Thiere und Pflanzen. The book has been called "a conspicuous milestone in nineteenth century biology" by Karl Sudhoff and "epoch making" By Francis Münzer.

The book, originally published in German, was translated to English in 1847 by Henry Spencer Smith in an edition that also contained the treatise Phytogenesis, by Matthias Schleiden.

Besides the theoretical work, that Schwann called a "philosophical" section of general anatomy, Schwann provided several plates with drawings of cells and tissues and discussions of observations of other microscopists.

== Cell theory ==
Schwann dedicated a chapter of the treatise to explicitly formulate the cell theory, stating that ("the elementary parts of all tissues are formed of cells” and that “there is one universal principle of development for the elementary parts of organisms... and this principle is in the formation of cells" (Henry Smith's translation, 1847). His book had the goal to prove via observations that the cell theory put forth for plants by Matthias Schleiden was equally valid for animals.

== Schwann cell ==
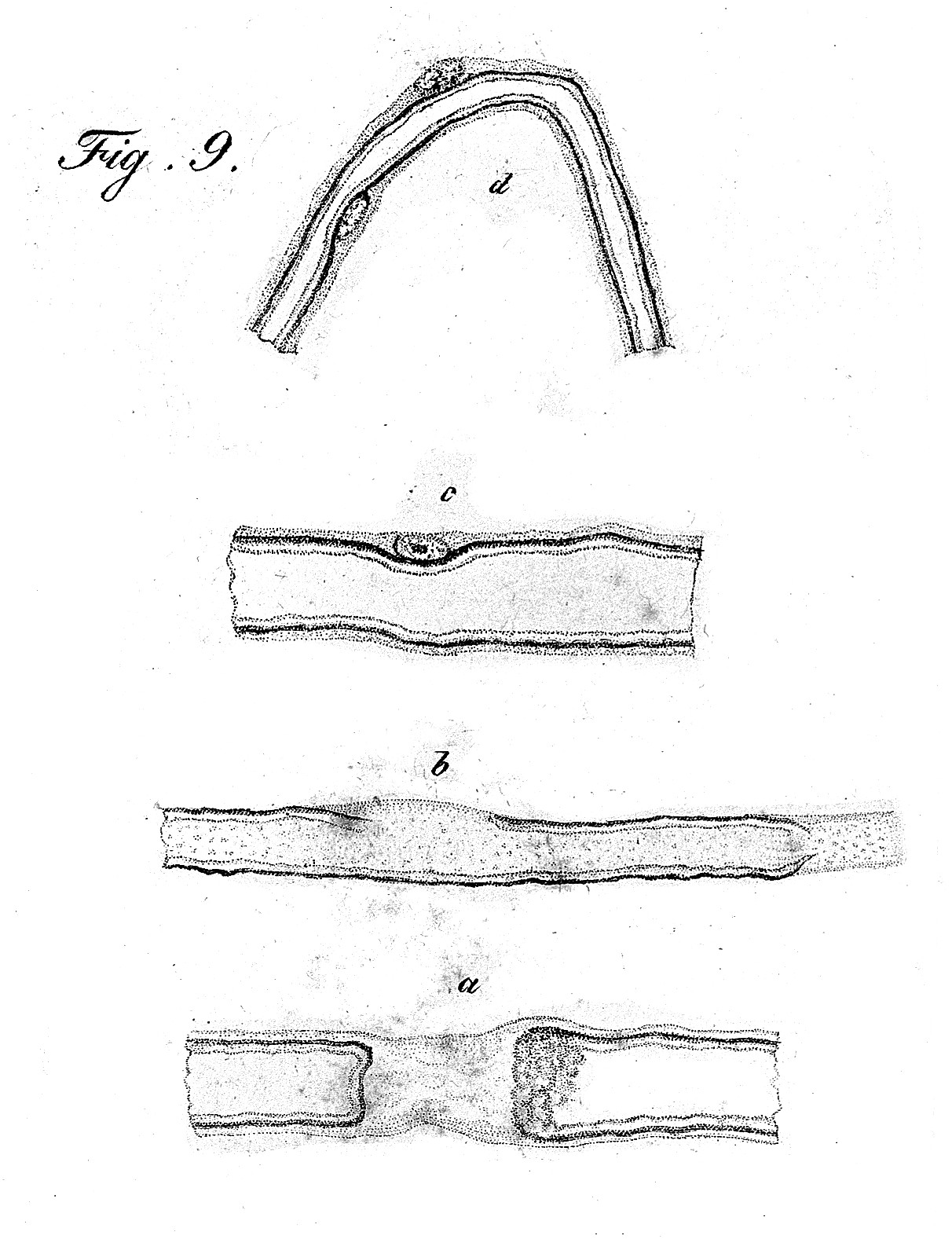
Plate 4, Figure 9 from the book, showing drawings of what are now called Schwann cells in the vagus nerve of a calf.

The book is credited with the first description of what would later be called Schwann cell, a type of glial cell. The description of the cells was evident from passages such as:

Some, however, appear to remain for a longer period; occasionally, although rarely, a cell-nucleui is here and there seen upon the side of a nerve (the white substance of which is completely developed), lying in the pale border, which surrounds the white substance. Fig. 9, c and d, exhibits them from the nervus vagus of a calf.

— Theodor Schwann, Microscopical researches (trans. by Henry Smith, 1847)

and

Pl. 4, fig. 6 represents a portion of the ischiatic, and fig.7, of the brachial nerve of such a foetus. We observe a palish, and very minutely-granulated cord, which, in consequence of certain longitudinal shadings, such as the delineation exhibits, presents the appearance of a coarse fibrous structure. Round or for the most part oval corpuscles, which are immediately recognized as cell-nuclei, and which sometimes also contain one or two nucleoli, are generally seen in the course of these shaded parts, throughout the entire thickness of the cord.

— Theodor Schwann, Microscopical researches (trans. by Henry Smith, 1847)

== Metabolism ==
The book is also credited with the introduction of the term "metabolism" for the following quote in the chapter "Theory of Cells":

The question, then, as to the fundamental power of organised bodies resolves itself into that of the fundamental powers of the individual cells.”… These phenomena may be arranged in two natural groups: first, those which relate to the combination of molecules to form a cell; secondly, those which result from chemical changes either in the component particles of the cell itself or in the surrounding cytoblastema, and may be called metabolic phenomena (implying that which is liable to occasion or suffer change)

— Theodor Schwann, Microscopical researches (trans. by Henry Smith, 1847)
