= Testacea =

Testacea may refer to:

- a former order of rhizopods, which consisted of testate amoeboid organisms.
- a former group of shelled molluscs and other invertebrates, created by Linnaeus and roughly corresponding to the colloquial term seashell (see Vermes).
- a species group of Drosophila in the Drosophila subgenus.
