= Charles Cagniard de la Tour =

French engineer and physicist (1777–1859)

Baron Charles Cagniard de la Tour (31 March 1777 – 5 July 1859) was a French engineer and physicist.

== Life ==
Charles Cagniard was born in Paris, and after attending the École Polytechnique became one of the ingénieurs géographiques. He examined the mechanism of voice-production, invented a blowing machine and contributed to quantitative acoustics by inventing an improved siren. He also studied yeast.

In 1822, he discovered the critical point of a substance in his gun barrel experiments. He sealed a flint ball in a sealed gun barrel filled with fluids at various temperatures, and rotated it to hear the splashing sound as it hit the liquid surface. He observed that above a certain temperature, there is no splashing sound. Above this temperature, the densities of the liquid and gas phases become equal and the distinction between them disappears, resulting in a single supercritical fluid phase. After this discovery, he performed quantitative measurements of the critical point of several substances such as water, alcohol, ether and carbon bisulphide.

He was made a baron in 1818, and died in Paris. Despite several claims to the contrary, no portraits of Baron Cagniard de la Tour exist.

== Research ==
=== Acoustics ===
In the process of creating a standard for the measurement of the loudness of sounds he created the Sirène de Caginard-Latour. A siren powered by a crank whose pitch could be changed by speeding up the rotation to increase pitch or slowing down to decrease pitch. This allowed precise control of the pitch produced. He used this siren to study the propegation of sound through liquids.

He was also interested in the Natural Frequency of Piano wire. In the Journal de chimie médicale (1833) he stated that the natural frequency was not modified by Work Hardening or Quenching. These claims were later disproved by Wertheim and Victor Regnault (1847).

=== Other Work ===
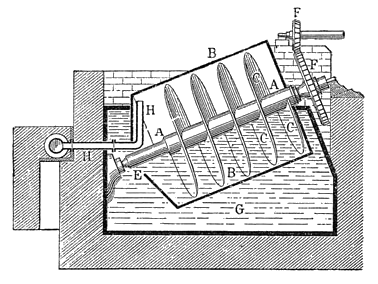
cagniardelle

He was the author of numerous inventions, including the cagniardelle, a blowing machine, which consists essentially of an Archimedean screw set obliquely in a tank of water in such a way that its lower end is completely and its upper end partially immersed, and operated by being rotated in the opposite direction to that required for raising water. This device has been instrumental in improving the quality of cast-iron, as it enabled a continuous supply of air into the furnace.

In 1810, he produced an early form of lucifer or friction match, the "phosphorus bottle". This used a sulfur-infused taper to extract partially oxidized phosphorus from a vial, which then produced a flame when struck against any firm surface.

In course of an investigation in 1822–1823 on the effects of heat and pressure on certain liquids he found that for each there was a certain temperature above which it refused to remain liquid but passed into the gaseous state, no matter what the amount of pressure to which it was subjected, and in the case of water he determined this critical temperature to be 362 °C (modern figure is 373.946 °C). He also studied the nature of yeast and the influence of extreme cold upon its life.
