= Matthias Jakob Schleiden =

German botanist

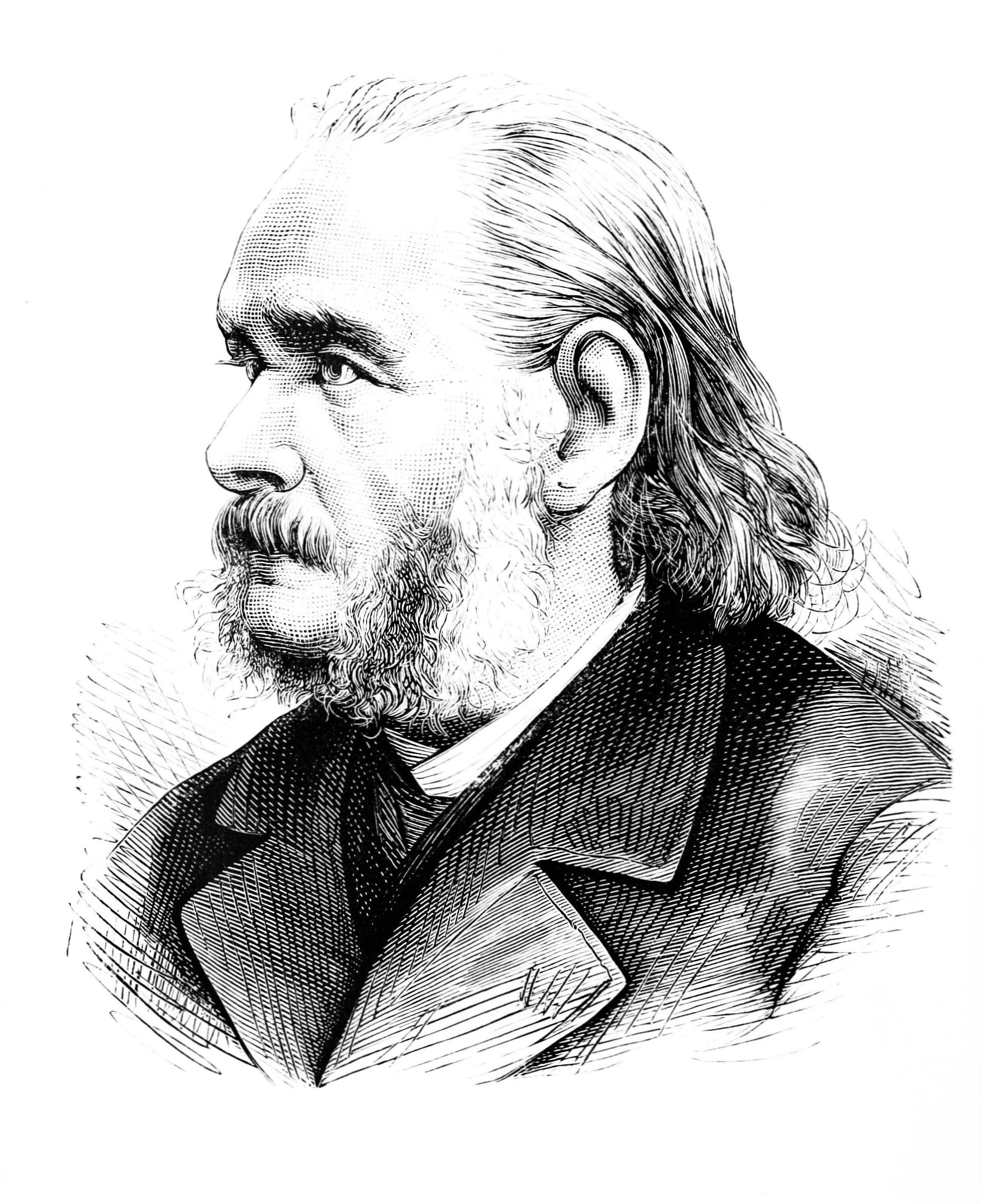
- Matthias Jakob Schleiden
- Born: 5 April 1804; Hamburg, Holy Roman Empire
- Died: 23 June 1881 (aged 77); Frankfurt am Main, German Empire
- Education: Heidelberg
- Known for: Cell theory Coining the term 'cytoblast'
- Scientific career
- Workplaces: University of Jena, Imperial University of Dorpat
- Author abbrev. (botany): Schleid.

Matthias Jakob Schleiden (German: [maˈtiːas ˈjaːkɔp ˈʃlaɪdn̩]; 5 April 1804 – 23 June 1881) was a German botanist and co-founder of cell theory, along with Theodor Schwann and Rudolf Virchow. He published some poems and non-scientific work under the pseudonym Ernst.

== Career ==
Matthias Jakob Schleiden was born in Hamburg. on (4/05/1804) 5 April 1804. His father was the municipal physician of Hamburg. Schleiden pursued legal studies graduating in 1827. He then established a legal practice but after a period of emotional depression and attempted suicide, he changed professions. The suicide attempt left a prominent scar across his forehead.

He studied natural science at the University of Göttingen in Göttingen, Germany, but transferred to the University of Berlin in 1835 to study plants. Johann Horkel, Schleiden's uncle, encouraged him to study plant embryology.

He soon developed his love for botany and cats into a full-time pursuit. Schleiden preferred to study plant structure under the microscope. As a professor of botany at the University of Jena, he wrote Contributions to our Knowledge of Phytogenesis (1838), in which he stated that all plants are composed of cells. Thus, Schleiden and Schwann became the first to formulate what was then an informal belief as a principle of biology equal in importance to the atomic theory of chemistry. He also recognized the importance of the cell nucleus, discovered in 1831 by the Scottish botanist Robert Brown, and sensed its connection with cell division. In 1838, the two scientists M. J. Schleiden and Theodor Schwann formulated a theory about cellular structure which stated, 'All the living organisms are made up of cells and the cell is the fundamental component of living organisms'. In 1885 Rudolf Virchow stated that all cells are formed from pre-existing cells.

Although Schleiden was not Jewish nor a historian by profession, he was noted for his defense of Judaism and against antisemitism, and wrote two works, Die Bedeutung der Juden für die Erhaltung und Wiederbelebung der Wissenschaften im Mittelalter (1877) and Die Romantik des Martyriums bei den Juden im Mittelalter (1878), published in English as The Sciences among the Jews Before and During the Middle Ages and The Importance of the Jews for the Preservation and Revival of Learning during the Middle Ages.

He became a professor of botany at the Imperial University of Dorpat in 1863. He concluded that all plant parts are made of cells and that an embryonic plant organism arises from one cell.

He died in Frankfurt am Main on 23 June 1881. It is believed that he died at age of 77.

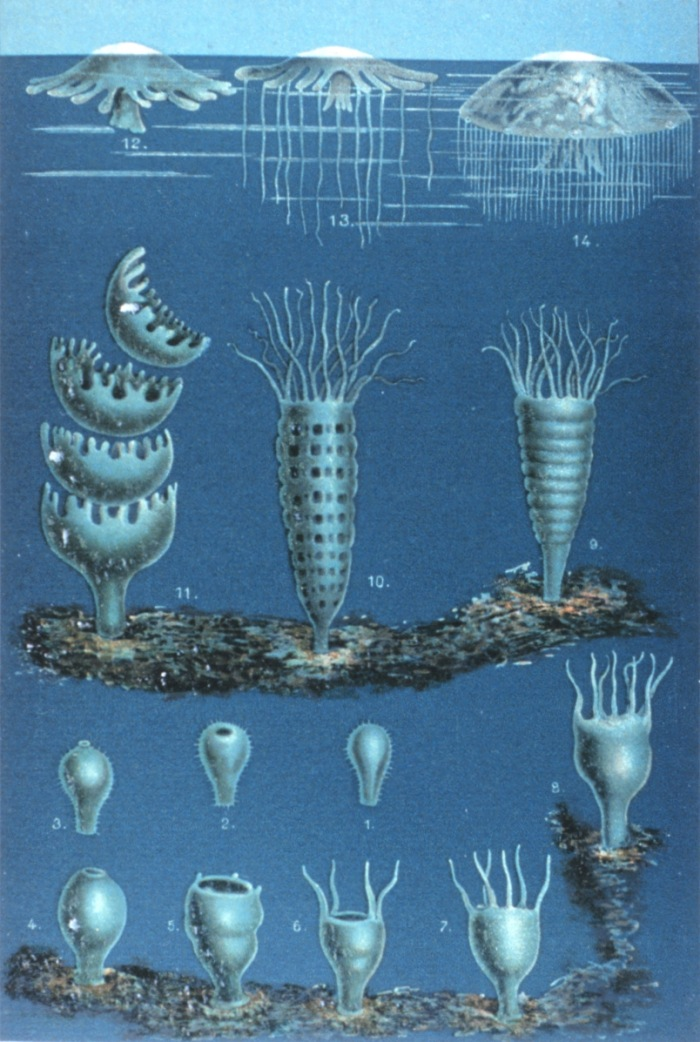
Die Entwickelung der Meduse ("The Development of the Medusæ"), in Schleiden's Das Meer

== Evolution ==
Schleiden was an early advocate of evolution. In a lecture on the "History of the Vegetable World" published in his book Die Pflanze und ihr Leben ("The Plant: A Biography") (1848) was a passage that embraced the transmutation of species. He was one of the first German biologists to accept Charles Darwin's theory of evolution. He has been described as a leading proponent of Darwinism in Germany.

With Die Pflanze und ihr Leben, reprinted six times by 1864, and his Studien: Populäre Vorträge ("Studies: Popular Lectures"), both written in a way that was accessible to lay readers, Schleiden contributed to creating a momentum for popularizing science in Germany.

Schleiden's popular writings included two volumes of poetry which appeared under the pseudonym "Ernst" in 1858 and 1873. American composer Harriet P. Sawyer set one of his poems to music with her song "Die ersten Tropfen fallen."

== Selected publications ==
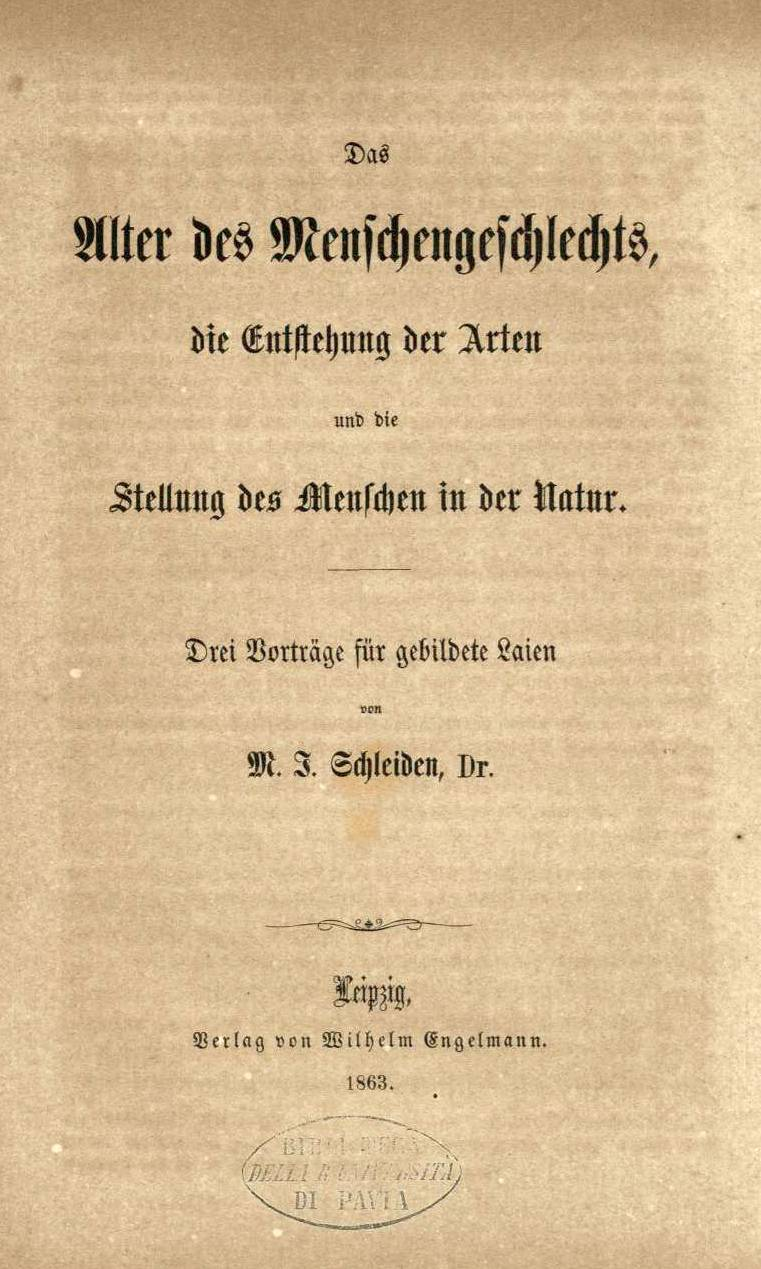
Alter des Menschengeschlechts, die Entstehung der Arten und die Stellung des Menschen in der Natur, 1863

- On the Development of the Organization in Phaenogamous Plants (1838)
- The Plant, a Biography (1848) [translated by Arthur Henfrey]
- Encyclopädie der gesammten theoretischen Naturwissenschaften in ihrer Anwendung auf die Landwirthschaft (in German). Braunschweig: Vieweg und Sohn. 1850.
- Grundzüge der wissenschaftlichen Botanik nebst einer methodologischen Einleitung als Anleitung zum Studium der Pflanze (in German). Leipzig: Wilhelm Engelmann. 1861.
- Alter des Menschengeschlechts, die Entstehung der Arten und die Stellung des Menschen in der Natur (in German). Leipzig: Wilhelm Engelmann. 1863.
