= Theodor Schwann =

German physiologist (1810–1882)

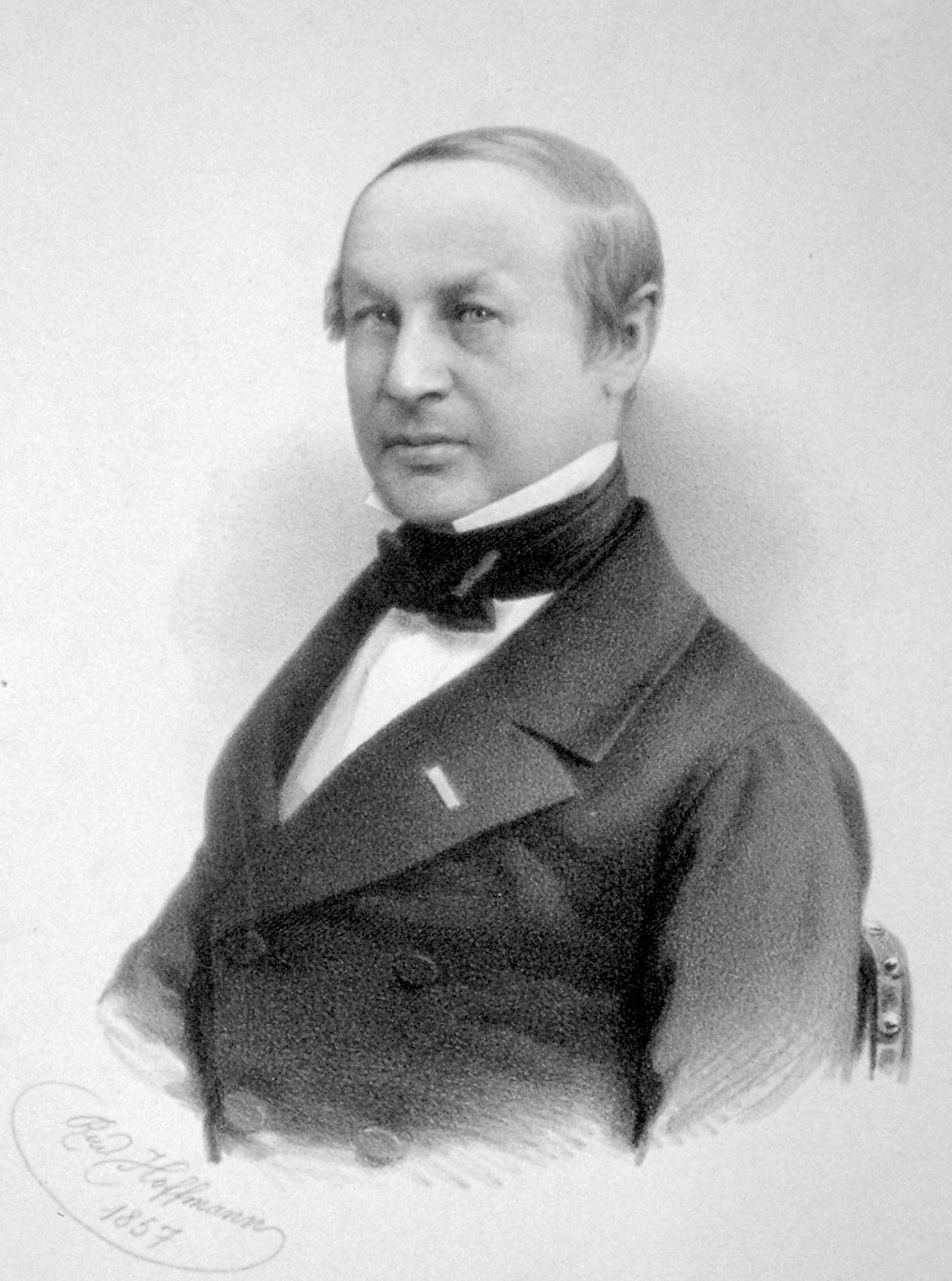
- Schwann in 1857
- Born: 7 December 1810; Neuss, First French Empire
- Died: 11 January 1882 (aged 71); Cologne, German Empire
- Education: Humboldt University of Berlin (1834); University of Bonn; University of Würzburg
- Known for: Cell theory; Schwann cells; Pepsin
- Awards: Copley Medal (1845)
- Scientific career
- Fields: Biology
- Workplaces: University of Berlin, Université Catholique de Louvain in Leuven, University of Liège

Theodor Schwann (German pronunciation: [ˈteːodoːɐ̯ ˈʃvan]; 7 December 1810 – 11 January 1882) was a German medical doctor and physiologist. His most significant contribution to biology is considered to be the extension of cell theory to animals. Other contributions include the discovery of Schwann cells in the peripheral nervous system, the discovery and study of pepsin, the discovery of the organic nature of yeast, and the invention of the term "metabolism".

== Early life and education ==
Theodor Schwann was born in Neuss on 7 December 1810 to Leonard Schwann and Elisabeth Rottels. Leonard Schwann was a goldsmith and later a printer. Theodor Schwann studied at the Dreikönigsgymnasium (also known as the Tricoronatum or Three Kings School), a Jesuit school in Cologne. Schwann was a devout Roman Catholic. In Cologne his religious instructor Wilhelm Smets, a priest and novelist, emphasized the individuality of the human soul and the importance of free will.

In 1829, Schwann enrolled at the University of Bonn in the premedical curriculum. He received a bachelor of philosophy in 1831. While at Bonn, Schwann met and worked with physiologist Johannes Peter Müller. Müller is considered to have founded scientific medicine in Germany, publishing his Handbuch der Physiologie des Menschen für Vorlesungen in 1837–1840. It was translated into English as Elements of Physiology in 1837–1843 and became the leading physiology textbook of the 1800s.

In 1831, Schwann moved to the University of Würzburg for clinical training in medicine. In 1833, he went to the University of Berlin, where Müller was now Professor of Anatomy and Physiology. Schwann graduated with an M.D. degree in medicine from the University of Berlin in 1834. He did his thesis work in 1833–1834, with Müller as his advisor. Schwann's thesis involved a careful study of the necessity for oxygen during the embryonic development of the chicken. To carry it out, he designed and built an apparatus that enabled him to pump the gases oxygen and hydrogen out of the incubation chamber at specific times. This enabled him to establish the critical period in which the eggs needed oxygen.

Schwann passed the state examination to practice medicine in the summer of 1834, but he chose to continue to work with Müller, doing research rather than practicing medicine. He could afford to do so, at least in the short term, because of a family inheritance. His salary as an assistant was only 120 taler. For the next five years, Schwann would pay the other three-quarters of his expenses out of his inheritance. As a long-term strategy, it was not sustainable.

== Career ==
From 1834 to 1839, Schwann worked as an assistant to Müller in at the Anatomisch-zootomische Museum at the University of Berlin. Schwann carried out a series of microscopic and physiological experiments focused on studying the structure and function of nerves, muscles and blood vessels. In addition to performing experiments in preparation for Müller's book on physiology, Schwann did research of his own. Many of his important contributions were made during the time that he worked with Müller in Berlin.

Schwann used newly powerful microscopes to examine animal tissues. This enabled him to observe animal cells and note their different properties. His work complemented that of Matthias Jakob Schleiden in plants and was informed by it; the two were close friends.

Described as quiet and serious, Schwann was particularly gifted in the construction and use of apparatus for his experiments. He was also able to identify important scientific questions and design experiments to systematically test them. His writing has been described as accessible, and his logic as a "clear progression". He identified the question that he wanted to answer and communicated the importance of his findings effectively to others. His co-worker Jakob Henle spoke of him as having an "inborn drive" to experiment.

By 1838, Schwann needed a position with a more substantial salary. He hoped to return to Bonn, a Catholic city. He attempted to gain a professorship there in 1838 and again in 1846, but was disappointed. Instead, in 1839, Schwann accepted the chair of anatomy at the Université Catholique de Louvain in Leuven, Belgium, another Catholic city.

Schwann proved to be a dedicated and conscientious professor. With his new teaching duties, he had less time for new scientific work. He spent considerable time perfecting experimental techniques and instruments for use in experiments. He produced few papers. One exception was a paper in 1844 that reported on a series of experiments on dogs and established the importance of bile in digestion.

In examining processes such as muscle contraction, fermentation, digestion, and putrefaction, Schwann sought to show that living phenomena were the result of physical causes rather than "some immaterial vital force". Nonetheless, he still sought to reconcile "an organic nature" with "a divine plan." Some writers have suggested that Schwann's move in 1838, and his decreased scientific productivity after that, reflect religious concerns and perhaps even a crisis relating to the theoretical implications of his work on cell theory. However, other authors regard this as misrepresenting his thinking, and reject the idea that Schwann went through an existential crisis or a mystical phase. Ohad Parnes uses Schwann's laboratory notebooks and other unpublished sources along with his publications to reconstruct his research as a unified progression. Florence Vienne draws on unpublished writings to discuss the ways in which cell theory, as a "unifying principle of organic development", related to the philosophical, religious, and political ideas of various proponents including Schwann.

In 1848, Schwann's compatriot Antoine Frédéric Spring convinced him to transfer to the University of Liège, also in Belgium. At Liège, Schwann continued to follow the latest advances in anatomy and physiology but did not himself make major new discoveries. He became something of an inventor. One of his projects was a portable respirator, designed as a closed system to support human life in environments where the surroundings cannot be breathed. By 1858 he was serving as professor of physiology, general anatomy and embryology. In 1863, the American Philosophical Society elected him an international member. As of 1872, he ceased to teach general anatomy, and as of 1877, embryology. He retired fully in 1879.

Schwann was deeply respected by his peers. In 1878, a festival was held to celebrate his years of teaching and his many contributions. He was presented with a unique gift: a book containing 263 autographed photographic portraits of scientists from various countries, each of them sent by the scientist to be part of the gift for Schwann. The volume was dedicated "To the creator of the cell theory, the contemporary biologists."

Three years after retiring, Schwann died in Cologne, on 11 January 1882. He was buried in the family tomb in Cologne's Melaten Cemetery.

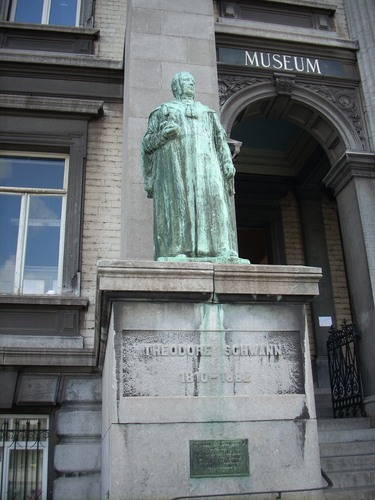
Bronze statue of Theodor Schwann at the entrance of the Institute of Zoology, University of Liege, Belgium

== Contributions ==
When viewed in the context of his unpublished writings and laboratory notes, Schwann's research can be seen as "a coherent and systematic research programme" in which biological processes are described in terms of material objects or "agents", and the causal dependencies between the forces that they exert, and their measurable effects. Schwann's idea of the cell as a fundamental, active unit then can be seen as foundational to the development of microbiology as "a rigorously lawful science".

=== Muscle tissue ===
Some of Schwann's earliest work in 1835 involved muscle contraction, which he saw as a starting point for "the introduction of calculation to physiology". He developed and described an experimental method to calculate the contraction force of the muscle, by controlling and measuring the other variables involved. His measurement technique was developed and used later by Emil du Bois-Reymond and others. Schwann's notes suggest that he hoped to discover regularities and laws of physiological processes.

=== Pepsin ===
In 1835, relatively little was known about digestive processes. William Prout had reported in 1824 that the digestive juices of animals contained hydrochloric acid. Schwann realized that other substances in digestive juices might also help to break down food. At the beginning of 1836, Schwann began to study digestive processes. He conceptualized digestion as the action of a physiological agent, which, though not immediately visible or measurable, could be characterized experimentally as a "peculiar specific substance".

Eventually Schwann found the enzyme pepsin, which he successfully isolated from the stomach lining and named in 1836. Schwann coined its name from the Greek word πέψις pepsis, meaning "digestion" (from πέπτειν peptein "to digest"). Pepsin was the first enzyme to be isolated from animal tissue. He demonstrated that it could break down the albumin from egg-white into peptones.

Even more importantly, Schwann wrote, by carrying through such analyses one could eventually "explain the whole developmental process of life in all organized bodies." During the next year, he studied both decomposition and respiration, constructing apparatus that he would later adapt for the study of yeast.

=== Yeast, fermentation, and spontaneous generation ===
Next Schwann studied yeast and fermentation. His work on yeast was independent of work done by Charles Cagniard de la Tour and Friedrich Traugott Kützing, all of whom published work in 1837. By 1836, Schwann had carried out numerous experiments on alcohol fermentation. Powerful microscopes made it possible for him to observe yeast cells in detail and recognize that they were tiny organisms whose structures resembled those of plants.

Schwann went beyond others who simply had noted the multiplication of yeast during alcoholic fermentation, first by assigning yeast the role of a primary causal factor, and then by claiming it was alive. Schwann used the microscope to carry out a carefully planned series of experiments that contraindicated two popular theories of fermentation in yeast. First he controlled the temperature of fluid from fermenting beer in a closed vessel in the presence of oxygen. Once heated, the liquid could no longer ferment. This disproved Joseph Louis Gay-Lussac's speculation that oxygen caused fermentation. It suggested that some sort of microorganism was necessary for the process to happen. Next, Schwann tested the effects of purified air and unpurified air. He sterilized the air by passing it through heated glass bulbs. Fermentation did not occur in the presence of purified air. It did occur in the presence of unpurified air, suggesting that something in the air started the process. This was strong evidence against the theory of spontaneous generation, the idea that living organisms could develop out of nonliving matter.

Schwann had demonstrated that fermentation required the presence of yeasts to start, and stopped when the yeasts stopped growing. He concluded that sugar was converted to alcohol as part of an organic biological process based on the action of a living substance, the yeast. He demonstrated that fermentation was not an inorganic chemical process like sugar oxidation. Living yeast was necessary for the reaction that would produce more yeast.

Although Schwann was correct, his ideas were ahead of most of his peers. They were strongly opposed by Justus von Liebig and Friedrich Wöhler, both of whom saw his emphasis on the importance of a living organism as supporting vitalism. Liebig, in contrast, saw fermentation as a series of purely chemical events, without involving living matter. Ironically, Schwann's work was later seen as being a first step away from vitalism. Schwann was the first of Müller's pupils to work towards a physico-chemical explanation of life. Schwann's view furthered a conceptualization of living things in terms of the biological reactions of organic chemistry, while Liebig sought to reduce biological reactions to purely inorganic chemistry.

The value of Schwann's work on fermentation eventually would be recognized by Louis Pasteur, ten years later. Pasteur would begin his fermentation research in 1857 by repeating and confirming Schwann's work, accepting that yeast were alive, and then taking fermentation research further. Pasteur, not Schwann, would challenge Liebig's views in the Liebig–Pasteur dispute. In retrospect, the germ theory of Pasteur, as well as its antiseptic applications by Lister, can be traced to Schwann's influence.

=== Cell theory ===
In 1837, Matthias Jakob Schleiden viewed and stated that new plant cells formed from the nuclei of old plant cells. Dining with Schwann one day, their conversation turned on the nuclei of plant and animal cells. Schwann remembered seeing similar structures in the cells of the notochord (as had been shown by Müller) and instantly realized the importance of connecting the two phenomena. The resemblance was confirmed without delay by both observers. In further experiments, Schwann examined notochordal tissue and cartilage from toad larvae, as well as tissues from pig embryos, establishing that animal tissues are composed of cells, each of which has a nucleus.

Schwann published his observations in 1838 in the Neue notisen geb. nat.-heilk. This was followed in 1839 by the publication of his book Mikroskopische Untersuchungen über die Uebereinstimmung in der Struktur und dem Wachsthum der Thiere und Pflanzen (Microscopic investigations on the similarity of structure and growth of animals and plants). It is considered a landmark work, foundational to modern biology.

In it Schwann declared that "All living things are composed of cells and cell products". He drew three further conclusions about cells, which formed his cell theory or cell doctrine. The first two were correct:

1. The cell is the unit of structure, physiology, and organization in living things.
2. The cell retains a dual existence as a distinct entity and a building block in the construction of organisms.

By the 1860s, these tenets were the accepted basis of cell theory, used to describe the elementary anatomical composition of plants and animals.

Schwann's theory and observations created a foundation for modern histology. Schwann claimed that "there is one universal principle of development for the elementary parts of organisms, however different, and this principle is the formation of cells." Schwann supported this claim by examining adult animal tissues and showing that all tissues could be classified in terms of five types of highly differentiated cellular tissues.

1. cells that are independent and separate, e.g. blood cells
2. cells that are independent but compacted together in layers, e.g. skin, fingernails, feathers
3. cells whose connecting walls have coalesced, e.g. cartilage, bones, and tooth enamel
4. elongated cells forming fibers, e.g. tendons and ligaments
5. cells formed by the fusion of walls and cavities, e.g. muscles, tendons and nerves

His observation that the single-celled ovum eventually becomes a complete organism, established one of the basic principles of embryology.

Schwann's third tenet, speculating on the formation of cells, was later disproven. Schwann hypothesized that living cells formed in ways similar to the formation of crystals. Biologists would eventually accept the view of pathologist Rudolf Virchow, who popularized the maxim Omnis cellula e cellula—that every cell arises from another cell—in 1857. The epigram was originally put forth by François-Vincent Raspail in 1825, but Raspail's writings were unpopular, partly due to his republican sentiments. There is no evidence to suggest that Schwann and Raspail were aware of each other's work.

=== Specialized cells ===
Schwann was particularly interested in nervous and muscular tissues. As part of his efforts to classify bodily tissues in terms of their cellular nature, he discovered the cells that envelope the nerve fibers, which are now called Schwann cells in his honor. How the fatty myelin sheaths of peripheral nerves were formed was a matter of debate that could not be answered until the electron microscope was invented. All axons in the peripheral nervous system are now known to be wrapped in Schwann cells. Their mechanisms continue to be studied.

Schwann also discovered that muscle tissue in the upper esophagus was striated. He speculated that the muscular nature of the esophagus enabled it to act as a pipe, moving food between the mouth and the stomach.

In examining teeth, Schwann was the first to notice "cylindrical cells" connected to both the inner surface of the enamel and the pulp. He also identified fibrils in the dentinal tubes, which later became known as "Tomes's fibers". He speculated on the possible structural and functional significance of the tubes and fibrils.

=== Metabolism ===
In his Microscopical researches, Schwann introduced the term "metabolism", which he first used in the German adjectival form "metabolische" to describe the chemical action of cells. French texts in the 1860s began to use le métabolisme. Metabolism was introduced into English by Michael Foster in his Textbook of Physiology in 1878.
