= Mannheimia varigena =

Scientific classification
- Domain: Bacteria
- Kingdom: Pseudomonadati
- Phylum: Pseudomonadota
- Class: Gammaproteobacteria
- Order: Pasteurellales
- Family: Pasteurellaceae
- Genus: Mannheimia
- Species: M. varigena

Binomial name
- Mannheimia varigena Angen et al. 1999

Species of bacterium

Mannheimia varigena is a gram-negative bacterial species, predominantly encountered in ruminants and historically classified within the former bacterial Pasteurella haemolytica complex, a group of bacteria involved in bovine respiratory disease (BRD) . It is pathogenic.
