= Histophilus somni =

Scientific classification
- Domain: Bacteria
- Phylum: Pseudomonadota
- Class: Gammaproteobacteria
- Order: Pasteurellales
- Family: Pasteurellaceae
- Genus: Histophilus Angen et al. 2003
- Species: H. somni

Binomial name
- Histophilus somni Angen et al. 2003

Synonyms
- Haemophilus somnus; Histophilus ovis; Histophilus agni

Species of bacteria

Histophilus somni is a non-motile, gram-negative, rod or coccobacillus shaped, facultative anaerobe bacterial species belonging to the family Pasteurellaceae. Prior to 2003, it was thought Haemophilus somnus, Histophilus ovis, and Histophilus agni were three different species, but now are all classified as Histophilus somni. Histophilus somni is a commensal bacteria of mucous membranes of the upper respiratory tract and reproductive tract with a global prevalence and is found in cattle and other small ruminants. Histophilus somni is also a known causative agent that is a part of the Bovine Respiratory Disease (BRD) complex, which typically involves multiple pathogens residing together in biofilm environments. Histophilus somni may also cause Histophilosus symptoms and clinical presentation will depend on the tissue affected. When disease does occur, it can be difficult to catch in time and is often diagnosed post mortem. This means that treatment often involves metaphylactic mass treatment or no treatment at all. This organism is more fastidious than others and requires knowledge for sample collection, storage and culture. Genomic studies related to this bacteria have enabled scientists to pinpoint antibiotic resistance genes.

== Description ==
Histophilus somni is a member of the Pasteurellaceae family and was first isolated from cattle in 1956. Histophilus somni is a gram-negative, rod or coccobacillus shaped bacteria that does not express pili or flagella making it non-motile. Many species of the Pasteurellaceae family are encapsulated; however, based on electron microscopy and ruthenium red staining results H. somni is not encapsulated.

Prior to 2003 Histophilus somni was considered to be three different species Haemophilus somnus, Histophilus ovis, and Histophilus agni. Histophilus somni is a normal part of mucosal microbiota in the upper respiratory and genital tract of bovine and ovine animals, yet, under the right conditions is one of multiple bacteria responsible for causing bovine respiratory disease. Under normal conditions BRD complex bacteria symbiotically reside together in biofilm environments. The biofilm protects H. somni from harmful substances while allowing co-existence with the host by down regulating virulence factor productions. Although H. Somni is known to survive the harsh intracellular environments of host phagocytic cells, the bacteria is considered fragile in the external environment and does not survive well outside of the host.

== Culture and biochemistry ==
=== Culture and identification ===
Histophilus is a fastidious bacterium and has some special requirements for culturing. A differentiating factor between Histophilus somni and the Haemophilus species is that Histophilus species are able to grow in the absence of Factor X (heat stable hemin) and Factor V (NAD) although their growth is increased in the presence of these factors. Histophilus grows best on chocolate agar at 37 °C with 5-10% CO_{2} and is unable to grow on MacConkey agar. Cultures have been developed in hopes to make culturing Histophilus easier, but trials are usually unsuccessful. Histophilus can be grown in Columbia broth or brain heart infusion broth with the supplementation of thiamine monophosphate. Culturing in a broth before plate culturing will help isolate Histophilus from other commensal bacteria at the sample site. The colonies are quite small and usually only reach a size of 1-2mm. When grown on blood agar, Histophilus will have a clear areas around the colonies. The dew-drop shaped colonies grown on chocolate agar are tinged yellow which is a distinguishing factor of these colonies.

Because Histophilus is fragile outside the host, care must be taken when collecting samples for laboratory diagnosis. Samples can try out very easily and should be cultured as soon as possible. The best storage method for samples to stay viable is for deep freezing below -60 degrees Celsius.

The best way to identify H. somni is through 16S rRNA gene PCR amplification. Microagglutination assays have been developed for identification in cattle however many animals have positive cross-reactive antibodies without having had the infection. Methods have been developed for the differentiation between ovine and bovine strains of H. somni, including restriction enzyme analysis. Microscopy can be used for identification when bacteria are stained with fluorescent antibody stain.

=== Biochemistry ===
Histophilus species can be difficult to identify with biochemical reactions as many of the tests used for identification do not have consistent results. Tests consistent throughout Histophilus colonies are oxidase and catalase tests, with oxidase having positive results and catalase being negative. Histophilus does not exhibit consistent hemolysis. Their ability to reduce nitrogen allows them to be facultative anaerobes and their growth on culture will increase with an increased atmospheric CO_{2}. Histophilus has the ability to ferment glucose, has variable results with lactose and mannitol and are unable to ferment sucrose. Antimicrobial testing has demonstrated that H. somni is still susceptible to most antimicrobials, though some strains have shown resistance to tetracycline.

Biochemical Test	Result
Catalase	Negative
Oxidase	Positive
Hemolysis	Variable
Indole	Variable
Glucose	Positive
Nitrate reduction	Positive
Sucrose	Negative
Lactose	Variable
Mannitol	Variable

== Genetics ==
In 1995 Haemophilus influenzae was genetically sequenced, a close relative to Histophilus somni and the first free living organism to have its complete genome sequenced. Due to the economic importance from production losses the genomes of both Histophilus somni pneumonia strain 2336 (2,263,857 base pairs with 1,980 protein coding genes) and preputial strain 129Pt (2,007,700 base pairs with 1,792 protein coding genes) have since been sequenced. The genome studies of Histophilus somni strains have identified specific markers encoding tetracycline resistance, and virulence factors, while allowing a better understanding of the role of horizontal gene transfer in the evolution of these strains Plasmid-borne antimicrobial resistance is an important topic in modern microbiology and occurs commonly in members of the Pasteurellaceae family. Histophilus somni with tetracycline resistant plasmids have been cultured from nasal swabs of calves. Using plasmid profiling as a way to identify isolated Histophilus somni from field samples gives veterinarians the ability to practice antimicrobial stewardship and reduce the impact of antimicrobial resistance.

== Pathogenesis and virulence ==
Histophilus somni can be characterized as an opportunistic pathogen and successful disease can be established because of poor environmental factors and the bacteria's own virulence factors. H. somni has numerous virulence factors including surface proteins, binding to and induction of apoptosis in host endothelial cells, immunoglobulin binding proteins, phase variation, endotoxin, biofilm formation, free radical inhibition, and survival of phagocytosis that allow the bacteria to colonize host tissues and evade the host's immune system. Depending on the strain of H. somni, not all of the listed virulence factors may be present.

Due to the role of H. somni as a commensal bacterium in the respiratory tract, an important part of establishing disease lies in the relationship between respiratory epithelial cells and the bacterium. It has been suggested that pathogenesis begins when the bacteria invades and crosses the pulmonary alveolar membrane or that it can cause both bovine turbinate (BT) and bovine alveolar type 2 (BAT2) cells to retract allowing passage of the bacteria into the bloodstream. In order successfully cross into the blood, in addition to causing respiratory endothelium cells to retract, H. somni disrupts the basement membrane via digestion by increasing production of metalloproteinases from BAT2 cells. After entry into the bloodstream, the bacteria can colonize other tissues around the body such as the heart and is involved in biofilm production on cardiac endothelium in bovine myocarditis.

Histophilus somni surface proteins have been studied in association to virulence and pathogenesis. In serum resistant virulent strains, outer membrane proteins such as a sialic acid-modified lipooligosaccharide (LOS) and immunoglobulin-binding protein-A (IbpA) were found to be important . H. somni LOS provides critical protection to the bacterium against host defences by undergoing phase variation both structurally and antigenically and acts as an endotoxin producing apoptotic activity in bovine epithelial cells, a classical sign of histophilosis. Upper respiratory tract colonization is possible through decoration of LOS with phase-variable phosphorycholine (ChoP) that binds to host cell platelet-activating factor receptors allowing H. somni to colonize host tissues while evading the immune response. H. somni immunoglobulin-binding proteins have two repeat domains (DR1 and DR2) that have cytotoxic Fic motifs as well as an ability to bind to bovine IgG2. IbpA DR2 can be taken up by BAT2 cells via pinocytosis and decreasing its cytotoxicity. DR1 and DR2 Fic motifs aid in cell infection by transmigration by causing retraction of respiratory cells.

Histophilus somni has the ability to produce a branching, mannose-galactose biofilm made primarily of polysaccharide. As previously mentioned, the bacteria is capable of producing biofilm in the heart of affected animals with clinical bovine myocarditis. Evidence suggests that biofilm formation allows H. somni to remain protected and persist within the host.

Another way that H. somni can evade the host immune system is by preventing intracellular killing. Although the mechanism is unknown, the bacteria is able to reduce the amount of reactive oxygen intermediates (ROIs) and therefore the oxidative burst from bovine polymorphonuclear cells (PMNs) reducing intracellular killing. In calves infected with H. somni it has been shown that phagocytosis of the bacteria is reduced in comparison to naive calves.

== Disease ==
The general term for diseases caused by Histophilus somni is called Histophilosis; Disease mainly affects cattle but can affect other small ruminants, sheep, bighorn sheep, and bison. Castration and weaning predispose young animals to disease caused by Histophilus somni. Other stressors such as overcrowding, poor weather, or shipping are other predisposing factors for all cattle. Viral infections are another predisposing factor for all cattle. With predisposing factors in mind, there are still many unknowns in regards to how and where Histophilus somni is first able to establish infection. Histophilosis may be present as a component of the Bovine Respiratory Disease Complex which has a higher incidence in feedlot cattle. Histophilosis may also present as septucemia, thrombotic meningoencephalitis-myelitis, pneumonia, pleuritis, pericarditis, necrotizing myocarditis, and arthritis. Clinical signs of Histophilosis may include central nervous system signs such as depression, behavioral changes, and ataxia, respiratory signs, abortion, conjunctivitis, fever, poor body condition, anorexia, and exercise intolerance but in general clinical signs will depend on which body tissues are affected. Histophilosis may present acutely with sudden death, but may also present only upon post mortem examination with lesions that may be found in multiple locations in the body including the pleura, lung tissue, myocardium, joints, retina, and reproductive tissues. Damage to these areas are caused by thrombus formation and thromboemboli in a septucemic animal followed by subsequent infarction and necrosis of tissue.

== Diagnosis and treatment ==
Diagnosis of Histophilus somni infection is difficult to do because the range of disease can be broad and vague. Clinicians can try to diagnose in herds using a microagglutination test but this also proves difficult because clinically healthy herds might have high antibody titers, there are many cross reactive antibodies, there are conflicting effects due to herd vaccination and there is asymptomatic colonization at mucosal sites. Histophilosis is often diagnosed on post mortem examination of cattle and gross lesion include pinpoint bloody lesions called petechia, larger areas of hemorrhage called ecchymoses and necrosis in the brain, vasculitis caused by endothelial damage and more. H. somni can be a part of the bovine respiratory disease (BRD) and causes pneumonia and has been detected in up to 40% of lungs with pneumonia. When H. somni is detected in pneumonic lungs, it presents as fibrinosuppurative bronchopneumonia and/or severe, diffuse fibrinous pleuritis. Diagnosis can be made by testing blood, cerebrospinal fluids, joint or pleural fluids for bacterial DNA via PCR or bacterial culture techniques. Although it is difficult to diagnose H. somni in herds, it is important to attempt it because bovine r disease is a production limiting disease and is reportable for domestic and international trade.

Typically there are three approaches to dealing with Histophilus somni in a herd of cattle; mass antibiotic treatment, H. somni vaccination or vaccination for other pathogens that are known to be a part of the BRD. These are not treatment per se, more methods of control or metaphylactic treatment, as we are treating many animals before there is an actual diagnosis. The goal is to reduce the onset of BRD or other clinical presentations of H. somni infections.

Like other bacterial infections, antibiotic susceptibility assays should be performed and it has been reported that Hisotphilus somni is usually susceptible to ceftiofur, penicillin, enrofloxacin, florfenicol, and tetracycline. This is troublesome because we know that it is difficult to diagnose before a post mortem is completed and there is no point in treating a deceased animal. Therefore, producers often treat metaphylactically, or on suspicion of infection. Tilmicosin can be added to the feed and has been shown to reduce the levels of H. somni in herds. It should only be added to the feed for 14 days, should be used sparingly as resistance is likely to occur otherwise, producers should be aware of withdrawal times. Problems with antibiotic treatment is emerging resistance to tetracyclines, enrofloxacin, and florfenicol. Biofilms that are formed by H. somni function to protect the bacteria from host immune defenses, they also provide a barrier that impedes antibiotic function. A new line of research is treating susceptible populations with bacterial isolates from subclinical carriers of Histophilus somni to act like a probiotic bacteria for the respiratory tract. A nasal inoculation of a nonpathogenic strain of H. somni could allow for the respiratory tract mucosa to be colonized with the commensal bacteria.

There are many licensed vaccines against H. somni, however licensed does not mean effective. There is a push to develop new vaccines that are multi-pathogenic and DIVA compatible. H. somni vaccines are usually killed cells or specific outer membrane proteins but have not been proven to be effective at protecting cattle against disease. There are many constraints to vaccine use on top of ineffectiveness, including the timeliness of administration, adverse reactions from individuals in the herd, and research into the epidemiology of the disease. In order to treat this infection, one must know which organ system it is affecting and some systems, such as the neurological presentation does not allow for timely treatment because by the time the disease is detected, it is too late for treatment.
