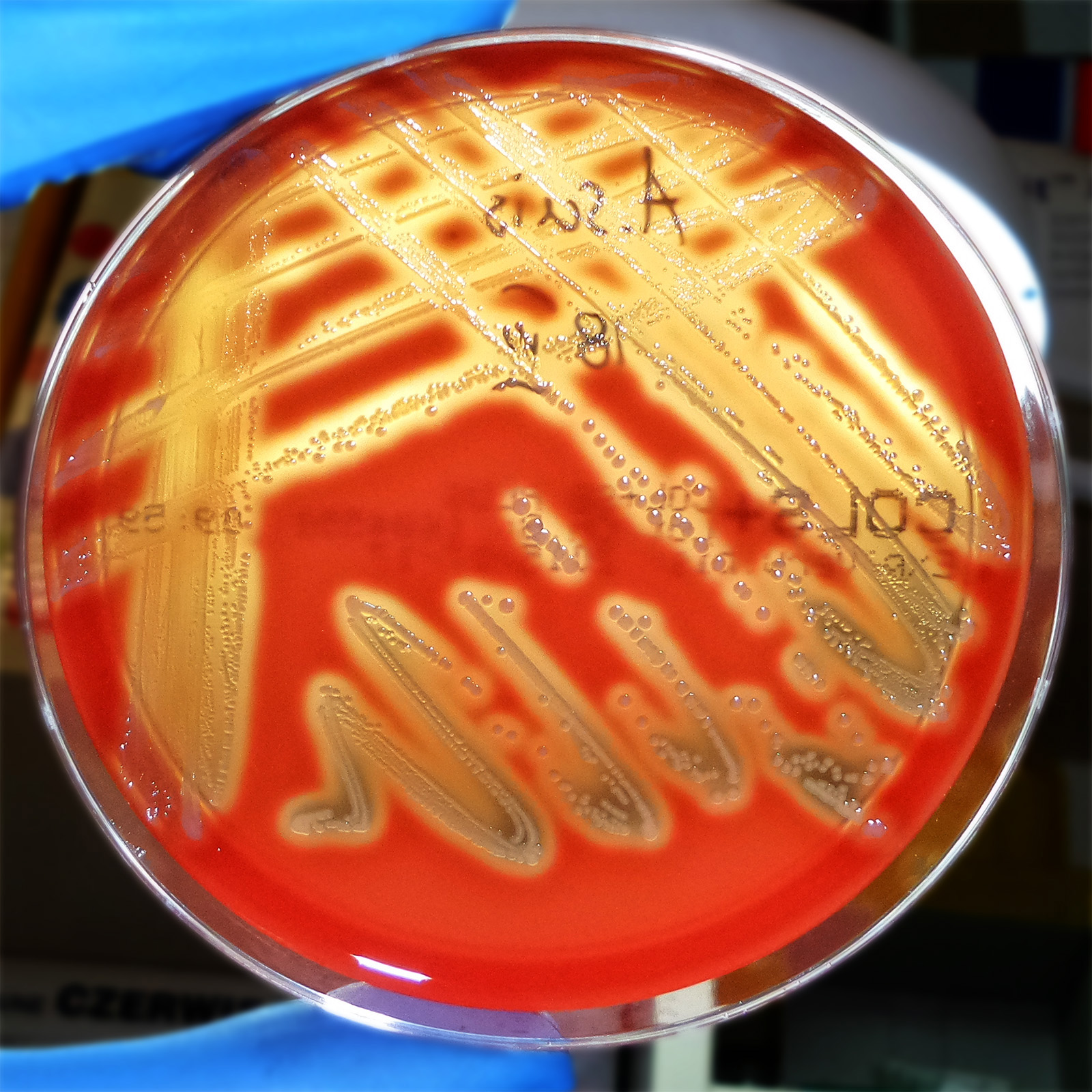
- Actinobacillus suis colonies on blood agar

Scientific classification
- Domain: Bacteria
- Kingdom: Pseudomonadati
- Phylum: Pseudomonadota
- Class: Gammaproteobacteria
- Order: Pasteurellales
- Family: Pasteurellaceae
- Genus: Actinobacillus
- Species: A. suis

Binomial name
- Actinobacillus suis van Dorssen and Jaartsveld 1962 (Approved Lists 1980)

= Actinobacillus suis =

Species of bacterium

Actinobacillus suis is a beta-haemolytic, Gram-negative bacterium of the family Pasteurellaceae. The bacterium has many strains and is the pathogen responsible for actinobacillosis in pigs of all ages. It can also infect wild birds, domestic ruminants, dogs, cats, and horses. The organism can be found in the respiratory tract and tonsils of both infected and healthy pigs that act as carriers. Transmission is via the respiratory tract and piglets are usually infected early on in life. Herds with a high health status are more at risk and outbreaks can be explosive.

== Clinical signs and diagnosis ==
Affected piglets can develop septicaemia, multifocal infections, and respiratory signs, and may die. Adult pigs may show signs relating to pneumonia, lethargy, anorexia, skin lesions similar to erysipelas, and sudden death. Diagnosis relies on the culture of sampled tissues to isolate the organism. Signs and necropsy findings may mimic diseases such as erysipelas, Glasser's disease, and Streptococcus suis or Actinobacillus pleuropneumoniae infection.

== Treatment and control ==
Antibiotics such as ceftiofur, gentamicin, and trimethoprim/sulfadiazine are effective in treating the disease if diagnosis is rapid enough. Biosecurity measures should be strictly followed in herds, including adequate quarantine time, testing, and disinfection protocol.
