= Actinobacillus equuli =

Scientific classification
- Domain: Bacteria
- Kingdom: Pseudomonadati
- Phylum: Pseudomonadota
- Class: Gammaproteobacteria
- Order: Pasteurellales
- Family: Pasteurellaceae
- Genus: Actinobacillus
- Species: A. equuli

Binomial name
- Actinobacillus equuli (van Straaten, 1918) Haupt, 1934

Species of bacterium

Actinobacillus equuli is a gram-negative, non-motile rod bacteria from the family Pasteurellaceae.

A. equuli is classified as a bio-containment level 2 organism under the U.S. Public Health Service Guidelines. Biochemical differentiation tests with positive results are: catalase, urease and oxidase tests. Actinobacillus equuli subspecies equuli is not hemolytic and is found in equine and porcine hosts. Another subspecies exists and is classified as Actinobacillus equuli subsp. haemolyticus which is positive for hemolysis and is found in horses and very rarely in rabbits. Occasionally, humans can become infected with A. equuli, more commonly as a result from destruction to the skin barrier, such as a horse bite.

A. equuli can commonly be isolated from the upper respiratory tract and oral cavity of adult healthy horses and can be important for diseases of foals, adult horses and pigs. It is a commensal bacteria unless it multiplies to overwhelming numbers, at which point it will cause disease. Specifically, A. equuli is known to cause neonatal sepsis in foals, known as Sleepy Foal Disease. Less commonly, A. equuli will cause disease in adult horses, resulting in respiratory infections. A. equuli also has the capability to cause kidney damage, arthritis and septicemia in affected pigs. The subspecies A. equuli subsp. haemolyticus results in similar pathogenesis as A. equuli subsp. equuli in horses. Due to these diseases and conditions, A. equuli can result in great economic losses especially in the equine industry.

== Taxonomy and genome ==
=== Taxonomy ===
It was previously thought that this bacteria was limited to the species level, however it is now divided into two subspecies of Actinobacillus equuli which include: A. equuli subsp. equuli, and A. equuli subsp. haemolyticus. Differentiation between these two subspecies can be done via biochemical tests including a CAMP test, and haemolytic properties. A. equuli subsp. equuli is non-haemolytic and CAMP negative, while A. equuli subsp. haemolyticus is haemolytic and CAMP positive.

Actinobacillus equuli Subspecies Differentiation Summary
Subspecies	Biochemical test	Result
equuli	CAMP Haemolytic	(−) (−)
haemolyticus	CAMP Haemolytic	(+) (+)

Isolation of the subspecies equuli have been found in both horses and pigs, but only subspecies haemolyticus has been isolated from horses.

=== Genome ===
Actinobacillus equuli genome's size is approximately 1.7 GDa and contains 40% guanine and cytosine in its genetic makeup.

A. equuli type strains include: ATCC 19392, CCUG 2041, GIP 103284, DSM 19655, JCM 2432, LMG 3736, and NCTC 8529. The 16S rRNA gene for A. equuli is AF381186, this helps classification of the bacteria to the species level but not to the subspecies level. This information helped determine that this species is closely related to Actinobacillus suis and Actinobacillus hominus. Another 16s rRNA study determined that an A. equuli type strain was 98.3% similar to A. lignieresii but are of different species.

Isolation of the subspecies equuli in the UK and Australia determined that it contained strains NCTC 8529^{T}, and I 5445/4. A. equuli subspecies haemolyticus contain strains: T 355/87, F 92, Ac 7 F 119, F 154^{T}, and F 490. PCR testing that results in the presence of the RTX gene allows differentiation to be made between the two subspecies, as only A. equuli subsp. equuli contains the RTX gene.

To differentiate similar strains of A. equuli from other genera originally thought to be A. equuli, ribotyping can be performed. The characteristic of being L-arabinose positive was thought to be an important taxonomic characteristic to classify A. equuli strains from others. Many different strains of A. equuli were determined through ribotyping, indicating that this species is diverse.

== Epidemiology ==
=== Horses ===
A. equuli is found on a variety of mucosal surfaces in the horse; it is considered to be part of the normal flora and an opportunistic pathogen. Despite it being a component of the normal flora, a mean isolation frequency as low as 37% (n =174) in adult horses and foals was detected in one study. However, the isolation frequency varied from 12 to 88% between farms. A. equuli does not have a preference for age, breed or gender, suggesting that husbandry practices may play a role in isolation frequency. An important aspect of the isolation frequency is that a horse or foal will not be culture positive every time it is swabbed, making it hard to determine the correct isolation frequency.

A. equuli is the causative agent in sleepy foal syndrome, which has been documented throughout the world. A. equuli does not only cause sleepy foal syndrome in foals, it is also a causative agent of pneumonia, muscular degeneration and jaundice in foals. On necropsy, foals were found to have the highest distribution of the bacteria in their synovial fluid, followed by the thoracic fluid and the liver. Important risk factors for foals acquiring an infection with A. equuli include failure of passive transfer, unsanitary foaling environments, and the presence of immunosuppressive conditions. Foals can become infected in-utero, during parturition or shortly after birth. Adults horses have similar diseases associated with A. equuli infections, including septicemia, respiratory and bone/joint diseases. Less common forms of infection can manifest as cutaneous abscess, pharyngitis, guttural pouch eustachitis, pericarditis, mastitis, urethritis, and lymphadenitis. Risk factors for developing infections in adult horses differs from that of foals, these factors include: stress, concurrent bacterial and/or viral infections, and discontinuities in the mucosa membranes allowing the bacteria entry into the body's internal compartment.

=== Swine ===
Infections in swine are more common in European countries compared to the North American Countries. Infections in the United States are extremely rare with only 2 cases reported prior to 2008 and there was a 30-year period leading up to 2008 in which there were no cases documented. There has only ever been one case reported in Manitoba, Canada in 2010. However, infections may have occurred but were unreported. An infection with A. equuli in swine commonly yields septicemia, metritis, and can result in abortion. It was once thought pigs acquired the infection directly from horses, but there has been reports of swine developing infections on farms that housed horses prior to housing swine, and there has also been one case in which the swine infected had no association with horses. Since the exact source of the infection in swine is not known, the risk factors are also relativity unknown.

== Microbiology ==
=== Morphology and culture growth ===
Actinobacillus equuli are rod-shaped bacteria that measure an average of 1 μm in length. According to a study of the complete genome of A. equuli, this microbe can be cultured on blood agar at an optimal temperature of 37 °C, but is able to grow in temperatures ranging from 20 °C to 44 °C. Two studies noted that the colonies of A. equuli are circular, smooth in texture and produce a slimy, viscous material that gives the colonies a gelatinous and glossy appearance. In addition to its mesophilic properties, A. equuli can grow at a pH of 6.0 to 8.4 which allows the organism to inhabit the intestine and survive in various structures such as the heart and adrenal gland. A. equuli is a facultative anaerobe and is moderately fastidious, therefore culture growth in the laboratory may be challenging.

=== Biochemical tests ===
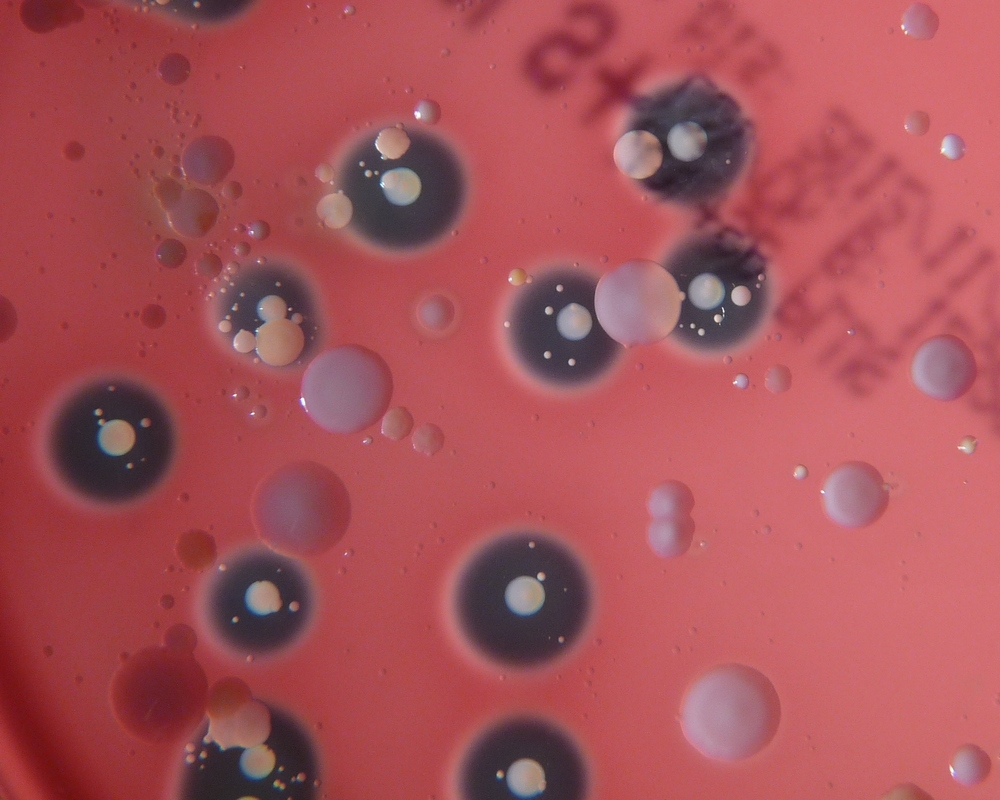
Beta hemolysis and gamma hemolysis on sheep blood agar by HansN / CC-BY-SA-3.0 Colonies surrounded by a transparent zone (black in this image) indicate β-hemolysis and represent inoculation with A. equuli subsp. haemolyticus. Absence of a coloured or transparent zone is indicative of γ-hemolysis which represents the inability to lyse red blood cells as would be the result of inoculation with A. equuli subsp. equuli.

As part of the genus Actinobacillus, Actinobacillus equuli is gram negative. A. equuli displays negative results after inoculation into motility agar indicating a lack of motility. A. equuli is equipped with catalase and urease enzymes and therefore yield positive results for these tests. Although facultatively anaerobic, A. equuli can survive in environments exposed to oxygen as it contains the enzyme cytochrome oxidase for use in the electron transport chain. Differentiation between A. equuli subsp. equuli and A. equuli subsp. haemolyticus can be made using sheep's blood agar or the CAMP test upon the absence or presence of beta-haemolysis, respectively.

A. equuli has varying results for sugar fermentation. A. equuli subsp. equuli is not capable of fermenting cellobiose, whereas the opposite is true for A. equuli subsp. haemolyticus, indicated by a negative and positive result for the cellobiose fermentation test, respectively. However, both subspecies are positive for lactose fermentation, which is indicated by using phenol red lactose broth. Gram negative lactose fermenters typically display positive results on MacConkey agar, however, a study on equine actinobacilli resulted in the lack of growth on MacConkey agar, which may suggest that A. equuli is too fastidious to grow on this medium. To add, A. equuli ferments D-glucose as indicated by a positive result for the oxidative-fermentation glucose test performed using Hugh-Leifson medium. Both subspecies yield a positive result for both raffinose and D-galactose fermentation and displays mixed results for D-mannitol fermentation, where only some biovars of A. equuli subsp. haemolyticus displayed a negative result while others were positive for D-mannitol fermentation.

A. equuli is negative for the methyl red test, which indicates that this microbe does not use the mixed acid fermentation pathway. A. equuli also displays a negative Voges-Proskauer test because A. equuli does not use the 2,3-butanediol fermentation pathway resulting in the absence of acetoin production. As demonstrated by a negative Simmon's citrate test result, A. equuli is not able to use citrate as its sole carbon source for energy.

Biochemical Properties of Actinobacillus equuli
Biochemical Test	Test Result
Gram Stain	-
Motility Agar	-
Catalase	+
Urease	+
Oxidase	+
Sheep's Blood Agar	A. equuli subsp. equuli: γ-haemolysis A. equuli subsp. haemolyticus: β-haemolysis
CAMP	A. equuli subsp. equuli: - A. equuli subsp. haemolyticus: +
Cellobiose Fermentation	A. equuli subsp. equuli: - A. equuli subsp. haemolyticus: +
Lactose Fermentation	+
MacConkey Agar	No growth
Oxidative/Fermentation Glucose	+, absent gas production
Raffinose Fermentation	+
D-galactose Fermentation	+
D-mannitol Fermentation	A. equuli subsp. equuli: + A. equuli subsp. haemolyticus: +/-
Methyl Red	-
Voges-Proskauer	-
Simmon's Citrate	-

== Pathogenesis ==
=== Horses ===
The major host for A. equuli is horses and under physiological conditions, A. equuli is part of horses' mucosal microbiota and does not normally cause clinical symptoms and/or lesions. However, when mucous membranes become compromised (wound penetration, ulcers/erosions) it allows for resident A. equuli to establish infection in the horses' internal environment. A. equuli's penetration into the body's internal environment has been reported to cause septicemia in newborn foals (also called sleepy foal disease) and localized infections in adult horses or in more severe cases acute or chronic peritonitis. It is unknown at this time if there are certain strains of A. equuli that have a greater virulence for adult horses and/or foals.

One study emphasized the contribution of A. equuli to the development of equine valvular endocarditis, where an isolate grown from the bacterial samples of a vegetative equine heart showed stunning resemblance with the phenotypical characteristics of a pure culture of A. equuli subsp. equuli. Although the exact source of infection is not yet known for horses with valvular endocarditis, it has been suggested that this microbe may be distributed through the body by the migration of Strongylus vulgaris, a common pasture parasite that inhabits the intestinal mucosa of horses and can migrate intravascularly to various organs of the body.

The pathogenicity and virulence factors of A. equuli are not well known, but following PCR analysis it has been determined that both subspecies (equuli and haemolyticus) have the RTX toxin gene which is capable of causing host species specific toxicity.

=== Swine ===
A. equuli has been found occasionally to cause disease in sows and their piglets however, like in horses, the pathogenicity is not well known. Unlike horses, PCR analysis did not find the aqxA gene and therefore concluded that only subspecies equuli and not subspecies haemolyticus causes disease in pigs. In sows, A. equuli is thought to cause disease as both a primary and a secondary pathogen. In piglets, since they usually show clinical signs within hours up to 4 days after parturition, it is hypothesized that the piglets are infected in utero. Nasal, fecal and vaginal swabs of infected sows were performed and pure cultures of A. equuli were only found in the vaginal swabs, supporting the hypothesis of in utero infection. Navel swabs and blood tests were performed on affected piglets and no A. equuli was cultured and bacteremia was not found. The pathogenicity causing the variation in clinical manifestations between cases of swine affected with A. equuli is not well understood.

The virulence factors of A. equuli in swine is also not well known.

=== Rabbits ===
There has been one case that found a rabbit presenting for necropsy, had a secondary infection caused by A. equuli. The rabbit was diagnosed with acute hepatitis characteristic of Tyzzer's disease caused by Clostridium piliforme. However, samples of the lungs and liver of the rabbit also resulted in the culture of A. equuli subspecies haemolyticus. A. equuli was determined to be a secondary opportunistic invader in this rabbit.

== Clinical signs ==
=== Horses ===
Acute signs: moderate to severe abdominal pain (colic), inappetence, intestinal stasis, lethargy.

Chronic signs: weight loss

Less frequently A. equuli has also been known to cause respiratory tract disease, abortion, haemorrhagic diatheses, pericarditis, periorchitis, enteritis, and peritonitis.

Sleepy foal syndrome: The acute form of sleepy foal syndrome presents as sepsis that can lead to death. Acutely infected foals appear dull, can have pneumonia and are neutropenic. However, in some cases a chronic form of the disease can manifest in the kidneys, lungs, and joints resulting in lesions to the affected areas.

Necropsies of horses infected with A. equuli showed consistent diffuse, bilateral, multifocal renal infarcts affecting the renal cortices. Fibrinous exudate and pulmonary edema was also a common finding.

=== Swine ===
Acute Signs in sows: Most commonly lethargy, inappetence, sudden death. Less commonly causes recumbency, hyperesthesia, pneumonia, bronchitis, surface wound infections, metritis, and septicemia.

Acute signs in piglets: lethargy, +/- pyrexia, severe arthritis (causing them to be non-weight bearing on that limb), encephalitis (although only neurological signs were lateral recumbency), septicemia and sudden death.

Chronic signs of piglets and sows: Poor doing and weight loss leading to culling or euthanasia

Sow Necropsies: Sows most commonly had dehydration, subcutaneous hemorrhage, embolic infarcts consisting of neutrophils and basophilic bacilli in the renal cortex. Embolic infarcts were also found in liver, lungs spleen, adrenal gland. Sows were concluded to have died of renal infarcts.

Gilt Necropsy: A gilt was found to have liquefactive necrosis in the epicardium of both auricles of the heart, valvular endocarditis of both mitral and tricuspid valves and thrombus of the right atrial wall. She had recently aborted her pregnancy and within the amniotic sacs of the aborted fetuses, a brown serous fluid was found. The gilt was concluded to have died of A. equuli causing valvular endocarditis and metritis with secondary septicemia.

Piglet Necropsies (6 hours to 4 days old belonging to infected sows): Piglets had petechial hemorrhage and multiple bacterial emboli in the renal cortex +/- multifocal purulent nephritis. Piglets were also found to have severe diffuse fibrinopurulent arthritis in one or more joints. Some piglets have additionally had a mild purulent encephalitis and perivasculitis of the vessels in the brain.

== Prevention and treatment ==
=== Horses ===
A. equuli causing sleepy foal syndrome in neonatal horses is most often attributed to the mother, as A. equuli is part of the normal microflora of the mare which makes it difficult to prevent exposure of the foal to A. equuli. In a majority of reported cases, sleepy foal syndrome is more than likely a direct result of failure of passive transfer thus, it is important that neonatal foals receive colostrum to reduce the incidence of the disease caused by A. equuli. Reducing environmental contamination when the foal is born has also shown to be effective at reducing the incidence of disease. In adult horses, there has been a reported case of infection caused by A. equuli associated with gastrointestinal ulceration possibly due to the use of phenylbutazone for extended periods of time. Ulceration of the GI mucosa can allow A. equuli to set up an opportunistic infection. Limiting the duration or dose of phenylbutazone could reduce the chance of ulceration and thus an infection. Preventative treatments can also include minimizing the risk of infection with other parasites or pathogens that could weaken the immune system or cause physical damage that allows A. equuli to set up an infection. Some studies have found that A. equuli infections have been established after exposure with Strongylus vulgaris as the migrating larvae can transport A. equuli to various parts of the body resulting in infection. Overall, ensuring the health of the horse is maintained has shown to be the best strategy to reduce infection with A. equuli.

Treatment and supportive care of a horses infected with A. equuli has been shown to be very effective when detected early, resulting in low incidence of death associated with infection. One study involving 51 horses with peritonitis associated with A. equuli, found treatment with procaine penicillin or procaine penicillin and gentamicin sulphate to be effective. However, antimicrobial sensitivity testing of 14 cultures showed 1 culture to be resistant to penicillin, 1 resistant to trimethoprim-sulphadimidine and 1 resistant to a combination of penicillin and trimethoprim-sulphadimidine. Thus the study recommended the treatment with procaine penicillin and gentamicin sulphate in cases of antimicrobial resistance. In neonatal foals with sleepy foal syndrome, treatment failure resulting in fatal outcome has been recorded because of the severity of the condition and an inability of the neonate to successfully mount an immune response against the pathogen due to failure of passive transfer. In other cases, treatment of sleepy foal syndrome included antibiotic treatment with amoxicillin-clavulanic acid and amikacin sulfate along with fluid therapy.

=== Swine ===
During the outbreak at the swine farm in Canada, both preventative antibiotic therapy in the water and feed of the entire herd and individual therapy of the clinically affected sows was administered. Susceptibility testing showed that A. equuli was sensitive to ampicillin, tetracycline, trimethoprim, ceftiofur, neomycin and spectinomycin. Clinically affected sows were determined by failure to rise when stimulated and temperature, and were additionally treated with antibiotics and anti-inflammatories. Some of the clinically affected sows who survived the initial infection were euthanized or culled due to wasting and poor-doing. Sow mortality ranged from an average of 8 deaths per day at the beginning of the outbreak, to 2 deaths/day by day 50 of the infection.

Prevention of A. equuli spread in swine operations with herd outbreak from the infected to the non-infected sows or newly introduced gilts was mitigated by the development of a herd-specific killed vaccine.

== Zoonotic potential ==
A. equuli commonly affects equine hosts. Occasionally, A. equuli has been found to cause disease in sows and their newborn piglets. There was one case describing a rabbit who was infected with A. equuli.

Humans have also been found to have infections caused by A. equuli after being bit by a horse. One case study described a stable hand who had been bitten by a horse 12 hours prior, presenting to the hospital with a red and swollen laceration on the dorsal side of his hand. A. equuli-like species was cultured from the wound and was determined to cause the infection along with A. lignieresii. Additionally, there has been one case of a 13-year-old boy who developed meningitis and sepsis from A. equuli. The boy had visited a farm 3 days prior but denied coming into direct contact with horses or pigs. Furthermore, a blood sample from a 53 year old butcher with septicemia was found to contain A. equuli after the individual had lacerated his left thumb. Prior to the discovery, A. equuli had never been recorded in the blood of a human with septicemia.

== Susceptibility and resistance ==
Susceptibility testing performed found that A. equuli was sensitive to ampicillin, tetracycline, trimethorprin, ceftiofur, neomycin, cefotaxime, ceftazidime, imipenem, meropenem, ciprofloxacin, levofloxacin, piperacillin-tazobactam, tigecycline and spectinomycin.

However, after conducting susceptibility testing, one study found A. equuli resistance to penicillin, ampicillin, streptomycin, neomycin, chloramphenicol, methicillin, and nalidixic acid. The study also found susceptibility of A. equuli to gentamicin, tetracycline, nitrofurantoin, polymyxin B, sulphonamides, trimethoprim with sulphonamides, carbenicillin, cephalotin, and amoxycillin with clavulanic acid. The study did note it had differing results in susceptibility tests than other studies had reported, which could be a result of regional or strain differences or differences in the methods of the susceptibility testing between studies. Additional reports have found A. equuli resistance to oxacillin and trimethoprim-sulphadimidine along with developed resistance to tetracycline after one month of use in sows.
