= Florfenicol =

Chemical compound

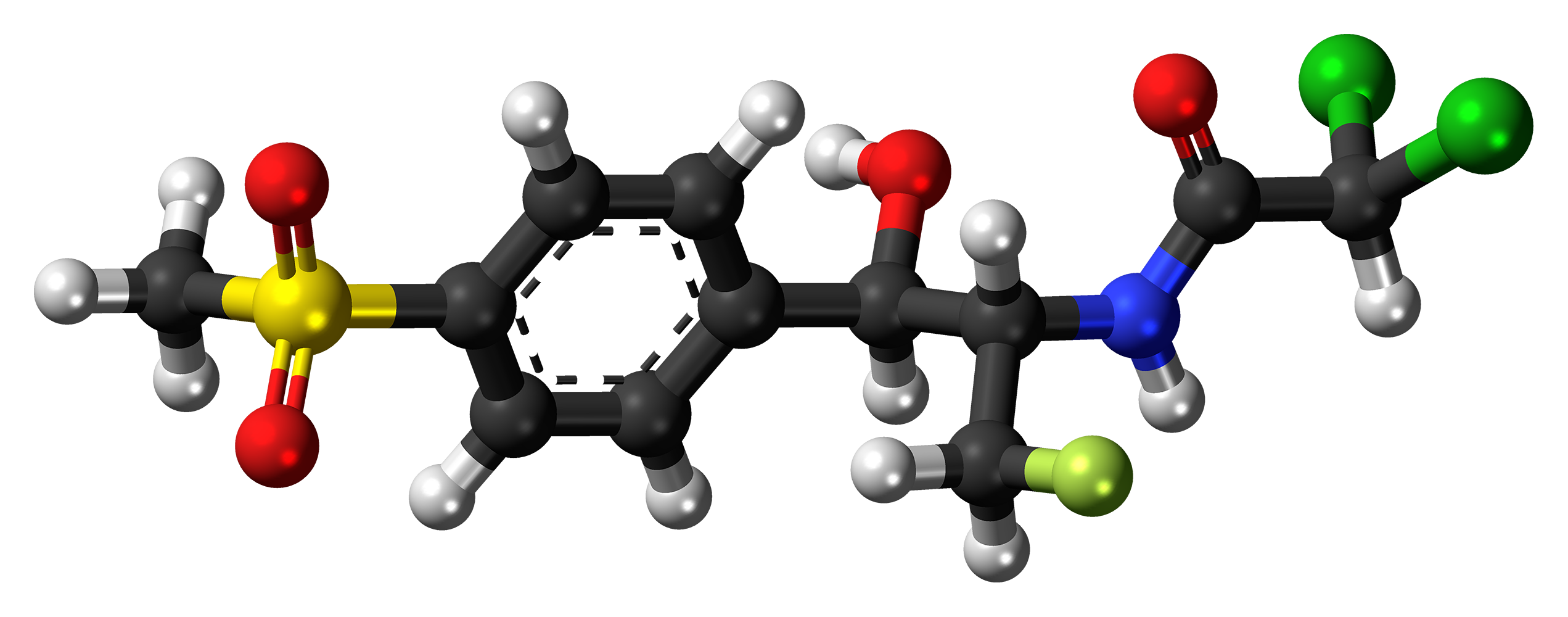

Clinical data
- Trade names: Nuflor
- Other names: 2,2-dichloro-N-((1R,2S)-3-fluoro-1-hydroxy-1-(4-(methylsulfonyl)phenyl)propan-2-yl)ethanamide
- AHFS/Drugs.com: International Drug Names
- Routes of administration: Intramuscular, subcutaneous
- ATCvet code: QJ01BA90 (WHO) QJ51BA90 (WHO)

Legal status
- Legal status: AU: S4 (Prescription only); US: ℞-only

Identifiers
- IUPAC name: 2,2-dichloro-N-{(1R,2S)-3-fluoro-1-hydroxy-1-[4-(methanesulfonyl)phenyl]propan-2-yl}acetamide
- CAS Number: 73231-34-2
- PubChem CID: 114811
- ChemSpider: 102776
- UNII: 9J97307Y1H
- KEGG: D04194
- ChEBI: CHEBI:87185
- ChEMBL: ChEMBL1241590
- CompTox Dashboard (EPA): DTXSID9045500
- ECHA InfoCard: 100.170.898

Chemical and physical data
- Formula: C_{12}H_{14}Cl_{2}FNO_{4}S
- Molar mass: 358.21 g·mol^{−1}
- 3D model (JSmol): Interactive image
- SMILES: ClC(Cl)C(=O)N[C@@H]([C@H](O)c1ccc(cc1)S(=O)(=O)C)CF
- InChI: InChI=1S/C12H14Cl2FNO4S/c1-21(19,20)8-4-2-7(3-5-8)10(17)9(6-15)16-12(18)11(13)14/h2-5,9-11,17H,6H2,1H3,(H,16,18)/t9-,10-/m1/s1; Key:AYIRNRDRBQJXIF-NXEZZACHSA-N

Florfenicol is a fluorinated synthetic analog of thiamphenicol, mainly used as an antibiotic in veterinary medicine.

Florfenicol is marketed by Schering-Plough Animal Health (now merged into Merck) under the brand name Nuflor®; by Merck under the brand name Aquaflor®; and, by Phibro under the brand name PAQ Flor®.

Florfenicol is available a generic medication.

== Veterinary uses ==
In the United States, florfenicol is indicated for the treatment of bovine respiratory disease (BRD) associated with Mannheimia haemolytica, Pasteurella multocida, and Histophilus somni, for treatment of bovine interdigital phlegmon (foot rot, acute interdigital necrobacillosis, infectious pododermatitis) associated with Fusobacterium necrophorum and Prevotella melaninogenica.

In swine, it is indicated for the treatment of respiratory infections caused by Actinobacillus pleuropneumoniae, Bordetella bronchiseptica, Glaesserella parasuis, P. multocida, and Streptococcus suis.

Florfenicol is also used in aquaculture, and is licensed for use in the United States for the control of enteric septicemia in catfish.

Since the early 2000s, it has been used in the European Union, treating mainly primary or secondary colibacillosis in broiler and parent flocks.

The use of florfenicol in horses, and likely in other equids, typically causes diarrhea. This has been anecdotally reported to progress to lethal cases of acute colitis. Therefore, use of this antimicrobial in the equine patient should be limited to cases in which other, safer, options are not available.

In November 2024, the US Food and Drug Administration approved Paqflor (florfenicol), the first generic florfenicol drug for controlling mortality in certain species of freshwater-reared fish. Paqflor contains the same active ingredient (florfenicol) as the approved brand name drug product, Aquaflor, which was first approved in October 2005. In addition, the FDA determined that Paqflor contains no inactive ingredients that may significantly affect the bioavailability of the active ingredient. Paqflor is indicated for freshwater-reared salmonids: for the control of mortality due to furunculosis associated with Aeromonas salmonicida. For the control of mortality due to coldwater disease associated with Flavobacterium psychrophilum; freshwater-reared finfish: for the control of mortality due to columnaris disease associated with Flavobacterium columnare; catfish: for the control of mortality due to enteric septicemia of catfish associated with Edwardsiella ictaluri; freshwater-reared warmwater finfish: for the control of mortality due to streptococcal septicemia associated with Streptococcus iniae.

== Contamination ==
Florfenicol was among the drug contaminants in a brand of supermarket eggs in Taiwan and Iran.
