= Basfia =

Scientific classification
- Domain: Bacteria
- Kingdom: Pseudomonadati
- Phylum: Pseudomonadota
- Class: Gammaproteobacteria
- Order: Pasteurellales
- Family: Pasteurellaceae
- Genus: Basfia; Kuhnert et al. 2010
- Species: B. succiniciproducens

Binomial name
- Basfia succiniciproducens Kuhnert et al. 2010

Monotypic genus of bacterium

Basfia is a monotypic genus of bacterium from the Pasteurellaceae family, first described in 2010. Its only species, Basfia succiniciproducens, is a gram-negative, facultatively anaerobic, and immobile bacterium. It was first isolated from bovine rumen in 2008. Its ability to produce relatively large quantities of succinic acid through fermentation in biomass hydrolysates is potentially important for industrial biotechnology.

== Features ==
Its beneficial features include broad facultative anaerobic metabolism, genetic tractability, and substrate utilization. The bacterium is cocci to rod-shaped and, like all Pasteurellaceae, has no flagella, i.e., it cannot actively move. The bacterium is gram-negative, i.e., it only has a thin, single-layer murein envelope that does not contain any teichoic acids. Information on individual cell sizes is not scientifically documented. Colonies reach a diameter of 0.1 to 0.5 millimeters after 24 hours of growth and are colored translucent gray.

Basfia succiniciproducens, like the majority of Pseudomonadota, was characterized solely by physiological or biochemical features, while it has no eidonomic features compared to other species and genera of the Pasteurellaceae. The first description fulfills the minimum standards applicable for characterizing a new species and genus within the Pasteurellaceae.

All known strains anaerobically produce significant amounts of succinic acid, acetic acid, and formic acid as metabolic products during fermentation.

== Isolation ==
The bacterium was isolated during a screening for bacteria from the rumen of domestic cattle that are potentially useful in succinic acid production. It was first isolated in 2008, but its scientific description was made available in 2009. However, according to information from Kuhnert et al. 2009, it was not validly described.

== Characteristics ==
B. succiniciproducens can be cultivated biotechnologically both on the classic fermentation medium glucose (sugar syrup, starch) and on glycerine. Glycerin is obtained as raw glycerin in the production of rapeseed methyl ester (biodiesel) in large quantities and is therefore available as an inexpensive raw material for combined use.

In 2008, Scholten was able to achieve yields of up to 5.8 g/L succinic acid based on D-glucose and sucrose with the newly isolated and at the time not yet described bacterium, with a productivity of up to 1.5 g/L 1·h, and the yield was a maximum of 0.6 grams of succinic acid per gram of substrate. They achieved yields of 8.4 g/L, 0.9 g/L·h, and 1.2 g/g substrate with raw glycerol. In comparison with other bacteria, particularly Anaerobiospirillum succiniciproducens, Escherichia coli, and Actinobacillus succinogenes, the maximum yield per liter is comparatively low, but the yield based on the substrate input and the productivity are comparable and can also be optimized by optimizing the logs. Bacteria based on raw glycerin as a substrate, for which the first approaches to continuous cultivation are in development, show particularly good properties.

== Application of succinic acid ==
Succinic acid is a chemical with an annual demand of around 15,000 tons. It is conventionally produced based on butadiene and n-butane with maleic anhydride as an intermediate. It is primarily used as a basis for various chemical and pharmaceutical industries (tetrahydrofuran, 1,4-butanediol, etc.) and bio-based plastics such as polyamides (PA), polyesters, co-polyesters, and polyesteramides. Succinic acid is of interest as a biotechnologically manufactured product, and the market potential of several hundred thousand tons is forecasted. Together with other representatives of the C4-dicarboxylic acids, such as fumaric and malic acid, the US Department of Energy identified succinic acid in 2004 as one of twelve platform chemicals with particular biotechnological manufacturing potential.

Various other potential succinic acid producers have been examined, such as Anaerobiospirillum succiniciproducens, Escherichia coli, Mannheimia succiniciproducens, and Corynebacterium glutamicum. Metabolic engineering for the production of high quantities of succinic acid should be optimized.
