= Mannheimia ruminalis =

Scientific classification
- Domain: Bacteria
- Kingdom: Pseudomonadati
- Phylum: Pseudomonadota
- Class: Gammaproteobacteria
- Order: Pasteurellales
- Family: Pasteurellaceae
- Genus: Mannheimia
- Species: M. ruminalis

Binomial name
- Mannheimia ruminalis Angen et al. 1999

Species of bacterium

Mannheimia ruminalis is a species of gram-negative bacterium. It is pathogenic.
