= Pasteurella stomatis =

Scientific classification
- Domain: Bacteria
- Kingdom: Pseudomonadati
- Phylum: Pseudomonadota
- Class: Gammaproteobacteria
- Order: Pasteurellales
- Family: Pasteurellaceae
- Genus: Pasteurella
- Species: P. stomatis

Binomial name
- Pasteurella stomatis Mutters et al. 1985

Species of bacterium

Pasteurella stomatis, is a species of Gram-negative, nonmotile, penicillin-sensitive coccobacillus from the family Pasteurellaceae. Bacteria from this family cause zoonotic infections in humans. These infections manifest themselves as skin or soft tissue infections after an animal bite.
