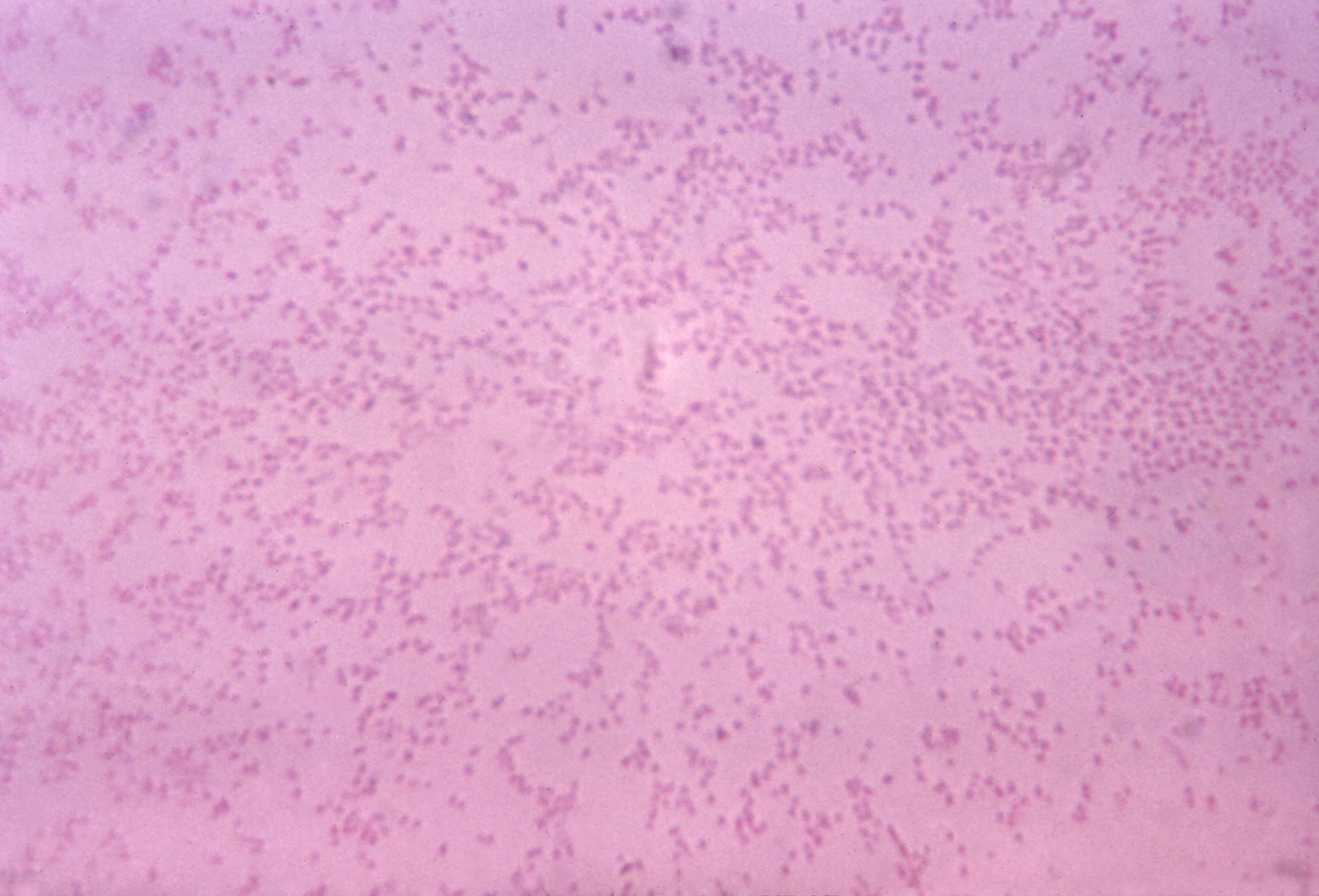
- Gram-stained photomicrograph depicting numerous Pasteurella multocida bacteria

Scientific classification
- Domain: Bacteria
- Kingdom: Pseudomonadati
- Phylum: Pseudomonadota
- Class: Gammaproteobacteria
- Order: Pasteurellales
- Family: Pasteurellaceae
- Genus: Pasteurella; Trevisan 1887

Type species
- Pasteurella multocida (Lehmann and Neumann 1899) Rosenbusch and Merchant 1939 (Approved Lists 1980)

Species
- P. aerogenes P. anatis P. avium P. bettyae P. caballi P. canis P. dagmatis P. gallicida P. gallinarum P. granulomatis P. langaaensis P. lymphangitidis P. mairii P. multocida P. oralis P. pneumotropica P. skyensis P. stomatis P. testudinis P. trehalosi P. ureae P. volantium

= Pasteurella =

Genus of bacteria

Pasteurella is a genus of Gram-negative, facultatively anaerobic bacteria. Pasteurella species are nonmotile and pleomorphic, and often exhibit bipolar staining ("safety pin" appearance). Most species are catalase- and oxidase-positive. The genus is named after the French chemist and microbiologist, Louis Pasteur, who first identified the bacterium now known as Pasteurella multocida as the agent of chicken cholera.

== Pathogenesis ==
Many Pasteurella species are zoonotic pathogens, and humans can acquire an infection from domestic animal bites. P. multocida is the most frequent causative agent in human Pasteurella infection. Common symptoms of pasteurellosis in humans include swelling, cellulitis, and bloody drainage at the site of the wound. Infection may progress to nearby joints, where it can cause further swelling, arthritis, and abscesses.

Pasturella spp. can be transmitted through the bite of a dog. The common occurrence of the bacteria is a reason to be medically proactive and defensive (antibacterial treatments are often necessary) if a bite occurs. No human vaccines have been approved for any pathogen of this genus.

=== Animal hosts ===
==== Symptomatic hosts ====
In cattle, sheep, and birds, Pasteurella species can cause a life-threatening pneumonia.

P. multocida is also known to cause morbidity and mortality in rabbits. The predominant syndrome is upper respiratory disease. P. multocida can be endemic among rabbit colonies and is often transmitted through nasal secretions. P. multocida can survive several days in water or moist areas.

==== Not classified ====
They have also been reported in red kangaroos and potoroos. Pasteurella Bisgaard taxon 45 was identified in late 2023 as the organism that killed nearly 400 elephants in Zimbabwe and Botswana during the summer of 2020

Pasteurella haemolytica is a species that infects mainly cattle and horses.

==== Asymptomatic hosts ====
In cats and dogs, however, Pasteurella is not a cause of disease, and constitutes part of the normal flora of the nose and mouth.

==== Animal vaccination ====
Vaccination against P. multocida is widely practiced for birds (especially chickens) due to the devastation caused by fowl cholera. There are several serotypes of this species with limited cross-immunity between each other; for birds A1 and A3 are of concern and vaccinated against.

There is also a vaccine for pigs that combine a recombinant, genetically detoxified version of P. multocida dermonecrotic toxin with killed whole Bordetella bronchiseptica.

=== Antibiotic sensitivity ===
Pasteurella spp. are generally susceptible to chloramphenicol, the penicillins, tetracycline, and the macrolides.

P. multocida is highly sensitive to enrofloxacin, oxytetracycline, chloramphenicol, and ampicillin.

=== Possible complications ===
Osteomyelitis is a possible complication of P. multocida, which can subsequently lead to necrotizing fasciitis.
