= Miroungae =

Miroungae may refer to:

- Bisgaardia miroungae, species of bacteria
- Facklamia miroungae, species of bacteria
