= Gallibacterium melopsittaci =

Scientific classification
- Domain: Bacteria
- Kingdom: Pseudomonadati
- Phylum: Pseudomonadota
- Class: Gammaproteobacteria
- Order: Pasteurellales
- Family: Pasteurellaceae
- Genus: Gallibacterium
- Species: G. melopsittaci

Binomial name
- Gallibacterium melopsittaci Bisgaard et al. 2009

Type strain
- CCM 7538, CCUG 36331, 1596/S4/90, 3077/89

Species of bacterium

Gallibacterium melopsittaci is a gram-negative bacterial species in the genus Gallibacterium. Gallibacterium melopsittaci can cause salpingitis, septicaemia, peritonitis and bacteremia in birds like parakeets.
