= Actinobacillus seminis =

Scientific classification
- Domain: Bacteria
- Kingdom: Pseudomonadati
- Phylum: Pseudomonadota
- Class: Gammaproteobacteria
- Order: Pasteurellales
- Family: Pasteurellaceae
- Genus: Actinobacillus
- Species: A. seminis

Binomial name
- Actinobacillus seminis Sneath and Stevens 1990

Species of bacterium

Actinobacillus seminis is a Gram-negative bacterium associated with epididymitis of sheep.
