= Ursidibacter maritimus =

Scientific classification
- Domain: Bacteria
- Kingdom: Pseudomonadati
- Phylum: Pseudomonadota
- Class: Gammaproteobacteria
- Order: Pasteurellales
- Family: Pasteurellaceae
- Genus: Ursidibacter
- Species: U. maritimus

Binomial name
- Ursidibacter maritimus Hansen et al. 2015

Type strain
- CCUG 65144, DSM 28137

Species of bacterium

Ursidibacter maritimus is a gram-negative bacterium from the genus of Ursidibacter which has been isolated from the oral cavity of a polar bear from Greenland.
