= Pasteurella canis =

Scientific classification
- Domain: Bacteria
- Kingdom: Pseudomonadati
- Phylum: Pseudomonadota
- Class: Gammaproteobacteria
- Order: Pasteurellales
- Family: Pasteurellaceae
- Genus: Pasteurella
- Species: P. canis

Binomial name
- Pasteurella canis Mutters et al. 1985

Species of bacterium

Pasteurella canis is a Gram-negative, nonmotile, penicillin-sensitive coccobacillus from the family Pasteurellaceae. Bacteria from this family cause zoonotic infections in humans, which manifest themselves as skin or soft-tissue infections after an animal bite. This species has been known to cause serious disease in immunocompromised patients.

Pasteurella was first described around 1880 and thought to be associated with chicken cholera and hemorrhagic septicemia in animals. The genus was first cultured in 1885. In 1920, strains of Pasteurella were isolated and observed in human infections.

== Nomenclature ==
Pasteurella canis sp. nov. was previously classified as P. multocida biotype 6 or “dog-type” strains. In 1985, Pasteurella underwent taxonomic reclassification based on DNA hybridization, resulting in several subspecies of P. multocida and new Pasteurella species, including P. canis.

Pasteurella canis includes two biotypes: biovar 1 originated from canines, whereas biovar 2 originated from bovines. The two biotypes are distinguishable from an indole test: biovar 1 is indole positive whereas biovar 2 is indole negative.

== Microbiology ==
Pasteurella canis is a Gram-negative coccobacillus that shows bipolar staining. P. canis forms small, grey-colored, round, and smooth colonies. Colonies are non-haemolytic. P. canis is non-motile.

Pasteurella canis is reported as aerobic and facultative anaerobic in different sources. It metabolizes both glucose and sucrose. In addition to morphological typing, biochemical tests are commonly used to identify the species. P. canis is positive for catalase, oxidase, and ornithine decarboxylase, but negative for lysine decarboxylase, V-factor (nicotinamide adenine dinucleotide), D-mannitol, dulcitol, D-sorbitol, urease, maltose, and L-arabinose. P. canis can also be indole positive or negative depending on the biotype.

== Molecular typing ==
Molecular analysis of the genome has become the popular method to identify bacteria. The genome of P. canis has yet to be fully sequenced, but several genes and their sequences were already identified. Among them, 16S rRNA, 23S rRNA, RNA polymerase subunit B (rpoB), and manganese-dependent superoxide dismutase (sodA) are used to study Pasteurella phylogeny. However, molecular and biochemical analyses often show conflicting results. For example, research has suggested some P. canis strains were in fact members of P. multocida based on DNA analysis. Phylogenetic analysis of P. canis and P. dagmatis also showed conflicting results, based on their 16s rRNA sequences and biochemical tests done on the strains.

== Disease ==
Pasteurella canis is an opportunistic pathogen that can infect both animals and humans.

=== Animal infections ===
Pasteurella canis can be found in healthy domesticated, farm-raised, and wild animals, such as dogs, cats, rabbits, horses, sheep, cattle, ferrets, deer, and even California sea lions. The bacteria are normally isolated from the oral cavities and respiratory tracts of these animals. P. canis biotype 1 was shown to secrete a toxin analogous to P. multocida toxin, but its identity is unknown. P. canis is responsible for a number of canine infections, including systemic infection, external otitis, bacterial rhinitis, vertebral osteomyelitis, meningomyelitis (a type of myelitis), bronchopneumonia, tracheitis, paranasal sinus inflammation, and toxicosis. Horses infected with the bacteria may develop arthritis. The bacteria also cause pneumonia in cattle and various infections in sheep, cats, rabbits, and deer.

=== Human infections ===
Pasteurella canis usually does not affect humans but may be transmitted from animals to humans through animal bites, scratches, or licking over wounds. However, some patients developed infections without any scratches and puncture wounds. In one case, a patient exposed to rabbit secretions was infected with P. canis. Those with rheumatoid arthritis, cirrhosis, and diabetes mellitus are more susceptible to the bacteria. Patients who are immunocompromised also have higher risk of infections.

Pasteurella canis often causes soft-tissue infections and wound infections, as well as systemic bacteremia in humans. These infections include peritonitis, conjunctivitis, osteomyelitis, and arthritis. Joint prosthetics can also be infected by the bacteria. Less commonly, this bacterium may result in respiratory infections, septic arthritis, endocarditis, and meningitis. Most patients with pulmonary infections caused by this species are elderly with pre-existing chronic lung diseases such as COPD.

== Antibiotics treatment and resistance ==
Many common antibiotics can successfully treat P. canis infections in both humans and animals. P. canis has shown sensitivity to ampicillin (penicillin), cefuroxime (second-generation cephalosporin), most third-generation cephalosporins (cefixime, cefotaxime, ceftriaxone, and cefoperazone), ciprofloxacin (quinolones), trimethoprim/sulfamethoxazole (sulfonamides), chloramphenicol, most aminoglycosides, and tetracycline. However, the bacterium is also resistant to numerous drugs, such as dicloxacillin (penicillin), some aminoglycosides (spectinomycin and neomycin), vancomycin (glycopeptides), cephalexin and cefadoxil (first-generation cephalosporin), erythromycin (macrolides), and imipenem (carbapenem).
