= Pasteurella mairii =

Scientific classification
- Domain: Bacteria
- Kingdom: Pseudomonadati
- Phylum: Pseudomonadota
- Class: Gammaproteobacteria
- Order: Pasteurellales
- Family: Pasteurellaceae
- Genus: Pasteurella
- Species: P. mairii

Binomial name
- Pasteurella mairii Sneath and Stevens 1990

Species of bacterium

Pasteurella mairii is a species of Gram-negative bacterium from the family Pasteurellaceae. P. mairii causes abortion in sows.
