= Bisgaardia hudsonensis =

Scientific classification
- Domain: Bacteria
- Kingdom: Pseudomonadati
- Phylum: Pseudomonadota
- Class: Gammaproteobacteria
- Order: Pasteurellales
- Family: Pasteurellaceae
- Genus: Bisgaardia
- Species: B. hudsonensis

Binomial name
- Bisgaardia hudsonensis Foster et al. 2011

Type strain
- 98-D-690B, CCUG 43067, CIP 106354, M327/99/2, NCTC 13475

Synonyms
- Bisgaardia hudsonenesis

Species of bacterium

Bisgaardia hudsonensis is a Gram-negative and rod-shaped bacterium from the genus of Bisgaardia which has been isolated from the lungs of a dead ringed seal (Phoca hispida) from the Eastern Hudson Bay in Canada and in Scotland.
