= Actinobacillus rossii =

Scientific classification
- Domain: Bacteria
- Kingdom: Pseudomonadati
- Phylum: Pseudomonadota
- Class: Gammaproteobacteria
- Order: Pasteurellales
- Family: Pasteurellaceae
- Genus: Actinobacillus
- Species: A. rossii

Binomial name
- Actinobacillus rossii Sneath and Stevens 1990

Species of bacterium

Actinobacillus rossii is a bacterium. It was first isolated from the vaginas of postparturient sows.
