= Necropsobacter massiliensis =

Scientific classification
- Domain: Bacteria
- Kingdom: Pseudomonadati
- Phylum: Pseudomonadota
- Class: Gammaproteobacteria
- Order: Pasteurellales
- Family: Pasteurellaceae
- Genus: Necropsobacter
- Species: N. massiliensis

Binomial name
- Necropsobacter massiliensis Lo et al. 2015

Type strain
- CSUR P3511, DSM 27814, FF6

Synonyms
- Pasteurella massiliensis

Species of bacterium

Necropsobacter massiliensis is a Gram-negative and non-motile bacterium from the genus of Necropsobacter which has been isolated from a cervical abscess from a Senegalese boy from Dakar in Senegal.
