= Volucribacter psittacicida =

Scientific classification
- Domain: Bacteria
- Kingdom: Pseudomonadati
- Phylum: Pseudomonadota
- Class: Gammaproteobacteria
- Order: Pasteurellales
- Family: Pasteurellaceae
- Genus: Volucribacter
- Species: V. psittacicida

Binomial name
- Volucribacter psittacicida Christensen et al. 2004

Type strain
- CCUG 47536, CIP 108407, DSM 15534, Gerl. 236/81, HIM 698-7/8

Species of bacterium

Volucribacter psittacicida is a gram-negative bacterium from the genus of Volucribacter. Volucribacter psittacicida can cause infections of the respiratory tract, sepsis, diarrhea and inflammation in Psittaciformes.
