= Necropsobacter rosorum =

Scientific classification
- Domain: Bacteria
- Kingdom: Pseudomonadati
- Phylum: Pseudomonadota
- Class: Gammaproteobacteria
- Order: Pasteurellales
- Family: Pasteurellaceae
- Genus: Necropsobacter
- Species: N. rosorum

Binomial name
- Necropsobacter rosorum Christensen et al. 2011

Type strain
- CCM 7802, CCUG 28028, CIP 110147, CCUG 28028

Synonyms
- Pasteurella cf. haemolytica

Species of bacterium

Necropsobacter rosorum is a species of Gram-negative bacteria in the genus Necropsobacter It was first isolated from pneumonic lesions in a guinea pig in Germany. Necropsobacter rosorum can cause bacteremia in rare cases.
