= Wooden tongue =

Wooden tongue may mean:

- Wooden language, a form of obfuscation in French;
- Actinobacillosis, a disease of livestock
