= Pasteurella dagmatis =

Scientific classification
- Domain: Bacteria
- Kingdom: Pseudomonadati
- Phylum: Pseudomonadota
- Class: Gammaproteobacteria
- Order: Pasteurellales
- Family: Pasteurellaceae
- Genus: Pasteurella
- Species: P. dagmatis

Binomial name
- Pasteurella dagmatis Mutters et al. 1985

Species of bacterium

Pasteurella dagmatis is a Gram-negative, nonmotile, penicillin-sensitive coccobacillus from the family Pasteurellaceae. P. dagmatis is oxidase and indole positive. Bacteria from this family cause zoonotic infections in humans. These infections manifest themselves as skin or soft tissue infections after an animal bite. It has been known to cause serious disease in immunocompromised patients.
