= Pasteurella bettyae =

Scientific classification
- Domain: Bacteria
- Kingdom: Pseudomonadati
- Phylum: Pseudomonadota
- Class: Gammaproteobacteria
- Order: Pasteurellales
- Family: Pasteurellaceae
- Genus: Pasteurella
- Species: P. bettyae

Binomial name
- Pasteurella bettyae Sneath and Stevens 1990

Species of bacterium

Pasteurella bettyae is a bacterium associated with human Bartholin gland abscess and finger infections.
