= Pasteurella testudinis =

Scientific classification
- Domain: Bacteria
- Kingdom: Pseudomonadati
- Phylum: Pseudomonadota
- Class: Gammaproteobacteria
- Order: Pasteurellales
- Family: Pasteurellaceae
- Genus: Pasteurella
- Species: P. testudinis

Binomial name
- Pasteurella testudinis Snipes and Biberstein 1982

Species of bacterium

Pasteurella testudinis is a Gram-negative, nonmotile, rod-shaped species of bacteria from the family Pasteurellaceae. Strains of this species were isolated from desert tortoises (Gopherus agassizi).

Pasteurella testudinis may be pathogenic in tortoises. Tortoises with upper respiratory tract disease showed higher levels of P. testudinis than healthy tortoises.
