= Pasteurella langaaensis =

Scientific classification
- Domain: Bacteria
- Kingdom: Pseudomonadati
- Phylum: Pseudomonadota
- Class: Gammaproteobacteria
- Order: Pasteurellales
- Family: Pasteurellaceae
- Genus: Pasteurella
- Species: P. langaaensis

Binomial name
- Pasteurella langaaensis corrig. Mutters et al. 1985

Synonyms
- Alitibacter langaaensis (Mutters et al. 1985) Bisgaard and Christensen 2025; Pasteurella langaa Mutters et al. 1985

Species of bacterium

Pasteurella langaaensis is a Gram-negative, nonmotile, penicillin-sensitive coccobacillus from the family Pasteurellaceae. Bacteria from this family cause zoonotic infections in humans. These infections manifest themselves as skin or soft tissue infections after an animal bite.
