= Bovine respiratory disease =

Disease of cattle

Bovine respiratory disease (BRD) is a disease complex that affects cattle. It includes many respiratory tract infections (RTIs) of different causes, yet similar presentations. As a whole BRD is the most common and economically devastating infectious disease affecting beef cattle in the world. Symptoms can include cough, nasal or ocular discharge, fever and trouble breathing as well as general sickness behavior such as ear droop, decreased appetite, and dull eyes. It causes a potentially pneumonia in calves.

Much like in human RTIs, BRD can be caused by bacteria or viruses; multiple pathogens can also co-infect an animal. The infection is usually a sum of three codependent factors: stress, an underlying viral infection, and a new bacterial infection. Optimal treatment depends on identifying the responsible pathogen, which is not always easy.

The disease manifests itself most often in calves within four weeks of weaning, when calves are sorted into groups of roughly 10–15 in number, and sold to different feedlots via train, tractor trailer, and truck. Because of this, BRD is most commonly referred to as "shipping fever". It is not known whether the stress itself, co-mingling, or travel conditions are at most to blame, and while studies have identified general stressing factors like transport and cold weather conditions, there is still no conclusive evidence on more specific factors (e.g. distance, transport mode, temperature, or temperature volatility). Analogous collections of conditions exist in many other species of feedlot animals like sheep and pigs (and are sometimes caused by the same pathogens) under the names ovine respiratory disease and porcine respiratory disease, but neither is as impactful as BRD is in calves.

== Signs and symptoms ==
BRD often develops within 4 weeks of cattle transport. Symptoms include:

- Spontaneous cough
- Nasal discharge
- Ocular Discharge
- Ear droop
- Rectal temperature > 102.5 °F (39.2 °C)
- Difficulty Breathing
- Coughing
- Decreased appetite
- Dull eyes

== Causes ==
BRD is a "multi-factorial syndrome" that is dependent on a number of different causes. The pathologic condition commonly arises where the causative organism becomes established by secondary infection, following a primary bacterial or viral infection.

=== Pathogens ===
Viruses:

- Bovine herpesvirus 1 (BoHV-1)
- Bovine parainfluenza-3 virus (PI-3)
- Bovine respiratory syncytial virus (BRSV)
- Bovine adenovirus (BAV; the name refers to a specific species of virus, but other ADVs may also contribute)
- Bovine coronavirus (BCV)
- Infectious bovine rhinotracheitis (IBR)
- Various viruses that cause bovine viral diarrhea (BVD)

Bacteria:

- Mannheimia haemolytica
- Pasteurella multocida
- Histophilus somni
- Mycoplasma bovis

=== Triggers ===
There are many stressors that can help induce BRD, the main one being transportation. During transit, cattle are exposed to many factors such as dehydration and exhaustion that can lead to anxiety. Poor ventilation and overcrowding also allow bacteria to spread more easily between the calves.

Fall is the most prominent season for beef cattle, so it is during that time of year when the majority of cattle are grouped together in larger amounts. This increases the risk for BRD along with fluctuations in weather. Studies show that the years with the highest risks for BRD were associated with severe weather environments, rather than average conditions.

== Prevention ==
=== Stress management ===
Stress often serves as the final precursor to BRD. The diseases that make up BRD can persist in a cattle herd for a long period of time before becoming symptomatic, but immune systems weakened by stress can stop controlling the disease. Major sources of stress come from the shipping process and from the co-mingling of cattle. Prior to transportation, electrolytes and vitamins are supplemented to cattle 3–5 days in advance; after transportation, high-quality silage and clean warm water are provided to reduce hunger- and dehydration-related stress.

=== Vaccination ===
Vaccinations exist for several BRD pathogens, but the multitude of possible precursors complicates the process of choosing a vaccine regime. Combination vaccines that target several possible pathogens are commonly sold. Vaccines are not completely effective in stopping the disease, but are merely helpful in mitigation. Many of the problems with vaccine effectiveness rest with improper use, such as failing to time vaccine doses appropriately, or not administering them before shipping.

=== Preventive antibiotics ===
It is sometimes acceptable to preventively dose the entire herd with antibiotics. Parenteral (injected) use is associated with a great reduction in mortality but oral use does not appear as effective.

== Treatment ==
Treatment is supportive with optional use of antibiotics. The affected animals should be fed nutrient-dense food and provided with sufficient electrolytes. As with all animals, they should be kept in an area with good ventilation and stable temperatures.

Feed conversion, weight gain, and the resulting economic return are compromised despite recovery. As a result, prevention should be priotized over treating infected animals.

=== Antibiotics ===
Antibiotics can help combat the bacterial factors of the disease and speed up recovery. They are sometimes used after assuming the existence of bacterial infection. Antibiotics are given orally or in the forms of injections. The Virginia Cooperative Extension recommends the following antibiotics:

- Tilmicosin (Micotil)
- Florfenicol (Nuflor)
- Enrofloxacin (Baytril 100)
- Ceftiofur sodium (Naxcel)
- Ceftiofur hydrochloride (Excenel)
- Spectinomycin sulfate (Adspec)
- Flunixin meeglumine (Banamine)

Antibiotics should not be used too liberally due to the increase in multi-drug resistance in responsible bacteria.

== See also ==
- Pneumonia (non-human)
- Pasteurellosis
