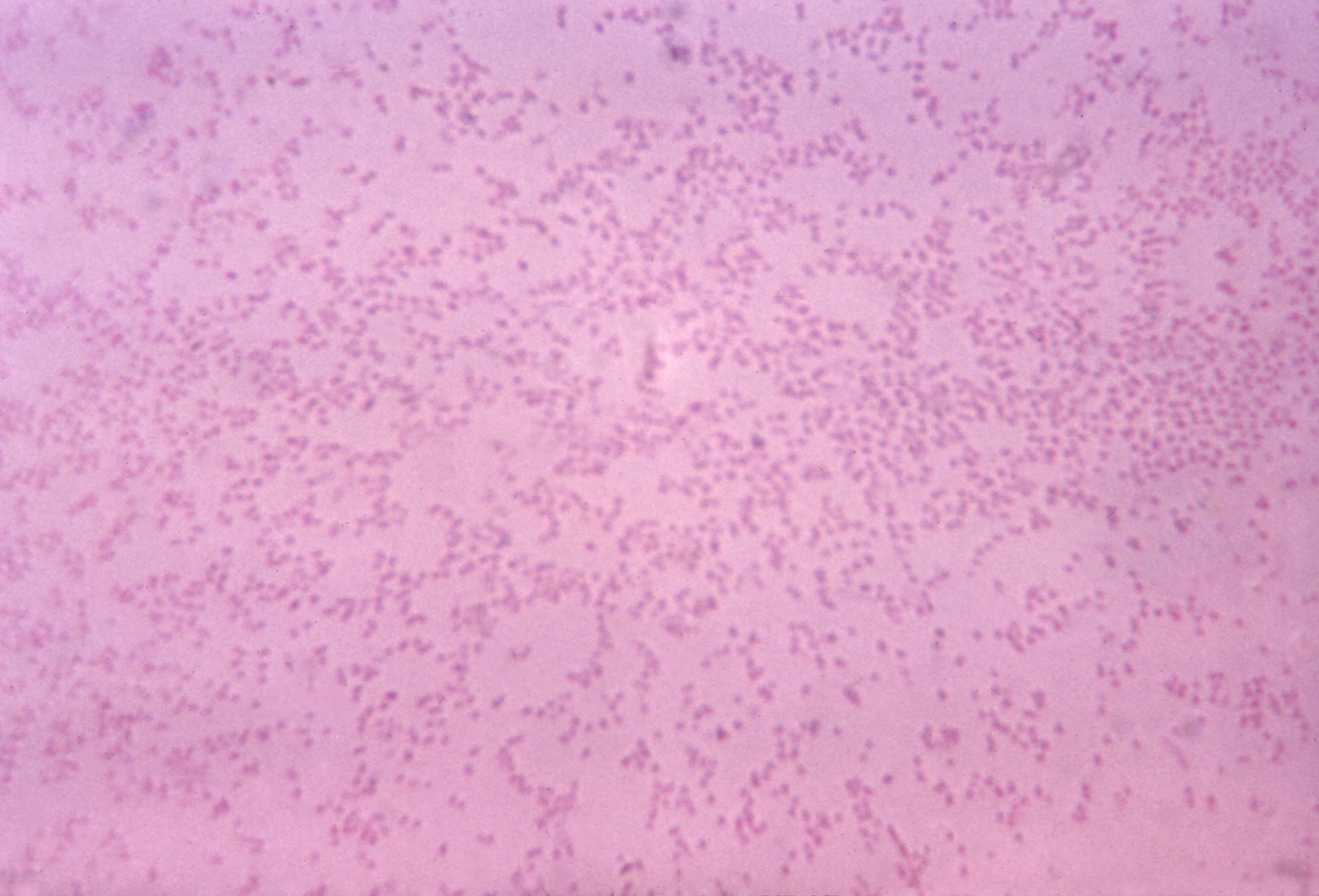
- Gram-stained photomicrograph depicting numerous Pasteurella multocida bacteria

Scientific classification
- Domain: Bacteria
- Kingdom: Pseudomonadati
- Phylum: Pseudomonadota
- Class: Gammaproteobacteria
- Order: Pasteurellales
- Family: Pasteurellaceae
- Genus: Pasteurella
- Species: P. multocida

Binomial name
- Pasteurella multocida Trevisan 1887 (Approved Lists 1980)

= Pasteurella multocida =

Species of bacterium

Pasteurella multocida is a Gram-negative, nonmotile, penicillin-sensitive coccobacillus from the family Pasteurellaceae. P. multocida is the cause of a range of diseases in mammals and birds, including fowl cholera in poultry, atrophic rhinitis in pigs, and bovine hemorrhagic septicemia in cattle and buffalo. It can also cause a zoonotic infection in humans, which typically is a result of bites or scratches from domestic pets. Many mammals (including domestic cats and dogs) and birds harbor it as part of their normal respiratory microbiota, rendering them silent sources of infection.

== History ==
Pasteurella multocida was first found in 1878 in cholera-infected birds. However, it was not isolated until 1880, by Louis Pasteur, in whose honor Pasteurella is named.

== Taxonomy ==
=== Subspecies ===
P. multocida is traditionally divided into three subspecies by biochemical phenotype:

- P. multocida subsp. multocida is defined as dulcitol(-), sorbitol(+).
- P. multocida subsp. septica is defined as dulcitol(-), sorbitol(+).
- P. multocida subsp. gallicida is defined as dulticol(+).

A variant classification replaces the ambiguous Andrades sorbitol growth test with a test for α-glucosidase (α-Glu) activity. It agrees well with single-primer (M13 core) PCR fingerprinting but not so well with the original sorbitol test.

This biochemical classification is generally used for epidemology. The different ability to digest these sugar alcohols may have a meaning in ecology and pathogenesis.

=== Serology ===
Strains of the species are serologically categorized by a combination of two designations: one of five Carter serogroups (A, B, D, E, F) based on the capsule and one of 16 Heddleston serovars (1–16) based on lipopolysaccharide (LPS). To classify a strain serologically, the capsule and the LPS are separately tested using pre-made antibodies. The two results are then written in a combined serotype (e.g. A:2, C:1), for a total of 80 possibilities. (It is also possible for the capsule to not be present, written as "-".)

The chemical structure for A, D, and F capsules are known to be hyaluronic acid, heparin, and chondroitin respectively; group B is known to contain some copolymer of arabinose, mannose, and galactose. The chemical structure for LPS of all 16 serovars are known, as are many types not included in the Heddleston system.

Another indication system is Namioka-Carter, commonly encountered in bovine literature. The capsule classification is the same as Carter's but there are instead 11 somatic "O groups" again supposedly corresponding to the LPS. Results are written with the serovar first, e.g. 6:B and 6:E. Namioka's method for LPS resolution (tube agglutination) is not as powerful as Heddleston's gel diffusion precipitation test but may be easier to perform. There is not a good correspondence between any pair of Namioka and Heddleston numbers, suggesting at least some of the antisera in one of the systems is not as purely descriptive of LPS as originally thought.

=== Molecular typing ===
The genetic locus responsible for the capsular serological variation is known, so "molecular serotyping" (i.e. deducing the serotype by the genotype) has become routine and in the overwhelming majority of cases gives identical results, generally only producing mismatches on novel combinations of mutations. The locus for the LPS is also known, but only six LPS genotypes are defined due to some LPS serovars being produced from very minor genetic change that are hard to differentiate by PCR fingerprinting. They are designated L1 (1, 14), L2 (2, 5), L3 (3, 4), L4 (6), L5 (9), L6 (10, 11, 12, 15), L7 (8, 13), L8 (16), with the parenthezied numbers being the corresponding serovars. Again, the two designations are usually combined: for example, two strains with serotypes A:1 and A:14 should both test as having the genotype A:L1.

Two multilocus sequence typing schemes have been defined, an RIDIC scheme based on fragments of 7 housekeeping genes (adk, est, gdh, mdh, pgi, pmi, g6pd "zwf") originally defined for avian isolates and a multihost scheme based on different fragments of 7 housekeeping genes (adk, aroA, deoD, gdhA, g6pd, mdh, pgi). The former scheme has 365 genotypes (ST1–265, ST for "sequence type") and the latter has 109 (ST1–109); to differentate between those two one usually prefix a designation like "RIRDC ST365", etc. Because the two schemes use overlapping areas, a ST from one scheme usually only corresponds to a handful in another, though no strict conversion table can be made.

MLST can be used in addition to the capsule:LPS genotype as these systems are orthogonal. Because MLST uses housekeeping genes unrelated to virluence, it is not subject to as much selection pressure and tends to more closely show the history of the strains as measured by more intensive whole-genome comparisons.

== Disease ==
Pasteurella multocida causes a range of diseases in wild and domesticated animals, as well as humans. The bacterium is found in birds, cats, dogs, rabbits, cattle, and pigs. In birds, P. multocida causes avian or fowl cholera disease; a significant disease present in commercial and domestic poultry flocks worldwide, particularly layer flocks and parent breeder flocks.

In most species the majority of infections are caused by a handful of serotypes, partly explained by the fact that the two molecules used for serotype classification are also the host's immune system's "first impression" of this bacterium. However, capsule and LPS are only two of the bacterium's virulence factors with a role in host selection, and two strains of the same cap:LPS genotype may actually turn out quite different when examined using MLST or whole-genome comparison.

=== Avians ===
P. multocida strains that cause fowl cholera in poultry typically belong to the serovars 1, 3, and 4. In the wild, fowl cholera has been shown to follow bird migration routes, especially of snow geese. The P. multocida serotype-1 is most associated with avian cholera in North America, but the bacterium does not linger in wetlands for extended periods of time.

=== Mammals ===
P. multocida causes atrophic rhinitis in pigs; it also can cause pneumonia or bovine respiratory disease in cattle. It may be responsible for mass mortality in saiga antelopes.

==== Humans ====
In humans, P. multocida is the most common cause of wound infections after dog or cat bites. The infection usually shows as soft tissue inflammation within 24 hours. High leukocyte and neutrophil counts are typically observed, leading to an inflammatory reaction at the infection site (generally a diffuse, localized cellulitis). It can also infect other locales, such as the respiratory tract, and is known to cause regional lymphadenopathy (swelling of the lymph nodes). In more serious cases, a bacteremia can result, causing an osteomyelitis or endocarditis. Patients with a joint replacement (perhaps notably knee replacement) in place may, in particular, be at risk of secondary infection of that joint during an episode of P multocida cellulitis/bacteraemia. The bacteria may also cross the blood–brain barrier and cause meningitis.

== Virulence ==
Pasteurella. multocida expresses a range of virulence factors including a polysaccharide capsule and the variable carbohydrate surface molecule, lipopolysaccharide (LPS). The capsule has been shown in strains of serogroups A and B to help resist phagocytosis by host immune cells and capsule type A has also been shown to help resist complement-mediated lysis. The LPS produced by P. multocida consists of a hydrophobic lipid A molecule (that anchors the LPS to the outer membrane), an inner core, and an outer core, both consisting of a series of sugars linked in a specific way. There is no O-antigen on the LPS and the molecule is similar to LPS produced by Haemophilus influenzae and the lipooligosaccharide of Neisseria meningitidis. A study in a serovar 1 strain showed that a full-length LPS molecule was essential for the bacteria to be fully virulent in chickens.

Strains that cause atrophic rhinitis in pigs are unique as they also have P. multocida toxin (PMT) residing on a bacteriophage. PMT is responsible for the twisted snouts observed in pigs infected with the bacteria. This toxin activates Rho GTPases, which bind and hydrolyze GTP, and are important in actin stress fiber formation. Formation of stress fibers may aid in the endocytosis of P. multocida. The host cell cycle is also modulated by the toxin, which can act as an intracellular mitogen.

P. multocida has been observed invading and replicating inside host amoebae, causing lysis in the host.

== Growth characteristics ==
P. multocida will grow at 37 °C (99 °F) on blood or chocolate agar, HS agar, but will not grow on MacConkey agar. Colony growth is accompanied by a characteristic "mousy" odor due to metabolic products.

A facultative anaerobe, P. multocida it is oxidase-positive and catalase-positive. It can also ferment a large number of carbohydrates in anaerobic conditions. The survival of P. multocida bacteria has also been shown to be increased by the addition of salt into their environments. Levels of sucrose and pH also have been shown to have minor effects on bacterial survival.

== Diagnosis and treatment ==
Diagnosis of the bacterium in humans was traditionally based on clinical findings, and culture and serological testing, but false negatives have been a problem due to easy death of P. multocida, and serology cannot differentiate between current infection and previous exposure. The quickest and most accurate method for confirming an active P. multocida infection is molecular detection using polymerase chain reaction.

This bacterium can be effectively treated with β-lactam antibiotics, which inhibit cell wall synthesis. It can also be treated with fluoroquinolones or tetracyclines; fluoroquinolones inhibit bacterial DNA synthesis and tetracyclines interfere with protein synthesis by binding to the bacterial 30S ribosomal subunit. Despite poor in vitro susceptibility results, macrolides (binding to the ribosome) also can be applied, certainly in the case of pulmonary complications. Due to the polymicrobial etiology of P. multocida infections, treatment requires the use of antimicrobials targeted at the elimination of both aerobic and anaerobic, Gram-negative bacteria. As a result, amoxicillin-clavulanate (a beta-lactamase inhibitor/penicillin combination) is seen as the treatment of choice.

== Prevention ==
No vaccine is available for humans. If skin is broken by an animal bite, risks of infection can be reduced by thoroughly cleaning the wound, disinfection, and dressing. The wound should not be closed (e.g. by suture) unless necessary as doing so increases the risk of infection. Prophylactic antibiotics may be considered in immunocompromised people, but is not routinely recommended otherwise.

=== Vaccination ===
Vaccines are available for livestock. The traditional inactivated vaccines tend to provide a short protective duration and only occasionally provides cross-protection. Many of the live attenuated vaccines provide cross-protection against infection of the same capsular serogroup or LPS serovar. Future subunits, peptide, and DNA vaccines can potentially confer immunity against more broadly shared parts of the bacterium such as a specific outer membrane protein or a secreted toxin.

==== Ruminants ====
Haemorrhagic septicaemia (B:2, E:2; 6:B, 6:E in Namioka) vaccines are available for cattle in three inactivated forms: whole-cell bacterins, alum-precipitated vaccine (APV), and oil-adjuvant vaccine (OAV). An intranasal live attenuated B:3,4 vaccine (strain from a fallow deer) is recommended for cattle and waterbuffalo in Asia.

A formalin-killed vaccine of whole0-broth-cultured type D:4 is used in Ethiopia. Widely used for sheep and goats, it provides protection from local A and D strains.

==== Non-ruminant vaccines ====
Approved pig vaccines for atrophic rhinitis target the dermonecrotic toxin using a genetically (recombinant) or chemically (toxoid) detoxified version; some are combined with whole killed Bordetella bronchiseptica.

An A:3 rabbit vaccine exists.

=== Birds ===
A live avirulent A:3,4 vaccine that cross-protects against A:1 and A:3 is approved for chickens and turkeys. There is also a live attenuated candidate for ducks.

Some work have gone into producing a similarly immunogenic but (expected to be) much cheaper inactivated vaccine for chickens.

A subunit vaccine targeting conserved siderophore receptor and porin (SRP) proteins has been approved for chickens.

== Current research ==
=== Requirements for growth ===
Pasteurella multocida mutants are being researched for their ability to cause diseases, mainly by knocking out genes to see what has changed. In vitro experiments show the bacteria respond to low iron.

Other research is being done on the effects of protein, pH, temperature, sodium chloride (NaCl), and sucrose on P. multocida development and survival in water. The research seems to show the bacteria survive better in 18 °C (64 °F) water compared to 2 °C (36 °F) water. The addition of 0.5% NaCl also aided bacterial survival, while the sucrose and pH levels had minor effects, as well.

Research has also been done on the response of P. multocida to the host environment. These tests use DNA microarrays and proteomics techniques. P. multocida-directed mutants have been tested for their ability to produce disease. Findings seem to indicate the bacteria occupy host niches that force them to change their gene expression for energy metabolism, uptake of iron, amino acids, and other nutrients. In vitro experiments show the responses of the bacteria to low iron and different iron sources, such as transferrin and hemoglobin. P. multocida genes that are upregulated in times of infection are usually involved in nutrient uptake and metabolism. This shows true virulence genes may only be expressed during the early stages of infection.

=== Genetics ===
Genetic transformation is the process by which a recipient bacterial cell takes up DNA from a neighboring cell and integrates this DNA into the recipient's genome. P. multocida DNA contains high frequencies of putative DNA uptake sequences (DUSs) identical to those in Hemophilus influenzae that promote donor DNA uptake during transformation. The location of these sequences in P. multocida shows a skewed distribution towards genome maintenance genes, such as those involved in DNA repair. This finding suggests that P. multocida might be competent to undergo transformation under certain conditions, and that genome maintenance genes involved in transforming donor DNA may preferentially replace their damaged counterparts in the DNA of the recipient cell.

Hemophilus influenzae diverged from P. multocida about 270±135 million years ago.

=== Vaccine ===
Vaccination against progressive atrophic rhinitis was developed by using a recombinant derivative of P. multocida toxin. The vaccination was tested on pregnant gilts (female swine without previous litters). The piglets born to treated gilts were inoculated, while the piglets born to unvaccinated mothers developed atrophic rhinitis.
