= Otariodibacter =

Scientific classification
- Domain: Bacteria
- Kingdom: Pseudomonadati
- Phylum: Pseudomonadota
- Class: Gammaproteobacteria
- Order: Pasteurellales
- Family: Pasteurellaceae
- Genus: Otariodibacter; Hansen et al. 2012
- Species: O. oris

Binomial name
- Otariodibacter oris Hansen et al. 2012

Type strain
- DSM 23800

Genus of bacteria

Otariodibacter is a genus of bacteria from the class of Pasteurellaceae with one known species (Otariodibacter oris). Otariodibacter oris has been isolated from an oral swab from a Californian sea lion from the Copenhagen Zoo in Denmark in 2007.

== Etymology ==
The binomial name Otariodibacter oris is derived from:

- Otario-, referring to the marine mammal family Otariidae (eared seals such as sea lions),
- -di-, meaning “from” or “of”,
- -bacter, from Greek *baktērion*, meaning “small rod”.

The species epithet oris is derived from Latin *os, oris*, meaning "mouth", referring to the site of isolation.

Thus, the full name means "rod-shaped bacterium from the mouth of an otariid (sea lion)."

== Characteristics ==
Otariodibacter oris exhibits the following traits:

- Gram-negative
- Rod-shaped
- Non-motile
- Facultatively anaerobic

It is positive for both catalase and oxidase activity. The bacterium grows on blood agar under aerobic and microaerophilic conditions.

== Habitat ==
Otariodibacter oris was isolated from an oral swab of a captive Californian sea lion (Zalophus californianus). It is presumed to be a commensal species within the oral microbiome of marine mammals.

== Type strain ==
The type strain of Otariodibacter oris is:

- DSM 23800
- Also referred to as strain T-1
- Deposited in the Deutsche Sammlung von Mikroorganismen und Zellkulturen (DSMZ)
