= Phocoenobacter =

Scientific classification
- Domain: Bacteria
- Kingdom: Pseudomonadati
- Phylum: Pseudomonadota
- Class: Gammaproteobacteria
- Order: Pasteurellales
- Family: Pasteurellaceae
- Genus: Phocoenobacter; Foster et al. 2000

Type species
- Phocoenobacter uteri

Species
- P. atlanticus P. uteri

Genus of bacteria

Phocoenobacter is a Gram-negative and rod-shaped genus of bacteria from the family of Pasteurellaceae with two known species, the type species, Phocoenobacter uteri and Phocoenobacter atlanticus. Phocoenobacter uteri has been isolated from the uterus of a harbour porpoise (Phocoena phocoena) from Inverness in Scotland.
