= Testudinibacter =

Scientific classification
- Domain: Bacteria
- Kingdom: Pseudomonadati
- Phylum: Pseudomonadota
- Class: Gammaproteobacteria
- Order: Pasteurellales
- Family: Pasteurellaceae
- Genus: Testudinibacter; Hansen et al. 2016

Type species
- Testudinibacter aquarius

Species
- T. aquarius

Genus of bacteria

Testudinibacter is a genus of bacteria from the family of Pasteurellaceae with one known species (Testudinibacter aquarius). Testudinibacter aquarius has been isolated from the oral cavity of a turtle (Chelodina longicollis) from Randers in Denmark.
