= Frederiksenia =

Scientific classification
- Domain: Bacteria
- Kingdom: Pseudomonadati
- Phylum: Pseudomonadota
- Class: Gammaproteobacteria
- Order: Pasteurellales
- Family: Pasteurellaceae
- Genus: Frederiksenia; Korczak et al. 2014

Type species
- Frederiksenia canicola

Species
- F. canicola

Genus of bacteria

Frederiksenia is a genus of gram-negative bacteria from the family of Pasteurellaceae with one known species (Frederiksenia canicola). Frederiksenia canicola has been isolated from the pharynx of a dog.
