= Muribacter =

Scientific classification
- Domain: Bacteria
- Kingdom: Pseudomonadati
- Phylum: Pseudomonadota
- Class: Gammaproteobacteria
- Order: Pasteurellales
- Family: Pasteurellaceae
- Genus: Muribacter; Nicklas et al. 2015

Type species
- Muribacter muris

Species
- M. muris

Genus of bacteria

Muribacter is a genus of gram-negative bacteria from the class of Pasteurellaceae with one known species (Muribacter muris). Muribacter muris has been isolated from a mouse.
