= Ursidibacter =

Scientific classification
- Domain: Bacteria
- Kingdom: Pseudomonadati
- Phylum: Pseudomonadota
- Class: Gammaproteobacteria
- Order: Pasteurellales
- Family: Pasteurellaceae
- Genus: Ursidibacter; Johanne et al. 2015

Type species
- Ursidibacter maritimus

Species
- U. arcticus U. maritimus

Genus of bacteria

Ursidibacter is a genus of gram-negative bacteria from the class of Pasteurellaceae.
