= Chelonobacter =

Scientific classification
- Domain: Bacteria
- Kingdom: Pseudomonadati
- Phylum: Pseudomonadota
- Class: Gammaproteobacteria
- Order: Pasteurellales
- Family: Pasteurellaceae
- Genus: Chelonobacter; Gregersen et al. 2009

Type species
- Chelonobacter oris

Species
- C. oris

Genus of bacteria

Chelonobacter is a genus of gram-negative bacteria from the family of Pasteurellaceae with one known species (Chelonobacter oris). Chelonobacter oris is associated with diseases of the respiratory tract of Hermann's tortoise (Testudo hermanni).
