= Nicoletella =

Scientific classification
- Domain: Bacteria
- Kingdom: Pseudomonadati
- Phylum: Pseudomonadota
- Class: Gammaproteobacteria
- Order: Pasteurellales
- Family: Pasteurellaceae
- Genus: Nicoletella; Kuhnert et al. 2005

Type species
- Nicoletella semolina

Species
- N. semolina

Genus of bacteria

Nicoletella is a Gram-negative and non-motile genus of bacteria from the family of Pasteurellaceae with one known species (Nicoletella semolina). Nicoletella semolina has been isolated from the trachea of a horse from Bern in Switzerland.
