= Necropsobacter =

Scientific classification
- Domain: Bacteria
- Kingdom: Pseudomonadati
- Phylum: Pseudomonadota
- Class: Gammaproteobacteria
- Order: Pasteurellales
- Family: Pasteurellaceae
- Genus: Necropsobacter; Christensen et al. 2011

Type species
- Necropsobacter rosorum

Species
- N. massiliensis N. rosorum

Genus of bacteria

Necropsobacter is a Gram-negative and non-motile genus of bacteria from the family of Pasteurellaceae.
