= Mesocricetibacter =

Scientific classification
- Domain: Bacteria
- Kingdom: Pseudomonadati
- Phylum: Pseudomonadota
- Class: Gammaproteobacteria
- Order: Pasteurellales
- Family: Pasteurellaceae
- Genus: Mesocricetibacter; Christensen et al. 2014

Type species
- Mesocricetibacter intestinalis

Species
- M. intestinalis

Genus of bacteria

Mesocricetibacter is a genus of gram-negative bacteria from the family of Pasteurellaceae with one known species (Mesocricetibacter intestinalis). Mesocricetibacter intestinalis has been isolated from the caecitis of the hamster (Mesocricetus auratus).
