= Caviibacterium =

Scientific classification
- Domain: Bacteria
- Kingdom: Pseudomonadati
- Phylum: Pseudomonadota
- Class: Gammaproteobacteria
- Order: Pasteurellales
- Family: Pasteurellaceae
- Genus: Caviibacterium; Adhikary et al. 2018

Type species
- Caviibacterium pharyngocola

Species
- C. pharyngocola

Genus of bacteria

Caviibacterium is a genus of gram-negative bacteria from the class of Pasteurellaceae with one known species (Caviibacterium pharyngocola).
