= Bibersteinia =

Scientific classification
- Domain: Bacteria
- Kingdom: Pseudomonadati
- Phylum: Pseudomonadota
- Class: Gammaproteobacteria
- Order: Pasteurellales
- Family: Pasteurellaceae
- Genus: Bibersteinia; Blackall et al. 2007

Type species
- Bibersteinia trehalosi

Species
- B. trehalosi

Genus of bacteria

Bibersteinia is a Gram-negative and non-motile, genus of bacteria from the family Pasteurellaceae with one known species (Bibersteinia trehalosi). Bibersteinia is named after Ernst L. Biberstein. Bibersteinia trehalosi is a pathogen of sheep and can cause systemic infections in sheep.
