= Cricetibacter =

Scientific classification
- Domain: Bacteria
- Kingdom: Pseudomonadati
- Phylum: Pseudomonadota
- Class: Gammaproteobacteria
- Order: Pasteurellales
- Family: Pasteurellaceae
- Genus: Cricetibacter; Christensen et al. 2014

Type species
- Cricetibacter osteomyelitidis

Species
- C. osteomyelitidis

Genus of bacteria

Cricetibacter is a genus of gram-negative bacteria from the family of Pasteurellaceae with one known species (Cricetibacter osteomyelitidis). Cricetibacter osteomyelitidis has been isolated from a European hamster (Cricetus cricetus) with osteomyelitis.
