= Mergibacter =

Scientific classification
- Domain: Bacteria
- Kingdom: Pseudomonadati
- Phylum: Pseudomonadota
- Class: Gammaproteobacteria
- Order: Pasteurellales
- Family: Pasteurellaceae
- Genus: Mergibacter; De Luca et al. 2022

Type species
- Mergibacter septicus

Species
- M. septicus

Genus of bacteria

Mergibacter is a genus of Gram-negative, rod-shaped bacteria from the class of Pasteurellaceae with one known species (Mergibacter septicus). The type species, M. septicus, was originally isolated from seabirds in Florida, specifically the common tern. It was originally known as Bisgaard Taxon 40 before further testing led to the creation of the novel genus and species. M. septicus was subsequently isolated from a seabird in Germany.

The genus is named from the Latin word mergus, which means "seabird". The lone species, M. septicus, is so named because it was isolated from an outbreak of sepsis in seabirds.

M. septicus grows on sheep's blood agar, but not MacConkey agar. It grows aerobically at 28 °C, 37 °C 42 °C. The bacteria are β-hemolytic, are positive for oxidase and catalase, and negative for urease and indole.
