= Vespertiliibacter =

Scientific classification
- Domain: Bacteria
- Kingdom: Pseudomonadati
- Phylum: Pseudomonadota
- Class: Gammaproteobacteria
- Order: Pasteurellales
- Family: Pasteurellaceae
- Genus: Vespertiliibacter; Mühldorfer et al. 2014

Type species
- Vespertiliibacter pulmonis

Species
- V. pulmonis

Genus of bacteria

Vespertiliibacter is a genus of bacteria from the class of Pasteurellaceae with one known species (Vespertiliibacter pulmonis). Vespertiliibacter pulmonis has been isolated from the lung of a bat (Nyctalus noctula) from Berlin in Germany.
