= Succinic acid fermentation =

Microbial production of succinic acid can be performed with wild bacteria like Actinobacillus succinogenes, Mannheimia succiniciproducens and Anaerobiospirillum succiniciproducens or genetically modified Escherichia coli, Corynebacterium glutamicum and Saccharomyces cerevisiae. Understanding of the central carbon metabolism of these organisms is crucial in determining the maximum obtainable yield of succinic acid on the carbon source employed as substrate.

== Metabolic pathways ==
Neglecting the carbon utilised for biomass formation (known to be a small fraction of the total carbon utilised) basic biochemistry balances can be performed based on the established metabolic pathways of these organisms. Using glucose as substrate the natural producing succinic acid producers are first considered. These organisms use the excretion of acetic acid (and sometimes formic acid) to balance the NADH requirement of succinic acid production. Two possible paths exist as indicated in Figure 1 and Figure 2. The difference between the two pathways lies in the pyruvate oxidation step where pyruvate formate lyase is employed in Figure 1 and pyruvate dehydrogenase employed in Figure 2. The additional NADH generated in Figure 2 results in 66% of the molar glucose flux ending up as succinic acid compared to the 50% of Figure 1. The overall yields can be expressed on a mass basis where the pathway in Figure 1 results in a 0.66 gram succinic acid per gram of glucose consumed (g/g). The pathway in Figure 2 results in a yield of 0.87 g/g.

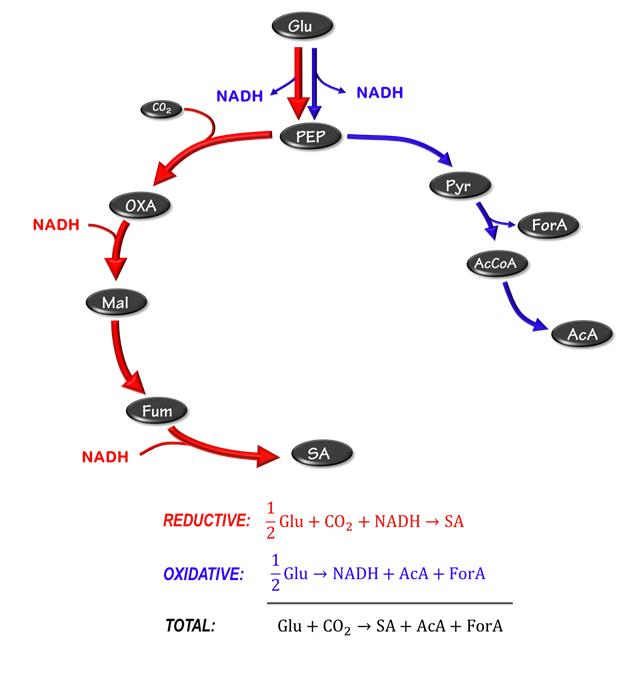
Figure 1: Metabolic pathway for producing succinic acid. NADH balance is achieved by acetic and formic acid production. Pyruvate oxidation via the formate lyase route.

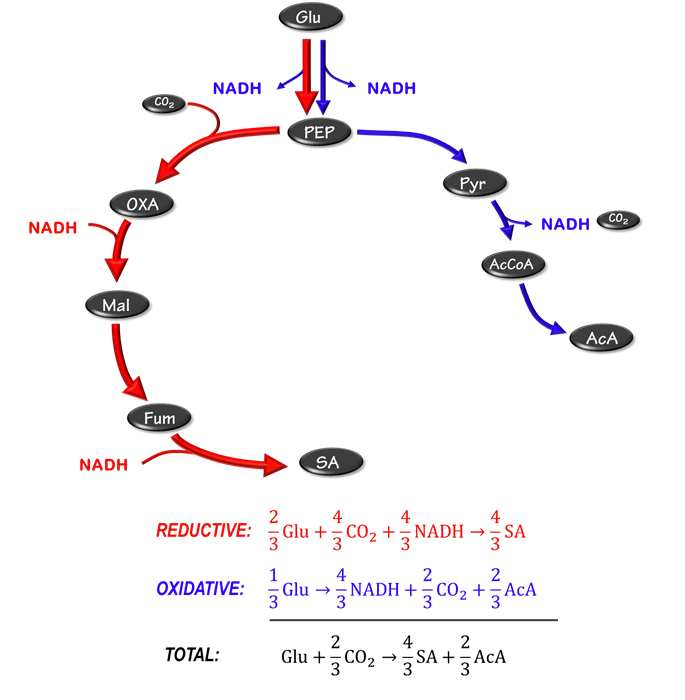
Figure 2: Metabolic pathway for producing succinic acid. NADH balance is achieved by acetic acid production. Pyruvate oxidation via the pyruvate dehydrogenase route.

The metabolic pathway can be genetically engineered in order to have succinic acid as the only excretion product. This can be achieved by using the oxidative section of the tricarboxylic acid cycle (TCA) under anaerobic conditions as illustrated in Figure 3. Alternatively the glyoxylate bypass can be utilised (Figure 4) to give the same result. For both these scenarios the mass based succinic acid yield is 1.12 g/g. This implies that the theoretical maximum yield is such that more succinic acid is formed than glucose consumed due to the fixation of carbon dioxide.

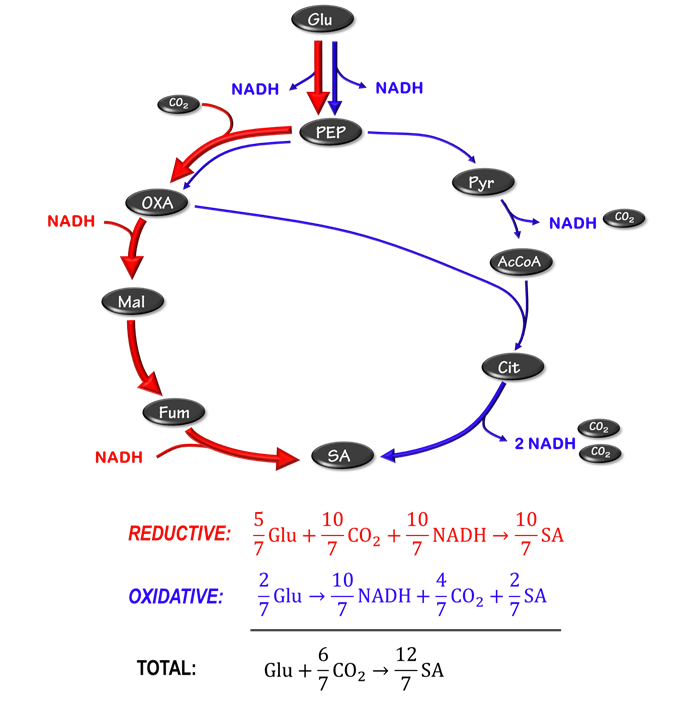
Figure 3: Metabolic pathway for producing succinic acid without byproducts. NADH balance is achieved by oxidative TCA branch.

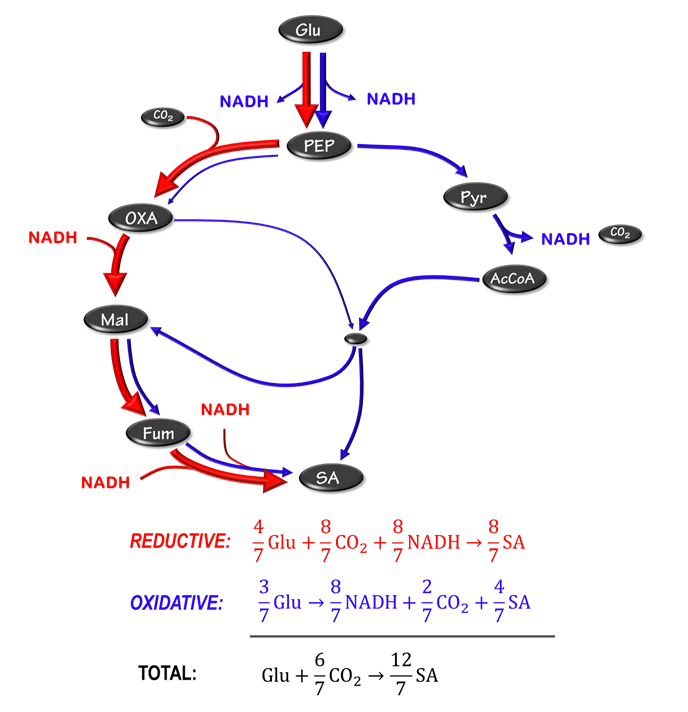
Figure 4: Metabolic pathway for producing succinic acid without byproducts. NADH balance is achieved by oxidative glyoxylate cycle.
