= Gallibacterium =

Scientific classification
- Domain: Bacteria
- Kingdom: Pseudomonadati
- Phylum: Pseudomonadota
- Class: Gammaproteobacteria
- Order: Pasteurellales
- Family: Pasteurellaceae
- Genus: Gallibacterium; Christensen et al. 2003

Type species
- Gallibacterium anatis

Species
- G. anatis G. melopsittaci G. salpingitidis G. trehalosifermentans

Synonyms
- Salpingitia, Pasteurella haemolytica complex

Genus of bacteria

Gallibacterium is a genus of gram-negative bacteria from the family of Pasteurellaceae. Gallibacterium bacteria are pathogens for chicken.
