= Seminibacterium =

Scientific classification
- Domain: Bacteria
- Kingdom: Pseudomonadati
- Phylum: Pseudomonadota
- Class: Gammaproteobacteria
- Order: Pasteurellales
- Family: Pasteurellaceae
- Genus: Seminibacterium; Vela et al. 2015

Type species
- Seminibacterium arietis

Species
- S. arietis

Genus of bacteria

Seminibacterium is a Gram-negative genus of bacteria from the family of Pasteurellaceae with one known species (Seminibacterium arietis). Seminibacterium arietis has been isolated from the semen of a ram.
