= Bisgaardia =

Scientific classification
- Domain: Bacteria
- Kingdom: Pseudomonadati
- Phylum: Pseudomonadota
- Class: Gammaproteobacteria
- Order: Pasteurellales
- Family: Pasteurellaceae
- Genus: Bisgaardia; Foster et al. 2011

Type species
- Bisgaardia hudsonensis

Species
- Bisgaardia hudsonensis Bisgaardia miroungae

Genus of bacteria

Bisgaardia is a genus of gram-negative bacteria from the family Pasteurellaceae.
