= Bisgaardia miroungae =

Scientific classification
- Domain: Bacteria
- Kingdom: Pseudomonadati
- Phylum: Pseudomonadota
- Class: Gammaproteobacteria
- Order: Pasteurellales
- Family: Pasteurellaceae
- Genus: Bisgaardia
- Species: B. miroungae

Binomial name
- Bisgaardia miroungae Hansen et al. 2015

Type strain
- CCUG 65148, DSM 28141, strain Wildatric

Species of bacterium

Bisgaardia miroungae is a gram-negative bacterial species which was originally isolated from the oral cavity of an elephant seal (Mirounga angustirostris) from the Marine Mammal Center in the United States in 2011.
