= Conservatibacter =

Scientific classification
- Domain: Bacteria
- Kingdom: Pseudomonadati
- Phylum: Pseudomonadota
- Class: Gammaproteobacteria
- Order: Pasteurellales
- Family: Pasteurellaceae
- Genus: Conservatibacter; Adhikary et al. 2018

Type species
- Conservatibacter flavescens

Species
- C. flavescens

Genus of bacteria

Conservatibacter is a genus of gram-negative bacteria from the family of Pasteurellaceae with one known species (Conservatibacter flavescens).
