= Volucribacter =

Scientific classification
- Domain: Bacteria
- Kingdom: Pseudomonadati
- Phylum: Pseudomonadota
- Class: Gammaproteobacteria
- Order: Pasteurellales
- Family: Pasteurellaceae
- Genus: Volucribacter; Christensen et al. 2004

Type species
- Volucribacter psittacicida

Species
- V. amazonae V. psittacicida

Genus of bacteria

Volucribacter is a genus of gram-negative bacteria from the class of Pasteurellaceae. Volucribacter are pathogens in birds.
