= Actinobacillosis =

- Specialty: Infectious disease

Actinobacillosis is a zoonotic disease caused by Actinobacillus. It is more commonly associated with animals than with humans.

One of the most common forms seen by veterinarians is mouth actinobacillosis of cattle, due to Actinobacillus lignieresii. The most prominent symptom is the swelling of the tongue that protrudes from the mouth and is very hard at palpation ("wooden tongue").

Actinobacillus suis is an important disease of pigs of all ages and can lead to severe morbidity and sudden death.

== Causes ==
The infection is most commonly caused by abrasions on different soft tissues through which the bacteria, Actinobacillus lignieresii, enters. These soft tissues include subcutaneous tissues, the tongue, lymph nodes, lungs, and various tissues in the gastrointestinal tract. The injury results in different forms and locations of the disease depending on the location of the tissue. The commensal bacteria is also commonly found in the oral cavity, gastrointestinal tract, and reproductive tract, sometimes resulting in disease. There are generally one or two cases of actinobacillosis per herd found in adult cows, foals or adult horses, and other similar animals.

== Differential diagnosis ==
Mouth actinobacillosis of cattle must be differentiated from actinomycosis that affects bone tissues of the maxilla.

== Treatment ==
When only the mouth is involved, actinobacillosis in cattle and other ruminants can frequently be treated with intravenous administration of sodium iodide. In more severe cases, or instances in which the animal either does not respond to sodium iodide or begins to develop signs of toxicity to it, antibiotics may be used instead. Surgical debridement or debulking of affected tissues may be required if the airway becomes obstructed. Antibiotics are the primary course of treatment for pigs and horses affected by the disease.

== See also ==
- actinomycosis
- Actinobacillus suis
