= Gallibacterium anatis =

Scientific classification
- Domain: Bacteria
- Kingdom: Pseudomonadati
- Phylum: Pseudomonadota
- Class: Gammaproteobacteria
- Order: Pasteurellales
- Family: Pasteurellaceae
- Genus: Gallibacterium
- Species: G. anatis

Binomial name
- Gallibacterium anatis (Mutters et al., 1985)

Synonyms
- Pasteurella anatis

Species of bacterium

Gallibacterium anatis, formerly Pasteurella anatis, is a Gram-negative, nonmotile, penicillin-sensitive coccobacillus in the family Pasteurellaceae.

Members of this family can cause zoonotic infections in humans, typically manifesting as skin or soft tissue infections following animal bites. G. anatis is primarily found in chickens.

Infected chickens may exhibit sinusitis, nasal discharge, a drop in egg production, and low mortality.

== Vaccination ==
Vaccines for chickens have been developed using bacterial outer membrane vesicles purified by hydrostatic filtration dialysis. Several of these have successfully produced immunity in domestic chickens. Antenucci et al. (2020) demonstrated the most consistent product and effective immune provocation among HFD OMV processes, but overall HFD has yet to prove itself against other vaccine production techniques. Nonetheless, it is a promising line of research as of 2021.
