= Tilmicosin =

Names
- IUPAC name [(2R,3R,4E,6E,9R,11R,12S,13S,14R)-12-{[3,6-Dideoxy-3-(dimethylamino)-β-D-glucopyranosyl]oxy}-11-{2-[(3R,5S)-3,5-dimethylpiperidin-1-yl]ethyl}-2-ethyl-14-hydroxy-5,9,13-trimethyl-8,16-dioxooxacyclohexadeca-4,6-dien-3-yl]methyl 6-deoxy-2,3-di-O-methyl-β-D-allopyranoside
- Other names Micotil; 20-Deoxy-20-(3,5-dimethylpiperidin-1-yl)-desmycosin

Identifiers
CAS Number	108050-54-0
3D model (JSmol)	Interactive image
ChEBI	CHEBI:195409
ChEMBL	ChEMBL206342
ChemSpider	4445656
ECHA InfoCard	100.167.324
PubChem CID	5282521
UNII	XL4103X2E3
CompTox Dashboard (EPA)	DTXSID5046011
- InChI: InChI=1S/C46H80N2O13/c1-13-36-33(24-57-46-44(56-12)43(55-11)40(53)31(8)59-46)19-25(2)14-15-34(49)28(5)20-32(16-17-48-22-26(3)18-27(4)23-48)42(29(6)35(50)21-37(51)60-36)61-45-41(54)38(47(9)10)39(52)30(7)58-45/h14-15,19,26-33,35-36,38-46,50,52-54H,13,16-18,20-24H2,1-12H3/b15-14+,25-19+/t26-,27+,28-,29+,30-,31-,32+,33-,35-,36-,38+,39-,40-,41-,42-,43-,44-,45+,46-/m1/s1 Key: JTSDBFGMPLKDCD-XVFHVFLVSA-N; InChI=1/C46H80N2O13/c1-13-36-33(24-57-46-44(56-12)43(55-11)40(53)31(8)59-46)19-25(2)14-15-34(49)28(5)20-32(16-17-48-22-26(3)18-27(4)23-48)42(29(6)35(50)21-37(51)60-36)61-45-41(54)38(47(9)10)39(52)30(7)58-45/h14-15,19,26-33,35-36,38-46,50,52-54H,13,16-18,20-24H2,1-12H3/b15-14+,25-19+/t26-,27+,28-,29+,30-,31-,32+,33-,35-,36-,38+,39-,40-,41-,42-,43-,44-,45+,46-/m1/s1 Key: JTSDBFGMPLKDCD-XVFHVFLVBD
- SMILES: O=C4\C=C\C(=C\[C@H](CO[C@@H]1O[C@H](C)[C@@H](O)[C@@H](OC)[C@H]1OC)[C@H](OC(=O)C[C@@H](O)[C@@H]([C@@H](O[C@@H]2O[C@@H]([C@@H](O)[C@H](N(C)C)[C@H]2O)C)[C@@H](CCN3C[C@H](C)C[C@H](C)C3)C[C@H]4C)C)CC)C

Properties
Chemical formula	C_{46}H_{80}N_{2}O_{13}
Molar mass	869.147 g·mol^{−1}
Solubility in water	566 mg/mL

Pharmacology
ATCvet code	QJ01FA91 (WHO)
Legal status	CA: ℞-only
- Except where otherwise noted, data are given for materials in their standard state (at 25 °C [77 °F], 100 kPa). Infobox references

Tilmicosin is a macrolide antibiotic. It is distributed under the brand name Micotil. It is used in veterinary medicine for the treatment of bovine respiratory disease and enzootic pneumonia caused by Mannheimia (Pasteurella) haemolytica in sheep. In humans, Tilmicosin causes fatal cardiotoxic effects at amounts greater than 1 milliliter when injected, something most commonly seen in veterinary personnel and farmers with accidental exposure to the drug. Tilmicosin, like most macrolides, is a Calcium channel blocker. However, because Micotil is formulated for animals like cows, it has exceptionally more potent Ca channel blocking effects in humans with a dose of .5 mL causing significant poisoning and a dose of 5-6 ml being lethal.
