= Ferment (TV program) =

Canadian television program

- Genre: Religious current affairs
- Presented by: Kenneth Bagnall
- Country of origin: Canada
- Original language: English
- No. of seasons: 1
- No. of episodes: 4

Production
- Producer: Vincent Tovell
- Running time: 30 minutes

Original release
- Network: CBC Television
- Release: 31 May – 21 June 1965

Ferment is a Canadian religious current affairs television program that aired on CBC Television in 1965.

== Premise ==
This program provided an overview of recent developments in the Christian church, hosted by the United Church Observer's assistant editor Kenneth Bagnall.

"Peace and Brotherhood", the first episode, concerned such topics as civil rights, nuclear warfare and the church in Quebec. The second episode's theme was a "new Protestant reformation" with guests Paul Tillich and John A. T. Robinson. Personal Christian beliefs was the theme of episode three. The final programme speculated on the church's future, particularly in the suburban area of Canada, the United States and the United Kingdom.

== Scheduling ==
This half-hour program was broadcast on Mondays at 10:00 p.m. (Eastern) from 31 May to 21 June 1965.
