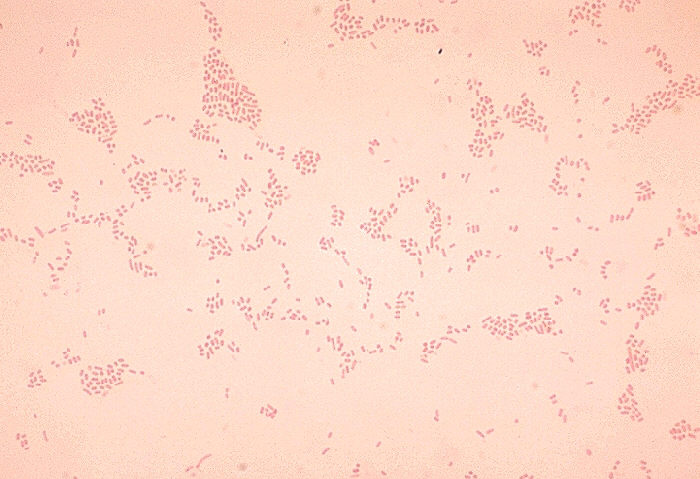
- Actinobacillus suis

Scientific classification
- Domain: Bacteria
- Kingdom: Pseudomonadati
- Phylum: Pseudomonadota
- Class: Gammaproteobacteria
- Order: Pasteurellales
- Family: Pasteurellaceae
- Genus: Actinobacillus; Brumpt 1910

Type species
- Actinobacillus lignieresii

Species
- A. anseriformium A. arthritidis A. capsulatus A. delphinicola A. equuli A. hominis A. indolicus A. lignieresii A. minor A. muris A. pleuropneumoniae A. porcinus A. rossii A. scotiae A. seminis A. succinogenes A. suis A. ureae A. vicugnae

= Actinobacillus =

Genus of bacteria

Actinobacillus is a genus of Gram-negative, nonmotile and non-spore-forming, oval to rod-shaped bacteria occurring as parasites or pathogens in mammals, birds, and reptiles. It is a member of the family Pasteurellaceae. The bacteria are facultatively anaerobic or aerobic, capable of fermenting carbohydrates (without production of gas), and of reducing nitrates. The genomic DNA contains between 40 and 47 mol % guanine plus cytosine.

Actinobacillus ureae and Actinobacillus hominis occur in the respiratory tracts of healthy humans and may be involved in the pathogenesis of sinusitis, bronchopneumonia, and meningitis. A. actinomycetemcomitans occurs in the human oral microbiota, and together with anaerobic or capnophilic organisms (HACEK group organisms) may cause endocarditis. Actinobacilli are susceptible to most antibiotics of the beta-lactam family, aminoglycosides, tetracyclines, chloramphenicol, and many other antibacterial chemotherapeutics.

An analysis of A. actinomycetemcomitans indicated it was monophyletic with Haemophilus aphrophilus and H. segnis, and they were proposed to be reclassified as a new genus, Aggregatibacter (from the Latin aggregare, meaning "to come together").
