= Mannheimia =

Scientific classification
- Domain: Bacteria
- Kingdom: Pseudomonadati
- Phylum: Pseudomonadota
- Class: Gammaproteobacteria
- Order: Pasteurellales
- Family: Pasteurellaceae
- Genus: Mannheimia; Angen et al. 1999

Type species
- Mannheimia haemolytica

Species
- M. caviae M. glucosida M. granulomatis M. haemolytica M. ruminalis M. varigena

Genus of bacteria

Mannheimia is a Gram-negative, anaerobic, non-spore-forming and non-motile bacterial genus from the family Pasteurellaceae.
