= Actinobacillus succinogenes =

Scientific classification
- Domain: Bacteria
- Kingdom: Pseudomonadati
- Phylum: Pseudomonadota
- Class: Gammaproteobacteria
- Order: Pasteurellales
- Family: Pasteurellaceae
- Genus: Actinobacillus
- Species: A. succinogenes

Binomial name
- Actinobacillus succinogenes Guettler et al. 1999

Species of bacterium

Actinobacillus succinogenes is a bacterium. It is a succinic acid-producing strain first isolated from the bovine rumen. It is a facultatively anaerobic, pleomorphic, Gram-negative rod. Its type strain is ATCC 55618^{T}.
