= Ceftiofur =

Chemical compound

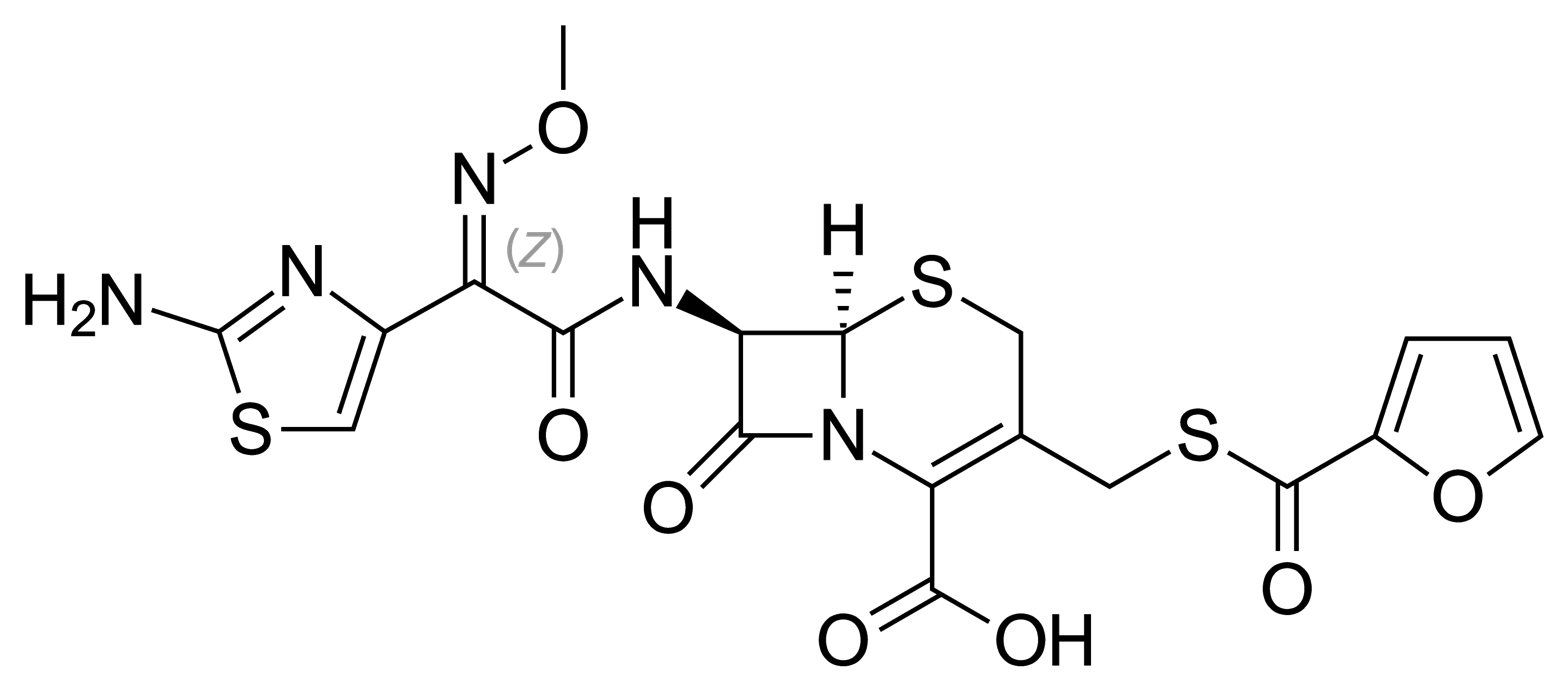

Clinical data
- Trade names: Naxcel
- AHFS/Drugs.com: International Drug Names
- ATCvet code: QJ01DD90 (WHO) QJ01DD99 (WHO), QJ51DD90 (WHO)

Legal status
- Legal status: EU: Rx-only

Identifiers
- IUPAC name: (6R,7R)-7-[ [(2Z)-2-(2-Amino-1,3-thiazol-4-yl)- 2-methoxyiminoacetyl]amino]-3-(furan-2- carbonylsulfanylmethyl)-8-oxo-5-thia-1- azabicyclo[4.2.0]oct-2-ene-2-carboxylic acid
- CAS Number: 80370-57-6
- PubChem CID: 6328657
- ChemSpider: 4886668
- UNII: 83JL932I1C
- KEGG: D07657
- ChEMBL: ChEMBL222913
- CompTox Dashboard (EPA): DTXSID7046702

Chemical and physical data
- Formula: C_{19}H_{17}N_{5}O_{7}S_{3}
- Molar mass: 523.55 g·mol^{−1}
- 3D model (JSmol): Interactive image
- SMILES: O=C2N1/C(=C(\CS[C@@H]1[C@@H]2NC(=O)C(=N\OC)/c3nc(sc3)N)CSC(=O)c4occc4)C(=O)O
- InChI: InChI=1S/C19H17N5O7S3/c1-30-23-11(9-7-34-19(20)21-9)14(25)22-12-15(26)24-13(17(27)28)8(5-32-16(12)24)6-33-18(29)10-3-2-4-31-10/h2-4,7,12,16H,5-6H2,1H3,(H2,20,21)(H,22,25)(H,27,28)/b23-11-/t12-,16-/m1/s1; Key:ZBHXIWJRIFEVQY-IHMPYVIRSA-N

Ceftiofur is an antibiotic of the cephalosporin type (third generation), licensed for use in veterinary medicine. It was first described in 1987. It is marketed by pharmaceutical company Zoetis as Excenel, Naxcel, and Excede and is also the active ingredient in that company's Spectramast LC (lactating cow formulation) and Spectramast DC (dry cow formulation) product.

It is resistant to the antibiotic resistance enzyme beta-lactamase, and has activity against both Gram-positive and Gram-negative bacteria. Escherichia coli strains resistant to ceftiofur have been reported.

The metabolite desfuroylceftiofur also has antibiotic activity. The two compounds are measured together to measure for antibiotic activity in milk (alongside other antibiotics).
