= Arachnia (bacterium) =

Scientific classification
- Domain: Bacteria
- Kingdom: Bacillati
- Phylum: Actinomycetota
- Class: Actinomycetes
- Order: Propionibacteriales
- Family: Propionibacteriaceae
- Genus: Arachnia; Pine and Georg 1969

Type species
- Arachnia propionica (Buchanan and Pine 1962) Pine and Georg 1969

Species
- A. propionica; A. rubra

Synonyms
- Pseudopropionibacterium Scholz and Kilian 2016

Genus of bacteria

Arachnia is a bacterial genus from the family Propionibacteriaceae.

== Phylogeny ==
The currently accepted taxonomy is based on the List of Prokaryotic names with Standing in Nomenclature (LPSN) and National Center for Biotechnology Information (NCBI).

16S rRNA based LTP_10_2024

- - - Tessaracoccus
      - T. antarcticus Li et al. 2016
      - - - T. rhinocerotis Li et al. 2016
          - T. terricola Chaudhary and Kim 2018
        - - - T. flavus Kumari et al. 2016
            - - T. lubricantis Kämpfer et al. 2009
              - - T. aquimaris Tak et al. 2018
                - T. oleiagri Cai et al. 2011
          - - - T. defluvii Srinivasan et al. 2017
              - T. palaemonis Kim et al. 2022
            - - T. flavescens Lee and Lee 2008
              - - T. bendigoensis Maszenan et al. 1999
                - T. coleopterorum Hyun et al. 2021
  - - Brooklawnia cerclae Rainey et al. 2006
    - - - Arachnia rubra (Saito et al. 2018) Tindall 2019
        - - Tessaracoccus caeni Wang et al. 2023
          - - Tessaracoccus arenae Thongphrom et al. 2017
            - Tessaracoccus lapidicaptus Puente-Sánchez et al. 2014
      - - - - Propionimicrobium
            - Vaginimicrobium
          - Propionibacterium
        - - - Cutibacterium granulosum
            - Acidipropionibacterium
          - - - Cutibacterium equinum
              - - Arachnia propionica (Buchanan & Pine 1962) Pine & Georg 1969
                - Cutibacterium avidum
            - Cutibacterium

120 marker proteins based GTDB 10-RS226

- Arachnia
  - - - Tessaracoccus antarcticus
      - Tessaracoccus rhinocerotis
    - - A. rubra
      - - Tessaracoccus massiliensis Seck et al. 2025
        - A. propionica
  - - - Tessaracoccus oleiagri
      - "Tessaracoccus timonensis" Fall et al. 2019
    - - - Tessaracoccus lapidicaptus
        - - Tessaracoccus flavus
          - Tessaracoccus lubricantis
      - - Tessaracoccus defluvii
        - - - Tessaracoccus lacteus Tan et al. 2025
            - Tessaracoccus palaemonis
          - - Tessaracoccus flavescens
            - - Tessaracoccus aquimaris
              - - Tessaracoccus bendigoensis
                - Tessaracoccus coleopterorum

Species incertae sedis:

- "Pseudopropionibacterium massiliense" Belkacemi et al. 2019
- "Tessaracoccus nasisuum" Schlattmann et al. 2018
- "Tessaracoccus profundi" Finster et al. 2009

== See also ==
- List of bacterial orders
- List of bacteria genera
