= Oral microbiology =

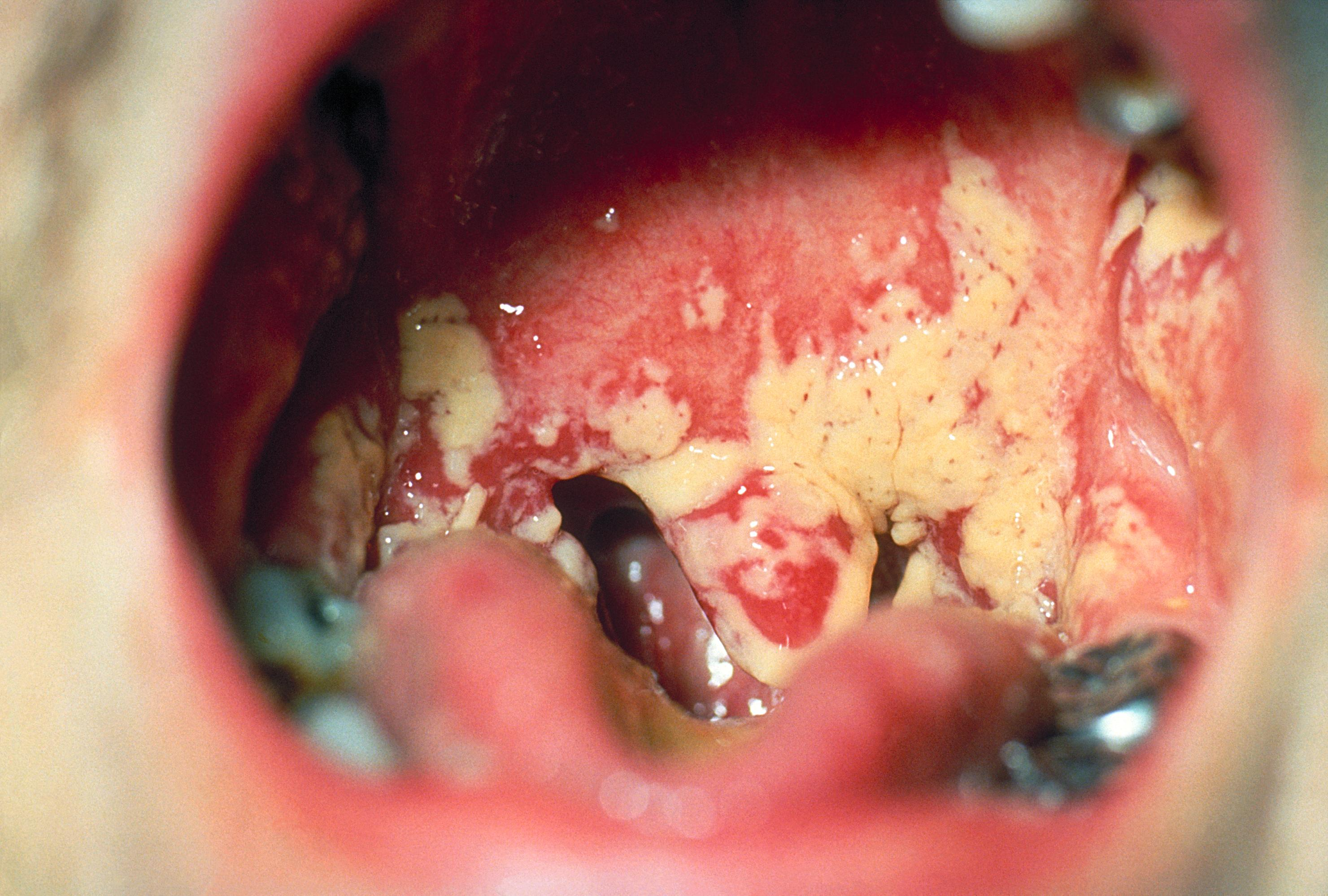
Thrush, a common condition caused by overgrowth of the fungus Candida albicans. Cases are characterized by growth of matted, yellow-white patches of fungus in the mouth.

Oral microbiology is the study of the microorganisms (microbiotas) of the oral cavity and their interactions between oral microorganisms or with the host. The environment present in the human mouth is suited to the growth of characteristic microorganisms found there. It provides a source of water and nutrients, as well as a moderate temperature. Resident microbes of the mouth adhere to the teeth and gums to resist mechanical flushing from the mouth to stomach where acid-sensitive microbes are destroyed by hydrochloric acid. Recent approaches in the microbiome studies suggest that different niches in the oral cavity such as tooth surfaces, tongue dorsal, gingival crevices, buccal mucosa and saliva provide different conditions (different pH, oxygen levels, nutrient availability) and microenvironments that favour different types of microorganisms.

Anaerobic bacteria in the oral cavity include: Actinomyces, Arachnia (Propionibacterium propionicus), Bacteroides, Bifidobacterium, Eubacterium, Fusobacterium, Lactobacillus, Leptotrichia, Peptococcus, Peptostreptococcus, Propionibacterium, Selenomonas, Treponema, and Veillonella. The most commonly found protists are Entamoeba gingivalis and Trichomonas tenax. Genera of fungi that are frequently found in the mouth include Candida, Cladosporium, Aspergillus, Fusarium, Glomus, Alternaria, Penicillium, and Cryptococcus, among others. Many of these microorganisms are now classified within the broader of oral microbiome, where their roles in health and disease are being re‑evaluated using techniques such as deep sequencing. In some individuals, overrepresentation or underrepresentation of certain species in these microbial groups has been associated with changes in oral microbiome (known as dysbiosis) that are more consistent with disease-related phenotypes. Recent studies also suggest that many microorganisms are specialised to particular niches, such as subgingival crevice or dorsum of the tongue, and are not evenly distributed throughout the oral cavity. Bacteria accumulate on both the hard and soft oral tissues in biofilms. Bacterial adhesion is particularly important for oral bacteria.

Oral bacteria have evolved mechanisms to sense their environment and evade or modify the host. Bacteria occupy the ecological niche provided by both the tooth surface and mucosal epithelium. Factors of note that have been found to affect the microbial colonization of the oral cavity include the pH, oxygen concentration and its availability at specific oral surfaces, mechanical forces acting upon oral surfaces, salivary and fluid flow through the oral cavity, and age. It has been observed that the oral microbiota differs between men and women in conditions of oral health, but especially during periodontitis. However, a highly efficient innate host defense system constantly monitors the bacterial colonization and prevents bacterial invasion of local tissues. A dynamic equilibrium exists between dental plaque bacteria and the innate host defense system. Oral microorganisms play a role in the two major dental diseases: dental caries and periodontal disease. The concept of the oral microbiota suggests that oral health or disease results from the collective activities and interaction of these microorganisms, not from individual microorganisms acting alone.

== Oral microflora ==
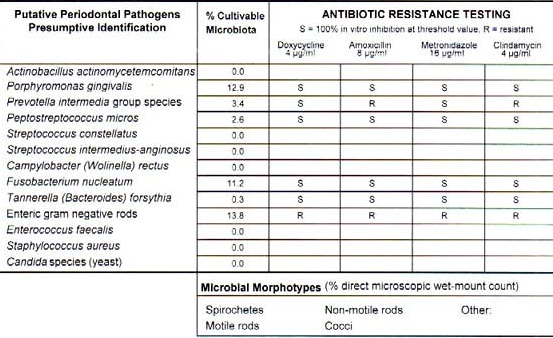
Oral Microbiology Lab Analysis Report.

The oral microbiome, complex and diverse microbial community including (bacteria, viruses, fungi, archaea and protozoa) mainly comprising bacteria which have developed resistance to the human immune system, has been known to impact the host for its own benefit, as seen with dental cavities. The environment present in the human mouth allows the growth of characteristic microorganisms found there. It provides a source of water and nutrients, as well as a moderate temperature. Resident microbes of the mouth adhere to the teeth and gums to resist mechanical flushing from the mouth to stomach where acid-sensitive microbes are destroyed by hydrochloric acid.

Anaerobic bacteria in the oral cavity include: Actinomyces, Arachnia, Bacteroides, Bifidobacterium, Eubacterium, Fusobacterium, Lactobacillus, Leptotrichia, Peptococcus, Peptostreptococcus, Propionibacterium, Selenomonas, Treponema, and Veillonella. In addition, there are also a number of fungi found in the oral cavity, including: Candida, Cladosporium, Aspergillus, Fusarium, Glomus, Alternaria, Penicillium, and Cryptococcus. The oral cavity of a new-born baby does not contain bacteria but rapidly becomes colonized with bacteria such as Streptococcus salivarius. With the appearance of the teeth during the first year colonization by Streptococcus mutans and Streptococcus sanguinis occurs as these organisms colonise the dental surface and gingiva. Other strains of streptococci adhere strongly to the gums and cheeks but not to the teeth. The gingival crevice area (supporting structures of the teeth) provides a habitat for a variety of anaerobic species. Bacteroides and spirochetes colonize the mouth around puberty.

== Ecological sites for oral microbiota ==
As a diverse environment, a variety of organisms can inhabit unique ecological niches present in the oral cavity including the teeth, gingiva, tongue, cheeks, and palates. These different sites support distinct but interconnected communities of microorganisms, implying that their composition is shaped by local conditions and other factors such as diet, age and immune system status.

=== Dental plaque ===
The dental plaque is made up of the microbial community that is adhered to the tooth surface; this plaque is also recognized as a biofilm. While it is said that this plaque is adhered to the tooth surface, the microbial community of the plaque is not directly in contact with the enamel of the tooth. Instead, bacteria with the ability to form attachments to the acquired pellicle, which contains certain salivary proteins, on the surface of the teeth, begin the establishment of the biofilm. Upon dental plaque maturation, in which the microbial community grows and diversifies, the plaque is covered in an interbacterial matrix. The plaque microbiome is highly correlated to oral microbiome dysbiosis, with changes and alteration in its composition and are associated with dental caries and periodontal diseases.

=== Dental calculus ===
The calculus of the oral cavity is the result of mineralization of and around dead microorganisms; this calculus can then be colonized by living bacteria. Dental calculus can be present on supragingival and subgingival surfaces.

=== Oral mucosa ===
The mucosa of the oral cavity provides a unique ecological site for microbiota to inhabit. Unlike the teeth, the mucosa of the oral cavity is frequently shedding and thus its microbial inhabitants are both kept at lower relative abundance than those of the teeth but also must be able to overcome the obstacle of the shedding epithelia.

==== Tongue ====
Unlike other mucosal surfaces of the oral cavity, the nature of the top surface of the tongue, due in part to the presence of numerous papillae, provides a unique ecological niche for its microbial inhabits. One important characteristic of this habitat is that the spaces between the papillae tend to not receive much, if any, oxygenated saliva, which creates an environment suitable for microaerophilic and obligate anaerobic microbiota. The tongue microbiome is considered as a key component of the oral microbiome, with implications for malodorous mouth, dysbiotic community shifts and modulation of host-immunity responses.

== Acquisition of oral microbiota ==
Acquisition of the oral microbiota heavily depends on the route of delivery as an infant – vaginal versus caesarian; upon comparing infants three months after birth, infants born vaginally were reported to have higher oral taxonomic diversity than their cesarean-born counterparts. Further acquisition is determined by diet, developmental accomplishments, general lifestyle habits, hygiene, and the use of antibiotics. Breastfed infants are noted to have higher oral lactobacilli colonization than their formula-fed counterparts. Diversity of the oral microbiome is also shown to flourish upon the eruption of primary teeth and later adult teeth, as new ecological niches are introduced to the oral cavity.

== Factors of microbial colonization ==
Saliva plays a considerable role in influencing the oral microbiome. More than 800 species of bacteria colonize oral mucus, 1,300 species are found in the gingival crevice, and nearly 1,000 species comprise dental plaque. The mouth is a rich environment for hundreds of species of bacteria since saliva is mostly water and plenty of nutrients pass through the mouth each day. When kissing, it takes only 10 seconds for no less than 80 million bacteria to be exchanged by the passing of saliva. However, the effect is transitory, as each individual quickly returns to their own equilibrium.

Due to progress in molecular biology techniques, scientific understanding of oral ecology is improving. Oral ecology is being more comprehensively mapped, including the tongue, the teeth, the gums, salivary glands, etc. which are home to these communities of different microorganisms.

The host's immune system controls the bacterial colonization of the mouth and prevents local infection of tissues. A dynamic equilibrium exists notably between the bacteria of dental plaque and the host's immune system, enabling the plaque to stay behind in the mouth when other biofilms are washed away.

In equilibrium, the bacterial biofilm produced by the fermentation of sugar in the mouth is quickly swept away by the saliva, except for dental plaque. In cases of imbalance in the equilibrium, oral microorganisms grow out of control and cause oral diseases such as tooth decay and periodontal disease. Several studies have also linked poor oral hygiene to infection by pathogenic bacteria.

== Role in health ==
The oral microbiota is largely related to systemic health, and disturbances in the oral microbiota can lead to diseases in both the oral cavity and the rest of the body. There are many factors that influence the diversity of the oral microbiota, such as age, diet, hygiene practices, and genetics.

Oral microorganisms play a significant role in the two major dental diseases, dental caries and periodontal disease. There are many factors of oral health which need to be preserved in order to prevent pathogenesis of the oral microbiota or diseases of the mouth. Dental plaque is the material that adheres to the teeth and consists of bacterial cells (mainly S. mutans and S. sanguis), salivary polymers and bacterial extracellular products. Plaque is a biofilm on the surfaces of the teeth. This accumulation of microorganisms subject the teeth and gingival tissues to high concentrations of bacterial metabolites which results in dental disease. If not taken care of, via brushing or flossing, the plaque can turn into tartar (its hardened form) and lead to gingivitis or periodontal disease. In the case of dental cavities, proteins involved in colonization of teeth by Streptococcus mutans can produce antibodies that inhibit the cariogenic process which can be used to create vaccines.

Bacteria species typically associated with the oral microbiota have been found to be present in women with bacterial vaginosis. Genera of fungi that are frequently found in the mouth include Candida, Cladosporium, Aspergillus, Fusarium, Glomus, Alternaria, Penicillium, and Cryptococcus, among others.

Additionally, research has correlated poor oral health and the resulting ability of the oral microbiota to invade the body to affect cardiac health as well as cognitive function. High levels of circulating antibodies to oral pathogens Campylobacter rectus, Veillonella parvula and Prevotella melaninogenica are associated with hypertension in humans.

=== Importance of dental hygiene ===
One of the most important factors in promoting optimal oral microbiota health is the use of good oral hygiene practices. To prevent any possible complication from an altered oral microbiota, it is important to brush and floss every day, schedule regular cleanings, eat a healthy diet, and replace toothbrushes frequently. Dental plaque is associated with two extremely common oral diseases, dental caries and periodontal disease. Consistent toothbrushing and flossing is essential for disrupting harmful plaque formation. Research has shown that flossing is associated with a decrease in the bacteria Streptococcus mutans which has been shown to be involved in cavity formation. Insufficient brushing and flossing can lead to gum and tooth disease, and eventually tooth loss.

In addition, poor dental hygiene has been linked to conditions such as osteoporosis, diabetes and cardiovascular diseases.

== Issues and areas of research ==
The oral environment (temperature, humidity, pH, nutrients, etc.) impacts the selection of adapted (and sometimes pathogenic) populations of microorganisms. For a young person or an adult in good health and with a healthy diet, the microbes living in the mouth adhere to mucus, teeth and gums to resist removal by saliva. Eventually, they are mostly washed away and destroyed during their trip through the stomach. Salivary flow and oral conditions vary person-to-person, and also relative to the time of day and whether or not an individual sleeps with their mouth open. From youth to old age, the entire mouth interacts with and affects the oral microbiome. Via the larynx, numerous bacteria can travel through the respiratory tract to the lungs. There, mucus is charged with their removal. Pathogenic oral microflora have been linked to the production of factors which favor autoimmune diseases such as psoriasis and arthritis, as well as cancers of the colon, lungs and breasts.

== Intercellular communication ==
Most of the bacterial species found in the mouth belong to microbial communities, called biofilms, a feature of which is inter-bacterial communication. Cell–cell contact is mediated by specific protein adhesins and often, as in the case of inter-species aggregation, by complementary polysaccharide receptors. Another method of communication involves cell–cell signalling molecules, which are of two classes: those used for intra-species and those used for inter-species signalling. An example of intra-species communication is quorum sensing. Oral bacteria have been shown to produce small peptides, such as competence stimulating peptides, which can help promote single-species biofilm formation. A common form of inter-species signalling is mediated by 4, 5-dihydroxy-2, 3-pentanedione (DPD), also known as autoinducer-2 (Al-2).

== Evolution ==
The evolution of the human oral microbiome can be traced through time via the sequencing of dental calculus (essentially fossilized dental plaque).

As mentioned in prior sections, the human oral microbiome has important implications for the health and wellness of human beings overall, and is often the only surviving health record for ancient populations.

The oral microbiome has evolved over time alongside humans, in response to changes in diet, lifestyle, environment, and even the advent of cooking. There have also been similarities in oral microbiota across hominins, as well as other primate species. While a core microbiome consisting of specific bacteria exists across most individuals, significant variation can arise depending on an individual’s unique environment, lifestyle, physiology, and heritage.

Considering that oral bacteria are transferred vertically from primary caregivers in early childhood, and horizontally between family members later in life, archaeological dental calculus is a unique way to trace population structure, movement, and admixture between ancient cultures, as well as the spread of disease.

=== Pre-Mesolithic ===
==== Relationship to primates ====
Ancient humans are thought to have maintained a much different oral microbiome landscape than non-human primates, despite having a shared environment. Existing data has found that chimpanzees maintain higher levels of Bacteroidetes and Fusobacteria, while humans have greater proportions of Firmicutes and Proteobacteria. Human oral microbiota have also been found to be less diverse when compared with other primates.

==== Relationship to hominins ====
Of the hominins (Homo erectus, Neanderthals, Denisovans) Neanderthal oral microbiomes have been studied in the greatest detail. A cluster of oral microbiota has been found to be shared across Spanish Neanderthals, foraging humans from ~3000 years ago, and a single wild-caught chimpanzee. Similarities have also been found between a meat-eating Neanderthal in Belgium, and hunter humans in Europe and Africa. Ozga et al. (2019) found that Neanderthals and humans share similar oral microbiota, and are more alike to each other than to chimpanzees. Weyrich (2021) finds that these observations suggest humans shared an oral microbiota with Neanderthals until at least 3000 years ago. While it is possible that humans and Neanderthals shared oral microbiota from the moment of separation (~700,000 years ago) until their extinction, Weyrich finds that an equally likely hypothesis is that convergent evolution accounted for similar oral microbiotas across Neanderthals and humans for that period.

=== Major shifts through archaeological periods ===
The human oral microbiome has been a subject of increasing scientific scrutiny, especially in understanding its evolutionary journey. The oral microbiome has undergone significant shifts in composition, particularly during key historical periods like the Neolithic and the Industrial Revolution.

==== The Neolithic revolution: a turning point ====
The Neolithic period began around 10,000 years ago and marked a significant turning point in human history. This era saw the shift from a hunter-gatherer lifestyle to agriculture and farming. One of the most significant changes during this period was the adoption of carbohydrate-rich diets, particularly the consumption of domesticated cereals like wheat and barley. This shift had a profound impact on the oral microbiome. The increase in fermentable carbohydrates led to a surge in dental caries, a common oral health issue. Additionally, the Neolithic period also witnessed a reduction in microbial diversity in the oral environment.

==== The Medieval period: a period of stability ====
Transitioning from the Neolithic to the Medieval period, which began around 400 years ago, there was little change in the composition of the oral microbiota. This period of stability suggests that despite advancements in agriculture and societal structures, the oral microbiome remained relatively constant. This period did not bring about significant shifts in oral microbial communities, indicating a sort of equilibrium had been reached.

==== The Industrial Revolution: a modern dilemma ====
The Industrial Revolution, starting around 1850, brought about another significant shift in human lifestyle and, consequently, the oral microbiome. The widespread availability of industrially processed flour and sugar led to a predominance of cariogenic bacteria in the oral environment. This shift has persisted to the present day, making the modern oral microbiome less diverse than ever before, rendering it less resilient to perturbations in the form of dietary imbalances or invasion by pathogenic bacterial species.

==== Implications for modern health ====
The shifts in the oral microbiome through time have significant implications for modern health. The current lack of diversity in the oral microbiome makes it more susceptible to imbalances and pathogenic invasions. This, in turn, can lead to a range of oral and systemic health issues, from dental caries to cardiovascular disease. Dental caries affects between 60 and 90% of children and adults in industrialized countries, and has a more severe effect on less industrialized countries with less capable healthcare systems. An understanding of the oral microbiome, via an examination of the evolution of the oral microbiome, can help science understand past errors and help inform the best path forward in sustainable healthcare interventions that work proactively with the body's natural systems, rather than fighting them with intermittent reactive interventions.

Systemic effects of human oral microbiome.

== See also ==
- Biofilms
- Dental plaque
- Environmental microbiology
- Human microbiota
- Human Microbiome Project
- Microbiology
- Theodor Rosebury
- List of bacterial vaginosis microbiota
