= PJI =

PJI may refer to:

== Medicine ==
- Prosthetic joint infection

== Organizations ==
- Pacific Justice Institute (PJI)
- Pilot John International (PJi)
