= Acidipropionibacterium timonense =

Scientific classification
- Domain: Bacteria
- Kingdom: Bacillati
- Phylum: Actinomycetota
- Class: Actinomycetes
- Order: Propionibacteriales
- Family: Propionibacteriaceae
- Genus: Acidipropionibacterium
- Species: A. timonense

Binomial name
- Acidipropionibacterium timonense Togo et al. 2019

Genus of bacteria

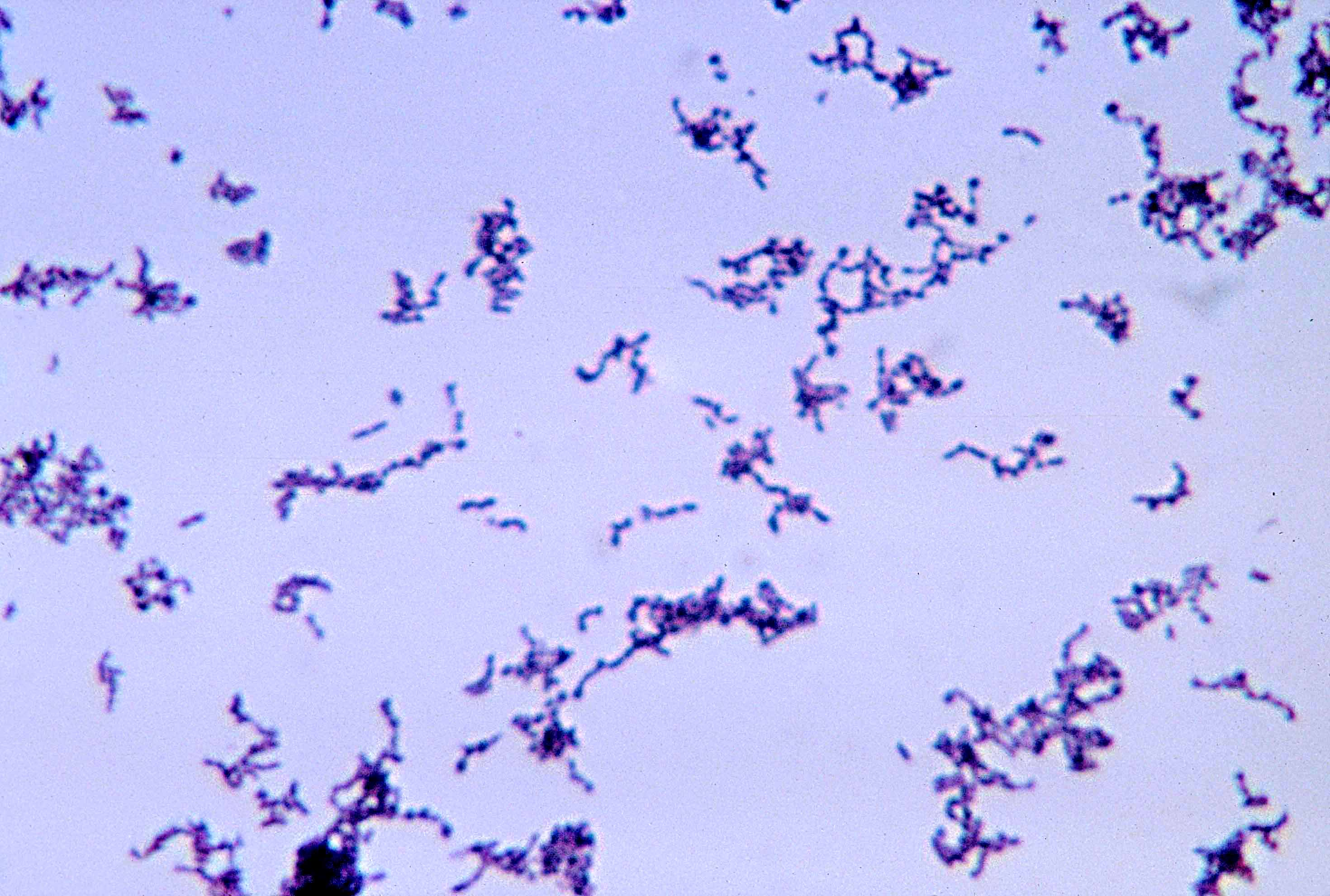
Cutibacterium acnes, a close relative of A. timonense

Acidipropionibacterium timonense (A. timonense) is a bacterium from the genus of Acidipropionibacterium.

== Discovery ==
A. timonense was discovered in 2019 during a macrobiotic study of the breast milk of 4 unrelated healthy mothers in Mali. Alongside A. timonense, Lactimicrobium massiliense, Anaerolactibacter massiliensis, and Galactobacillus timonensis were also discovered. These four species were first isolated in breast milk, making them the first species since Streptococcus lactarius to be discovered by this method. The name timonense was to signify the French quarter of La Timone located in Marseille, the location in which the species was first isolated and discovered. A. timonense's taxonomic status is not currently recognized by the International Code of Nomenclature of Prokaryotes.

== Taxonomy and Evolution ==
For phylogenetic analysis, 16S ribosomal RNA PCR was used to identity and classify A. timonense. Genetic classification of 16S RNA found that L. massiliense, A. massiliensis, and G. timonensis were closely related, while A. timonense was more closely related to Cutibacterium acnes, Cutibacterium avidum, and Cutibacterium granulosum. A. timonense is also related to the propionibacterium genus, and is part of the larger propionibacteriaceae family. A phylogenetic tree comparing A. timonense to genetically similar species is shown below:

- - Propionibacterium
  - - C. granulosum
    - - A. timonense
      - - Acidipropionibacterium

== Description and Cell Biology ==
A. timonense is a gram-positive, non-endospore forming, non-motile, and faculative anaerobic bacterium. The bacteria is 0.8 μm in width and 1.2 μm long with a coccobacilli (short rod) shape. The cell wall is primarily made up of 15-carbon fatty acid chains. A. timonense has been observed to grow between 28°C and 45°C, with optimal growth occurring at 37°C. A. timonense's pH range is between 6.5 and 8.0, with optimum growth at 7.5. Colonies of A. timonense are circular, cream-colored, and non-haemolytic. Metabolically, A. timonense is capable of hydrolysing aesculin and gelatine, and ferments cellobiose, maltose, glucose, glycerol, sucrose, and trehalose, along with most other sugars. A. timonense is unable to produce urease and, thus, cannot reduce nitrates. Additionally, it cannot ferment arabinose, rhamnose, sorbitol and xylose.
