= Arachnia =

Arachnia may refer to:

- Arachnia, a 2003 USA horror film
- Arachnia (bacterium), a genus of bacteria in the family Propionibacteriaceae
- Arachnia, a genus of butterflies in the family Nymphalidae, synonym of Araschnia
