= Propionibacterium acnes type zappae =

Propionibacterium zappae

Scientific classification
- Domain: Bacteria
- Phylum: Actinomycetota
- Class: Actinomycetia
- Order: Actinomycetales
- Family: Propionibacteriaceae
- Genus: Propionibacterium
- Species: P. acnes
- Subspecies: P. a. zappae

Bacterium found on grapevines

Propionibacterium acnes type zappae is a gram-positive, anaerobic, and endophytic bacterium species of Propionibacterium. In 2014, it was found in an interkingdom bacterial transfer with grapevines (Vitis vinifera), which is unexpected because P. acne is found on human skin. P. acnes zappae emerged about 7,000 years ago, roughly when the grapevine was domesticated. The bacterium colonizes the bark tissue and the pith of the grapevine. P. zappae has endophytic characteristics which suggests that the bacterium has adapted to its new grapevine host as well as formed an endocellular symbiosis with the plant.

P. acnes type zappae was named after the Italian term "zappa" 'hoe' and as a tribute to the musician Frank Zappa who wrote about "sand-blasted zits". The unconventional behavior of this bacteria and its unique habitat caused scientists to think of Zappa and name the bacteria after him.
