= Propioniciclava tarda =

Scientific classification
- Domain: Bacteria
- Kingdom: Bacillati
- Phylum: Actinomycetota
- Class: Actinomycetia
- Order: Propionibacteriales
- Family: Propionibacteriaceae
- Genus: Propioniciclava
- Species: P. tarda

Binomial name
- Propioniciclava tarda Sugawara et al. 2011

Type strain
- DSM 22130; JCM 15804; WR061

Species of bacterium

Propioniciclava tarda is a Gram-positive, non-spore-forming, facultatively anaerobic and non-motile bacterium from the genus Propioniciclava which has been isolated from rice-straw in Hokkaido, Japan.
