= Luteococcus peritonei =

Scientific classification
- Domain: Bacteria
- Kingdom: Bacillati
- Phylum: Actinomycetota
- Class: Actinomycetia
- Order: Propionibacteriales
- Family: Propionibacteriaceae
- Genus: Luteococcus
- Species: L. peritonei

Binomial name
- Luteococcus peritonei Collins et al. 2000

Type strain
- 5-3790; ATCC BAA-60; CCM 7172; CCUG 38120; CIP 106441; DSM 15826; JCM 11685; Skovde 17 216

Species of bacterium

Luteococcus peritonei is a Gram-positive bacterium from the genus Luteococcus which has been isolated from a human peritoneum.
