= Propionicimonas paludicola =

Scientific classification
- Domain: Bacteria
- Kingdom: Bacillati
- Phylum: Actinomycetota
- Class: Actinomycetia
- Order: Propionibacteriales
- Family: Propionibacteriaceae
- Genus: Propionicimonas
- Species: P. paludicola

Binomial name
- Propionicimonas paludicola Akasaka et al. 2003

Type strain
- CCUG 53880; DSM 15597; JCM 11933; Wd

Species of bacterium

Propionicimonas paludicola is a Gram-positive, non-spore-forming, pleomorphic and non-motile bacterium from the genus Propionicimonas which has been isolated from plant residue from rice field soil in Japan.
