= Mariniluteicoccus endophyticus =

Scientific classification
- Domain: Bacteria
- Kingdom: Bacillati
- Phylum: Actinomycetota
- Class: Actinomycetia
- Order: Propionibacteriales
- Family: Propionibacteriaceae
- Genus: Mariniluteicoccus
- Species: M. endophyticus

Binomial name
- Mariniluteicoccus endophyticus Liu et al. 2016

Type strain
- DSM 28728; JCM 30097; KCTC 29482; YIM 2617; YIM 2617-2

Species of bacterium

Mariniluteicoccus endophyticus is a Gram-positive, aerobic and non-motil bacterium from the genus Mariniluteicoccus which has been isolated from the root of the plant Ocimum basilicum from Shilin County, China.
