= Luteococcus sediminum =

Scientific classification
- Domain: Bacteria
- Kingdom: Bacillati
- Phylum: Actinomycetota
- Class: Actinomycetia
- Order: Propionibacteriales
- Family: Propionibacteriaceae
- Genus: Luteococcus
- Species: L. sediminum

Binomial name
- Luteococcus sediminum Fan et al. 2014

Type strain
- DSM 27277; JCM 19259; XH208

Species of bacterium

Luteococcus sediminum is a Gram-positive and strictly aerobic bacterium from the genus Luteococcus which has been isolated from deep subseafloor sediments from the South Pacific Gyre in the Pacific Ocean.
