= Acidipropionibacterium olivae =

Scientific classification
- Domain: Bacteria
- Kingdom: Bacillati
- Phylum: Actinomycetota
- Class: Actinomycetia
- Order: Propionibacteriales
- Family: Propionibacteriaceae
- Genus: Acidipropionibacterium
- Species: A. olivae

Binomial name
- Acidipropionibacterium olivae (Lucena-Padrós et al. 2014) Scholz and Kilian 2016

Type strain
- IGBL1

Synonyms
- Propionibacterium olivae Lucena-Padrós et al. 2014

Genus of bacteria

Acidipropionibacterium olivae is a Gram-positive bacterium from the genus of Acidipropionibacterium which has been isolated from Spanish-style green olives from Sevilla in Spain.
