= Raineyella antarctica =

Scientific classification
- Domain: Bacteria
- Kingdom: Bacillati
- Phylum: Actinomycetota
- Class: Actinomycetia
- Order: Propionibacteriales
- Family: Propionibacteriaceae
- Genus: Raineyella
- Species: R. antarctica

Binomial name
- Raineyella antarctica Pikuta et al. 2016

Type strain
- ATCC TSD-18; DSM 100494; JCM 30886; 10J; LZ-22

Species of bacterium

Raineyella antarctica is a Gram-positive, psychrotolerant and motile bacterium from the genus Raineyella which has been isolated from the moss Leptobryum from the shore of Lake Zub in Antarctica.
