= Microlunatus antarcticus =

Scientific classification
- Domain: Bacteria
- Kingdom: Bacillati
- Phylum: Actinomycetota
- Class: Actinomycetia
- Order: Propionibacteriales
- Family: Propionibacteriaceae
- Genus: Microlunatus
- Species: M. antarcticus

Binomial name
- Microlunatus antarcticus (Schumann et al. 1997) Nouioui et al. 2018

Type strain
- AA-1042; DSM 11053

Synonyms
- Friedmanniella antarctica Schumann et al. 1997

Species of bacterium

Microlunatus antarcticus is an LL-diaminopimelic acid-containing actinomycete. It is gram-positive, aerobic and slowly growing.
