= Microlunatus lucidus =

Scientific classification
- Domain: Bacteria
- Kingdom: Bacillati
- Phylum: Actinomycetota
- Class: Actinomycetia
- Order: Propionibacteriales
- Family: Propionibacteriaceae
- Genus: Microlunatus
- Species: M. lucidus

Binomial name
- Microlunatus lucidus (Iwai et al. 2010) Nouioui et al. 2018

Type strain
- FA2^{T} DSM 21742^{T} NBRC 104964^{T}

Synonyms
- Friedmanniella lucida Iwai et al. 2010

Species of bacterium

Microlunatus lucidus is a Gram-positive, non-motile, aerobic actinomycete.
