= Microlunatus phosphovorus =

Scientific classification
- Domain: Bacteria
- Kingdom: Bacillati
- Phylum: Actinomycetota
- Class: Actinomycetia
- Order: Propionibacteriales
- Family: Propionibacteriaceae
- Genus: Microlunatus
- Species: M. phosphovorus

Binomial name
- Microlunatus phosphovorus Nakamura et al. 1995

Type strain
- ATCC 700054; CIP 104466; DSM 10555; HAMBI 2303; JCM 9379; NBRC 101784; NM-1; VKM Ac-1990

Species of bacterium

Microlunatus phosphovorus is the type species of the bacterial genus Microlunatus. It is Gram-positive and is notable for being a polyphosphate-accumulating bacterium. It is coccus-shaped, aerobic, chemoorganotrophic.
