= Mariniluteicoccus flavus =

Scientific classification
- Domain: Bacteria
- Kingdom: Bacillati
- Phylum: Actinomycetota
- Class: Actinomycetia
- Order: Propionibacteriales
- Family: Propionibacteriaceae
- Genus: Mariniluteicoccus
- Species: M. flavus

Binomial name
- Mariniluteicoccus flavus Zhang et al. 2014

Type strain
- CCTCC AB 2012055; DSM 25892; YIM M13146

Species of bacterium

Mariniluteicoccus flavus is a Gram-positive, aerobic and non-motile bacterium from the genus Mariniluteicoccus which has been isolated from deep-sea sediment from the South China Sea near China.
