= Prosthetic joint infection =

Infection of an artificial joint

- Other names: artificial joint infection, Infected joint prosthesis, joint replacement infection
- Specialty: Infectious disease, microbiology, orthopaedics, rheumatology
- Symptoms: joint pain, joint swelling, erythema, sinus tract formation, prosthetic loosening, warmth of the joint, fever
- Complications: Joint replacement failure
- Duration: May be acute, subacute or chronic, duration varies from days (acute infection) to many months (chronic infection)
- Causes: microorganisms (usually bacteria, but also fungi) causing infection of a prosthetic joint
- Risk factors: smoking, diabetes, immunosuppression, obesity, chronic liver or kidney disease
- Diagnostic method: Based on culture of microorganism from the affected joint, or other indirect methods such as inflammatory cells detected in joint aspirate
- Differential diagnosis: Aseptic joint loosening, crystal arthropathy, rheumatoid arthritis
- Prevention: Antibiotic prophylaxis prior to joint replacement surgery
- Treatment: Systemic and local antibiotics, joint replacement revision, debridement
- Medication: Antibiotics
- Frequency: Approximately 2% of hip and knee replacements

Prosthetic joint infection (PJI), also known as peri-prosthetic joint infection, is an acute, sub-acute or chronic infection of a prosthetic joint. It may occur in the period after the joint replacement or many years later. It usually presents as joint pain, erythema (redness of the joint or adjacent area), joint swelling and sometimes formation of a sinus tract ( a tract connecting the joint space to the outer environment). PJI is estimated to occur in approximately 2% of hip and knee replacements, and up to 4% of revision hip or knee replacements. Other estimates indicate that 1.4-2.5% of all joint replacements worldwide are complicated by PJIs. The incidence is expected to rise significantly in the future as hip replacements and knee replacements become more common. It is usually caused by aerobic gram positive bacteria, such as Staph epidermidis or Staphylococcus aureus but enterococcus species, gram negative organisms and Cutibacterium are also known causes with fungal infections being a rare culprit. The definitive diagnosis is isolation of the causative organism from the synovial fluid (joint fluid), but signs of inflammation in the joint fluid and imaging may also aid in the diagnosis. The treatment is a combination of systemic antibiotics, debridement of infectious and necrotic tissue and local antibiotics applied to the joint space. The bacteria that usually cause prosthetic joint infections commonly form a biofilm, or a thick slime that is adherent to the artificial joint surface, thus making treatment challenging.

== Signs and symptoms ==
The most common symptom of periprosthetic joint infections is joint pain. Other local symptoms are also present, including erythema (redness of the joint), joint swelling, warmth of the joint, and loosening of the prosthetic joint. A sinus tract, or a tract connecting the joint space to the external environment, is more common in chronic PJI, and is definitively diagnostic of PJI. Fever may be present in PJI, but is uncommon.

== Cause ==
Prosthetic joint infections can occur any time after a joint replacement. Early infections (occurring within 4 weeks of a joint replacement) are usually due to Staph aureus, streptococci or enterococci. Whereas late infections (occurring 3 months or later after the joint replacement) are usually due to coagulase negative staphylococcus or cutibacterium. The highest risk of PJI is in the immediate post-operative period, when direct inoculation of bacteria into the joint space may occur during surgery. The risk of PJI is highest in this early period; within 2 years of the joint replacement. Hematogenous spread, or infection of a prosthetic joint via direct seeding from a bloodstream infection, may occur at any time after a joint replacement, with the risk being as high as 34% in staph aureus bacteremia. An additional possible cause of PJI is from direct spread to the joint from a nearby skin or soft tissue infection, a bone infection (osteomyelitis), or from more distal spread to the joint from a respiratory tract infection, gastroenteritis, or urinary tract infection. Dental procedures may cause a transient bacteremia which can lead to inoculation of the artificial joint and PJI, with strep viridans being the most common causative organism.

The most common causes of PJIs are aerobic, gram positive bacteria, including staph aureus and coagulase negative staphylococcus (such as staph epidermidis), which make up greater than 50% of all causes of hip and knee PJIs. With regards to acute PJIs, the most common causative organism is staph aureus (comprising 38% of acute infections) followed by aerobic gram negative bacilli (making up 24% of acute infections). 70% of PJIs are monomicrobial (with a single causative organism identified), whereas 25% of cases are polymicrobial (with multiple causative organisms identified). 3% of PJIs are due to fungal organisms. Propionibacterium acnes is the most common cause of shoulder PJIs.

Risk factors for PJI include diabetes, immunosuppression, smoking, obesity, chronic kidney disease, the presence of a soft tissue infection, or an infection in another part of the body or increased fat tissue around the replaced joint. Surgical factors that may lead to an increased risk of PJIs include wound dehiscence (unplanned opening of the surgical wound after the surgery) and hematoma (collection of blood) formation.

The presence of multiple artificial joints, MRSA PJIs, rheumatoid arthritis or bacteremia place people at risk for multiple PJIs (either concurrent or subsequent infections).

Prolonged operative times, in which the joint is left open to the external environment, determined as greater than 90 minutes in a single study, also increases the risk for PJIs.

== Pathophysiology ==
Prosthetic joint infections are generally difficult to treat as most causative organisms form a biofilm, or a thickly adherent membrane, against the artificial joint surface. The bacteria secrete adhesion proteins which help them attach to each other and to the joint surface. The bacteria then secrete autoinducer proteins that act as bacterial signals which facilitate the secretion of an intricate extracellular matrix, the biofilm. Biofilms greatly decrease antibiotic penetrance thereby shielding bacteria from the bacteriocidal effects of antibiotics. Biofilms usually take 4 weeks to fully mature. Granulocytes have decreased phagocytic activity encountering the biofilm, also allowing the bacteria to persist.

== Diagnosis ==
The presence of a PJI is confirmed when one of the proposed major diagnostic criteria are met:

- A sinus tract connecting the joint to the skin
- Purulence around the prosthesis
- Greater than 2000 leukocytes per μL or greater than 70% granulocytes in joint fluid analysis
- The presence of greater than 23 granulocytes per 10 high powered fields on joint fluid analysis (suggesting acute inflammation)
- Microbial growth in a culture of the joint fluid, in at least 2 tissue biopsies (or 1 tissue biopsy if the organism identified is highly virulent) collected from the tissue surrounding the artificial joint or greater than 50 colony forming units per mL on culture from sonification fluid from the artificial joint.
  - Sonification refers to the process where the prosthetic joint is removed from the body, placed in a liquid medium and then bombarded with ultrasound waves to dislodge any microorganisms that are adhering to the artificial joint. The resulting fluid, the sonicate, is then cultured.
  - Sonification has superior sensitivity to culture of the joint fluid in the diagnosis of PJI

Polymerase chain reaction testing of the joint fluid or sonification fluid may aid in the diagnosis.

Skin swabs, sinus tract swabs, swabbing of the artificial joint surface during surgery is not recommended due to the high risk of contaminants and low diagnostic yield (including the risk of contaminants rather than the pathologic organism being cultured).

Blood cultures are positive in approximately 25% of cases of PJIs, especially in acute PJI, however, the organism isolated from blood culture does not always correlate to the organisms isolated from the joint fluid, and therefore blood cultures are not diagnostic of PJIs.

Routine blood work attempting to identify infection including elevated white blood cells on a complete blood count, elevated inflammatory markers (erythrocyte sedimentation rate and C-reactive protein) or procalcitonin are not sensitive nor specific in diagnosis PJIs.

Plain radiography (X-ray) has a low sensitivity and specificity for diagnosing PJI but it may show radiolucent lines around the prosthetic joint, bone breakdown, loosening or migration of the prosthetic joint. Functional imaging tests such as white blood cell Scintigraphy or PET scan may help to identify hypermetabolic areas consistent with infection and aid with the diagnosis.

Magnetic resonance imaging is specific to soft tissue infections, with metal artifact reduction sequence (MARS) MRIs having great utility to aid in the diagnosis of PJIs.

Diagnosing PJI remains a challenge which is illustrated by the continuous updates of the definition of PJI.

== Treatment ==
Antibiotic treatment alone, without surgical debridement, usually results in treatment failure. Acute infections (in which the biofilm is thought to be immature) are usually treated using the DAIR technique; debridement, systemic and local antibiotics, and implant retention (the implant is not removed). However, the mobile, easily interchangeable components of the implant are often replaced in the DAIR approach. DAIR is contraindicated if there is a sinus tract, loosening of the prosthesis, or the surgical wound cannot be closed. The microbial cure rate of DAIR is 74%, 49% and 44% in early, sub-acute and late infections respectively. PJIs caused by fungi or pathogens with resistance to common antibiotic treatment are less likely to get eradicated by DAIR.

Antibiotic loaded polymethylmethacrylate (PMMA) which are placed in the joint are helpful, however these non-resorbable beads may themselves be colonized by bacteria with an associated biofilm, therefore bio-absorbable local antibiotic carriers (calcium sulfate beads, resorbable gentamicin sponges) are preferred. Additionally, more recent studies show that bone grafting can be used as an antibiotic carrier, and impacted bone grafting (IBG) impregnated with antibiotics can achieve much higher local concentrations of antibiotics than the minimum inhibitory concentration (MIC).

Chronic PJIs may be treated using 1 stage revisions, where the artificial joint is replaced with a new one during the same surgical procedure, or with a 2-stage revision; in which the infected joint is removed and an antibiotic spacer is placed, this is followed by a second surgery in which a new artificial joint is placed. Two step revisions are associated with increased morbidity, longer hospital stays, longer immobilization time, worse functional outcomes and higher costs. Therefore, for intact, or mostly intact bone and soft tissue, and without a history of joint replacement revisions; a 1 step exchange is the treatment of choice. In the case of hip PJIs both kinds of surgery are equally effective but one-stage surgery results in faster recovery.

Negative pressure wound therapy is not recommended as the sponges used are often themselves colonized by the biofilm or by new organisms from the environment (including multi-drug resistant organisms).

An extended course of antibiotics is required in PJIs, usually 6–12 weeks of antibiotic therapy. Intravenous antibiotics are initially used and then transitioned to oral antibiotics. A strategy of surgical debridement to decrease the bacterial load prior to starting systemic antibiotics is sometimes employed. Common practice involves switching to oral antibiotics after 14 days. Intravenous ampicillin-sulbactam or amoxicillin with clavulanic acid with vancomycin added in cases of MRSA is a commonly employed empiric antibiotic treatment strategy.

If surgery fails or the PJI persists despite optimal antibiotic therapy, resection arthroplasty of the hip with a pseudarthrosis (Femoral head ostectomy) is sometimes done. Or in cases of knee PJIs failing treatment; an arthrodesis (artificial induction of ossification of the knee joint) is done. These are considered last line therapies due to significant disability.

== Prevention ==
Antibiotic prophylaxis, or giving small doses of antibiotics as a preventative measure, during the perioperative period (usually less than 60 minutes prior to the start of joint replacements)(usually using second generation cephalosporins) is believed to reduce the risk of acute PJIs.

Screening for and eradication of MRSA carriage and chlorhexidine wipes or soap and water skin cleansing prior to surgery may possibly decrease the risk of PJIs.

According to the American Dental Association: in patients with prosthetic joint implants, prophylactic antibiotics prior to routine dental procedures are generally not recommended in the prevention of PJI. However specific circumstances placing patients at higher risk, as determined by the dentist or other physicians, may warrant antibiotic prophylaxis.

== Prognosis ==
The 5-year mortality after hip PJIs is 21%, which is 4 times that of age adjusted controls. And the 10 year mortality after hip PJIs was 45%, as compared to 29% in people with non-infected hip replacements. 25% of people with PJIs have an unplanned re-operation within 1 year of PJI treatment. Hospital stays are longer in those with knee and hip PJIs as compared to un-infected knee and hip replacement controls; at 5.3 vs 3 days (knee) and 7.6 vs 3.3 days (hip).

== Epidemiology ==
PJIs are the most common cause of knee replacement failures, and the third most common cause of hip replacement failures. As of 2017, 2.1% of hip and 2.3% of knee replacements will at some time develop a PJI. The incidence of PJIs have more than tripled in the last 20 years, with the incidence expected to further increase in the future. This increase is believed to be due to the much greater number of hip and knee arthroplasties being performed presently.
