= Acidipropionibacterium virtanenii =

Scientific classification
- Domain: Bacteria
- Kingdom: Bacillati
- Phylum: Actinomycetota
- Class: Actinomycetia
- Order: Propionibacteriales
- Family: Propionibacteriaceae
- Genus: Acidipropionibacterium
- Species: A. virtanenii

Binomial name
- Acidipropionibacterium virtanenii Deptula et al. 2018

Type strain
- JS278

Genus of bacteria

Acidipropionibacterium virtanenii is a Gram-positive bacterium from the genus of Acidipropionibacterium which has been isolated from malted barley from Finland.
