= Microlunatus lacustris =

Scientific classification
- Domain: Bacteria
- Kingdom: Bacillati
- Phylum: Actinomycetota
- Class: Actinomycetia
- Order: Propionibacteriales
- Family: Propionibacteriaceae
- Genus: Microlunatus
- Species: M. lacustris

Binomial name
- Microlunatus lacustris (Lawson et al. 2000) Nouioui et al. 2018

Type strain
- EL-17A^{T} DSM 11465^{T}

Synonyms
- Friedmanniella lacustris Lawson et al. 2000

Species of bacterium

Microlunatus lacustris is a species of Gram-positive, non-motile and aerobic bacteria.
