= Auraticoccus monumenti =

Scientific classification
- Domain: Bacteria
- Kingdom: Bacillati
- Phylum: Actinomycetota
- Class: Actinomycetia
- Order: Propionibacteriales
- Family: Propionibacteriaceae
- Genus: Auraticoccus
- Species: A. monumenti

Binomial name
- Auraticoccus monumenti Alonso-Vega et al. 2011

Type strain
- CECT 7672; DSM 23257; JCM 18954; LMG 25551; MON 2.2; DSM 23257; Trujillo MON 2.2

Species of bacterium

Auraticoccus monumenti is a Gram-positive and strictly aerobic bacterium from the genus Auraticoccus which has been isolated from a sandstone monument in Salamanca, Spain.
