= Luteococcus sanguinis =

Scientific classification
- Domain: Bacteria
- Kingdom: Bacillati
- Phylum: Actinomycetota
- Class: Actinomycetia
- Order: Propionibacteriales
- Family: Propionibacteriaceae
- Genus: Luteococcus
- Species: L. sanguinis

Binomial name
- Luteococcus sanguinis Collins et al. 2003

Type strain
- CCUG 33897; CIP 107216; JCM 12371

Species of bacterium

Luteococcus sanguinis is a Gram-positive bacterium from the genus Luteococcus which has been isolated from human blood in Sundsvall, Sweden.
