= Luteococcus japonicus =

Scientific classification
- Domain: Bacteria
- Kingdom: Bacillati
- Phylum: Actinomycetota
- Class: Actinomycetia
- Order: Propionibacteriales
- Family: Propionibacteriaceae
- Genus: Luteococcus
- Species: L. peritonei

Binomial name
- Luteococcus peritonei Tamura et al. 1994

Type strain
- ATCC 51526; CCUG 38731; CIP 104067; DSM 10546; IFO 12422; IMSNU 21283; JCM 9415; KCTC 9794; NBRC 12422; NCIMB 13388; NRIC 1092; OUT 8086; VKM Ac-1951

Species of bacterium

Luteococcus japonicus is a Gram-positive and non-motile bacterium from the genus Luteococcus which has been isolated from soil in Japan.
