= Cutibacterium namnetense =

Scientific classification
- Domain: Bacteria
- Kingdom: Bacillati
- Phylum: Actinomycetota
- Class: Actinomycetia
- Order: Propionibacteriales
- Family: Propionibacteriaceae
- Genus: Cutibacterium
- Species: C. namnetense

Binomial name
- Cutibacterium namnetense (Aubin et al. 2016) Nouioui et al. 2018

Type strain
- CCUG 66358; DSM 29427; NTS 31307302

Synonyms
- Propionibacterium namnetense Aubin et al. 2016

Species of bacterium

Cutibacterium namnetense is a Gram-positive, anaerobic, pleomorphic and rod-shaped bacterium from the genus Cutibacterium which has been isolated from a samples of human bone infection in Nantes, France.
