= Naumannella halotolerans =

Scientific classification
- Domain: Bacteria
- Kingdom: Bacillati
- Phylum: Actinomycetota
- Class: Actinomycetia
- Order: Propionibacteriales
- Family: Propionibacteriaceae
- Genus: Naumannella
- Species: N. halotolerans

Binomial name
- Naumannella halotolerans Rieser et al. 2012

Type strain
- DSM 24323; JCM 30997; LMG 26184; WS4616

Species of bacterium

Naumannella halotolerans is a Gram-positive and aerobic bacterium from the genus Naumannella which has been isolated from a pharmaceutical clean room and milk products in Sachsen-Anhalt, Germany.
