= Tessaracoccus aquimaris =

Scientific classification
- Domain: Bacteria
- Kingdom: Bacillati
- Phylum: Actinomycetota
- Class: Actinomycetia
- Order: Propionibacteriales
- Family: Propionibacteriaceae
- Genus: Tessaracoccus
- Species: T. aquimaris

Binomial name
- Tessaracoccus aquimaris Tak et al. 2018

Type strain
- NSG39; JCM 19289; KACC 17540

Species of bacterium

Tessaracoccus aquimaris is a Gram-positive, aerobic and non-motile bacterium from the genus Tessaracoccus which has been isolated from the intestine of the rockfish Sebastes schlegelii from a marine aquaculture pond.
