= Theodor Rosebury =

British-American bacteriologist and author (1904–1976)

- Born: 10 August 1904; London, England
- Died: 25 November 1976 (aged 72); Conway, Massachusetts, U.S.
- Citizenship: United States (after 1916)
- Education: University of Pennsylvania (DDS)
- Occupations: Bacteriologist; author

Theodor Rosebury (10 August 1904 – 25 November 1976) was a British-born American bacteriologist and author. He has been called the “pre-eminent oral microbiologist of his era” and the “Grandfather of Modern Oral Microbiology”.

== Early life ==
Rosebury was born on 10 August 1904 in London.

He became a naturalized U.S. citizen in 1916 and attended the University of Pennsylvania (DDS, 1928).

== Career ==
He was chief of the Airborne Infection project at Fort Detrick, Maryland, during World War II. He conducted research in Alaska with Leuman Maurice Waugh (1877–1972), a dentist, explorer, and lecturer. He was a professor at Columbia University College of Dental Medicine. He later resided in Chicago. He ended his career as an Emeritus Professor of bacteriology at Washington University in St. Louis.

== Later life and death ==
After retirement, he dedicated himself to writing, cabinetmaking, and music, playing the flute.

He died at his home in Conway, Massachusetts, on 25 November 1976 at the age of 72.

== Works ==
- Experimental Air-Borne Infection: Equipment and Methods for the Quantitative Study of Highly Infective Agents... / by T. Rosebury with the co-authorship and assistance of the staff of the laboratories of Camp Detrick, Maryland. Balt., Williams and Wilkins, 1947 bibl., illus.
- Theodor Rosebury and Elvin A. Kabat (1947), "Bacterial Warfare: A Critical Analysis of the Available Agents, Their Possible Military Applications, and the Means for Protection Against Them", Journal of Immunology 56, 1, (May 1947): pp 7–96.
- Peace or Pestilence? Biological Warfare and How to Avoid It (1949), New York City: McGraw-Hill.
- Microorganisms Indigenous to Man (1962), New York: McGraw-Hill Book Company.
- Life on Man (1969), New York: The Viking Press.
- Microbes and Morals: The Strange Story of Venereal Disease (1971), New York: The Viking Press.

== Accolades ==
- Fellow, American Association for the Advancement of Science
- Member, International Association for Dental Research
- Member, American Society for Microbiology
- Member, the Harvey Society
- Member, American Public Health Association
- Diplomate, American Academy of Microbiology
