= Tessaracoccus arenae =

Scientific classification
- Domain: Bacteria
- Kingdom: Bacillati
- Phylum: Actinomycetota
- Class: Actinomycetia
- Order: Propionibacteriales
- Family: Propionibacteriaceae
- Genus: Tessaracoccus
- Species: T. arenae

Binomial name
- Tessaracoccus arenae Thongphrom et al. 2017

Type strain
- CAU 1319; KCTC 39760; BRC 111973

Species of bacterium

Tessaracoccus arenae is a Gram-positive, facultatively anaerobic, non-spore-forming and non-motile bacterium from the genus Tessaracoccus which has been isolated from sea sand.
