= Tessaracoccus coleopterorum =

Scientific classification
- Domain: Bacteria
- Kingdom: Bacillati
- Phylum: Actinomycetota
- Class: Actinomycetia
- Order: Propionibacteriales
- Family: Propionibacteriaceae
- Genus: Tessaracoccus
- Species: T. coleopterorum

Binomial name
- Tessaracoccus coleopterorum Hyun et al. 2021

Type strain
- HDW20; JCM 33674; KACC 21348; KCTC 49324

Species of bacterium

Tessaracoccus coleopterorum is a Gram-positive, coccus-shaped, facultatively anaerobic and non-motile bacterium from the genus Tessaracoccus which has been isolated from the intestine of a dark diving beetle.
