= Tessaracoccus bendigoensis =

Scientific classification
- Domain: Bacteria
- Kingdom: Bacillati
- Phylum: Actinomycetota
- Class: Actinomycetia
- Order: Propionibacteriales
- Family: Propionibacteriaceae
- Genus: Tessaracoccus
- Species: T. bendigoensis

Binomial name
- Tessaracoccus bendigoensis Maszenan et al. 1999

Type strain
- ACM 5119; Ben 106; DSM 12906; JCM 13525; KSBR1

Species of bacterium

Tessaracoccus bendigoensis is a Gram-positive bacterium from the genus Tessaracoccus which has been isolated from activated sludge in Bendigo, Australia.
