= Tessaracoccus massiliensis =

Scientific classification
- Domain: Bacteria
- Kingdom: Bacillati
- Phylum: Actinomycetota
- Class: Actinomycetia
- Order: Propionibacteriales
- Family: Propionibacteriaceae
- Genus: Tessaracoccus
- Species: T. massiliensis

Binomial name
- Tessaracoccus massiliensis Seck et al. 2016

Type strain
- CSUR P1301; DSM 29060; SIT-7

Species of bacterium

"Tessaracoccus massiliensis" is a Gram-positive, facultatively anaerobic, rod-shaped, non-spore-forming and non-motile bacterium from the genus Tessaracoccus which has been isolated from the human gut of a Nigerian child suffering from kwashiorkor.
