= Mariniluteicoccus =

Scientific classification
- Domain: Bacteria
- Kingdom: Bacillati
- Phylum: Actinomycetota
- Class: Actinomycetes
- Order: Propionibacteriales
- Family: Propionibacteriaceae
- Genus: Mariniluteicoccus; Zhang et al. 2014

Type species
- Mariniluteicoccus flavus Zhang et al. 2014

Species
- M. endophyticus Liu et al. 2016; M. flavus Zhang et al. 2014

Genus of bacteria

Mariniluteicoccus is a bacterial genus from the family Propionibacteriaceae.
