= Tessaracoccus lubricantis =

Scientific classification
- Domain: Bacteria
- Kingdom: Bacillati
- Phylum: Actinomycetota
- Class: Actinomycetes
- Order: Propionibacteriales
- Family: Propionibacteriaceae
- Genus: Tessaracoccus
- Species: T. lubricantis

Binomial name
- Tessaracoccus lubricantis Kämpfer et al. 2009

Type strain
- CCUG 55516; DSM 19926; KSS-17Se

Species of bacterium

Tessaracoccus lubricantis is a Gram-positive, non-spore-forming and non-motile bacterium from the genus Tessaracoccus which has been isolated from metalworking fluid in Giessen, Germany.
