= Tessaracoccus terricola =

Scientific classification
- Domain: Bacteria
- Kingdom: Bacillati
- Phylum: Actinomycetota
- Class: Actinomycetia
- Order: Propionibacteriales
- Family: Propionibacteriaceae
- Genus: Tessaracoccus
- Species: T. terricola

Binomial name
- Tessaracoccus terricola Chaudhary and Kim 2018

Type strain
- Brt-A; JCM 32157; KACC 19391; KEMB 9005-690

Species of bacterium

Tessaracoccus terricola is a Gram-positive, rod-shaped and non-motile bacterium from the genus of Tessaracoccus which has been isolated from soil which was contaminated with oil.
