= Aestuariimicrobium =

Scientific classification
- Domain: Bacteria
- Kingdom: Bacillati
- Phylum: Actinomycetota
- Class: Actinomycetes
- Order: Propionibacteriales
- Family: Propionibacteriaceae
- Genus: Aestuariimicrobium; Jung et al. 2007

Type species
- Aestuariimicrobium kwangyangense Jung et al. 2007

Species
- A. ganziense; A. kwangyangense; A. soli

Genus of bacteria

Aestuariimicrobium is a singleton genus in the phylum Actinomycetota (Bacteria), whose first member, namely Aestuariimicrobium kwangyangense, was isolated from a diesel contaminated coastal site. Like all Actinobacteria, it is gram-positive and with a high CG content (69%). It is rod/coccoid shaped bacterium whose main quinone is menaquinone-7 (MK7).

== Phylogeny ==
The currently accepted taxonomy is based on the List of Prokaryotic names with Standing in Nomenclature (LPSN) and National Center for Biotechnology Information (NCBI).

16S rRNA based LTP_10_2024

- Aestuariimicrobium
  - A. kwangyangense
  - A. soli Chen et al. 2018

120 marker proteins based GTDB 10-RS226

- Aestuariimicrobium
  - A. ganziense Geng et al. 2024
  - A. kwangyangense Jung et al. 2007

== See also ==
- List of bacterial orders
- List of bacteria genera
