= Tessaracoccus oleiagri =

Scientific classification
- Domain: Bacteria
- Kingdom: Bacillati
- Phylum: Actinomycetota
- Class: Actinomycetia
- Order: Propionibacteriales
- Family: Propionibacteriaceae
- Genus: Tessaracoccus
- Species: T. oleiagri

Binomial name
- Tessaracoccus oleiagri Cai et al. 2011

Type strain
- CGMCC 1.9159; DSM 22955; LMG 25428; LMG 25487; SL014B-20A1; Wu SL014B-20A1

Species of bacterium

Tessaracoccus oleiagri is a bacterium from the genus Tessaracoccus which has been isolated from crude oil contaminated saline soil from the Shengli Oilfield.
