= Raineyella =

Scientific classification
- Domain: Bacteria
- Kingdom: Bacillati
- Phylum: Actinomycetota
- Class: Actinomycetes
- Order: Propionibacteriales
- Family: Propionibacteriaceae
- Genus: Raineyella; Pikuta et al. 2016

Type species
- Raineyella antarctica Pikuta et al. 2016

Species
- R. antarctica; R. fluvialis

Genus of bacteria

Raineyella is a bacterial genus from the family Propionibacteriaceae.

== Phylogeny ==
The currently accepted taxonomy is based on the List of Prokaryotic names with Standing in Nomenclature (LPSN) and National Center for Biotechnology Information (NCBI).

16S rRNA based LTP_10_2024

- Raineyella
  - R. antarctica Pikuta et al. 2016
  - R. fluvialis Kim et al. 2020

120 marker proteins based GTDB 10-RS226

- Raineyella
  - R. antarctica
  - R. fluvialis

== See also ==
- List of bacterial orders
- List of bacteria genera
