= Tessaracoccus lapidicaptus =

Scientific classification
- Domain: Bacteria
- Kingdom: Bacillati
- Phylum: Actinomycetota
- Class: Actinomycetes
- Order: Propionibacteriales
- Family: Propionibacteriaceae
- Genus: Tessaracoccus
- Species: T. lapidicaptus

Binomial name
- Tessaracoccus lapidicaptus Puente-Sánchez et al. 2014

Type strain
- CECT 8385; DSM 27266; IPBSL-7

Species of bacterium

Tessaracoccus lapidicaptus is a facultatively anaerobic, Gram-positive, non-spore-forming and non-motile bacterium from the genus Tessaracoccus which has been isolated from the deep subsurface of the Iberian pyrite belt from Peña de Hierro, Spain.
