= Granulicoccus phenolivorans =

Scientific classification
- Domain: Bacteria
- Kingdom: Bacillati
- Phylum: Actinomycetota
- Class: Actinomycetia
- Order: Propionibacteriales
- Family: Propionibacteriaceae
- Genus: Granulicoccus; Maszenan et al. 2007
- Species: G. phenolivorans

Binomial name
- Granulicoccus phenolivorans Maszenan et al. 2007

Type strain
- ATCC BAA-1292; DSM 17626; JCM 15570; PG-02

Species of bacterium

Granulicoccus phenolivorans is a Gram-positive and phenol-degrading bacterium which has been isolated from phenolic wastewater in Singapore.
