= Propionicimonas =

Scientific classification
- Domain: Bacteria
- Kingdom: Bacillati
- Phylum: Actinomycetota
- Class: Actinomycetes
- Order: Propionibacteriales
- Family: Propionibacteriaceae
- Genus: Propionicimonas; Akasaka et al. 2003

Type species
- Propionicimonas paludicola Akasaka et al. 2003

Species
- P. ferrireducens; P. paludicola

Genus of bacteria

Propionicimonas is a Gram-positive, non-spore-forming and facultatively anaerobic bacterial genus from the family Propionibacteriaceae.

== Phylogeny ==
The currently accepted taxonomy is based on the List of Prokaryotic names with Standing in Nomenclature (LPSN) and National Center for Biotechnology Information (NCBI).

16S rRNA based LTP_10_2024

- Propionicimonas
  - P. ferrireducens Zhou et al. 2018
  - P. paludicola Akasaka et al. 2003

120 marker proteins based GTDB 10-RS226

- Propionicimonas
  P. paludicola

== See also ==
- List of bacterial orders
- List of bacteria genera
