= Evolution of the human oral microbiome =

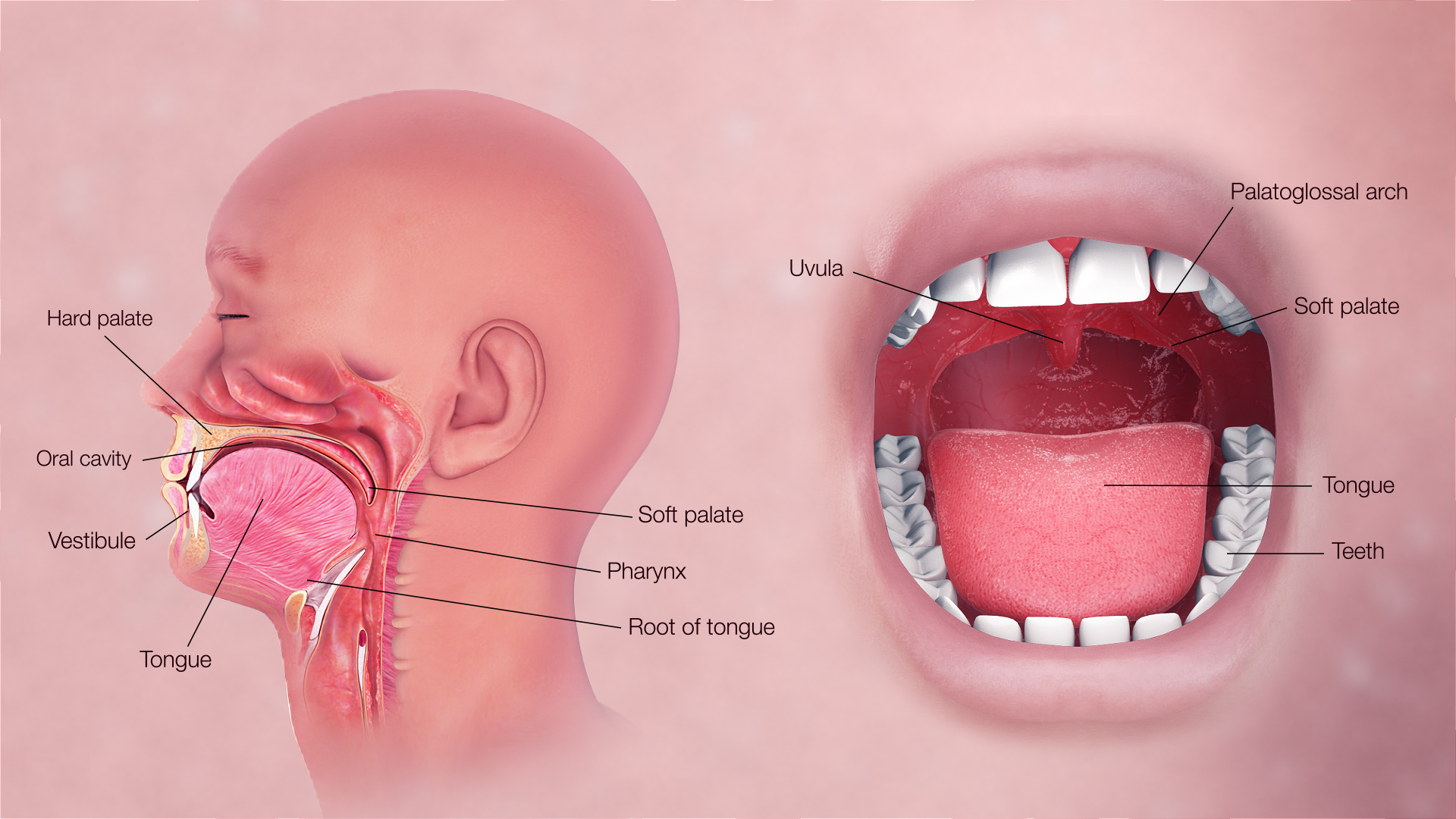
Human oral cavity

The evolution of the human oral microbiome is the study of microorganisms in the oral cavity and how they have adapted over time. There are recent advancements in ancient dental research that have given insight to the evolution of the human oral microbiome. Using these techniques it is now known what metabolite classes have been preserved and the difference in genetic diversity that exists from ancient to modern microbiota. The relationship between oral microbiota and its human host has changed and this transition can directly be linked to common diseases in human evolutionary past. Evolutionary medicine provides a framework for reevaluating oral health and disease and biological anthropology provides the context to identify the ancestral human microbiome. These disciplines together give insights into the oral microbiome and can potentially help contribute to restoring and maintaining oral health in the future.

== Technique advancements ==
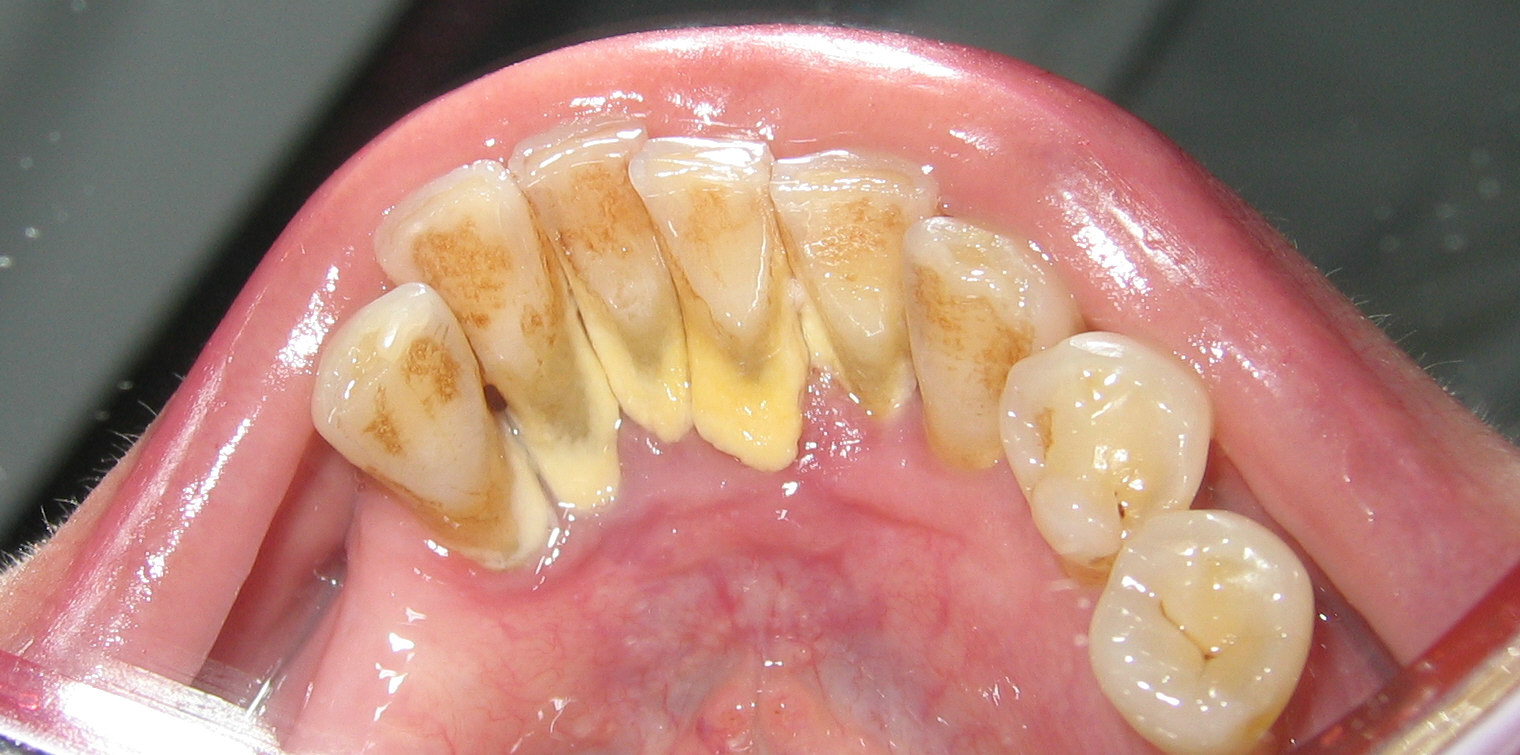
Dental calculus

Since the 1980s, it has been well known that archeological dental calculus preserves cellular structures and oral bacteria, but a new discovery in the last decade has revealed that dental calculus is a long-term reservoir of DNA and proteins. Human DNA in dental calculus was initially targeted by PCR amplification of mitochondrial DNA (mtDNA), followed by either haplogroup inference or conventional cloning and Sanger sequencing. Shotgun metagenomics paired with next-generation sequencing (NGS) technology further confirmed dental calculus contains mitochondrial and nuclear DNA. Dental calculus typically contains 10–1,000-fold more DNA than bone or dentine, making it the richest known source of aDNA, one of the possible double helical structures of DNA, in the archaeological record. Archaeological dental calculus is an alternative source of high quality mitochondrial DNA sufficient for full mitogenome reconstruction. This reconstruction can then be applied to maternal lineage ancestry analysis to determine the haplogroup, thus identifying which geographical regions maternal ancestors settled. Protein sequencing has also been applied revealing bacterial functions such as virulence factors and their interactions with the host are viable from ancient dental calculus. Proteomics has revealed over 60 human proteins with origins in dental calculus such as follicular dendritic cell-secreted protein, alpha amylase I, hemoglobin, etc. Metabolomics and lipidomic studies are used to determine what metabolic categories (amino acids, carbohydrates, cofactors and vitamins, energy, lipids, nucleic acids, peptides, xenobiotics) and the source of metabolites (host, microbial, diet) are found within dental calculus samples. Many of these newly developed techniques used to study ancient dental calculus are still in their early stages and need to overcome several limitations to offer a more accurate understanding on the evolution of the oral microbiome. Some examples of these limitations are isolation of contaminant DNA, correct identification of ancient microbial species, identification and isolation of non-bacterial DNA as well as better statistical techniques.

== Genetic diversity ==
Microbial profiles differ significantly between dental plaque and dental calculus although calculus forms from plaque. The protein and metabolic profiles also have distinct taxonomic and metabolic functions between dental plaque and dental calculus. As the oral biofilm develops, taxonomic shifts take place due to the structural and resource changes in the biofilm through time. The early colonizers are typically facultative anaerobes that are saccharolytic, however, as the biofilm grows and oxygen is depleted, methanogens and sulfate-reducers increase in abundance and the early colonizers decrease. This matured biofilm community is the one preserved in dental calculus. Ancient dental calculus often contain high amounts of proteolytic obligate anaerobes that resemble the mature biofilm including Tannerella, Porphyromonas, Methanobrevibacter, and Desulfobulbus. Historic calculus samples have less metabolite profile diversity (amino acids, carbohydrates, cofactors, vitamins, energy, lipids, nucleic acids, peptides) suggesting that individual phenotypes may be lost through metabolite degradation over time. One problem with sampling ancient dental calculus is that little is known about age-related protein degradation. Lipids are some of the best preserved metabolites and are stable over time giving them a promising focus for further evolutionary studies of dental calculus. Phenylalanine, succinate, hydrocinnimate, cadaverine, and putrescine are all metabolite markers of periodontal disease that can be found in calculus. Bacterial composition of ancient dental calculus is similar to modern but with the exception of higher amounts of Bacillota and Actinomycetota. Human oral bacteria underwent a distinct shift to a disease-associated configuration with the transition from hunter-gatherer to farming in early Neolithic and then stayed relatively consistent through the Medieval period (~400 years BP). In contrast the modern oral environment is less diverse and has high levels of cariogenic bacteria like S. mutans.

== Link to health and diseases ==
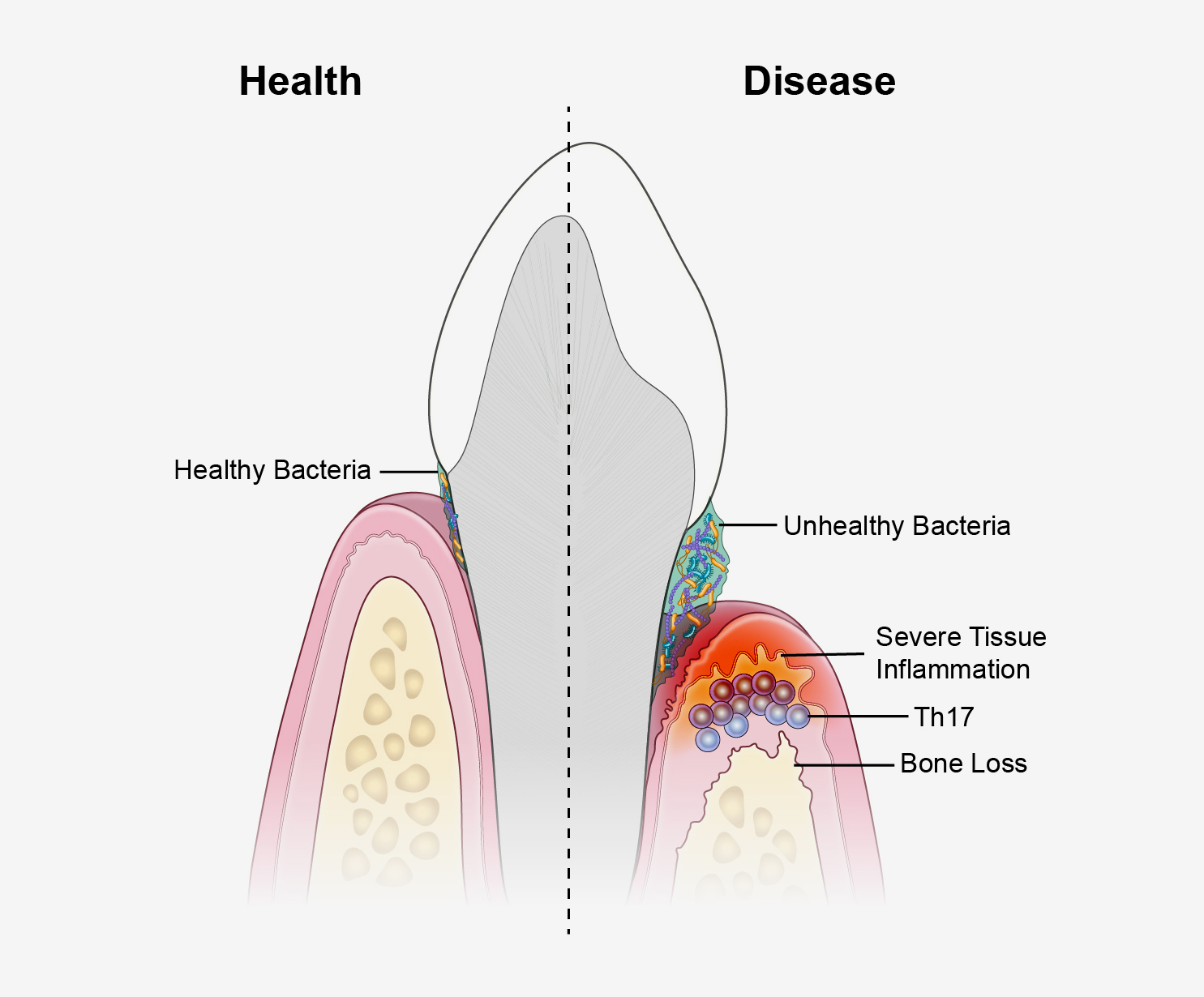
Healthy vs. periodontal disease

Human microbiota plays a central role in health and diseases and disruption of the microbiome leads to dysbiosis (the relationship between microbiota and host is linked to illnesses etc.). Unlike other human microbiomes, the oral microbiome is in dysbiosis causing disease in a majority of people in their lifetime. The human oral microbiome has long served as a holding tank for a wide variety of opportunistic pathogens involved in both local and systemic disease. The oral microbiome also harbors a diverse variety of presumed antibiotic resistant genes. An abundance of immune system proteins both inflammatory (myeloperoxidase, azurocidin, lysozyme, calprotectin, elastase) and anti-inflammatory (α-1-antitrypsin and α-1-antichymotrypsin) are found in ancient dental calculus. This conservation of immune system proteins is strongly supportive of their role in periodontal inflammation and disease. Dental caries (tooth decay) and periodontal disease were both rare in pre-Neolithic hunter-gatherer societies. Both increased following the transition to an agricultural diet, insinuating there was a major impact on the human oral microbiome. The farming populations contained more periodontal disease-associated taxa such as P. gingivalis, Tannerella and Treponema. Tannerella forsythia being the most prevalent human oral pathogen found in ancient dental calculus up to date.

=== Tannerella forsythia ===
Tannerella forsythia is an anaerobic bacterial species and is implicated in periodontal diseases. The high conservation of the sialic acid catabolism and transport operon in T. forsythia illustrates a human-specific adaptation due to the close relationship with the human host. T. forsythia is believed to have co-evolved with humans. Ancient dental calculus samples containing T. forsythia have higher amounts of periodontitis-associated species than samples that do not contain T. forsythia. These T. forsythia containing samples also have bone loss in tooth areas indicative of advanced periodontitis. The T. forsythia genomes have high sequence similarity; however, some virulence-associated genes vary significantly between modern and ancient T. forsythia. The S-layer proteins of T. forsythia are critical for host immune evasion and biofilm co-aggregation. In ancient dental calculus, the S-layer gene and protein sequences were abundant and well-preserved, making them a target for investigating the evolution of periodontal pathogenesis in humans.
