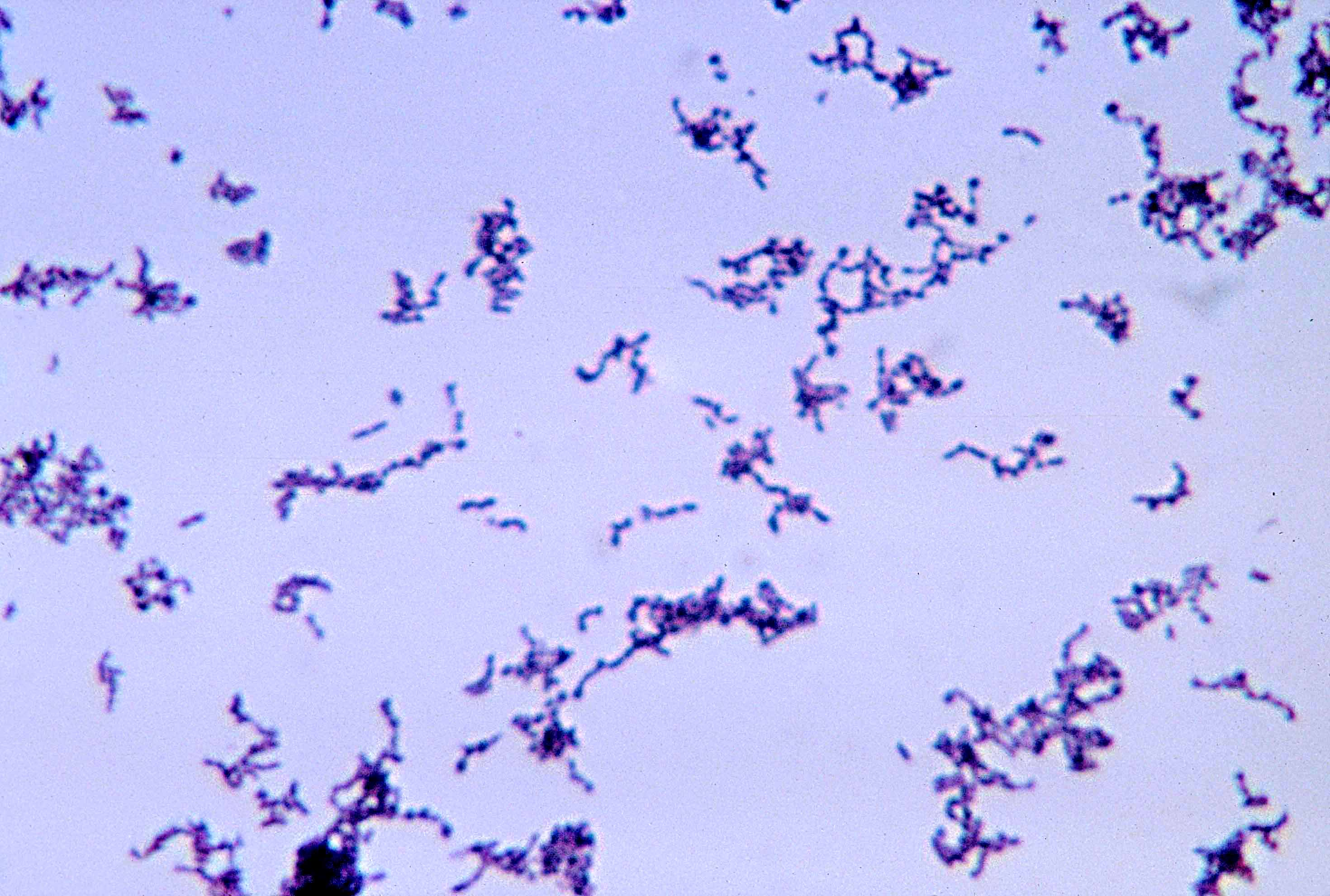

Scientific classification
- Domain: Bacteria
- Kingdom: Bacillati
- Phylum: Actinomycetota
- Class: Actinomycetes
- Order: Propionibacteriales
- Family: Propionibacteriaceae
- Genus: Cutibacterium
- Species: C. acnes

Binomial name
- Cutibacterium acnes Scholz and Kilian, 2016

Subspecies
- subsp. acnes; subsp. defendens; subsp. elongatum

Synonyms
- "Bacillus acnes" Gilchrist 1900; Propionibacterium acnes (Gilchrist 1900) Douglas and Gunter 1946 (Approved Lists 1980)

= Cutibacterium acnes =

Species of bacterium

Cutibacterium acnes (Propionibacterium acnes) is the relatively slow-growing, typically aerotolerant anaerobic, gram-positive bacterium (rod) linked to the skin condition of acne; it can also cause chronic blepharitis and endophthalmitis, the latter particularly following intraocular surgery. Its genome has been sequenced and a study has shown several genes can generate enzymes for degrading skin and proteins that may be immunogenic (activating the immune system).

The species is largely commensal and part of the skin flora present on most healthy adult humans' skin. It is usually just barely detectable on the skin of healthy preadolescents. It lives, among other things, primarily on fatty acids in sebum secreted by sebaceous glands in the follicles. It may also be found throughout the gastrointestinal tract.

Originally identified as Bacillus acnes, it was later named Propionibacterium acnes for its ability to generate propionic acid. In 2016, P. acnes was taxonomically reclassified as a result of biochemical and genomic studies. In terms of both phylogenetic tree structure and DNA G + C content, the cutaneous species was distinguishable from other species that had been previously categorized as P. acnes. As part of restructuring, the novel genus Cutibacterium was created for the cutaneous species, including those formerly identified as Propionibacterium acnes, Propionibacterium avidum, and Propionibacterium granulosum. Characterization of phylotypes of C. acnes is an active field of research.

== Role in diseases ==
=== Acne vulgaris ===
Cutibacterium acnes bacteria predominantly live deep within follicles and pores, although they are also found on the surface of healthy skin. In these follicles, C. acnes bacteria use sebum, cellular debris and metabolic byproducts from the surrounding skin tissue as their primary sources of energy and nutrients. Elevated production of sebum by hyperactive sebaceous glands (sebaceous hyperplasia) or blockage of the follicle can cause C. acnes bacteria to grow and multiply.

Cutibacterium acnes bacteria secrete many proteins, including several digestive enzymes. These enzymes are involved in the digestion of sebum and the acquisition of other nutrients. They can also destabilize the layers of cells that form the walls of the follicle. The cellular damage, metabolic byproducts and bacterial debris produced by the rapid growth of C. acnes in follicles can trigger inflammation. This inflammation can lead to the symptoms associated with some common skin disorders, such as folliculitis and acne vulgaris. Acne vulgaris is the disease most commonly associated with C. acnes infection. C. acnes is one of the most common and universal skin diseases, affecting more than 45 million individuals in the United States. 20% of all dermatologist visits are related to treating acne-related issues. This issue often develops during hormonal periods; however, it is also apparent through early adulthood. There are no quantitative differences between C. acnes of the skin of patients with acne, but the C. acnes phylogenetic groups display distinct genetic and phenotypic characteristics. C. acnes biofilms are also found much more frequently in acne and can induce distinct immune responses to combat against acne.

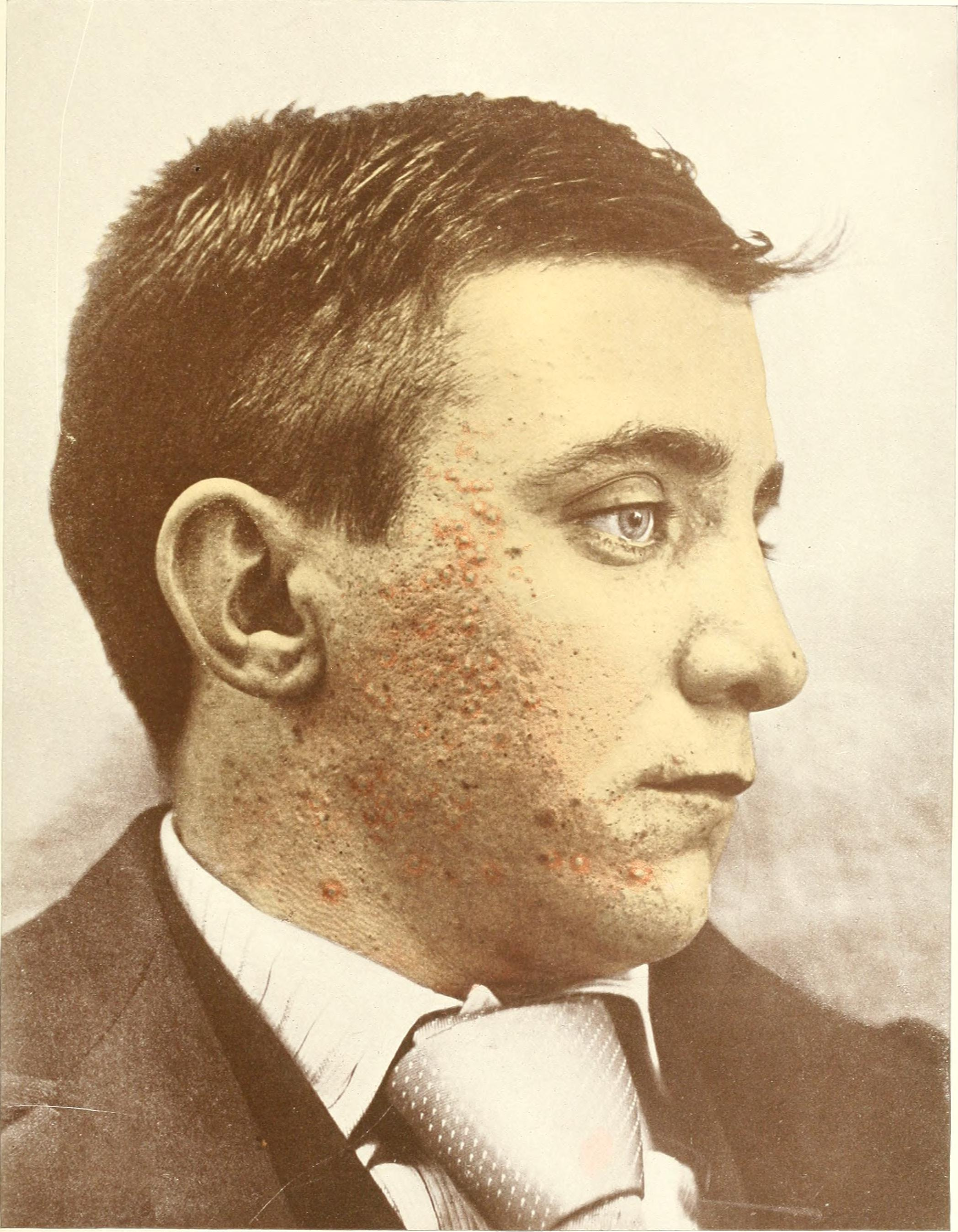
Comedo acne from C. acnes

Acne vulgaris is a chronic inflammatory disease of the pilosebaceous unit, which includes the hair follicle, hair shaft, and sebaceous gland and about 650 million people are affected globally by this disease. C. acnes starts to colonize on the skin around 1 to 3 years prior to puberty and grows exponentially during this time. This is why so many teens and young adults struggle with acne. Prescriptions to treat acne are often antibiotics. However, with the rise of antibiotic resistance, antibiotics are now often combined with broad-spectrum antibacterial agents such as benzoyl peroxide, and other medications like isotretinoin (commonly known by the brand name Accutane) are being used on patients with severe or resistant acne.

=== Staphylococcus epidermidis ===
The damage caused by C. acnes and the associated inflammation make the affected tissue more susceptible to colonization by opportunistic bacteria, such as Staphylococcus aureus. Preliminary research shows healthy pores are only colonized by C. acnes, while unhealthy ones universally include the nonpore-resident Staphylococcus epidermidis, amongst other bacterial contaminants. Whether this is a root causality, just opportunistic and a side effect, or a more complex pathological duality between C. acnes and this particular Staphylococcus species is not known. Current research has pointed to the idea that C. acnes and S. epidermidis have a symbiotic relationship. Both bacteria exist on the normal flora of the skin and a disrupt in balance of these bacteria on the skin can result in acne or other bacterial infection.

In addition to contributing to skin inflammation and acne lesions, an imbalance in these bacteria may also impair the skin's ability to heal and regenerate, leading to prolonged and more severe acne outbreaks. This disruption can also affect the skin's overall microbiome diversity, potentially increasing susceptibility to other skin conditions such as eczema or rosacea. Investigating the dynamics of this relationship may offer insights into novel therapeutic approaches for managing various skin disorders.

=== Ophthalmic complications ===
Cutibacterium acnes is a common cause of chronic endophthalmitis following cataract surgery. The pathogen may also cause corneal ulcers.

=== Disk herniation ===
Cutibacterium acnes has been found in herniated discs. The propionic acid which it secretes creates micro-fractures of the surrounding bone. These micro-fractures are sensitive and it has been found that antibiotics have been helpful in resolving this type of low back pain.

=== Sarcoidosis ===
Cutibacterium acnes can be found in bronchoalveolar lavage of approximately 70% of patients with sarcoidosis and is associated with disease activity, but it can also be found in 23% of controls. The subspecies of C. acnes that cause these infections of otherwise sterile tissues (prior to medical procedures), however, are the same subspecies found on the skin of individuals who do not have acne-prone skin, so are likely local contaminants. Moderate to severe acne vulgaris appears to be more often associated with virulent strains.

=== Opportunistic diseases ===
Cutibacterium acnes is often considered an opportunistic pathogen, causing a range of postoperative and device-related infections, notably e.g., surgical infections, post-neurosurgical infections, infected joint prostheses (especially shoulder), neurosurgical shunt infections and endocarditis in patients with prosthetic heart valves (predominantly men). C. acnes may play a role in other conditions, including SAPHO (synovitis, acne, pustulosis, hyperostosis, osteitis) syndrome, sarcoidosis and sciatica. It is also suspected as a main bacterial source of neuroinflammation in Alzheimer's disease brains. It is a common contaminant in blood and cerebrospinal fluid cultures.

== Antimicrobial susceptibility ==
Cutibacterium acnes bacteria are susceptible to a wide range of antimicrobial molecules, from both pharmaceutical and natural sources. The antibiotics most frequently used to treat acne vulgaris are erythromycin, clindamycin, doxycycline, and minocycline. Several other families of antibiotics are also active against C. acnes bacteria, including quinolones, cephalosporins, pleuromutilins, penicillins, and sulfonamides.

=== Antibiotic resistance ===
The emergence of antibiotic-resistant C. acnes bacteria represents a growing problem worldwide. The problem is especially pronounced in North America and Europe. The antibiotic families that C. acnes are most likely to acquire resistance to are the macrolides (e.g., erythromycin and azithromycin), lincosamides (e.g., clindamycin) and tetracyclines (e.g., doxycycline and minocycline).

However, C. acnes bacteria are susceptible to many types of antimicrobial chemicals found in over-the-counter antibacterial products, including benzoyl peroxide, triclosan, chloroxylenol, and chlorhexidine gluconate.

C. acnes resistance to antibiotics has increased to 64% in 2000, up from 20% in 1979. Treatments such as oral macrolides are often avoided because the bacteria has become resistant in most cases. This creates a public health issue, forcing healthcare providers to seek out other forms of treatment.

==== Treatments ====
Several naturally occurring molecules and compounds are toxic to C. acnes bacteria. Some essential oils such as rosemary, tea tree oil, clove oil, and citrus oils contain antibacterial chemicals. Natural honey has also been shown to have some antibacterial properties that may be active against C. acnes.

The elements silver, sulfur, and copper have also been demonstrated to be toxic towards many bacteria, including C. acnes.

Salicylic acid is a naturally occurring substance derived from plants (white willow bark and wintergreen leaves) used to promote exfoliation of the skin in order to treat acne. Additionally, research investigates the mechanism by which salicylic acid (SA) treats acne vulgaris. A study finds that SA suppresses the AMPK/SREBP1 (AMP-activated protein kinase)(AMPK/SREBP1 pathway is a signaling pathway involved in the regulation of lipid metabolism in sebocytes, which are the cells responsible for producing sebum in the skin) pathway in sebocytes, leading to a decrease in lipid synthesis and sebum production. SA also reduces the inflammatory response of sebocytes and decreases the proliferation of C. acnes. These results suggest that SA has a multifaceted approach in treating acne vulgaris by targeting several key factors that contribute to its development. The minimum inhibitory concentration for SA is 4000–8000 μg/mL.

== Photosensitivity ==
Cutibacterium acnes glows orange when exposed to blacklight, possibly due to the presence of endogenous porphyrins. It is also killed by ultraviolet light. C. acnes is especially sensitive to light in the 405–420 nanometer (near the ultraviolet) range due to an endogenic porphyrin–coporphyrin III. A total radiant exposure of 320 J/cm^{2} inactivates this species in vitro. Its photosensitivity can be enhanced by pretreatment with aminolevulinic acid, which boosts production of this chemical, although this causes significant side effects in humans, and in practice was not significantly better than the light treatment alone.

== Other habitats ==
Cutibacterium acnes has been found to be an endophyte of plants. Notably, grapevine appears to host an endophytic population of C. acnes that is closely related to the human-associated strains. The two lines diverged roughly 7,000 years ago, at about the same time when grapevine agriculture may have been established. This C. acnes subtype was dubbed Zappae in honour of the eccentric composer Frank Zappa, to highlight its unexpected and unconventional habitat.
