= Propioniferax innocua =

Scientific classification
- Domain: Bacteria
- Kingdom: Bacillati
- Phylum: Actinomycetota
- Class: Actinomycetia
- Order: Propionibacteriales
- Family: Propionibacteriaceae
- Genus: Propioniferax; Yokota et al. 1994
- Species: P. innocua

Binomial name
- Propioniferax innocua (Pitcher and Collins 1992) Yokota et al. 1994

Type strain
- ATCC 49929; CCUG 33480; CIP 110011; DSM 8251; JCM 13395; L60; LMG 16732; NCTC 11082

Synonyms
- Propionibacterium innocuum Pitcher and Collins 1992

Species of bacterium

Propioniferax innocua is a Gram-positive, non-spore-forming and non-motile bacterium from the genus Propioniferax which has been isolated from human skin.
