= Microlunatus =

Scientific classification
- Domain: Bacteria
- Kingdom: Bacillati
- Phylum: Actinomycetota
- Class: Actinomycetes
- Order: Propionibacteriales
- Family: Propionibacteriaceae
- Genus: Microlunatus; Nakamura et al. 1995

Type species
- Microlunatus phosphovorus Nakamura et al. 1995

Species
- See text

Synonyms
- Friedmanniella Schumann et al. 1997

Genus of bacteria

Microlunatus is a Gram-positive, non-spore-forming, mesophilic, aerobic and non-motile bacterial genus from the family Propionibacteriaceae.

== Phylogeny ==
The currently accepted taxonomy is based on the List of Prokaryotic names with Standing in Nomenclature (LPSN) and National Center for Biotechnology Information (NCBI).

16S rRNA based LTP_10_2024

- - Microlunatus panaciterrae An, Im & Yoon 2008
  - - Microlunatus
      - M. ginsengisoli Cui et al. 2007
      - - - M. aurantiacus Wang et al. 2008
          - M. phosphovorus Nakamura et al. 1995
        - - - M. parietis Kämpfer et al. 2010
            - - M. nigridraconis Zhang et al. 2016
              - M. speluncae Xie et al. 2020
          - - M. endophyticus Tuo et al. 2016
            - - M. elymi Son et al. 2020
              - M. soli Kämpfer et al. 2010
    - Friedmanniella
      - F. aerolata Kim et al. 2016
      - - - F. lucida Iwai, Aisaka & Suzuki 2010
          - - F. capsulata Maszenan et al. 1999
            - - F. lacustris Lawson et al. 2000
              - F. luteola Iwai, Aisaka & Suzuki 2010
        - - F. flava Zhang et al. 2013
          - - F. antarctica Schumann et al. 1997
            - - F. spumicola Maszenan et al. 1999
              - - F. okinawensis Iwai, Aisaka & Suzuki 2010
                - F. sagamiharensis Iwai, Aisaka & Suzuki 2010

120 marker proteins based GTDB 10-RS226

- - - Microlunatus_A
      - Microlunatus kandeliicorticis
      - - Microlunatus endophyticus
        - - Microlunatus elymi
          - Microlunatus soli
  - - - Microlunatus_B
        - Microlunatus parietis
        - Microlunatus speluncae
    - - - Microlunatus
          - M. ginsengisoli
          - - M. aurantiacus
            - M. phosphovorus
      - - Microlunatus panaciterrae
        - - Friedmanniella
            - - F. lacustris
              - - F. capsulata
                - F. luteola
            - - - F. antarctica
                - F. spumicola
              - - F. flava
                - F. sagamiharensis

Species incertae:

- "M. cavernae" Cheng et al. 2013
- "M. ginsengiterrae" Seo, Lee & Im 2015
- "M. terrae" Lee and Kim 2012

== See also ==
- List of bacterial orders
- List of bacteria genera
