= Propionicicella superfundia =

Scientific classification
- Domain: Bacteria
- Kingdom: Bacillati
- Phylum: Actinomycetota
- Class: Actinomycetia
- Order: Propionibacteriales
- Family: Propionibacteriaceae
- Genus: Propionicicella; Bae et al. 2006
- Species: P. superfundia

Binomial name
- Propionicicella superfundia Bae et al. 2006

Type strain
- ATCC BAA-1218; BL-10; DSM 22317; JCM 14922; LMG 23096; Moe BL-10

Species of bacterium

Propionicicella superfundia is a Gram-positive, facultative anaerobic, rod-shaped and non-motile bacterium which has been isolated from groundwater which was contaminated with chlorosolvents and petroleum hydrocarbons in Baton Rouge in the United States.
