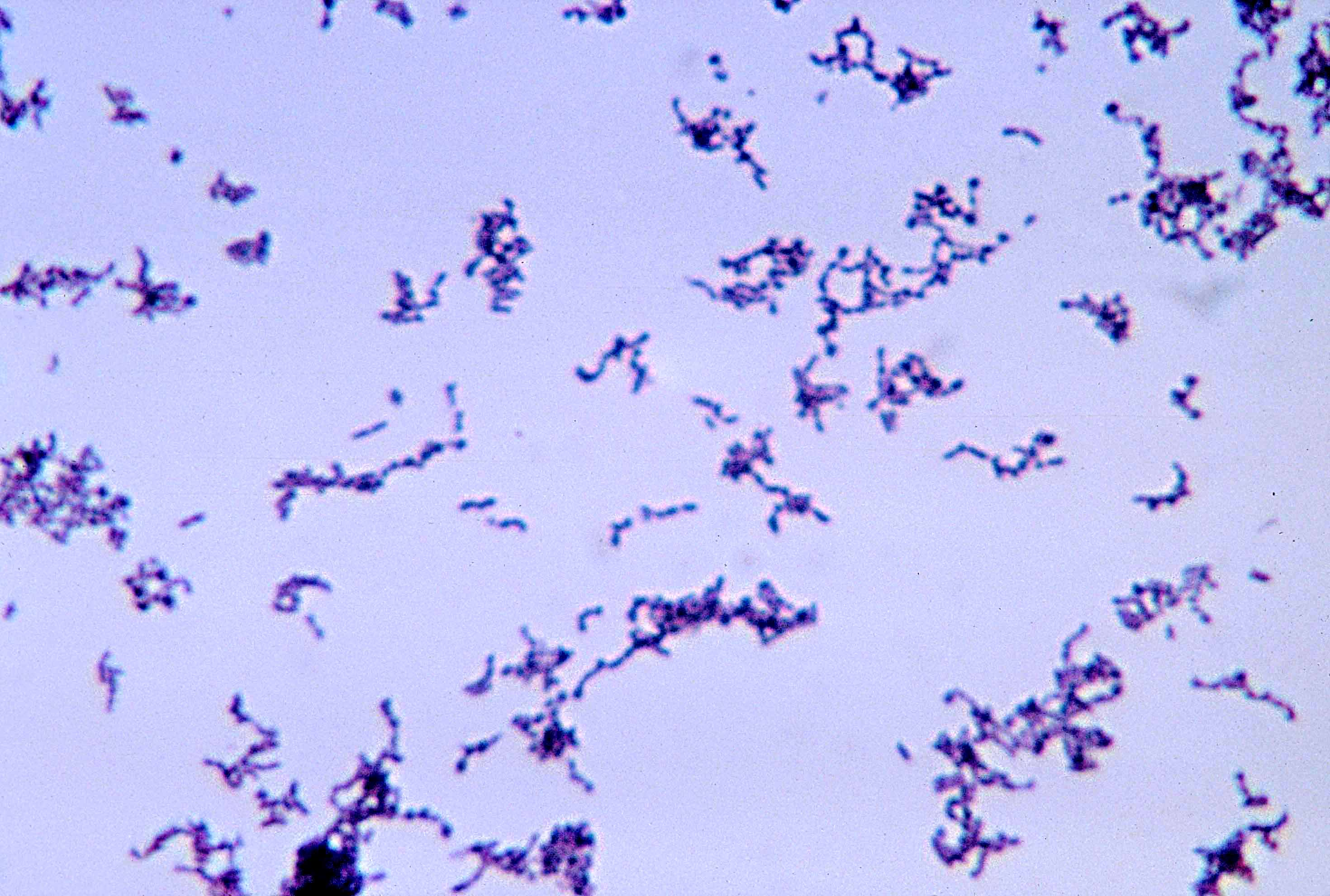
- Cutibacterium acnes

Scientific classification
- Domain: Bacteria
- Kingdom: Bacillati
- Phylum: Actinomycetota
- Class: Actinomycetes
- Order: Propionibacteriales
- Family: Propionibacteriaceae
- Genus: Cutibacterium; Scholz and Kilian 2016

Type species
- Cutibacterium acnes (Gilchrist 1900) Scholz and Kilian 2016

Species
- C. acnes; C. avidum; C. equinum; C. granulosum; C. modestum; C. namnetense; C. porci

= Cutibacterium =

Genus of bacteria

Cutibacterium is a bacterial genus from the family Propionibacteriaceae.

== Phylogeny ==
The currently accepted taxonomy is based on the List of Prokaryotic names with Standing in Nomenclature (LPSN) and National Center for Biotechnology Information (NCBI).

16S rRNA based LTP_10_2024

- - - Cutibacterium granulosum
    - Acidipropionibacterium
  - - Cutibacterium
      - - C. equinum
        - - C. avidum
          - Arachnia propionica
      - - C. porci
        - - C. namnetense
          - - C. modestum
            - C. acnes

120 marker proteins based GTDB 10-RS226

- - Acidipropionibacterium
  - - Cutibacterium
      - - "Acidipropionibacterium timonense" Togo et al. 2019
        - C. granulosum (Prévot 1938) Scholz and Kilian 2016
      - - - C. avidum (Eggerth 1935) Scholz and Kilian 2016
          - C. equinum Yun et al. 2023
        - - - C. modestum Dekio et al. 2020
            - C. porci Wylensek et al. 2021
          - - C. acnes (Gilchrist 1900) Scholz and Kilian 2016
            - C. namnetense (Aubin et al. 2016) Nouioui et al. 2018

== See also ==
- List of bacterial orders
- List of bacteria genera
