= Propioniciclava =

Scientific classification
- Domain: Bacteria
- Kingdom: Bacillati
- Phylum: Actinomycetota
- Class: Actinomycetes
- Order: Propionibacteriales
- Family: Propionibacteriaceae
- Genus: Propioniciclava; Sugawara et al. 2011

Type species
- Propioniciclava tarda Sugawara et al. 2011

Species
- P. coleopterorum; P. flava; P. sinopodophylli; P. soli; P. tarda

Synonyms
- Brevilactibacter Wenning et al. 2020; "Nigerium" Traore et al. 2016

Genus of bacteria

Propioniciclava is a bacterial genus from the family Propionibacteriaceae.

== Phylogeny ==
The currently accepted taxonomy is based on the List of Prokaryotic names with Standing in Nomenclature (LPSN) and National Center for Biotechnology Information (NCBI).

16S rRNA based LTP_10_2024

- Propioniciclava
  - - P. coleopterorum
    - P. flava
  - - P. sinopodophylli
    - - P. soli
      - P. tarda

120 marker proteins based GTDB 10-RS226

- Propioniciclava
  - - "Nigerium massiliense" Traore et al. 2016
    - P. tarda Sugawara et al. 2011
  - - P. soli Li et al. 2022
    - - P. sinopodophylli Zhang et al. 2017
      - - P. coleopterorum (Hyun et al. 2021) Li et al. 2022
        - P. flava (Wenning et al. 2020) Li et al. 2022

== See also ==
- List of bacterial orders
- List of bacteria genera
