= Tessaracoccus rhinocerotis =

Scientific classification
- Domain: Bacteria
- Kingdom: Bacillati
- Phylum: Actinomycetota
- Class: Actinomycetia
- Order: Propionibacteriales
- Family: Propionibacteriaceae
- Genus: Tessaracoccus
- Species: T. rhinocerotis

Binomial name
- Tessaracoccus rhinocerotis Li et al. 2016

Type strain
- CCTCC AB 2013217; DSM 27597; YIM 101269

Species of bacterium

Tessaracoccus rhinocerotis is a Gram-positive, non-spore-forming, facultatively anaerobic and non-motile bacterium from the genus Tessaracoccus which has been isolated from the faeces of the rhino (Rhinoceros unicornis) from the Yunnan Wild Animal Park in China.
