= Tessaracoccus antarcticus =

Scientific classification
- Domain: Bacteria
- Kingdom: Bacillati
- Phylum: Actinomycetota
- Class: Actinomycetes
- Order: Propionibacteriales
- Family: Propionibacteriaceae
- Genus: Tessaracoccus
- Species: T. antarcticus

Binomial name
- Tessaracoccus antarcticus Zhou et al. 2020

Type strain
- JDX10; KCTC 49242; MCCC 1H00351

Species of bacterium

Tessaracoccus antarcticus is a Gram-positive and facultatively anaerobic bacterium from the genus Tessaracoccus which has been isolated from soil from the Fildes Peninsula. Tessaracoccus antarcticus produces rhodopsin.
