= Micropruina glycogenica =

Scientific classification
- Domain: Bacteria
- Kingdom: Bacillati
- Phylum: Actinomycetota
- Class: Actinomycetia
- Order: Propionibacteriales
- Family: Propionibacteriaceae
- Genus: Micropruina; Shintani et al. 2000
- Species: M. glycogenica

Binomial name
- Micropruina glycogenica Shintani et al. 2000

Type strain
- JCM 10248; Lg2

Species of bacterium

Micropruina glycogenica is a Gram-positive and non-spore-forming bacterium which has been isolated from activated sludge in Japan.
