= Tessaracoccus timonensis =

Scientific classification
- Domain: Bacteria
- Kingdom: Bacillati
- Phylum: Actinomycetota
- Class: Actinomycetes
- Order: Propionibacteriales
- Family: Propionibacteriaceae
- Genus: Tessaracoccus
- Species: T. timonensis

Binomial name
- Tessaracoccus timonensis Fall et al. 2019

Type strain
- Marseille-P5995; CSUR P5995

Species of bacterium

"Tessaracoccus timonensis" is a Gram-negative and non-motile bacterium from the genus Tessaracoccus which has been isolated from vaginal swabs from Senegalese women.
