= Auraticoccus =

Scientific classification
- Domain: Bacteria
- Kingdom: Bacillati
- Phylum: Actinomycetota
- Class: Actinomycetes
- Order: Propionibacteriales
- Family: Propionibacteriaceae
- Genus: Auraticoccus; Alonso-Vega et al. 2011

Type species
- Auraticoccus monumenti Alonso-Vega et al. 2011

Species
- A. cholistanensis; A. monumenti

Genus of bacteria

Auraticoccus is a bacterial genus from the family Propionibacteriaceae.

== Phylogeny ==
The currently accepted taxonomy is based on the List of Prokaryotic names with Standing in Nomenclature (LPSN) and National Center for Biotechnology Information (NCBI).

16S rRNA based LTP_10_2024

- Auraticoccus
  - A. cholistanensis Cheema et al. 2020
  - A. monumenti Alonso-Vega et al. 2011

120 marker proteins based GTDB 10-RS226

- Auraticoccus
  - A. cholistanensis
  - A. monumenti

== See also ==
- List of bacterial orders
- List of bacteria genera
