= Luteococcus =

Scientific classification
- Domain: Bacteria
- Kingdom: Bacillati
- Phylum: Actinomycetota
- Class: Actinomycetes
- Order: Propionibacteriales
- Family: Propionibacteriaceae
- Genus: Luteococcus; Tamura et al. 1994

Type species
- Luteococcus japonicus Tamura et al. 1994

Species
- L. japonicus; L. peritonei; L. sanguinis; L. sediminum

Genus of bacteria

Luteococcus is a bacterial genus from the family Propionibacteriaceae.

== Phylogeny ==
The currently accepted taxonomy is based on the List of Prokaryotic names with Standing in Nomenclature (LPSN) and National Center for Biotechnology Information (NCBI).

16S rRNA based LTP_10_2024

- Luteococcus
  - L. japonicus Tamura, Takeuchi & Yokota 1994
  - - L. sanguinis Collins et al. 2003
    - - L. peritonei Collins et al. 2000
      - L. sediminum Fan et al. 2014

120 marker proteins based GTDB 10-RS226

- Luteococcus
  - L. sanguinis [incl. "Ca. L. avicola" Gilroy et al. 2021]
  - - L. peritonei Collins et al. 2000
    - L. japonicus

== See also ==
- List of bacterial orders
- List of bacteria genera
