= Naumannella =

Scientific classification
- Domain: Bacteria
- Kingdom: Bacillati
- Phylum: Actinomycetota
- Class: Actinomycetes
- Order: Propionibacteriales
- Family: Propionibacteriaceae
- Genus: Naumannella; Rieser et al. 2012

Type species
- Naumannella halotolerans Rieser et al. 2012

Species
- N. cuiyingiana; N. halotolerans; N. huperziae

Genus of bacteria

Naumannella is a bacterial genus from the family Propionibacteriaceae. It was first described in 2015 and is named after the German bacteriologist Helmut Naumann, who made significant contributions to the study of anaerobic bacteria. The genus currently consists of a single species, Naumannella halotolerans. This bacterium was isolated from saline soil, indicating its ability to survive in environments with high salt concentrations.

== Phylogeny ==
The currently accepted taxonomy is based on the List of Prokaryotic names with Standing in Nomenclature (LPSN) and National Center for Biotechnology Information (NCBI).

16S rRNA based LTP_10_2024

- Naumannella
  - N. halotolerans Rieser et al. 2012
  - - N. cuiyingiana Tian et al. 2017
    - N. huperziae Sun et al. 2017

120 marker proteins based GTDB 10-RS226

- Naumannella
  - N. cuiyingiana
  - N. halotolerans

== Morphology and Physiology ==
Naumannella halotolerans is a Gram-positive, non-motile bacterium. It is rod-shaped and can form short chains or occur singly. Like other members of the Propionibacteriaceae family, Naumannella is anaerobic, meaning it thrives in environments devoid of oxygen. However, it is halotolerant, capable of growing in high salt concentrations, a trait that distinguishes it from other closely related genera.

== Habitat and Ecology ==
This bacterium was first isolated from saline soils in Germany. Its ability to tolerate high salinity suggests it is well-adapted to extreme environments, such as salt flats, saline lakes, or coastal soil. Its ecological role in such environments is not entirely understood, but it is likely involved in the degradation of organic matter and may play a role in nutrient cycling in saline ecosystems.

== See also ==
- List of bacterial orders
- List of bacteria genera
