= Tessaracoccus flavescens =

Scientific classification
- Domain: Bacteria
- Kingdom: Bacillati
- Phylum: Actinomycetota
- Class: Actinomycetia
- Order: Propionibacteriales
- Family: Propionibacteriaceae
- Genus: Tessaracoccus
- Species: T. flavescens

Binomial name
- Tessaracoccus flavescens Lee and Lee 2008

Type strain
- DSM 18582; JCM 16025; KCTC 19196; SST-39

Species of bacterium

Tessaracoccus flavescens is a Gram-positive, anaerobic, non-spore-forming and non-motile bacterium from the genus Tessaracoccus which has been isolated from beach sediments from Jeju, Korea.
