= Tessaracoccus flavus =

Scientific classification
- Domain: Bacteria
- Kingdom: Bacillati
- Phylum: Actinomycetota
- Class: Actinomycetia
- Order: Propionibacteriales
- Family: Propionibacteriaceae
- Genus: Tessaracoccus
- Species: T. flavus

Binomial name
- Tessaracoccus flavus Kumari et al. 2016

Type strain
- DSM 100159; KCTC 39686; MCC 2769; RP1

Species of bacterium

Tessaracoccus flavus is a Gram-positive, non-spore-forming and non-motile bacterium from the genus Tessaracoccus which has been isolated from a drainage system from a lindane-producing factory in Chinhat, India.
