= Pilot John International =

American aircraft equipment distribution company

- Type: Private
- Industry: Aviation
- Founded: 2001
- Founder: John Werner
- Headquarters: Greenville, North Carolina, United States
- Area served: Worldwide
- Key people: John Werner
- Website: pilotjohn.com

Pilot John International (PJi) is an American company that distributes and supports aircraft parts, avionics test equipment, consumables, and aviation ground support equipment.

== Overview ==
Pilot John International is headquartered in Greenville, North Carolina and also has an aircraft equipment distribution and service center in New Bern, North Carolina. It specializes in providing distribution and service centers for ground support equipment, aircraft components, avionics test equipment, and other aviation-related equipment.

== History ==
The company was founded in 2001 in North Carolina, and was formerly known as Carolina GSE (or Carolina Ground Support Equipment), but was later renamed to Pilot John International (PJi).

Pilot John International's New Bern facility was expanded from 20,000 square feet (1,900 m^{2}) to 40,000 square feet (3,700 m^{2}) sq. ft. in 2022.

Pilot John International has partnered with ACES Systems and KUNZ Aircraft Equipment and other aviation equipment companies. The company also regularly attends National Business Aviation Association events such as the 2022 NBAA White Plains Regional Forum and the 2022 NBAA Business Aviation Convention & Exhibition in Orlando, Florida, as well as Helicopter Association International (HAI) events such as the 2023 HAI Heli-Expo in Atlanta.

John Werner is the chief executive of the company.
