= Brooklawnia cerclae =

Scientific classification
- Domain: Bacteria
- Kingdom: Bacillati
- Phylum: Actinomycetota
- Class: Actinomycetia
- Order: Propionibacteriales
- Family: Propionibacteriaceae
- Genus: Brooklawnia; Rainey et al. 2006
- Species: B. cerclae

Binomial name
- Brooklawnia cerclae Rainey et al. 2006

Type strain
- BL-34; DSM 19609; JCM 14918; LMG 23248; Moe BL-34; NRRL B-41418

Species of bacterium

Brooklawnia cerclae is a Gram-positive, non-spore-forming, facultatively anaerobic and non-motile bacterium which has been isolated from chlorosolvent-contaminated groundwater in Baton Rouge, Louisiana in the United States.
