= Arachnia propionica =

Scientific classification
- Domain: Bacteria
- Kingdom: Bacillati
- Phylum: Actinomycetota
- Class: Actinomycetes
- Order: Propionibacteriales
- Family: Propionibacteriaceae
- Genus: Arachnia
- Species: A. propionica

Binomial name
- Arachnia propionica (Buchanan and Pine 1962) Pine and Georg 1969 (Approved Lists 1980)

Type strain
- ATCC 14157; CCUG 4939; CIP 101941; DSM 43307; IFO 14587; JCM 5830; NBRC 14587; NCTC 12967; VKM Ac-1449

Synonyms
- "Actinomyces propionicus" Buchanan and Pine 1962; Propionibacterium propionicum corrig. (Buchanan and Pine 1962) Charfreitag et al. 1988; Propionibacterium propionicus (Buchanan and Pine 1962) Charfreitag et al. 1988; Pseudopropionibacterium propionicum (Buchanan and Pine 1962) Scholz and Kilian 2016

Species of bacterium

Arachnia propionica is a Gram positive, aerotolerant anaerobic species of Arachnia, found as part of the normal human oral flora.
