= Propionimicrobium lymphophilum =

Scientific classification
- Domain: Bacteria
- Kingdom: Bacillati
- Phylum: Actinomycetota
- Class: Actinomycetia
- Order: Propionibacteriales
- Family: Propionibacteriaceae
- Genus: Propionimicrobium; Stackebrandt et al. 2002
- Species: P. lymphophilum

Binomial name
- Propionimicrobium lymphophilum (Torrey 1916) Stackebrandt et al. 2002

Type strain
- ATCC 27520; CCUG 27816; CIP 103263; DSM 4903; JCM 5829; LMG 16728; NCDO 2587; NCGB 2587; NCIMB 702587; NCTC 11866; VPI 7265 B

Synonyms
- "Bacillus lymphophilus" Torrey 1916; Corynebacterium lymphophilum (Torrey 1916) Eberson 1918; Mycobacterium lymphophilum (Torrey 1916) Krasil'nikov 1949; Propionibacterium lymphophilum (Torrey 1916) Johnson and Cummins 1972 (Approved Lists 1980)

Species of bacterium

Propionimicrobium lymphophilum is a Gram-positive bacterium which has been isolated from submaxillary tissue.
