= Acidipropionibacterium =

Scientific classification
- Domain: Bacteria
- Kingdom: Bacillati
- Phylum: Actinomycetota
- Class: Actinomycetes
- Order: Propionibacteriales
- Family: Propionibacteriaceae
- Genus: Acidipropionibacterium; Scholz and Kilian 2016

Type species
- Acidipropionibacterium jensenii (van Niel 1928) Scholz and Kilian 2016

Species
- A. acidipropionici; A. damnosum; A. jensenii; A. microaerophilum; A. olivae; A. thoenii; "A. timonense"; A. virtanenii

Genus of bacteria

Acidipropionibacterium is a bacterial genus from the family Propionibacteriaceae.

== Phylogeny ==
The currently accepted taxonomy is based on the List of Prokaryotic names with Standing in Nomenclature (LPSN) and National Center for Biotechnology Information (NCBI).

16S rRNA based LTP_10_2024

- Acidipropionibacterium
  - - A. jensenii (van Niel 1928) Scholz and Kilian 2016
    - A. thoenii (van Niel 1928) Scholz and Kilian 2016
  - - A. virtanenii Deptula et al. 2018
    - - A. acidipropionici (Orla-Jensen 1909) Scholz and Kilian 2016
      - - A. microaerophilum (Koussémon et al. 2001) Scholz and Kilian 2016
        - - A. damnosum (Lucena-Padrós et al. 2014) Scholz and Kilian 2016
          - A. olivae (Lucena-Padrós et al. 2014) Scholz and Kilian 2016

120 marker proteins based GTDB 10-RS226

- Acidipropionibacterium
  - - A. jensenii
    - A. thoenii
  - - A. acidipropionici
    - A. virtanenii

== See also ==
- List of bacterial orders
- List of bacteria genera
