= Cutibacterium granulosum =

Scientific classification
- Domain: Bacteria
- Kingdom: Bacillati
- Phylum: Actinomycetota
- Class: Actinomycetes
- Order: Propionibacteriales
- Family: Propionibacteriaceae
- Genus: Cutibacterium
- Species: C. granulosum

Binomial name
- Cutibacterium granulosum (Prévot 1938) Scholz and Kilian 2016

Type strain
- ATCC 25564; CCUG 32987; CIP 103262; DSM 20700; LMG 16726; NCTC 11865

Synonyms
- "Corynebacterium granulosum" Prévot 1938; Propionibacterium granulosum (Prévot 1938) Moore and Holdeman 1970 (Approved Lists 1980)

Species of bacterium

Cutibacterium granulosum (Propionibacterium granulosum) is an anaerobic, rod-shaped, gram-positive bacteria, that is part of the normal skin microbiome.

C. granulosum may be involved in the increased antibiotic-resistance of Cutibacterium acnes, through horizontal transfer of drug-resistant plasmids.

C. granulosum co-localises with C.acnes in the stratum corneum and hair follicles, and is found at lower abundances.

== Genome composition ==
The C. granulosum genome has been relatively understudied. One study compiled a total of 30 C. granulosum genomes from patients, and found that its genome typically varies from 2.050 to 2.256 million bases, and has a G+C content of around 64.14%.

526 genes were found to be shared across all 30 genomes analysed, with around 72 genes coding for virulence-related factors.

C. granulosum is typically highly resistant to antimicrobial agents, and can carry a plasmid (known as pTZC1) that results in multi-drug resistance. This plasmid can encode for resistance to macrolides and clindamycin, which are antibiotics typically used to treat chronic inflammatory skin diseases that are made worse by C. acnes.

== Role in Diseases ==
=== Roles in Cancer ===
C. granulosum's role within different cancers is still not well defined, with some studies showing decreased incidence of the development of cancer related to its relative abundance levels subcutaneously, and others showing an increased abundance is found in cancer tissues compared to normal tissues.

==== Pancreatic Cancer ====
A study of 105 patients with pancreatic ductal adenocarcinoma (PDAC), found that C. granulosum, C. acnes, and Staphylococcus aureus were found at a higher abundance within cancerous tissues, compared to normal patient tissue.

==== Melanoma (skin cancer) ====
C. granulosum has been found to be associated with a better overall survival and lower recurrence of cutaneous melanoma.

=== Acne vulgaris (acne) ===
Similar to C. acnes, C. granulosum has been found to be more abundant within adolescents suffering from severe acne compared to controls, although its pathology is not well known. The abundance of Cutibacterium species within adolescents suffering from acne appears to affect girls, people with darker skin, people with more-advanced puberty, and people who are overweight, more.

== Interactions with C. acnes ==
C. acnes forms biofilms that are found more frequently within people who have acne, and are thought to exacerbate it. A primary study has found that C. granulosum may be able to degrade the biofilm formed by C. acnes, through secretion of the protein, BmdE, as a form of interspecies competition, as both species tend to colonise the pilosebaceous units (PSUs).
