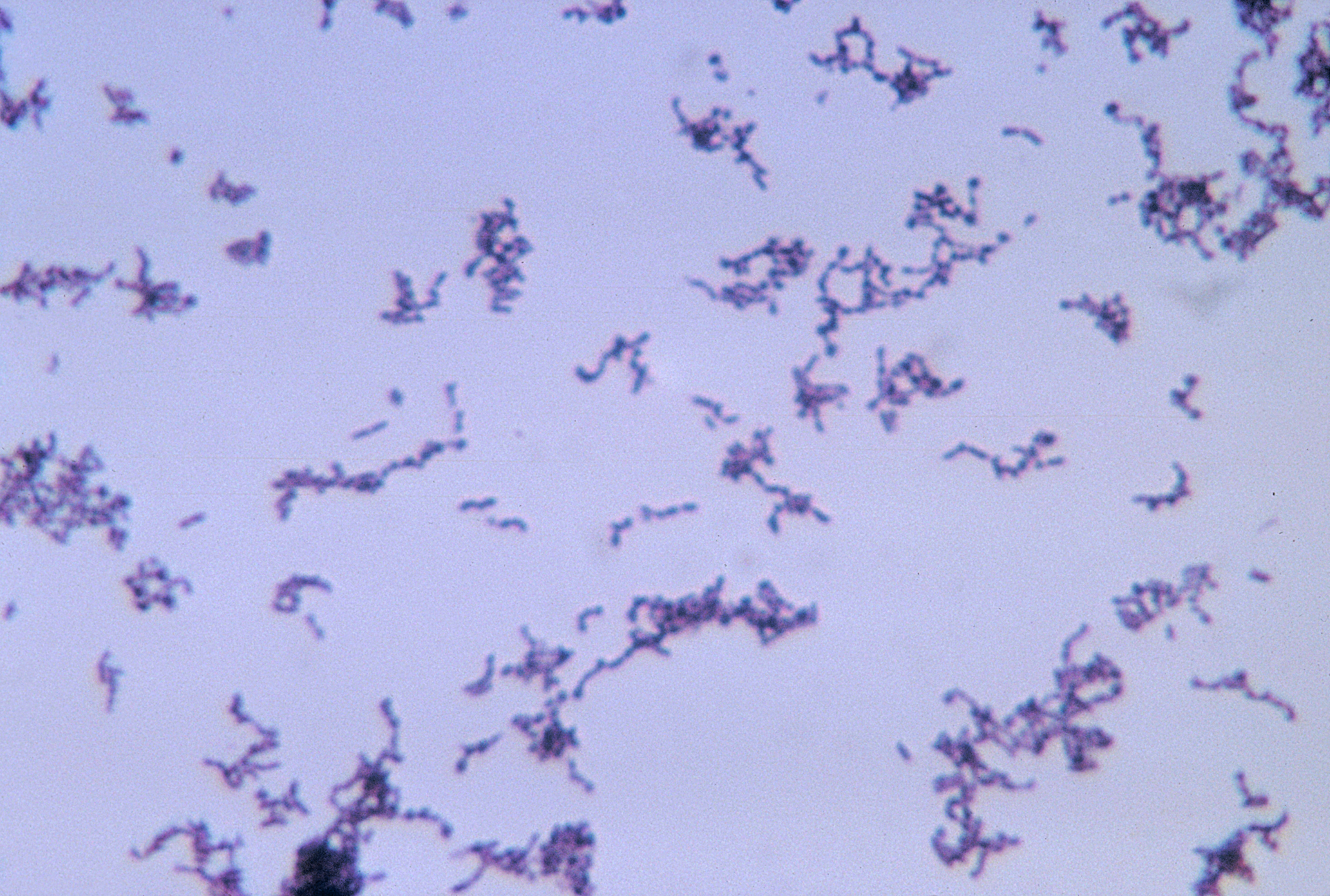

Scientific classification
- Domain: Bacteria
- Kingdom: Bacillati
- Phylum: Actinomycetota
- Class: Actinomycetes
- Order: Propionibacteriales
- Family: Propionibacteriaceae; Delwiche 1957 (Approved Lists 1980)

Genera
- See text

= Propionibacteriaceae =

Family of bacteria

The Propionibacteriaceae are a family of Gram-positive bacteria found in dairy products or in the intestinal tracts of animals and living in the pores of humans.

== Phylogeny ==
The currently accepted taxonomy is based on the List of Prokaryotic names with Standing in Nomenclature (LPSN) and National Center for Biotechnology Information (NCBI).

16S rRNA based LTP_10_2024

- Propionibacteriaceae
  - - Microlunatus panaciterrae
    - - Microlunatus
      - Friedmanniella
  - - - Naumannella
      - - Parenemella
        - Enemella
    - - - Micropruina
        - - Propionicicella
          - Propionicimonas
      - - - Auraticoccus
          - - Mariniluteicoccus Zhang et al. 2014
            - - Desertihabitans
              - - Granulicoccus
                - - Propioniferax
                  - Raineyella
        - - Propioniciclava [incl. Brevilactibacter]
          - - Luteococcus
            - - Aestuariimicrobium
              - - Tessaracoccus
                - - Brooklawnia
                  - - - Arachnia rubra
                      - Tessaracoccus~
                    - - - - Propionimicrobium
                          - Vaginimicrobium
                        - Propionibacterium
                      - - - Cutibacterium granulosum
                          - Acidipropionibacterium
                        - - - Cutibacterium avidum
                            - - Cutibacterium equinum
                              - Arachnia
                          - Cutibacterium

120 marker proteins based GTDB 10-RS226

- - Raineyella Pikuta et al. 2016
  - - - - Parenemella Bernard et al. 2020
        - - - Granulicoccus Maszenan et al. 2007
            - Propioniferax Yokota et al. 1994
          - Enemella Bernard et al. 2020
      - - - Naumannella Rieser et al. 2012
          - - Auraticoccus Alonso-Vega et al. 2011
            - Desertihabitans Sun et al. 2019
        - - "Ca. Avipropionibacterium" Gilroy et al. 2021
          - - Microlunatus_A
            - - Microlunatus_B
              - - Microlunatus Nakamura et al. 1995
                - - Microlunatus panaciterrae
                  - Friedmanniella Schumann et al. 1997
    - - - Propionicicella Bae et al. 2006
        - - Propionicimonas Akasaka et al. 2003
          - - Micropruina Shintani et al. 2000
            - Propioniciclava Sugawara et al. 2011 [Brevilactibacter
              Wenning et al. 2020; "Nigerium" Traore et al. 2016]
      - - Arachnia Pine and Georg 1969 [incl. Pseudopropionibacterium
          Scholz & Kilian 2016; Tessaracoccus Maszenan et al. 1999]
        - - - Aestuariimicrobium Jung et al. 2007
            - Luteococcus Tamura et al. 1994
          - - - - - Propionimicrobium Stackebrandt et al. 2002
                  - Vaginimicrobium Diop et al. 2020
                - Brooklawnia Rainey et al. 2006
              - Propionibacterium Orla-Jensen 1909
            - - Acidipropionibacterium Scholz and Kilian 2016
              - Cutibacterium Scholz and Kilian 2016

Genera incertae sedis:

- Ammonicoccus Yu et al. 2025
- "Nigeribacterium" Khare et al. 2021
- "Pseudenemella" Ren et al. 2026

== See also ==
- List of bacterial orders
- List of bacteria genera
