= Nocardioides sediminis =

Scientific classification
- Domain: Bacteria
- Kingdom: Bacillati
- Phylum: Actinomycetota
- Class: Actinomycetia
- Order: Propionibacteriales
- Family: Nocardioidaceae
- Genus: Nocardioides
- Species: N. sediminis

Binomial name
- Nocardioides sediminis Dastager et al. 2009

Type strain
- DSM 19263; KCTC 19271; MSL 01

Species of bacterium

Nocardioides sediminis is a Gram-positive, aerobic and short-rod-shaped bacterium from the genus Nocardioides which has been isolated from sediments from Bigeum Island, Korea.
