= Nocardioides koreensis =

Scientific classification
- Domain: Bacteria
- Kingdom: Bacillati
- Phylum: Actinomycetota
- Class: Actinomycetia
- Order: Propionibacteriales
- Family: Nocardioidaceae
- Genus: Nocardioides
- Species: N. koreensis

Binomial name
- Nocardioides koreensis Dastager et al. 2008

Type strain
- DSM 19266; JCM 16022; KCTC 19272; MSL-09

Species of bacterium

Nocardioides koreensis is a Gram-positive bacterium from the genus Nocardioides which has been isolated from farming field soil on Bigeum Island, Korea.
