= Nocardioides bigeumensis =

Scientific classification
- Domain: Bacteria
- Kingdom: Bacillati
- Phylum: Actinomycetota
- Class: Actinomycetes
- Order: Propionibacteriales
- Family: Nocardioidaceae
- Genus: Nocardioides
- Species: N. bigeumensis

Binomial name
- Nocardioides bigeumensis Dastager et al. 2008

Type strain
- DSM 19320; JCM 16021; KCTC 19290; MSL-19

Species of bacterium

Nocardioides bigeumensis is a gram-positive bacterium from the genus Nocardioides that has been isolated from farming field soil on Bigeum Island, South Korea.
