= Nocardioides agariphilus =

Scientific classification
- Domain: Bacteria
- Kingdom: Bacillati
- Phylum: Actinomycetota
- Class: Actinomycetia
- Order: Propionibacteriales
- Family: Nocardioidaceae
- Genus: Nocardioides
- Species: N. agariphilus

Binomial name
- Nocardioides agariphilus Dastager et al. 2008

Type strain
- DSM 19323; JCM 16020; KCTC 19276; MSL-28

Species of bacterium

Nocardioides agariphilus is a Gram-positive bacterium from the genus Nocardioides which has been isolated from farming field soil on the Bigeum Island, Korea.
