= Nocardioides mesophilus =

Scientific classification
- Domain: Bacteria
- Kingdom: Bacillati
- Phylum: Actinomycetota
- Class: Actinomycetia
- Order: Propionibacteriales
- Family: Nocardioidaceae
- Genus: Nocardioides
- Species: N. mesophilus

Binomial name
- Nocardioides mesophilus Dastager et al. 2010

Type strain
- DSM 19432; KCTC 19310; MSL 22

Species of bacterium

Nocardioides mesophilus is a mesophilic, rod-shaped, and motile bacterium from the genus Nocardioides which has been isolated from soil from Bigeum Island, Korea.
