= Nocardioides dilutus =

Scientific classification
- Domain: Bacteria
- Kingdom: Bacillati
- Phylum: Actinomycetota
- Class: Actinomycetia
- Order: Propionibacteriales
- Family: Nocardioidaceae
- Genus: Nocardioides
- Species: N. dilutus

Binomial name
- Nocardioides dilutus corrig. Dastager et al. 2009

Type strain
- DSM 19318; KCTC 19288; MSL-11

Synonyms
- Nocardioides dilutes Dastager et al. 2009

Species of bacterium

Nocardioides dilutus is a bacterium from the genus Nocardioides which has been isolated from a farming field on Bigeum Island, South Korea.
