= Nocardioides tritolerans =

Scientific classification
- Domain: Bacteria
- Kingdom: Bacillati
- Phylum: Actinomycetota
- Class: Actinomycetia
- Order: Propionibacteriales
- Family: Nocardioidaceae
- Genus: Nocardioides
- Species: N. tritolerans

Binomial name
- Nocardioides tritolerans Dastager et al. 2009

Type strain
- DSM 19319; KCTC 19289; MSL-14

Species of bacterium

Nocardioides tritolerans is a Gram-positive and strictly aerobic bacterium from the genus Nocardioides which has been isolated from farming field soil on Bigeum Island, Korea.
