= Nocardioides islandensis =

Scientific classification
- Domain: Bacteria
- Kingdom: Bacillati
- Phylum: Actinomycetota
- Class: Actinomycetia
- Order: Propionibacteriales
- Family: Nocardioidaceae
- Genus: Nocardioides
- Species: N. islandensis

Binomial name
- Nocardioides islandensis corrig. Dastager et al. 2009

Type strain
- DSM 19321; KCTC 19275; MSL-26

Synonyms
- Nocardioides islandiensis Dastager et al. 2009

Species of bacterium

Nocardioides islandensis is a bacterium from the genus Nocardioides which has been isolated from farming field soil from Bigeum Island, Korea.
