= Marmoricola bigeumensis =

Scientific classification
- Domain: Bacteria
- Kingdom: Bacillati
- Phylum: Actinomycetota
- Class: Actinomycetia
- Order: Propionibacteriales
- Family: Nocardioidaceae
- Genus: Marmoricola
- Species: M. bigeumensis

Binomial name
- Marmoricola bigeumensis Dastager et al. 2008

Type strain
- DSM 19426; JCM 15624; KCTC 19287; MSL-05

Species of bacterium

Marmoricola bigeumensis is a Gram-positive and aerobic bacterium from the genus Marmoricola which has been isolated from soil from a farming field on the Bigeum Island, Korea.
