= Nocardioides caricicola =

Scientific classification
- Domain: Bacteria
- Kingdom: Bacillati
- Phylum: Actinomycetota
- Class: Actinomycetia
- Order: Propionibacteriales
- Family: Nocardioidaceae
- Genus: Nocardioides
- Species: N. caricicola

Binomial name
- Nocardioides caricicola Song et al. 2011

Type strain
- DSM 22177; JCM 17686; KACC 13778; YC6903

Species of bacterium

Nocardioides caricicola is a gram-positive and coccoid to rod-shaped bacterium from the genus Nocardioides that has been isolated from a root of the plant Carex scabrifolia on Namhae Island, South Korea.
