= Nocardioides halotolerans =

Scientific classification
- Domain: Bacteria
- Kingdom: Bacillati
- Phylum: Actinomycetota
- Class: Actinomycetia
- Order: Propionibacteriales
- Family: Nocardioidaceae
- Genus: Nocardioides
- Species: N. halotolerans

Binomial name
- Nocardioides halotolerans Dastager et al. 2009

Type strain
- DSM 19273; KCTC 19274; MSL-23

Species of bacterium

Nocardioides halotolerans is a Gram-positive, strictly aerobic, halotolerant and motile bacterium from the genus Nocardioides which has been isolated from farming field soil on Bigeum Island, Korea.
