= Nocardioides terrae =

Scientific classification
- Domain: Bacteria
- Kingdom: Bacillati
- Phylum: Actinomycetota
- Class: Actinomycetia
- Order: Propionibacteriales
- Family: Nocardioidaceae
- Genus: Nocardioides
- Species: N. terrae

Binomial name
- Nocardioides terrae Zhang et al. 2009

Type strain
- CGMCC 1.7056; JCM 16799; NBRC 104259; VA15

Species of bacterium

Nocardioides terrae is a Gram-positive, strictly aerobic and non-motile bacterium from the genus Nocardioides which has been isolated from forest soil from Changbai Mountain in China. Nocardioides terrae produces the menaquinone MK-8(H4).
