= Marmoricola aequoreus =

Scientific classification
- Domain: Bacteria
- Kingdom: Bacillati
- Phylum: Actinomycetota
- Class: Actinomycetes
- Order: Propionibacteriales
- Family: Nocardioidaceae
- Genus: Marmoricola
- Species: M. aequoreus

Binomial name
- Marmoricola aequoreus Lee 2007

Type strain
- CIP 109645; JCM 13812; RRL B-24464; SST-45

Species of bacterium

Marmoricola aequoreus is a Gram-positive, aerobic, non-spore-forming and non-motile bacterium from the genus Marmoricola which has been isolated from sediments from Samyang Beach, Korea.
