= Nocardioides psychrotolerans =

Scientific classification
- Domain: Bacteria
- Kingdom: Bacillati
- Phylum: Actinomycetota
- Class: Actinomycetia
- Order: Propionibacteriales
- Family: Nocardioidaceae
- Genus: Nocardioides
- Species: N. psychrotolerans

Binomial name
- Nocardioides psychrotolerans Liu et al. 2013

Type strain
- CGMCC 1.11156; NBRC 108563; CGMCC 1.11156; RHLT2-1

Species of bacterium

Nocardioides psychrotolerans is a Gram-positive, non-spore-forming and rod-shaped bacterium from the genus Nocardioides which has been isolated from soil from the Hailuogou glacier in Sichuan Province, China.
