= Nocardioides daecheongensis =

Scientific classification
- Domain: Bacteria
- Kingdom: Bacillati
- Phylum: Actinomycetota
- Class: Actinomycetia
- Order: Propionibacteriales
- Family: Nocardioidaceae
- Genus: Nocardioides
- Species: N. daecheongensis

Binomial name
- Nocardioides daecheongensis Lim et al. 2014

Type strain
- DSM 27136; KACC 17297; NBRC 109597; KIS2-16

Species of bacterium

Nocardioides daecheongensis is a gram-positive, aerobic, non-spore-forming and non-motile bacterium from the genus Nocardioides that has been isolated from forest soil from Incheon on Daecheong Island, South Korea.
