= Mumia flava =

Scientific classification
- Domain: Bacteria
- Kingdom: Bacillati
- Phylum: Actinomycetota
- Class: Actinomycetia
- Order: Propionibacteriales
- Family: Nocardioidaceae
- Genus: Mumia
- Species: M. flava

Binomial name
- Mumia flava Lee et al. 2014

Type strain
- DSM 27763; MCCC 1A00646; MUSC 201; NBRC 109973

Species of bacterium

Mumia flava is a bacterium from the genus Mumia which has been isolated from mangrove soil in Kuantan, Malaysia.
