= Nocardioides maradonensis =

Scientific classification
- Domain: Bacteria
- Kingdom: Bacillati
- Phylum: Actinomycetota
- Class: Actinomycetia
- Order: Propionibacteriales
- Family: Nocardioidaceae
- Genus: Nocardioides
- Species: N. maradonensis

Binomial name
- Nocardioides maradonensis Lee et al. 2011

Type strain
- DSM 19769; KCTC 19384; RP-B30

Species of bacterium

Nocardioides maradonensis is a Gram-positive and rod-shaped bacterium from the genus Nocardioides which has been isolated from rhizosphere soil around the plant Peucedanum japonicum in Jeju, Korea.
