= Nocardioides terrigena =

Scientific classification
- Domain: Bacteria
- Kingdom: Bacillati
- Phylum: Actinomycetota
- Class: Actinomycetia
- Order: Propionibacteriales
- Family: Nocardioidaceae
- Genus: Nocardioides
- Species: N. terrigena

Binomial name
- Nocardioides terrigena Yoon et al. 2007

Type strain
- DS-17; JCM 14582; KCTC 19217

Species of bacterium

Nocardioides terrigena is a Gram-positive bacterium from the genus Nocardioides which has been isolated from soil from Dokdo, Korea.
