= Aeromicrobium panaciterrae =

Scientific classification
- Domain: Bacteria
- Kingdom: Bacillati
- Phylum: Actinomycetota
- Class: Actinomycetia
- Order: Propionibacteriales
- Family: Nocardioidaceae
- Genus: Aeromicrobium
- Species: A. panaciterrae

Binomial name
- Aeromicrobium panaciterrae Cui et al. 2007

Type strain
- CCUG 52476; DSM 17939; Gsoil 161; JCM 16926; KCTC 19131

Species of bacterium

Aeromicrobium panaciterrae is a Gram-positive, strictly aerobic, rod-shaped, and non-spore-forming bacterium from the genus Aeromicrobium which has been isolated from soil from a ginseng field in Pocheon, Korea.
