= Nocardioides gilvus =

Scientific classification
- Domain: Bacteria
- Kingdom: Bacillati
- Phylum: Actinomycetota
- Class: Actinomycetia
- Order: Propionibacteriales
- Family: Nocardioidaceae
- Genus: Nocardioides
- Species: N. gilvus

Binomial name
- Nocardioides gilvus Zhang et al. 2017

Type strain
- KCTC 39561; MCCC 1H00114; XZ17

Species of bacterium

Nocardioides gilvus is a Gram-positive, facultatively anaerobic and non-motile bacterium from the genus Nocardioides which has been isolated from the Namtso Lake, Tibet.
