= Nocardioides ginsengagri =

Scientific classification
- Domain: Bacteria
- Kingdom: Bacillati
- Phylum: Actinomycetota
- Class: Actinomycetia
- Order: Propionibacteriales
- Family: Nocardioidaceae
- Genus: Nocardioides
- Species: N. ginsengagri

Binomial name
- Nocardioides ginsengagri Lee et al. 2012

Type strain
- BX5-10; DSM 21362; Gsoil BX5-10; KCTC 19467

Species of bacterium

Nocardioides ginsengagri is a Gram-positive, rod-shaped, non-spore-forming and non-motile bacterium from the genus Nocardioides which has been isolated from soil from a ginseng field in Baekdu Mountain, China.
