= Nocardioides antarcticus =

Scientific classification
- Domain: Bacteria
- Kingdom: Bacillati
- Phylum: Actinomycetota
- Class: Actinomycetes
- Order: Propionibacteriales
- Family: Nocardioidaceae
- Genus: Nocardioides
- Species: N. antarcticus

Binomial name
- Nocardioides antarcticus Deng et al. 2015

Type strain
- CCTCC AB2014053; LMG 28254; M-SA3-94

Species of bacterium

Nocardioides antarcticus is a gram-positive, aerobic, rod-shaped and non-motile bacterium from the genus Nocardioides that has been isolated from marine sediments from Ardley Cove near King George Island in Antarctica.
