= Marmoricola scoriae =

Scientific classification
- Domain: Bacteria
- Kingdom: Bacillati
- Phylum: Actinomycetota
- Class: Actinomycetia
- Order: Propionibacteriales
- Family: Nocardioidaceae
- Genus: Marmoricola
- Species: M. scoriae

Binomial name
- Marmoricola scoriae Lee and Lee 2010

Type strain
- DSM 22127; JCM 17444; KCTC 19597; Sco-D01

Species of bacterium

Marmoricola scoriaes is a Gram-positive bacterium from the genus Marmoricola which has been isolated from volcanic ash from Jeju Island, Korea.
