= Nocardioides daejeonensis =

Scientific classification
- Domain: Bacteria
- Kingdom: Bacillati
- Phylum: Actinomycetota
- Class: Actinomycetia
- Order: Propionibacteriales
- Family: Nocardioidaceae
- Genus: Nocardioides
- Species: N. daejeonensis

Binomial name
- Nocardioides daejeonensis Woo et al. 2012

Type strain
- JCM 16922; KCTC 19772; MJ31

Species of bacterium

Nocardioides daejeonensis is a gram-positive, denitrifying, rod-shaped, aerobic and non-motile bacterium from the genus Nocardioides that has been isolated from a sewage disposal plant in Daejeon, South Korea.
