= Nocardioides rubriscoriae =

Scientific classification
- Domain: Bacteria
- Kingdom: Bacillati
- Phylum: Actinomycetota
- Class: Actinomycetia
- Order: Propionibacteriales
- Family: Nocardioidaceae
- Genus: Nocardioides
- Species: N. rubriscoriae

Binomial name
- Nocardioides rubriscoriae corrig. Lee and Lee 2014

Type strain
- DSM 23986; KCTC 19805; NBRC 107916; Sco-A25

Synonyms
- Nocardioides rubroscoriae Lee and Lee 2014

Species of bacterium

Nocardioides rubriscoriae is a rod-shaped bacterium from the genus Nocardioides which has been isolated from volcanic ash from a parasitic volcano in Jeju, Korea.
