= Nocardioides rotundus =

Scientific classification
- Domain: Bacteria
- Kingdom: Bacillati
- Phylum: Actinomycetota
- Class: Actinomycetia
- Order: Propionibacteriales
- Family: Nocardioidaceae
- Genus: Nocardioides
- Species: N. rotundus

Binomial name
- Nocardioides rotundus Wang and Zhang et al. 2016

Type strain
- KCTC 39638; MCCC 1A10561; GY0594

Species of bacterium

Nocardioides rotundus is a Gram-positive and aerobic bacterium in the genus Nocardioides which has been isolated from deep seawater from the western Pacific.
