= Aeromicrobium camelliae =

Scientific classification
- Domain: Bacteria
- Kingdom: Bacillati
- Phylum: Actinomycetota
- Class: Actinomycetia
- Order: Propionibacteriales
- Family: Nocardioidaceae
- Genus: Aeromicrobium
- Species: A. camelliae

Binomial name
- Aeromicrobium camelliae Niu et al. 2015

Type strain
- YS17; CGMCC 1.12942; JCM 30952

Species of bacterium

Aeromicrobium camelliae is a Gram-positive, aerobic and non-spore-forming bacterium from the genus Aeromicrobium which has been isolated from Pu'er tea in Yunnan in China.
