= Nocardioides humi =

Scientific classification
- Domain: Bacteria
- Kingdom: Bacillati
- Phylum: Actinomycetota
- Class: Actinomycetia
- Order: Propionibacteriales
- Family: Nocardioidaceae
- Genus: Nocardioides
- Species: N. humi

Binomial name
- Nocardioides humi Kim et al. 2009

Type strain
- DCY24; JCM 14942; JCM 17026; KCTC 19265; LMG 24128; Yang DCY24

Species of bacterium

Nocardioides humi is a Gram-positive, aerobic, rod-shaped and motile bacterium from the genus Nocardioides which has been isolated from soil from a ginseng field in Korea. Nocardioides humi produces beta-glucosidase.
