= Nocardioides deserti =

Scientific classification
- Domain: Bacteria
- Kingdom: Bacillati
- Phylum: Actinomycetota
- Class: Actinomycetia
- Order: Propionibacteriales
- Family: Nocardioidaceae
- Genus: Nocardioides
- Species: N. deserti

Binomial name
- Nocardioides deserti Tuo et al. 2015

Type strain
- CGMCC 4.7183; DSM 26045; SC8A-24

Species of bacterium

Nocardioides deserti is a Gram-positive and aerobic bacterium from the genus Nocardioides which has been isolated from rhizosphere soil from the plant Alhagi sparsifolia in the Taklimakan desert in Xinjiang, China.
