= Nocardioides intraradicalis =

Scientific classification
- Domain: Bacteria
- Kingdom: Bacillati
- Phylum: Actinomycetota
- Class: Actinomycetia
- Order: Propionibacteriales
- Family: Nocardioidaceae
- Genus: Nocardioides
- Species: N. intraradicalis

Binomial name
- Nocardioides intraradicalis Huang et al. 2016

Type strain
- CGMCC 4.7251; JCM 30632; YIM DR1091

Species of bacterium

Nocardioides intraradicalis is a Gram-positive, non-spore-forming and non-motile bacterium from the genus Nocardioides which has been isolated from the roots of the plant Psammosilene tunicoides from Gejiu, China.
