= Nocardioides daphniae =

Scientific classification
- Domain: Bacteria
- Kingdom: Bacillati
- Phylum: Actinomycetota
- Class: Actinomycetia
- Order: Propionibacteriales
- Family: Nocardioidaceae
- Genus: Nocardioides
- Species: N. daphniae

Binomial name
- Nocardioides daphniae Tóth et al. 2008

Type strain
- CCM 7403; D287; DSM 18664; JCM 16608

Species of bacterium

Nocardioides daphniae is a gram-positive bacterium from the genus Nocardioides that has been isolated from the water flea Daphnia cucullata from Lake Balaton in Hungary.
