= Nocardioides litorisoli =

Scientific classification
- Domain: Bacteria
- Kingdom: Bacillati
- Phylum: Actinomycetota
- Class: Actinomycetia
- Order: Propionibacteriales
- Family: Nocardioidaceae
- Genus: Nocardioides
- Species: N. litorisoli

Binomial name
- Nocardioides litorisoli Wang et al. 2017

Type strain
- CCTCCAB 2016255; KCTC 39845 x-2

Species of bacterium

Nocardioides litorisoli is a Gram-positive, rod-shaped and non-spore-forming bacterium from the genus Nocardioides which has been isolated from soil near Sayram Lake in China.
