= Nocardioides panzhihuensis =

Scientific classification
- Domain: Bacteria
- Kingdom: Bacillati
- Phylum: Actinomycetota
- Class: Actinomycetia
- Order: Propionibacteriales
- Family: Nocardioidaceae
- Genus: Nocardioides
- Species: N. panzhihuensis

Binomial name
- Nocardioides panzhihuensis corrig. Qin et al. 2012

Type strain
- KCTC 19888; NBRC 108680; KLBMP 1050

Synonyms
- Nocardioides panzhihuaensis Qin et al. 2012

Species of bacterium

Nocardioides panzhihuensis is a Gram-positive, aerobic and rod-shaped bacterium from the genus Nocardioides which has been isolated from the plant Jatropha curcas in the Sichuan Province, China.
