= Nocardioides solisilvae =

Scientific classification
- Domain: Bacteria
- Kingdom: Bacillati
- Phylum: Actinomycetota
- Class: Actinomycetia
- Order: Propionibacteriales
- Family: Nocardioidaceae
- Genus: Nocardioides
- Species: N. solisilvae

Binomial name
- Nocardioides solisilvae Sultanpuram et al. 2015

Type strain
- KCTC 39528; MCC 2762; Ka25

Species of bacterium

Nocardioides solisilvae is a Gram-positive, aerobic and rod-shaped bacterium from the genus Nocardioides which has been isolated from forest soil in Himachal Pradesh, India.
