= Nocardioides oleivorans =

Scientific classification
- Domain: Bacteria
- Kingdom: Bacillati
- Phylum: Actinomycetota
- Class: Actinomycetia
- Order: Propionibacteriales
- Family: Nocardioidaceae
- Genus: Nocardioides
- Species: N. oleivorans

Binomial name
- Nocardioides oleivorans Schippers et al. 2005

Type strain
- BAS3; CIP 108901; DSM 16090; IAM 15341; JCM 14342; NCIMB 14004

Species of bacterium

Nocardioides oleivorans is a chitinolytic and aerobic bacterium from the genus Nocardioides which has been isolated from an oil sample in Gifhorn, Germany. Nocardioides oleivorans has the ability to degrade crude oil.
