= Marmoricola terrae =

Scientific classification
- Domain: Bacteria
- Kingdom: Bacillati
- Phylum: Actinomycetota
- Class: Actinomycetia
- Order: Propionibacteriales
- Family: Nocardioidaceae
- Genus: Marmoricola
- Species: M. terrae

Binomial name
- Marmoricola terrae Kim et al. 2015

Type strain
- DSM 27141; KACC 17308; JOS5-1; NBRC 109602

Species of bacterium

Marmoricola terrae is a bacterium from the genus Marmoricola which has been isolated from soil from Jeju Island, Korea.
