= Nocardioides aestuarii =

Scientific classification
- Domain: Bacteria
- Kingdom: Bacillati
- Phylum: Actinomycetota
- Class: Actinomycetia
- Order: Propionibacteriales
- Family: Nocardioidaceae
- Genus: Nocardioides
- Species: N. aquaticus

Binomial name
- Nocardioides aquaticus Yi and Chun 2004

Type strain
- IMSNU 14029; JCM 12125; KCTC 9921; JC2056

Species of bacterium

Nocardioides aquaticus is a strictly aerobic, rod-shaped and non-motile bacterium from the genus Nocardioides which has been isolated from tidal flat sediments in Korea.
