= Aeromicrobium ponti =

Scientific classification
- Domain: Bacteria
- Kingdom: Bacillati
- Phylum: Actinomycetota
- Class: Actinomycetia
- Order: Propionibacteriales
- Family: Nocardioidaceae
- Genus: Aeromicrobium
- Species: A. ponti

Binomial name
- Aeromicrobium ponti Lee and Lee 2008

Type strain
- DSM 19178; HSW-1; JCM 16375; KACC 20565

Species of bacterium

Aeromicrobium ponti is a Gram-positive, aerobic and non-motile bacterium from the genus Aeromicrobium which has been isolated from sea water from the Hwasun Beach in Korea.
