= Nocardioides daedukensis =

Scientific classification
- Domain: Bacteria
- Kingdom: Bacillati
- Phylum: Actinomycetota
- Class: Actinomycetia
- Order: Propionibacteriales
- Family: Nocardioidaceae
- Genus: Nocardioides
- Species: N. daedukensis

Binomial name
- Nocardioides daedukensis Yoon et al. 2010

Type strain
- CCUG 57505; KCTC 19601; MDN22

Species of bacterium

Nocardioides daedukensis is a gram-positive and non-motile bacterium from the genus Nocardioides that has been isolated from soil around a wastewater treatment plant in Taejon, South Korea.
