= Nocardioides hungaricus =

Scientific classification
- Domain: Bacteria
- Kingdom: Bacillati
- Phylum: Actinomycetota
- Class: Actinomycetia
- Order: Propionibacteriales
- Family: Nocardioidaceae
- Genus: Nocardioides
- Species: N. hungaricus

Binomial name
- Nocardioides hungaricus Tóth et al. 2011

Type strain
- 1RaM5-12; DSM 21673; NCAIM 2330; RaM5-12

Species of bacterium

Nocardioides hungaricus is a Gram-positive and rod-shaped bacterium from the genus Nocardioides which has been isolated from a drinking water supply system in Budapest, Hungary.
