= Nocardioides salsibiostraticola =

Scientific classification
- Domain: Bacteria
- Kingdom: Bacillati
- Phylum: Actinomycetota
- Class: Actinomycetia
- Order: Propionibacteriales
- Family: Nocardioidaceae
- Genus: Nocardioides
- Species: N. salsibiostraticola

Binomial name
- Nocardioides salsibiostraticola Cho et al. 2013

Type strain
- JCM 18743; KCTC 29158; PAMC 26527

Species of bacterium

Nocardioides salsibiostraticola is a Gram-positive, aerobic, non-spore-forming and non-motile bacterium from the genus Nocardioides which has been isolated from biofilm from coastal seawater from the Norwegian Sea.
