= Nocardioides albidus =

Scientific classification
- Domain: Bacteria
- Kingdom: Bacillati
- Phylum: Actinomycetota
- Class: Actinomycetia
- Order: Propionibacteriales
- Family: Nocardioidaceae
- Genus: Nocardioides
- Species: N. albidus

Binomial name
- Nocardioides albidus Singh et al. 2016

Type strain
- CCTCC AB 2015297; KCTC 39607; THG-S11.7

Species of bacterium

Nocardioides albidus is a Gram-positive, aerobic and non-motile bacterium from the genus Nocardioides which has been isolated from soil from Incheon, Korea.
