= Marmoricola pocheonensis =

Scientific classification
- Domain: Bacteria
- Kingdom: Bacillati
- Phylum: Actinomycetota
- Class: Actinomycetia
- Order: Propionibacteriales
- Family: Nocardioidaceae
- Genus: Marmoricola
- Species: M. pocheonensis

Binomial name
- Marmoricola pocheonensis Lee et al. 2016

Type strain
- DSM 22773; Gsoil 818; KACC 14275

Species of bacterium

Marmoricola pocheonensis is a Gram-positive, aerobic, non-spore-forming and rod-shaped bacterium from the genus Marmoricola which has been isolated from soil from a ginseng field from Pocheon, Korea.
