= Nocardioides marinisabuli =

Scientific classification
- Domain: Bacteria
- Kingdom: Bacillati
- Phylum: Actinomycetota
- Class: Actinomycetia
- Order: Propionibacteriales
- Family: Nocardioidaceae
- Genus: Nocardioides
- Species: N. marinisabuli

Binomial name
- Nocardioides marinisabuli Lee et al. 2007

Type strain
- DSM 18965; JBRI 2003; KCCM 42681; SBS-12

Species of bacterium

Nocardioides marinisabuli is a Gram-positive and non-motile bacterium from the genus Nocardioides which has been isolated from beach sand in Jeju, Korea.
