= Nocardioides plantarum =

Scientific classification
- Domain: Bacteria
- Kingdom: Bacillati
- Phylum: Actinomycetota
- Class: Actinomycetia
- Order: Propionibacteriales
- Family: Nocardioidaceae
- Genus: Nocardioides
- Species: N. plantarum

Binomial name
- Nocardioides plantarum Collins et al. 1994

Type strain
- ATCC 51889; CIP 104157; DSM 11054; Grainger J70; IMSNU 22067; J70; JCM 9626; KCTC 9577; LMG 16210; M. D. Collins; NCIMB 12834; VKM Ac-1998

Species of bacterium

Nocardioides plantarum is a bacterium from the genus Nocardioides which has been isolated from herbage.
