= Nocardioides pacificus =

Scientific classification
- Domain: Bacteria
- Kingdom: Bacillati
- Phylum: Actinomycetota
- Class: Actinomycetia
- Order: Propionibacteriales
- Family: Nocardioidaceae
- Genus: Nocardioides
- Species: N. pacificus

Binomial name
- Nocardioides pacificus Fan et al. 2014

Type strain
- DSM 27278; JCM 19260; XH274

Species of bacterium

Nocardioides pacificus is a Gram-positive, aerobic, rod-shaped and non-motile bacterium from the genus Nocardioides which has been isolated from deep sub-seafloor sediments from the South Pacific Gyre.
