= Nocardioides cavernae =

Scientific classification
- Domain: Bacteria
- Kingdom: Bacillati
- Phylum: Actinomycetota
- Class: Actinomycetia
- Order: Propionibacteriales
- Family: Nocardioidaceae
- Genus: Nocardioides
- Species: N. cavernae

Binomial name
- Nocardioides cavernae Han et al. 2017

Type strain
- DSM 29950; KCTC 39551; YIM A1136

Species of bacterium

Nocardioides cavernae is a Gram-positive, rod-shaped and aerobic bacterium from the genus Nocardioides which has been isolated from soil from a karst cave from Xingye County, China.
