= Nocardioides ganghwensis =

Scientific classification
- Domain: Bacteria
- Kingdom: Bacillati
- Phylum: Actinomycetota
- Class: Actinomycetia
- Order: Propionibacteriales
- Family: Nocardioidaceae
- Genus: Nocardioides
- Species: N. ganghwensis

Binomial name
- Nocardioides ganghwensis Yi and Chun 2004

Type strain
- IMSNU 14028; JCM 12124; KCTC 9920; JC2055

Species of bacterium

Nocardioides ganghwensis is a strictly aerobic, rod-shaped and non-motile bacterium from the genus Nocardioides which has been isolated from tidal flat sediments on Ganghwa Island, Korea.
