= Nocardioides massiliensis =

Scientific classification
- Domain: Bacteria
- Kingdom: Bacillati
- Phylum: Actinomycetota
- Class: Actinomycetia
- Order: Propionibacteriales
- Family: Nocardioidaceae
- Genus: Nocardioides
- Species: N. massiliensis

Binomial name
- Nocardioides massiliensis Dubourg et al. 2016

Type strain
- CSUR P894; DSM 28216; GD13

Species of bacterium

Nocardioides massiliensis is a bacterium from the genus Nocardioides which has been isolated from human feces from Marseille, France.
