= Nocardioides phosphati =

Scientific classification
- Domain: Bacteria
- Kingdom: Bacillati
- Phylum: Actinomycetota
- Class: Actinomycetia
- Order: Propionibacteriales
- Family: Nocardioidaceae
- Genus: Nocardioides
- Species: N. phosphati

Binomial name
- Nocardioides phosphati Xie et al. 2017

Type strain
- CGMCC 4.7371; DSM 104026; WYH11-7

Species of bacterium

Nocardioides phosphati is a Gram-positive, non-spore-forming and non-motile bacterium from the genus Nocardioides which has been isolated from a phosphate mine in Yunnan, China.
