= Aeromicrobium erythreum =

Scientific classification
- Domain: Bacteria
- Kingdom: Bacillati
- Phylum: Actinomycetota
- Class: Actinomycetia
- Order: Propionibacteriales
- Family: Nocardioidaceae
- Genus: Aeromicrobium
- Species: A. erythreum

Binomial name
- Aeromicrobium erythreum Miller et al. 1991

Type strain
- ATCC 51598; DSM 8599; IFO 15406; JCM 8359; KCTC 9586; LMG 16472; NBRC 15406; NCIMB 13258; NRRL B-3381

Species of bacterium

Aeromicrobium erythreum is a bacterium from the genus Aeromicrobium which has been isolated from soil from Puerto Rico. Aeromicrobium erythreum produces erythromycin.
