= Marmoricola solisilvae =

Scientific classification
- Domain: Bacteria
- Kingdom: Bacillati
- Phylum: Actinomycetota
- Class: Actinomycetes
- Order: Propionibacteriales
- Family: Nocardioidaceae
- Genus: Marmoricola
- Species: M. solisilvae

Binomial name
- Marmoricola solisilvae Kim et al. 2015

Type strain
- DSM 27140; KACC 17307; KIS18-7; NBRC 109601

Species of bacterium

Marmoricola solisilvae is a bacterium from the genus Marmoricola which has been isolated from forest soil from the Baengnyeong Island, Korea.
