= Nocardioides albertanoniae =

Scientific classification
- Domain: Bacteria
- Kingdom: Bacillati
- Phylum: Actinomycetota
- Class: Actinomycetia
- Order: Propionibacteriales
- Family: Nocardioidaceae
- Genus: Nocardioides
- Species: N. albertanoniae

Binomial name
- Nocardioides albertanoniae Alias-Villegas et al. 2013

Type strain
- CD40127; CECT 8014; DSM 25218

Species of bacterium

Nocardioides albertanoniae is a gram-positive, aerobic and non-spore-forming bacterium from the genus Nocardioides that has been isolated from green biofilm growing on a wall of the Domitilla Catacombs in Rome, Italy.
