= Nocardioides exalbidus =

Scientific classification
- Domain: Bacteria
- Kingdom: Bacillati
- Phylum: Actinomycetota
- Class: Actinomycetia
- Order: Propionibacteriales
- Family: Nocardioidaceae
- Genus: Nocardioides
- Species: N. agariphilus

Binomial name
- Nocardioides agariphilus Li et al. 2007

Type strain
- CCTCC AA206016; IAM 15416; JCM 23199; RC825

Species of bacterium

Nocardioides exalbidus is a rod-shaped and non-motile bacterium from the genus Nocardioides which has been isolated from lichen on the Izu Ōshima Island, Japan.
