= Nocardioides insulae =

Scientific classification
- Domain: Bacteria
- Kingdom: Bacillati
- Phylum: Actinomycetota
- Class: Actinomycetia
- Order: Propionibacteriales
- Family: Nocardioidaceae
- Genus: Nocardioides
- Species: N. insulae

Binomial name
- Nocardioides insulae Yoon et al. 2007

Type strain
- CIP 109626; DS-51; DSM 17944; JCM 15308; KCTC 19180

Species of bacterium

Nocardioides insulae is a Gram-positive bacterium from the genus Nocardioides which has been isolated from soil from Dokdo, Korea.
