= Nocardioides nitrophenolicus =

Scientific classification
- Domain: Bacteria
- Kingdom: Bacillati
- Phylum: Actinomycetota
- Class: Actinomycetia
- Order: Propionibacteriales
- Family: Nocardioidaceae
- Genus: Nocardioides
- Species: N. nitrophenolicus

Binomial name
- Nocardioides nitrophenolicus Yoon et al. 1999

Type strain
- CIP 107017; DSM 15529; JCM 10703; KCTC 457BP; NSP41

Species of bacterium

Nocardioides nitrophenolicus is a bacterium from the genus Nocardioides which has been isolated from industrial wastewater. Nocardioides nitrophenolicus has the ability to degrade p-nitrophenol.
