= Nocardioides zeae =

Scientific classification
- Domain: Bacteria
- Kingdom: Bacillati
- Phylum: Actinomycetota
- Class: Actinomycetia
- Order: Propionibacteriales
- Family: Nocardioidaceae
- Genus: Nocardioides
- Species: N. zeae

Binomial name
- Nocardioides zeae Glaeser et al. 2014

Type strain
- CIP 110696; JM-1068; LMG 28079

Species of bacterium

Nocardioides zeae is a Gram-positive and aerobic bacterium from the genus Nocardioides which has been isolated from the internal stem tissue of a corn plant (Zea mays) from the Smith Research Center in Tallassee, Alabama. The major menaquinone of Nocardioides zeae is MK-8(H4).
