= Nocardioides daeguensis =

Scientific classification
- Domain: Bacteria
- Kingdom: Bacillati
- Phylum: Actinomycetota
- Class: Actinomycetia
- Order: Propionibacteriales
- Family: Nocardioidaceae
- Genus: Nocardioides
- Species: N. daeguensis

Binomial name
- Nocardioides daeguensis Cui et al. 2013

Type strain
- JCM 17460; KCTC 19799; 2C1-5

Species of bacterium

Nocardioides daeguensis is a gram-positive, rod-shaped, nitrate-reducing and non-spore-forming bacterium from the genus Nocardioides that has been isolated from sludge from an industrial wastewater treatment plant in Daegu, South Korea.
