= Nocardioides aquiterrae =

Scientific classification
- Domain: Bacteria
- Kingdom: Bacillati
- Phylum: Actinomycetota
- Class: Actinomycetia
- Order: Propionibacteriales
- Family: Nocardioidaceae
- Genus: Nocardioides
- Species: N. aquiterrae

Binomial name
- Nocardioides aquiterrae Yoon et al. 2004

Type strain
- CIP 108375; DSM 17295; GW-9; JCM 11813; KCCM 41647

Species of bacterium

Nocardioides aquiterrae is a bacterium from the genus Nocardioides that has been isolated from groundwater in South Korea.
