= Nocardioides montaniterrae =

Scientific classification
- Domain: Bacteria
- Kingdom: Bacillati
- Phylum: Actinomycetota
- Class: Actinomycetia
- Order: Propionibacteriales
- Family: Nocardioidaceae
- Genus: Nocardioides
- Species: N. montaniterrae

Binomial name
- Nocardioides montaniterrae Srinivasan et al. 2015

Type strain
- JCM 19684; KEMC 9004-134; SR-1

Species of bacterium

Nocardioides montaniterrae is a bacterium from the genus Nocardioides which has been isolated from mountain soil.
