= Nocardioides marinquilinus =

Scientific classification
- Domain: Bacteria
- Kingdom: Bacillati
- Phylum: Actinomycetota
- Class: Actinomycetia
- Order: Propionibacteriales
- Family: Nocardioidaceae
- Genus: Nocardioides
- Species: N. marinquilinus

Binomial name
- Nocardioides marinquilinus Cho et al. 2013

Type strain
- CL-GY44; JCM 18459; KCCM 90109

Species of bacterium

Nocardioides marinquilinus is a Gram-positive, strictly aerobic, non-spore-forming, short rod-shaped and non-motile bacterium from the genus Nocardioides which has been isolated from coastal seawater in Korea.
