= Nocardioides panacihumi =

Scientific classification
- Domain: Bacteria
- Kingdom: Bacillati
- Phylum: Actinomycetota
- Class: Actinomycetia
- Order: Propionibacteriales
- Family: Nocardioidaceae
- Genus: Nocardioides
- Species: N. panacihumi

Binomial name
- Nocardioides panacihumi An et al. 2007

Type strain
- CIP 109747; DSM 18660; Gsoil 616; JCM 15309; KCTC 19187; Lee Gsoil 616; LMG 23811

Species of bacterium

Nocardioides panacihumi is a Gram-positive, strictly aerobic, non-spore-forming and non-motile bacterium from the genus Nocardioides which has been isolated from soil from a ginseng field in Pocheon, Korea.
