= Nocardioides pakistanensis =

Scientific classification
- Domain: Bacteria
- Kingdom: Bacillati
- Phylum: Actinomycetota
- Class: Actinomycetia
- Order: Propionibacteriales
- Family: Nocardioidaceae
- Genus: Nocardioides
- Species: N. pakistanensis

Binomial name
- Nocardioides pakistanensis Amin et al. 2016

Type strain
- DSM 29942; JCM 30630; NCCP-1340

Species of bacterium

Nocardioides pakistanensis is a Gram-positive and non-spore-forming bacterium from the genus Nocardioides which has been isolated from water from the hot spring Tatta Pani in Pakistan.
