= Marmoricola korecus =

Scientific classification
- Domain: Bacteria
- Kingdom: Bacillati
- Phylum: Actinomycetota
- Class: Actinomycetia
- Order: Propionibacteriales
- Family: Nocardioidaceae
- Genus: Marmoricola
- Species: M. korecus

Binomial name
- Marmoricola korecus Lee et al. 2011

Type strain
- DSM 22128; KCTC 19596; Sco-A36

Species of bacterium

Marmoricola korecus is a Gram-positive, aerobic and non-motile bacterium from the genus Marmoricola which has been isolated from volcanic ash from Jeju, Korea.
