= Nocardioides lentus =

Scientific classification
- Domain: Bacteria
- Kingdom: Bacillati
- Phylum: Actinomycetota
- Class: Actinomycetia
- Order: Propionibacteriales
- Family: Nocardioidaceae
- Genus: Nocardioides
- Species: N. lentus

Binomial name
- Nocardioides lentus Yoon et al. 2006

Type strain
- DSM 16315; JCM 14046; KCTC 19039; KSL-17

Species of bacterium

Nocardioides lentus is a Gram-positive bacterium from the genus Nocardioides which has been isolated from alkaline soil in Korea.
