= Nocardioides pyridinolyticus =

Scientific classification
- Domain: Bacteria
- Kingdom: Bacillati
- Phylum: Actinomycetota
- Class: Actinomycetia
- Order: Propionibacteriales
- Family: Nocardioidaceae
- Genus: Nocardioides
- Species: N. pyridinolyticus

Binomial name
- Nocardioides pyridinolyticus Yoon et al. 1997

Type strain
- CIP 106800; DSM 15530; JCM 10369; KCTC 74BP; OS4

Species of bacterium

Nocardioides pyridinolyticus is a pyridine-degrading bacterium from the genus Nocardioides.
