= Nocardioides salarius =

Scientific classification
- Domain: Bacteria
- Kingdom: Bacillati
- Phylum: Actinomycetota
- Class: Actinomycetia
- Order: Propionibacteriales
- Family: Nocardioidaceae
- Genus: Nocardioides
- Species: N. salarius

Binomial name
- Nocardioides salarius Kim et al. 2008

Type strain
- CL-Z59; DSM 18239; KCCM 42320

Synonyms
- Nocardioides basaltis Kim et al. 2009

Species of bacterium

Nocardioides salarius is a bacterium from the genus Nocardioides which has been isolated from zooplankton from the South Sea near Korea.
