= Nocardioides hankookensis =

Scientific classification
- Domain: Bacteria
- Kingdom: Bacillati
- Phylum: Actinomycetota
- Class: Actinomycetia
- Order: Propionibacteriales
- Family: Nocardioidaceae
- Genus: Nocardioides
- Species: N. hankookensis

Binomial name
- Nocardioides hankookensis Yoon et al. 2008

Type strain
- CCUG 54522; DS-30; JCM 15302; KCTC 19246

Species of bacterium

Nocardioides hankookensis is a Gram-positive, rod-shaped and non-motile bacterium from the genus Nocardioides which has been isolated from soil from Dokdo, Korea.
