= Nocardioides luteus =

Scientific classification
- Domain: Bacteria
- Kingdom: Bacillati
- Phylum: Actinomycetota
- Class: Actinomycetes
- Order: Propionibacteriales
- Family: Nocardioidaceae
- Genus: Nocardioides
- Species: N. luteus

Binomial name
- Nocardioides luteus Prauser 1985

Type strain
- ATCC 43052; CCUG 37986; CIP 103450; DSM 43366; DSM 43811; IFO 14491; IMET 7830; IMSNU 22020; JCM 3358; KCTC 9575; LMG 16209; NBRC 14491; NCIB 11455; CIMB 11455; Prauser 939-9; VKM Ac-1246

Species of bacterium

Nocardioides luteus is a Gram-positive, non-motile bacterium from the genus Nocardioides. This species has been isolated from soil in Khartoum, Sudan. The C-10 Deacetylase from Nocardioides luteus can be used for enzymatic hydrolysis for producing 10-Deacetyl Baccatin III.

N. luteus can form branched, vegetative hyphae, although it has also been known to form rods and cocci. This variety of morphologies occurs as N. luteus forms a "well-developed mycelium", with the aerial hyphae being less branched, and begins to fragment into rods and cocci. These rods and cocci can go onto to form new mycelia. The primary mycelia appear yellow, to orange-yellow depending on the age of the culture, with the aerial mycelia appearing white or cream-coloured.

This species has a DNA G+C content of between 74.6 and 74.8%.
