= Nocardioides echinoideorum =

Scientific classification
- Domain: Bacteria
- Kingdom: Bacillati
- Phylum: Actinomycetota
- Class: Actinomycetia
- Order: Propionibacteriales
- Family: Nocardioidaceae
- Genus: Nocardioides
- Species: N. echinoideorum

Binomial name
- Nocardioides echinoideorum Lin et al. 2015

Type strain
- BCRC 16974; JCM 30276; CC-CZW004

Species of bacterium

Nocardioides echinoideorum is a Gram-positive, aerobic, rod-shaped and non-motil bacterium from the genus Nocardioides which has been isolated from the sea urchin Tripneustes gratilla near Penghu Island, Taiwan.
