= Aeromicrobium ginsengisoli =

Scientific classification
- Domain: Bacteria
- Kingdom: Bacillati
- Phylum: Actinomycetota
- Class: Actinomycetia
- Order: Propionibacteriales
- Family: Nocardioidaceae
- Genus: Aeromicrobium
- Species: A. ginsengisoli

Binomial name
- Aeromicrobium ginsengisoli Kim et al. 2008

Type strain
- Gsoil 098; JCM 14732; KCTC 19207; GBS 39

Species of bacterium

Aeromicrobium ginsengisoli is a Gram-positive, non-spore-forming and non-motile bacterium from the genus Aeromicrobium which has been isolated from soil from a ginseng field in Daejeon, Korea.
