= Nocardioides ginkgobilobae =

Scientific classification
- Domain: Bacteria
- Kingdom: Bacillati
- Phylum: Actinomycetota
- Class: Actinomycetia
- Order: Propionibacteriales
- Family: Nocardioidaceae
- Genus: Nocardioides
- Species: N. ginkgobilobae

Binomial name
- Nocardioides ginkgobilobae Xu et al. 2016

Type strain
- DSM 100492; KCTC 39594; SYP-A7303

Species of bacterium

Nocardioides ginkgobilobae is a Gram-positive and aerobic bacterium from the genus Nocardioides which has been isolated from the roots of the tree Ginkgo biloba from Dandong, China.
