= Mumia xiangluensis =

Scientific classification
- Domain: Bacteria
- Kingdom: Bacillati
- Phylum: Actinomycetota
- Class: Actinomycetia
- Order: Propionibacteriales
- Family: Nocardioidaceae
- Genus: Mumia
- Species: M. xiangluensis

Binomial name
- Mumia xiangluensis Zhou et al. 2016

Type strain
- CGMCC 4.7305; DSM 101040; NEAU-KD1

Species of bacterium

Mumia xiangluensis is a bacterium from the genus Mumia which has been isolated from the rhizosphere of the plant Peucedanum praeruptorum from Mount Xianglu, China.
