= Nocardioides iriomotensis =

Scientific classification
- Domain: Bacteria
- Kingdom: Bacillati
- Phylum: Actinomycetota
- Class: Actinomycetia
- Order: Propionibacteriales
- Family: Nocardioidaceae
- Genus: Nocardioides
- Species: N. iriomotensis

Binomial name
- Nocardioides iriomotensis Yamamura et al. 2011

Type strain
- IR27-S3; JCM 17985; KACC 14926; NBRC 105384

Species of bacterium

Nocardioides iriomotensis is a Gram-positive, aerobic, non-spore-forming and non-motile bacterium from the genus Nocardioides which has been isolated from forest soil from Okinawa, Japan.
