= Marmoricola aurantiacus =

Scientific classification
- Domain: Bacteria
- Kingdom: Bacillati
- Phylum: Actinomycetota
- Class: Actinomycetia
- Order: Propionibacteriales
- Family: Nocardioidaceae
- Genus: Marmoricola
- Species: M. aurantiacus

Binomial name
- Marmoricola aurantiacus Urzì et al. 2000

Type strain
- BC 361; CIP 106770; DSM 12652; JCM 10917; NCIMB 13748

Species of bacterium

Marmoricola aurantiacus is a Gram-positive and aerobic bacterium from the genus Marmoricola which has been isolated from a marble statue in Germany.
