= Nocardioides panacisoli =

Scientific classification
- Domain: Bacteria
- Kingdom: Bacillati
- Phylum: Actinomycetota
- Class: Actinomycetia
- Order: Propionibacteriales
- Family: Nocardioidaceae
- Genus: Nocardioides
- Species: N. panacisoli

Binomial name
- Nocardioides panacisoli Cho et al. 2010

Type strain
- DSM 21348; Gsoil 346; JCM 16953; KCTC 19470

Species of bacterium

Nocardioides panacisoli is a Gram-positive, non-spore-forming and rod-shaped bacterium from the genus Nocardioides which has been isolated from soil from a ginseng field in Pocheon, Korea.
