= Nocardioides alkalitolerans =

Scientific classification
- Domain: Bacteria
- Kingdom: Bacillati
- Phylum: Actinomycetota
- Class: Actinomycetia
- Order: Propionibacteriales
- Family: Nocardioidaceae
- Genus: Nocardioides
- Species: N. alkalitolerans

Binomial name
- Nocardioides alkalitolerans Yoon et al. 2005

Type strain
- BCRC 16826; CCRC 16826; CIP 108736; DSM 16699; JCM 13365; KCTC 19037; KSL-1

Species of bacterium

Nocardioides alkalitolerans is a gram-positive bacterium from the genus Nocardioides that has been isolated from soil in South Korea.
