= Aeromicrobium choanae =

Scientific classification
- Domain: Bacteria
- Kingdom: Bacillati
- Phylum: Actinomycetota
- Class: Actinomycetia
- Order: Propionibacteriales
- Family: Nocardioidaceae
- Genus: Aeromicrobium
- Species: A. choanae

Binomial name
- Aeromicrobium choanae Ber et al. 2017

Type strain
- 9H-4; CCM 8650; LMG 29165

Species of bacterium

Aeromicrobium choanae is a Gram-positive and non-spore-forming bacterium from the genus Aeromicrobium which has been isolated from the bird Sylvia borin.
