= Nocardioides fonticola =

Scientific classification
- Domain: Bacteria
- Kingdom: Bacillati
- Phylum: Actinomycetota
- Class: Actinomycetia
- Order: Propionibacteriales
- Family: Nocardioidaceae
- Genus: Nocardioides
- Species: N. fonticola

Binomial name
- Nocardioides fonticola Chou et al. 2008

Type strain
- BCRC 16874; Chen NAA-13; JCM 16703; LMG 24213; NAA-13

Species of bacterium

Nocardioides fonticola is a Gram-positive and rod-shaped bacterium from the genus Nocardioides which has been isolated from a freshwater spring in Kaohsiung, Taiwan.
