= Aeromicrobium tamlense =

Scientific classification
- Domain: Bacteria
- Kingdom: Bacillati
- Phylum: Actinomycetota
- Class: Actinomycetia
- Order: Propionibacteriales
- Family: Nocardioidaceae
- Genus: Aeromicrobium
- Species: A. tamlense

Binomial name
- Aeromicrobium tamlense Lee and Kim 2007

Type strain
- JCM 13811; NRRL B-24466; SSW1-57

Species of bacterium

Aeromicrobium tamlense is a Gram-positive, rod-shaped and non-motile bacterium from the genus Aeromicrobium which has been isolated from dried seaweed from Jeju Island, Korea.
