= Nocardioides aquaticus =

Scientific classification
- Domain: Bacteria
- Kingdom: Bacillati
- Phylum: Actinomycetota
- Class: Actinomycetia
- Order: Propionibacteriales
- Family: Nocardioidaceae
- Genus: Nocardioides
- Species: N. aquaticus

Binomial name
- Nocardioides aquaticus Lawson et al. 2000

Type strain
- ATCC BAA-164; CIP 106993; DSM 11439; EL-17K; JCM 11266; NBRC 100371; NCFB 3076; NCIMB 703076

Species of bacterium

Nocardioides aquaticus is a species of Gram-positive, non-motile, aerobic bacteria.
