= Nocardioides kribbensis =

Scientific classification
- Domain: Bacteria
- Kingdom: Bacillati
- Phylum: Actinomycetota
- Class: Actinomycetia
- Order: Propionibacteriales
- Family: Nocardioidaceae
- Genus: Nocardioides
- Species: N. kribbensis

Binomial name
- Nocardioides kribbensis Yoon et al. 2005

Type strain
- CIP 108882; DSM 16314; JCM 13594; KCTC 19038; KSL-2

Species of bacterium

Nocardioides kribbensis is a bacterium from the genus Nocardioides which has been isolated from alkaline soil in Korea.
