= Aeromicrobium alkaliterrae =

Scientific classification
- Domain: Bacteria
- Kingdom: Bacillati
- Phylum: Actinomycetota
- Class: Actinomycetia
- Order: Propionibacteriales
- Family: Nocardioidaceae
- Genus: Aeromicrobium
- Species: A. alkaliterrae

Binomial name
- Aeromicrobium alkaliterrae Yoon et al. 2005

Type strain
- BCRC 16830; CCRC 16830; CIP 108938; DSM 16824; JCM 13518; KCTC 19073; KSL-107

Species of bacterium

Aeromicrobium alkaliterrae is a Gram-positive, aerobic and non-motile bacterium from the genus Aeromicrobium which has been isolated from soil in Kwangchun in Korea.
