= Nocardioides zeicaulis =

Scientific classification
- Domain: Bacteria
- Kingdom: Bacillati
- Phylum: Actinomycetota
- Class: Actinomycetia
- Order: Propionibacteriales
- Family: Nocardioidaceae
- Genus: Nocardioides
- Species: N. zeicaulis

Binomial name
- Nocardioides zeicaulis Kämpfer et al. 2016

Type strain
- CCM 8654; CIP 110980; JM-601

Species of bacterium

Nocardioides zeicaulis is a Gram-positive and aerobic bacterium from the genus Nocardioides which has been isolated from the stem of a maize plant (Zea mays).
