= Marmoricola endophyticus =

Scientific classification
- Domain: Bacteria
- Kingdom: Bacillati
- Phylum: Actinomycetota
- Class: Actinomycetia
- Order: Propionibacteriales
- Family: Nocardioidaceae
- Genus: Marmoricola
- Species: M. endophyticus

Binomial name
- Marmoricola endophyticus Jiang et al. 2017

Type strain
- CGMCC 1.16067; KCTC 39789; 8BXZ-J1

Species of bacterium

Marmoricola endophyticus is a Gram-positive, aerobic, non-spore-forming, short rod-shaped, endophytic and non-motile bacterium from the genus Marmoricola which has been isolated from the tree, Thespesia populnea, from the Beilun Estuary Mangrove Forest National Nature Reserve, China.
