= Nocardioides dokdonensis =

Scientific classification
- Domain: Bacteria
- Kingdom: Bacillati
- Phylum: Actinomycetota
- Class: Actinomycetia
- Order: Propionibacteriales
- Family: Nocardioidaceae
- Genus: Nocardioides
- Species: N. dokdonensis

Binomial name
- Nocardioides dokdonensis Park et al. 2008

Type strain
- JCM 14815; KCTC 19309; FR1436

Species of bacterium

Nocardioides dokdonensis is a bacterium from the genus Nocardioides which has been isolated from sand sediments from the beach of the Liancourt Rocks, Korea.
