= Aeromicrobium fastidiosum =

Scientific classification
- Domain: Bacteria
- Kingdom: Bacillati
- Phylum: Actinomycetota
- Class: Actinomycetia
- Order: Propionibacteriales
- Family: Nocardioidaceae
- Genus: Aeromicrobium
- Species: A. fastidiosum

Binomial name
- Aeromicrobium fastidiosum (Collins and Stackebrandt 1989) Tamura and Yokota 1994

Type strain
- ATCC 49363; CCUG 35026; Collins J41; DSM 10552; IFO 14897; IMSNU 22010; J1; J41; JCM 8088; KCTC 9576; LMG 16205; NBRC 14897; NCIB 12713; NCIMB 12713; VKM Ac-1324

Synonyms
- Nocardioides fastidiosa Collins and Stackebrandt 1989; Nocardioides fastidiosus corrig. Collins and Stackebrandt 1989

Species of bacterium

Aeromicrobium fastidiosum is a bacterium from the genus Aeromicrobium.
