= Aeromicrobium flavum =

Scientific classification
- Domain: Bacteria
- Kingdom: Bacillati
- Phylum: Actinomycetota
- Class: Actinomycetia
- Order: Propionibacteriales
- Family: Nocardioidaceae
- Genus: Aeromicrobium
- Species: A. flavum

Binomial name
- Aeromicrobium flavum Tang et al. 2008

Type strain
- CCTCC AB 206046; DSM 19355; JCM 16538; TYLN1

Species of bacterium

Aeromicrobium flavum is a Gram-positive facultatively anaerobic and non-motile bacterium from the genus Aeromicrobium which has been isolated from air from the Wuhan University campus in China.
