= Nocardioides aromaticivorans =

Scientific classification
- Domain: Bacteria
- Kingdom: Bacillati
- Phylum: Actinomycetota
- Class: Actinomycetia
- Order: Propionibacteriales
- Family: Nocardioidaceae
- Genus: Nocardioides
- Species: N. aromaticivorans

Binomial name
- Nocardioides aromaticivorans Kubota et al. 2005

Type strain
- CIP 108782; DSM 15131; H-1; IAM 14992; JCM 11674

Species of bacterium

Nocardioides aromaticivorans is a gram-positive non-motile bacterium from the genus Nocardioides that has been isolated from a river contaminated with dioxin in Kanagawa, Japan. Nocardioides aromaticivorans has the ability to degrade dibenzofuran and carbazole.
