= Nocardioides alpinus =

Scientific classification
- Domain: Bacteria
- Kingdom: Bacillati
- Phylum: Actinomycetota
- Class: Actinomycetia
- Order: Propionibacteriales
- Family: Nocardioidaceae
- Genus: Nocardioides
- Species: N. alpinus

Binomial name
- Nocardioides alpinus Zhang et al. 2012

Type strain
- CGMCC 1.10697; Cr7-14; DSM 23325; JCM 18960; LMG 26053

Species of bacterium

Nocardioides alpinus is a gram-positive, rod-shaped, psychrophilic and non-motile bacterium from the genus Nocardioides that has been isolated from cryoconite of an alpine glacier in the Ötztal Alps in Austria.
