= Marmoricola silvestris =

Scientific classification
- Domain: Bacteria
- Kingdom: Bacillati
- Phylum: Actinomycetota
- Class: Actinomycetia
- Order: Propionibacteriales
- Family: Nocardioidaceae
- Genus: Marmoricola
- Species: M. silvestris

Binomial name
- Marmoricola silvestris Schumann et al. 2018

Type strain
- DSM 104694; LMG 30008; S20-100

Species of bacterium

Marmoricola silvestris is a Gram-positive bacterium from the genus Marmoricola which has been isolated from alpine forest soil.
