= Nocardioides ginsengisoli =

Scientific classification
- Domain: Bacteria
- Kingdom: Bacillati
- Phylum: Actinomycetota
- Class: Actinomycetia
- Order: Propionibacteriales
- Family: Nocardioidaceae
- Genus: Nocardioides
- Species: N. ginsengisoli

Binomial name
- Nocardioides ginsengisoli Cui et al. 2009

Type strain
- CCUG 52478; DSM 17921; Gsoil 1124; JCM 16930; KCTC 19135

Species of bacterium

Nocardioides ginsengisoli is a Gram-positive, rod-shaped and non-spore-forming bacterium from the genus Nocardioides which has been isolated from soil from a ginseng field in Pocheon, Korea.
