= Nocardioides litoris =

Scientific classification
- Domain: Bacteria
- Kingdom: Bacillati
- Phylum: Actinomycetota
- Class: Actinomycetia
- Order: Propionibacteriales
- Family: Nocardioidaceae
- Genus: Nocardioides
- Species: N. litoris

Binomial name
- Nocardioides litoris Lee et al. 2017

Type strain
- 002-2; DSM 103718; KCTC 39838

Species of bacterium

Nocardioides litoris is a Gram-positive bacterium from the genus Nocardioides which has been isolated from sediments from the Taean seashore in Korea.
