= Nocardioides ginsengisegetis =

Scientific classification
- Domain: Bacteria
- Kingdom: Bacillati
- Phylum: Actinomycetota
- Class: Actinomycetia
- Order: Propionibacteriales
- Family: Nocardioidaceae
- Genus: Nocardioides
- Species: N. ginsengisegetis

Binomial name
- Nocardioides ginsengisegetis Im et al. 2011

Type strain
- DSM 21349; Gsoil 485; KACC 14269; KCTC 19469

Species of bacterium

Nocardioides ginsengisegetis is a Gram-positive, rod-shaped and non-spore-forming bacterium from the genus Nocardioides which has been isolated from soil from a ginseng field in Pocheon, Korea.
