= Nocardioides marinus =

Scientific classification
- Domain: Bacteria
- Kingdom: Bacillati
- Phylum: Actinomycetota
- Class: Actinomycetia
- Order: Propionibacteriales
- Family: Nocardioidaceae
- Genus: Nocardioides
- Species: N. marinus

Binomial name
- Nocardioides marinus Choi et al. 2007

Type strain
- CL-DD14; DSM 18248; JCM 15615; KCCM 42321

Species of bacterium

Nocardioides marinus is a Gram-positive, slightly halophilic and rod-shaped bacterium from the genus Nocardioides which has been isolated from seawater from the Sea of Japan near Korea.
