= Marmoricola aquaticus =

Scientific classification
- Domain: Bacteria
- Kingdom: Bacillati
- Phylum: Actinomycetota
- Class: Actinomycetia
- Order: Propionibacteriales
- Family: Nocardioidaceae
- Genus: Marmoricola
- Species: M. aquaticus

Binomial name
- Marmoricola aquaticus De Menezes et al. 2015

Type strain
- CBMAI 1089; DSM 28169; B374

Species of bacterium

Marmoricola aquaticus is a bacterium from the genus Marmoricola which has been isolated from the sponge Glodia corticostylifera in São Paulo, Brazil.
