= Nocardioides soli =

Scientific classification
- Domain: Bacteria
- Kingdom: Bacillati
- Phylum: Actinomycetota
- Class: Actinomycetia
- Order: Propionibacteriales
- Family: Nocardioidaceae
- Genus: Nocardioides
- Species: N. soli

Binomial name
- Nocardioides soli Sun et al. 2014

Type strain
- CCTCC AB 2012934; KACC 17152 mbc-2

Species of bacterium

Nocardioides soli is a Gram-positive, rod-shaped, carbendazim-degrading and motile bacterium from the genus Nocardioides.
