= Aeromicrobium massiliense =

Scientific classification
- Domain: Bacteria
- Kingdom: Bacillati
- Phylum: Actinomycetota
- Class: Actinomycetia
- Order: Propionibacteriales
- Family: Nocardioidaceae
- Genus: Aeromicrobium
- Species: A. massiliense

Binomial name
- Aeromicrobium massiliense Ramasamy et al. 2014

Type strain
- CSUR P158; DSM 25782; JC14

Species of bacterium

Aeromicrobium massiliense is a Gram-positive, aerobic, rod-shaped and motile bacterium from the genus Aeromicrobium which has been isolated from human feces in Senegal.
