= Nocardioides furvisabuli =

Scientific classification
- Domain: Bacteria
- Kingdom: Bacillati
- Phylum: Actinomycetota
- Class: Actinomycetes
- Order: Propionibacteriales
- Family: Nocardioidaceae
- Genus: Nocardioides
- Species: N. furvisabuli

Binomial name
- Nocardioides furvisabuli Lee 2007

Type strain
- CIP 109516; DSM 18445; JCM 13813; NRRL B-24465; SBS-26

Species of bacterium

Nocardioides furvisabuli is a Gram-positive and rod-shaped bacterium from the genus Nocardioides which has been isolated from black beach sand from the Samyang Beach on Jeju Island, Korea.
