= Nocardioides conyzicola =

Scientific classification
- Domain: Bacteria
- Kingdom: Bacillati
- Phylum: Actinomycetota
- Class: Actinomycetia
- Order: Propionibacteriales
- Family: Nocardioidaceae
- Genus: Nocardioides
- Species: N. conyzicola

Binomial name
- Nocardioides conyzicola Han et al. 2013

Type strain
- HWE 2-02; JCM 18531; KCTC 29121

Species of bacterium

Nocardioides conyzicola is a Gram-positive, non-spore-forming, rod-shaped and non-motile bacterium from the genus Nocardioides.
