= Nocardioides dubius =

Scientific classification
- Domain: Bacteria
- Kingdom: Bacillati
- Phylum: Actinomycetota
- Class: Actinomycetia
- Order: Propionibacteriales
- Family: Nocardioidaceae
- Genus: Nocardioides
- Species: N. dubius

Binomial name
- Nocardioides dubius Yoon et al. 2005

Type strain
- CIP 109028; DSM 19084; JCM 13008; KCTC 9992; KSL-104

Species of bacterium

Nocardioides dubius is a Gram-positive bacterium from the genus Nocardioides which has been isolated from alkaline soil in Kwangchun, Korea.
