= Nocardioides opuntiae =

Scientific classification
- Domain: Bacteria
- Kingdom: Bacillati
- Phylum: Actinomycetota
- Class: Actinomycetia
- Order: Propionibacteriales
- Family: Nocardioidaceae
- Genus: Nocardioides
- Species: N. opuntiae

Binomial name
- Nocardioides opuntiae Lee and Seong 2014

Type strain
- KCTC 19804; NBRC 107915; RS-11; OS1-21

Species of bacterium

Nocardioides opuntiae is a Gram-positive, aerobic, non-spore-forming and non-motile bacterium from the genus Nocardioides which has been isolated from rhizosphere soil from the cactus Opuntia ficus-indica var. sanboten from Jeju, Korea. Nocardioides opuntiae has a high GC-content.
