= Nocardioides baekrokdamisoli =

Scientific classification
- Domain: Bacteria
- Kingdom: Bacillati
- Phylum: Actinomycetota
- Class: Actinomycetia
- Order: Propionibacteriales
- Family: Nocardioidaceae
- Genus: Nocardioides
- Species: N. baekrokdamisoli

Binomial name
- Nocardioides baekrokdamisoli Lee et al. 2016

Type strain
- DSM 100725; KCTC 39748; NRRL B-65313; B2-12

Species of bacterium

Nocardioides baekrokdamisoli is a Gram-positive, non-spore-forming, short-rod-shaped and non-motile bacterium from the genus Nocardioides which has been isolated from sediments from Baekrodam lake, Korea.
