= Nocardioides caeni =

Scientific classification
- Domain: Bacteria
- Kingdom: Bacillati
- Phylum: Actinomycetota
- Class: Actinomycetia
- Order: Propionibacteriales
- Family: Nocardioidaceae
- Genus: Nocardioides
- Species: N. caeni

Binomial name
- Nocardioides caeni Yoon et al. 2009

Type strain
- CCUG 57506; KCTC 19600; MN8

Species of bacterium

Nocardioides caeni is a gram-positive and non-motile bacterium from the genus Nocardioides that has been isolated from sludge from domestic wastewater in Daejeon, South Korea.
