= Aeromicrobium halocynthiae =

Scientific classification
- Domain: Bacteria
- Kingdom: Bacillati
- Phylum: Actinomycetota
- Class: Actinomycetia
- Order: Propionibacteriales
- Family: Nocardioidaceae
- Genus: Aeromicrobium
- Species: A. halocynthiae

Binomial name
- Aeromicrobium halocynthiae Kim et al. 2010

Type strain
- JCM 15749; KCCM 90079; KME 001

Species of bacterium

Aeromicrobium halocynthiae is a Gram-positive, non-spore-forming, aerobic, rod-shaped and non-motile bacterium from the genus Aeromicrobium which has been isolated from the sea pineapple (Halocynthia roretzi) from the coast of Gangneungon, Korea. Aeromicrobium halocynthiae produces taurocholic acid.
