= Nocardioides ultimimeridianus =

Scientific classification
- Domain: Bacteria
- Kingdom: Bacillati
- Phylum: Actinomycetota
- Class: Actinomycetia
- Order: Propionibacteriales
- Family: Nocardioidaceae
- Genus: Nocardioides
- Species: N. ultimimeridianus

Binomial name
- Nocardioides ultimimeridianus Lee et al. 2011

Type strain
- DSM 19768; KCTC 19368; RP-B26

Species of bacterium

Nocardioides ultimimeridianus is a Gram-positive and rod-shaped bacterium from the genus Nocardioides which has been isolated from rhizosphere soil from the plant Peucedanum japonicum from Mara Island, Korea.
