= Aeromicrobium marinum =

Scientific classification
- Domain: Bacteria
- Kingdom: Bacillati
- Phylum: Actinomycetota
- Class: Actinomycetia
- Order: Propionibacteriales
- Family: Nocardioidaceae
- Genus: Aeromicrobium
- Species: A. marinum

Binomial name
- Aeromicrobium marinum Bruns et al. 2003

Type strain
- CIP 108216; DSM 15272; JCM 13314; LMG 21768; T2

Species of bacterium

Aeromicrobium marinum is a bacterium from the genus Aeromicrobium which has been isolated from surface water from the Wadden Sea near Germany.
