= Nocardioides hwasunensis =

Scientific classification
- Domain: Bacteria
- Kingdom: Bacillati
- Phylum: Actinomycetota
- Class: Actinomycetia
- Order: Propionibacteriales
- Family: Nocardioidaceae
- Genus: Nocardioides
- Species: N. hwasunensis

Binomial name
- Nocardioides hwasunensis Lee et al. 2008

Type strain
- DSM 18584; HFW-21; JCM 15307; KCTC 19197

Species of bacterium

Nocardioides hwasunensis is a Gram-positive, aerobic and non-motile bacterium from the genus Nocardioides which has been isolated from water from the beach of Hwasun and the coast of Jeju Island, South Korea.
