= Nocardioides lianchengensis =

Scientific classification
- Domain: Bacteria
- Kingdom: Bacillati
- Phylum: Actinomycetota
- Class: Actinomycetia
- Order: Propionibacteriales
- Family: Nocardioidaceae
- Genus: Nocardioides
- Species: N. lianchengensis

Binomial name
- Nocardioides lianchengensis Zhang et al. 2012

Type strain
- CGMCC 4.6858; D94-1; DSM 24663

Species of bacterium

Nocardioides lianchengensis is a Gram-positive, aerobic and rod-shaped bacterium from the genus Nocardioides which has been isolated from soil from Liancheng County, China.
