= Marmoricola =

Scientific classification
- Domain: Bacteria
- Kingdom: Bacillati
- Phylum: Actinomycetota
- Class: Actinomycetes
- Order: Propionibacteriales
- Family: Nocardioidaceae
- Genus: Marmoricola; Urzì et al. 2000

Type species
- Marmoricola aurantiacus Urzì et al. 2000

Species
- See text

Genus of bacteria

Marmoricola is a Gram-positive and chemoorganotrophic bacterial genus from the family of Nocardioidaceae.

== Phylogeny ==
The currently accepted taxonomy is based on the List of Prokaryotic names with Standing in Nomenclature (LPSN) and National Center for Biotechnology Information (NCBI).

16S rRNA based LTP_10_2024

- Marmoricola
  - - M. korecus Lee et al. 2011
    - - - M. aequoreus Lee 2007
        - M. aquaticus De Menezes et al. 2015
      - - M. aurantiacus Urzì et al. 2000
        - M. scoriae Lee and Lee 2010
  - - - M. pocheonensis Lee et al. 2016
      - - M. bigeumensis Dastager et al. 2008
        - M. caldifontis Habib et al. 2020
    - - M. terrae Kim et al. 2015
      - - - M. endophyticus Jiang et al. 2017
          - M. mangrovicus Li et al. 2019
        - - M. solisilvae Kim et al. 2015
          - - M. ginsengisoli Lee et al. 2016
            - M. silvestris Schumann et al. 2018

120 marker proteins based GTDB 10-RS226

- - - - Marmoricola_A
        - Marmoricola bigeumensis
        - Marmoricola caldifontis
    - Nocardioides_B & C
  - - - Marmoricola
        - - M. endophyticus
          - M. mangrovicus
        - - - M. aequoreus
            - - M. aurantiacus
              - M. scoriae
          - - M. pocheonensis
            - - M. ginsengisoli
              - M. solisilvae
    - Nocardioides & Nocardioides_A

Species incertae sedis:

- M. terrae Kim et al. 2015

== See also ==
- List of bacterial orders
- List of bacteria genera
