= Nocardioides =

Scientific classification
- Domain: Bacteria
- Kingdom: Bacillati
- Phylum: Actinomycetota
- Class: Actinomycetes
- Order: Propionibacteriales
- Family: Nocardioidaceae
- Genus: Nocardioides; Prauser 1976 (Approved Lists 1980)Species

Type species
- Nocardioides albus Prauser 1976 (Approved Lists 1980)

Species
- See text

Synonyms
- Pimelobacter Suzuki and Komagata 1983

Genus of bacteria

Nocardioides is a Gram-positive, mesophilic and aerobic bacterial genus from the family Nocardioidaceae.

== Phylogeny ==
The currently accepted taxonomy is based on the List of Prokaryotic names with Standing in Nomenclature (LPSN) and National Center for Biotechnology Information (NCBI).

16S rRNA based LTP_10_2024

- - - Nocardioides~
      - - Nocardioides pakistanensis Amin et al. 2016
        - Nocardioides speluncae Fang et al. 2019
      - - Nocardioides guangzhouensis Chen et al. 2020
        - - Nocardioides iriomotensis Yamamura et al. 2011
          - Nocardioides panacis Park et al. 2022
  - - - - Nocardioides~
          - Nocardioides echinoideorum Lin et al. 2015
          - Nocardioides pacificus Fan et al. 2014
      - Marmoricola
    - - Nocardioides
        - - N. massiliensis Dubourg et al. 2016
          - - N. mesophilus Dastager et al. 2010
            - "N. jiangsuensis" Wang et al. 2023
        - - N. donggukensis Kim et al. 2021
          - - - - N. cavernaquae Zhu et al. 2022
                - N. phosphati Xie et al. 2017
              - - N. daedukensis Yoon et al. 2010
                - N. jensenii (Suzuki and Komagata 1983) Collins et al. 1989
            - - - N. daejeonensis Woo et al. 2012
                - - N. alcanivorans Mitzscherling et al. 2022
                  - N. dubius Yoon et al. 2005
              - - - - N. campestrisoli Zhou et al. 2022
                    - - - N. gilvus Zhang et al. 2017
                        - N. houyundeii Wang et al. 2018
                      - - N. ochotonae Zhou et al. 2022
                        - N. solisilvae Sultanpuram, Mothe & Mohammed 2015
                  - - N. jishulii Dong et al. 2020
                    - - N. malaquae Zhang et al. 2021
                      - - N. daphniae Tóth et al. 2008
                        - - N. perillae Du et al. 2013
                          - N. yefusunii Huang et al. 2019
                - - - - N. alkalitolerans Yoon et al. 2005
                      - N. zeae Glaeser et al. 2014
                    - - N. dilutus corrig. Dastager et al. 2009
                      - - N. halotolerans Dastager et al. 2009
                        - - N. anomalus Park et al. 2020
                          - N. flavescens Zhang et al. 2020
                  - - - N. aquaticus Lawson et al. 2000
                      - - N. dongkuii Cheng et al. 2021
                        - - N. pantholopis Zhou et al. 2022
                          - - - N. dokdonensis Park et al. 2008
                              - N. marmotae Zhang et al. 2023
                            - - N. lianchengensis Zhang, Ma & Yu 2012
                              - - N. cremeus Wang et al. 2023
                                - - N. marinisabuli Lee, Hyun &Lee 2007
                                  - N. salarius Kim et al. 2008
                    - - - - - N. sediminis Dastager et al. 2009
                            - N. terrigena Yoon et al. 2007
                          - - N. ferulae Liu et al. 2019'
                            - - N. kribbensis Yoon et al. 2005
                              - N. oceani Wang et al. 2023
                        - - - - N. lijunqiniae Cheng et al. 2021
                              - - N. psychrotolerans Liu et al. 2013
                                - N. szechwanensis Liu et al. 2013
                            - - N. intraradicalis Huang et al. 2016
                              - - N. caricicola Song et al. 2011
                                - N. salsibiostraticola Cho et al. 2013
                          - - - N. fonticola Chou et al. 2008
                              - - N. abyssi Wang et al. 2023
                                - N. deserti Tuo et al. 2015
                            - - - N. aquiterrae Yoon et al. 2004
                                - N. hungaricus Tóth et al. 2011
                              - - N. pyridinolyticus Yoon et al. 1997
                                - - N. soli Sun et al. 2014 non Srinivasan et al. 2014
                                  - - N. hankookensis Yoon et al. 2008
                                    - - N. conyzicola Han et al. 2013
                                      - N. endophyticus Han et al. 2013
                      - - - - N. panaciterrulae Kim et al. 2019
                            - - N. luti Yoon et al. 2022
                              - - N. koreensis Dastager et al. 2008
                                - - N. ginsengisegetis Im et al. 2011
                                  - N. ungokensis Zhao et al. 2015
                          - - - - N. acrostichi Chen et al. 2021
                                - - - N. baekrokdamisoli
                                    - N. nematodiphilus Zhang et al. 2022
                                  - - N. terrae Zhang, Liu & Liu 2009
                                    - - N. opuntiae Lee and Seong 2014
                                      - N. panacihumi An et al. 2007
                              - - - - N. agrisoli Wang et al. 2017
                                    - N. mangrovi Chen et al. 2022
                                  - - N. ginkgobilobae Xu et al. 2016
                                    - N. marinus Choi et al. 2007
                                - - N. albertanoniae Alias-Villegas et al. 2013
                                  - - N. luteus Prauser 1985
                                    - - N. albus Prauser 1976
                                      - N. panzhihuensis corrig. Qin et al. 2012
                            - - - N. currus Park et al. 2018
                                - - N. allogilvus Zhang et al. 2018
                                  - N. piscis Hyun et al. 2022
                              - - N. seonyuensis Roh et al. 2020
                                - - N. baculatus Chhetri et al. 2021
                                  - - - N. potassii Liu et al. 2023
                                      - - N. glacieisoli Liu et al. 2015
                                        - N. zhouii Zhang et al. 2019
                                    - - - N. pini So et al. 2023
                                        - - N. cavernae Han et al. 2017
                                          - - N. flavus Wang, Zhou & Zhang 2016 non Singh & Yin 2016 non Ruan & Zhang 1979
                                            - N. zeicaulis Kämpfer et al. 2016
                                      - - N. pinisoli So et al. 2023
                                        - - N. hwasunensis Lee, Lee & Kim 2008
                                          - - - N. exalbidus Li, Xie & Yokota 2007
                                              - - N. ganghwensis Yi and Chun 2004
                                                - - N. oleivorans Schippers, Schumann & Sproer 2005
                                                  - N. palaemonis Kim et al. 2022
                                            - - N. eburneiflavus Roh et al. 2020
                                              - - N. okcheonensis Kim, Ham & Kim 2023
                                                - - N. alpinus Zhang et al. 2012
                                                  - - N. furvisabuli Lee 2007
                                                    - N. lacusdianchii Xiao et al. 2023
                        - - - N. gansuensis Wu et al. 2019
                            - N. insulae Yoon et al. 2007
                          - - - N. aestuarii Yi and Chun 2004
                              - - N. euryhalodurans Roh et al. 2020
                                - - N. kandeliae Liu et al. 2017
                                  - - N. sonneratiae Li et al. 2017
                                    - - N. coralli Shi et al. 2022
                                      - N. rotundus Wang, Li & Zhang 2016
                            - - N. taihuensis Qu et al. 2017
                              - - - N. bigeumensis Dastager et al. 2008
                                  - - - N. lentus Yoon et al. 2006
                                      - N. nanhaiensis Zhang et al. 2014
                                    - - N. ginsengagri Lee et al. 2012
                                      - - N. antarcticus Deng et al. 2015
                                        - - N. marinquilinus Cho et al. 2013
                                          - - - N. dongxiaopingii Zhang et al. 2020
                                              - N. litoris Lee et al. 2017
                                            - - N. plantarum Collins, Cockcroft & Wallbanks 1994
                                              - N. rubriscoriae corrig. Lee and Lee 2014
                                - - - N. cynanchi Suh et al. 2021
                                    - - N. agariphilus Dastager et al. 2008
                                      - N. islandensis corrig. Dastager et al. 2009
                                  - - N. tritolerans Dastager et al. 2009
                                    - - - N. sambongensis Hwang et al. 2020
                                        - - N. humi Kim et al. 2009
                                          - - N. daecheongensis Lim et al. 2014
                                            - - N. maradonensis Lee et al. 2011
                                              - N. ultimimeridianus Lee et al. 2011
                                      - - - - - N. humilatus Lee et al. 2022
                                              - N. stalactiti Zhou et al. 2021
                                            - - N. immobilis Lu et al. 2017
                                              - N. pelophilus Yan et al. 2018
                                          - - N. silvaticus Li et al. 2019
                                            - - N. panacisoli Cho et al. 2010
                                              - - N. litorisoli Wang et al. 2017
                                                - N. thalensis Khan et al. 2017
                                        - - N. vastitatis Liu et al. 2020
                                          - - N. montaniterrae Srinivasan et al. 2015
                                            - - N. faecalis Zhang et al. 2023
                                              - - N. daeguensis Cui et al. 2013
                                                - - - N. kongjuensis Yoon et al. 2006
                                                    - - N. caeni Yoon et al. 2009
                                                      - - N. albidus Singh et al. 2016
                                                        - N. convexus Park et al. 2020
                                                  - - N. nitrophenolicus Yoon et al. 1999
                                                    - - N. ginsengisoli Cui et al. 2009
                                                      - - N. aromaticivorans Kubota et al. 2005
                                                        - N. simplex (Jensen 1934) O'Donnell, Goodfellow & Minnikin 1983

120 marker proteins based GTDB 10-RS226

- - - Marmoricola_A
    - - Nocardioides_C
        "Nocardioides jiangsuensis"
      - Nocardioides_B
        - Nocardioides panacis
        - - Nocardioides iriomotensis
          - Nocardioides mesophilus
  - - Marmoricola
    - - Nocardioides_A
        Nocardioides massiliensis
      - Nocardioides
        - "N. limicola" Zhu et al. 2024
        - - - N. perillae
            - - N. lentus
              - - N. alkalitolerans
                - - "N. imazamoxiresistens" Wang et al. 2024
                  - N. zeae
          - - - N. speluncae
              - - - N. donggukensis
                  - N. guangzhouensis
                - - - N. daedukensis
                    - N. jensenii
                  - - - N. dubius
                      - - N. alcanivorans
                        - N. daejeonensis
                    - - N. cavernaquae
                      - - N. phosphati
                        - - "N. jejuensis" Jang et al. 2020
                          - N. jiangxiensis Wan et al. 2025
            - - - - - N. euryhalodurans
                    - - N. aestuarii
                      - N. coralli
                  - - N. rotundus
                    - - N. bigeumensis
                      - - N. cynanchi
                        - - N. agariphilus
                          - N. islandensis
                - - - N. houyundeii
                    - - - N. campestrisoli
                        - N. solisilvae
                      - - N. yefusunii
                        - - N. gilvus
                          - - N. malaquae
                            - - N. daphniae
                              - N. jishulii
                  - - - - N. sediminis
                        - N. terrigena
                      - - N. piscis
                        - - N. allogilvus
                          - N. currus
                    - - N. gansuensis
                      - - N. seonyuensis
                        - - - N. okcheonensis
                            - N. palaemonis
                          - - - N. hwasunensis
                              - - N. exalbidus
                                - N. oleivorans
                            - - - N. renjunii Zhou et al. 2024
                                - - - N. cavernae
                                    - - N. pini
                                      - N. pinisoli
                                  - - N. flavus
                                    - - N. eburneiflavus
                                      - N. ganghwensis
                              - - - - N. furvisabuli
                                    - N. lacusdianchii
                                  - - - "N. astragali" Xu et al. 2018
                                      - - N. alpinus
                                        - N. zhouii
                                    - - N. potassii
                                      - - N. baculatus
                                        - N. glacieisoli
              - - - - - N. flavescens
                      - - N. anomalus
                        - N. halotolerans
                    - - - N. psychrotolerans
                        - - N. lijunqiniae
                          - N. szechwanensis
                      - - - N. aquaticus
                          - N. nanhaiensis
                        - - N. marinquilinus
                          - - N. dongxiaopingii
                            - - N. litoris
                              - - N. plantarum
                                - N. rubriscoriae
                  - - N. ferulae Liu et al. 2019
                    - - - N. kribbensis
                        - - - N. dongkuii
                            - N. lianchengensis
                          - - - N. ochotonae
                              - N. pantholopis
                            - - - N. abyssi
                                - N. deserti
                              - - N. marmotae
                                - N. oceani
                      - - - - N. ginsengisegetis
                            - N. luti
                          - - N. panaciterrulae
                            - - N. koreensis
                              - N. ungokensis
                        - - - N. conyzicola
                            - N. endophyticus
                          - - - N. aquiterrae
                              - N. caricicola
                            - - N. mangrovi
                              - - N. agri Huq et al. 2024
                                - N. soli
                - - - - N. marinus
                      - - N. acrostichi
                        - "N. bruguierae" Chen et al. 2023
                    - - N. dokdonensis
                      - - N. marinisabuli
                        - - N. cremeus
                          - N. salarius
                  - - N. fonticola
                    - - - N. insulae
                        - - - - N. panacihumi
                              - N. terrae
                            - - N. baekrokdamisoli Lee et al. 2016
                              - N. nematodiphilus
                          - - N. albertanoniae
                            - - N. luteus
                              - - "N. turkmenicus" Saygin et al. 2024
                                - - N. albus
                                  - N. panzhihuensis
                      - - - - N. panacisoli
                            - N. thalensis
                          - - - N. humilatus
                              - N. stalactiti
                            - - N. silvaticus
                              - - "N. antri" Lee et al. 2021
                                - - N. bizhenqiangii Zhou et al. 2024
                                  - - N. immobilis
                                    - N. pelophilus
                        - - N. sambongensis
                          - - N. faecalis
                            - - N. caeni
                              - - N. aromaticivorans
                                - - - N. ginsengisoli
                                    - N. simplex
                                  - - - "N. carbamazepini" Benedek et al. 2022
                                      - N. humi
                                    - - N. albidus
                                      - - N. daeguensis
                                        - - N. kongjuensis
                                          - N. nitrophenolicus

Unassigned species:

- "N. aquaegermanicae" Zhou et al. 2026
- "Ca. N. delftensis" Rubio-Rincón et al. 2019
- "N. epinepheli" Li et al. 2025
- "N. flava" Singh and Yin 2016 non Ruan & Zhang 1979 non Wang, Zhou & Zhang 2016
- "N. flavus" Ruan & Zhang 1979 non Singh and Yin 2016 non Wang, Zhou & Zhang 2016
- "N. ginsengiglaebae" Yoon, Ten & Im 2007b
- N. lacus Nam et al. 2025
- "N. maritimus" Lee & Lee 2008
- "N. panaciterrae"
- "N. paucivorans" Ahn et al. 2014
- "N. polaris" Tan et al. 2026
- N. proteolyticus Liu et al. 2025
- N. secundeburneus Kim et al. 2025
- "N. suum" Lee et al. 2017
- "N. terrisoli" Lee, Chaudhary & Kim 2024
- N. ureilyticus Liu et al. 2025
- "N. xinjiangensis" Mo et al. 2024

== See also ==
- List of bacterial orders
- List of bacteria genera
