= Nocardioides perillae =

Scientific classification
- Domain: Bacteria
- Kingdom: Bacillati
- Phylum: Actinomycetota
- Class: Actinomycetia
- Order: Propionibacteriales
- Family: Nocardioidaceae
- Genus: Nocardioides
- Species: N. perillae

Binomial name
- Nocardioides perillae Du et al. 2013

Type strain
- CPCC 203382; DSM 24552; I10A-01402; KCTC 29022

Species of bacterium

Nocardioides perillae is a Gram-positive and rod-shaped bacterium from the genus Nocardioides which has been isolated from the roots of the plant Perilla frutescens from a suburb of Beijing, China. Nocardioides perillae produces the menaquinone MK-8(H4).
