= Mumia (disambiguation) =

Mumia most commonly refers to Mumia Abu-Jamal (born 1954), imprisoned political activist known for his conviction in the murder of Daniel Faulkner.

Mumia may also refer to:

- Mummia, either a substance used in the embalming of mummies, or a powder made from ground mummies
- Nabongo Mumia (c.1852–1949), leader of the Wanga Kingdom of Kenya
- Mumia (bacterium), a genus of bacteria

== See also ==
- Mumias, a town in Kakamega County, Kenya
