= Nocardioides kongjuensis =

Scientific classification
- Domain: Bacteria
- Kingdom: Bacillati
- Phylum: Actinomycetota
- Class: Actinomycetia
- Order: Propionibacteriales
- Family: Nocardioidaceae
- Genus: Nocardioides
- Species: N. kongjuensis

Binomial name
- Nocardioides kongjuensis Yoon et al. 2006

Type strain
- A2-4; BCRC 16836; CCRC 16836; CIP 109335; DSM 19082; JCM 12609; KCTC 19054

Species of bacterium

Nocardioides kongjuensis is a Gram-positive bacterium from the genus Nocardioides which has been isolated from soil from Gongju, South Korea. Nocardioides kongjuensis has the ability to degrade N-acyl homoserine lactone.
