= Flindersiella endophytica =

Scientific classification
- Domain: Bacteria
- Kingdom: Bacillati
- Phylum: Actinomycetota
- Class: Actinomycetia
- Order: Propionibacteriales
- Family: Actinopolymorphaceae
- Genus: Flindersiella; Kaewkla and Franco 2011
- Species: F. endophytica

Binomial name
- Flindersiella endophytica Kaewkla and Franco 2011

Type strain
- ACM 5289; DSM 45355; EUM 378

Species of bacterium

Flindersiella endophytica is an endophytic bacterium from the genus Flindersiella which has been isolated from the tree Eucalyptus microcarpa in Adelaide in Australia.
