= Methyl acetate hydrolase =

Type of hydrolase enzyme

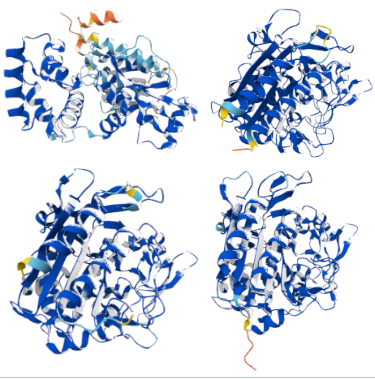
- Collage of methyl acetate hydrolases from various bacterium, from clockwise: Gordonia sp., Nocardioides perillae, Rhodospira trueperi, Calidifontibacter indicus.

Identifiers
- EC no.: 3.1.1.114

Databases
- BRENDA: enzyme data
- ExPASy: NiceZyme view
- KEGG: enzyme entry
- MetaCyc: metabolic pathway
- Rhea: reactions
- PDB structures: RCSB PDB PDBe PDBsum
Search
- PMC: articles
- PubMed: articles
- NCBI: proteins

Methyl acetate hydrolase, known also as methylacetate acetohydrolase is a hydrolase enzyme that uses water to carry out the hydrolysis of methyl acetate (CH_{3}COOCH_{3}), a weakly lipophillic and polar compound often used as a solvent. In the species Gordonia sp. (strain TY-5), the enzyme is encoded by gene acMB. The enzyme catalyzes the following reaction,

methyl acetate + water = methanol + acetic acid

The enzyme is involved in two major pathways, the butanoate metabolism pathway and the catabolic degradation pathway of propanol.
