= Aeromicrobium =

Scientific classification
- Domain: Bacteria
- Kingdom: Bacillati
- Phylum: Actinomycetota
- Class: Actinomycetes
- Order: Propionibacteriales
- Family: Nocardioidaceae
- Genus: Aeromicrobium; Miller, Woese & Brenner 1991

Type species
- Aeromicrobium erythreum Miller, Woese & Brenner 1991

Species
- See text

Genus of bacteria

Aeromicrobium is a Gram-positive, aerobic, non-spore-forming and non-motile bacterial genus from the family Nocardioidaceae.

== Phylogeny ==
The currently accepted taxonomy is based on the List of Prokaryotic names with Standing in Nomenclature (LPSN) and National Center for Biotechnology Information (NCBI).

16S rRNA based LTP_10_2024

- Aeromicrobium
  - A. massiliense
  - - - A. piscarium
      - - A. camelliae
        - A. phragmitis
    - - - - A. choanae
          - A. duanguangcaii
        - - A. tamlense
          - - A. flavum
            - A. senzhongii
      - - - A. halocynthiae
          - - A. lacus Sun et al. 2019
            - - - A. panacisoli Siddiqi et al. 2019
                - A. terrae
              - - A. erythreum
                - A. ponti Lee and Lee 2008
        - - A. alkaliterrae
          - - A. panaciterrae
            - - A. marinum
              - - - A. chenweiae
                  - A. yanjiei
                - - A. ginsengisoli
                  - - A. wangtongii
                    - - A. stalagmiti
                      - - A. endophyticum
                        - A. fastidiosum

120 marker proteins based GTDB 10-RS226

- Aeromicrobium
  - - A. panaciterrae Cui et al. 2007
    - - A. ginsengisoli Kim et al. 2008
      - - - A. wangtongii Ye et al. 2023
          - - A. endophyticum Tuo et al. 2020
            - A. fastidiosum (Collins and Stackebrandt 1989) Tamura and Yokota 1994
        - - A. stalagmiti Byeon et al. 2022
          - - A. chenweiae Li et al. 2020
            - A. yanjiei Li et al. 2020
  - - - A. alkaliterrae Yoon et al. 2005
      - - A. marinum Bruns et al. 2003
        - - A. terrae Lin et al. 2021
          - - A. terrae Lin et al. 2021
            - A. halocynthiae Kim et al. 2010
    - - A. massiliense Ramasamy et al. 2014
      - - - A. piscarium Zhao et al. 2020
          - - A. camelliae Niu et al. 2015
            - A. phragmitis Li et al. 2021
        - - - A. flavum Tang et al. 2008
            - - A. duanguangcaii Ye et al. 2023
              - A. senzhongii Ye et al. 2023
          - - A. tamlense Lee and Kim 2007
            - - A. choanae Ber et al. 2017
              - "A. phoceense" Boxberger et al. 2020

Species incertae sedis:

- "A. halotolerans" Yan et al. 2016
- "A. kazakhstani" Strap et al. 2007
- "A. kwangyangensis" Kim, Baik &Seong 2007c

== See also ==
- List of bacterial orders
- List of bacteria genera
