= Thermasporomyces composti =

Scientific classification
- Domain: Bacteria
- Kingdom: Bacillati
- Phylum: Actinomycetota
- Class: Actinomycetia
- Order: Propionibacteriales
- Family: Actinopolymorphaceae
- Genus: Thermasporomyces; Yabe et al. 2011
- Species: T. composti

Binomial name
- Thermasporomyces composti Yabe et al. 2011

Type strain
- DSM 22891; I3; JCM 16421

Species of bacterium

Thermasporomyces composti is a Gram-positive and thermophilic bacterium from the genus Thermasporomyces which has been isolated from compost on Japan.
