= Kongjuensis =

Kongjuensis may refer to:

- Nocardioides kongjuensis, species of bacteria
- Pseudonocardia kongjuensis, species of bacteria
