= Kribbella sancticallisti =

Scientific classification
- Domain: Bacteria
- Kingdom: Bacillati
- Phylum: Actinomycetota
- Class: Actinomycetia
- Order: Propionibacteriales
- Family: Kribbellaceae
- Genus: Kribbella
- Species: K. sancticallisti

Binomial name
- Kribbella sancticallisti Urzì et al. 2008

Type strain
- BC633; DSM 19602; JCM 14969

Species of bacterium

Kribbella sancticallisti is a species of bacteria in the genus Kribbella. It was discovered as a whitish-grey patina growing in Roman catacombs in 2008.

== See also ==
- Kribbella catacumbae
- Rubrobacter—found in catacombs (see Catacombs#Bacteria)
