= Kribbella catacumbae =

Scientific classification
- Domain: Bacteria
- Kingdom: Bacillati
- Phylum: Actinomycetota
- Class: Actinomycetia
- Order: Propionibacteriales
- Family: Kribbellaceae
- Genus: Kribbella
- Species: K. catacumbae

Binomial name
- Kribbella catacumbae Urzì et al. 2008

Type strain
- BC631; DSM 19601; JCM 14968

Species of bacterium

Kribbella catacumbae is a species of bacteria in the genus Kribbella. It was discovered on the walls of Roman catacombs in 2008.

== See also ==
- Kribbella sancticallisti
- Rubrobacter - found in catacombs (see Catacombs#Bacteria)
