= Actinopolymorpha =

Scientific classification
- Domain: Bacteria
- Kingdom: Bacillati
- Phylum: Actinomycetota
- Class: Actinomycetes
- Order: Propionibacteriales
- Family: Actinopolymorphaceae
- Genus: Actinopolymorpha; Wang et al. 2001

Type species
- Actinopolymorpha singaporensis Wang et al. 2001

Species
- A. alba; A. cephalotaxi; A. pittospori; A. rutila; A. singaporensis

Genus of bacteria

Actinopolymorpha is a genus in the phylum Actinomycetota (Bacteria).

== Etymology ==
The name Actinopolymorpha derives from:
Greek noun aktis, aktinos (ἀκτίς, ἀκτῖνος); Greek adjective polumorphos, multiform, manifold; Neo-Latin feminine gender noun (Neo-Latin feminine gender adjective used as a substantive) Actinopolymorpha, actinomycete of many shapes.

- A. alba Cao et al. 2009 (Latin feminine gender adjective alba, white, referring to the white substrate mycelium.)
- A. cephalotaxi Yuan et al. 2010 (Neo-Latin genitive case noun cephalotaxi, of Cephalotaxus, isolated from Cephalotaxus fortunei from which the rhizosphere soil sample was collected.)
- A. pittospori Kaewkla and Franco 2011
- A. rutila Wang et al. 2008 (Latin feminine gender adjective rutila, red inclining to golden-yellow, referring to the colour of colonies produced.)
- A. singaporensis Wang et al. 2001 (Neo-Latin feminine gender adjective singaporensis, of or belonging to Singapore, signifying the country where the type strain was isolated.)

== Phylogeny ==
The currently accepted taxonomy is based on the List of Prokaryotic names with Standing in Nomenclature (LPSN) and National Center for Biotechnology Information (NCBI).

16S rRNA based LTP_10_2024

- Actinopolymorpha
  - A. alba
  - - A. pittospori
    - - A. cephalotaxi
      - - A. rutila
        - A. singaporensis

120 marker proteins based GTDB 10-RS226

- Actinopolymorpha
  - A. alba Cao et al. 2009
  - - A. pittospori Kaewkla and Franco 2011
    - - A. singaporensis Wang et al. 2001
      - - A. cephalotaxi Yuan et al. 2010
        - A. rutila Wang et al. 2008

== See also ==
- List of bacterial orders
- List of bacteria genera
