= Mumia (bacterium) =

Scientific classification
- Domain: Bacteria
- Kingdom: Bacillati
- Phylum: Actinomycetota
- Class: Actinomycetes
- Order: Propionibacteriales
- Family: Nocardioidaceae
- Genus: Mumia; Lee et al. 2014

Type species
- Mumia flava Lee et al. 2014

Species
- M. flava; M. quercus; M. qirimensis; M. spirodelae; M. xiangluensis; M. zhuanghuii

Genus of bacteria

Mumia is a bacterial genus from the family Nocardioidaceae.

== Phylogeny ==
The currently accepted taxonomy is based on the List of Prokaryotic names with Standing in Nomenclature (LPSN) and National Center for Biotechnology Information (NCBI).

16S rRNA based LTP_10_2024

- Mumia
  - - M. quercus Chen et al. 2023
    - M. zhuanghuii Tian et al. 2020
  - - M. flava Lee et al. 2014
    - M. xiangluensis Zhou et al. 2016

120 marker proteins based GTDB 10-RS226

- Mumia
  - M. flava
  - - M. quercus
    - M. xiangluensis [incl. M. zhuanghuii]

== See also ==
- List of bacterial orders
- List of bacteria genera
