= Kribbella =

Scientific classification
- Domain: Bacteria
- Kingdom: Bacillati
- Phylum: Actinomycetota
- Class: Actinomycetes
- Order: Propionibacteriales
- Family: Kribbellaceae; Nouioui et al. 2018
- Genus: Kribbella; Park et al. 1999

Type species
- Kribbella flavida Park et al. 1999

Species
- See text

Synonyms
- Hongia Lee, Kang & Hah 2000

Genus of bacteria

Kribbella is a genus of bacteria first discovered in 1999.

== Phylogeny ==
The currently accepted taxonomy is based on the List of Prokaryotic names with Standing in Nomenclature (LPSN) and National Center for Biotechnology Information (NCBI).

16S rRNA based LTP_10_2024

- Kribbella
  - K. deserti Sun et al. 2017
  - - - K. amoyensis
      - - - K. italica
          - K. lupini
        - - K. flavida
          - L. sancticallisti
    - - - K. karoonensis
        - - K. mirabilis Li et al. 2015
          - - K. soli
            - - K. shirazensis
              - - - K. hippodromi
                  - K. solani
                - - - K. podocarpi Curtis et al. 2018
                    - K. speibonae
                  - - K. jiaozuonensis
                    - - K. aluminosa
                      - - K. jejuensis
                        - K. sindirgiensis
      - - - K. capetownensis
          - K. pittospori
        - - - K. swartbergensis Kirby et al. 2006
            - K. turkmenica
          - - - K. alba
              - K. monticola
            - - - K. ginsengisoli Cui et al. 2010
                - K. koreensis
              - - - K. catacumbae
                  - - K. endophytica Kaewkla and Franco 2013
                    - K. qitaiheensis
                - - K. antibiotica
                  - - K. sandramycini
                    - - K. albertanoniae
                      - K. yunnanensis

120 marker proteins based GTDB 10-RS226

- Kribbella
  - - K. alba Li et al. 2006
    - - - K. qitaiheensis Guo et al. 2018
        - - K. monticola Song et al. 2018
          - "K. voronezhensis" Avtukh, Ariskina & Baryshnikova 2023
      - - "K. orskensis" Avtukh, Ariskina & Baryshnikova 2023
        - - L. sancticallisti Urzì et al. 2008
          - - K. catacumbae Urzì et al. 2008
            - K. koreensis (Lee et al. 2000) Sohn et al. 2003
  - - - K. flavida Park et al. 1999
      - - K. italica Everest et al. 2015
        - K. lupini Trujillo et al. 2006
    - - K. amoyensis Xu et al. 2012
      - - - "K. antiqua" Avtukh, Ariskina & Baryshnikova 2023
          - - "K. steppae" Avtukh, Ariskina & Baryshnikova 2023
            - K. turkmenica Saygin et al. 2019
        - - - K. sandramycini Park et al. 1999
            - - K. yunnanensis Li et al. 2006
              - - K. albertanoniae Everest et al. 2013
                - K. antibiotica Li et al. 2004
          - - - K. capetownensis Curtis et al. 2020
              - K. pittospori Kaewkla and Franco 2016
            - - - "K. kalugense" Avtukh, Ariskina & Baryshnikova 2023
                - - K. jiaozuonensis Zhao et al. 2019
                  - "K. rubisoli" Avtukh, Ariskina & Baryshnikova 2023
              - - - K. hippodromi Everest and Meyers 2008
                  - K. solani Song et al. 2004
                - - - K. sindirgiensis Ozdemir-Kocak et al. 2018 [incl. K. speibonae Curtis et al. 2020]
                    - - "K. pratensis" Avtukh, Ariskina & Baryshnikova 2023
                      - K. soli Ozdemir-Kocak et al. 2017
                  - - K. shirazensis Mohammadipanah et al. 2013
                    - - K. jejuensis Song et al. 2004
                      - - K. aluminosa Carlsohn et al. 2007
                        - K. karoonensis Kirby et al. 2006

Species incertae sedis:

- "K. caucasensis" Avtukh et al. 2024

== See also ==
- List of bacterial orders
- List of bacteria genera
