= Actinopolymorphaceae =

Scientific classification
- Domain: Bacteria
- Kingdom: Bacillati
- Phylum: Actinomycetota
- Class: Actinomycetes
- Order: Propionibacteriales
- Family: Actinopolymorphaceae; Nouioui et al. 2018

Type genus
- Actinopolymorpha Wang et al. 2001

Genera
- Actinopolymorpha; Flindersiella; Tenggerimyces; Thermasporomyces

Family of bacteria

Actinopolymorphaceae is a family of bacteria.

== Phylogeny ==
The currently accepted taxonomy is based on the List of Prokaryotic names with Standing in Nomenclature (LPSN) and National Center for Biotechnology Information (NCBI).

16S rRNA based LTP_08_2023

- - - Flindersiella Kaewkla and Franco 2011
    - Tenggerimyces Sun et al. 2015
  - - Thermasporomyces Yabe et al. 2011
    - Actinopolymorpha Wang et al. 2001

120 marker proteins based GTDB 10-RS226

- - Tenggerimyces
  - - Thermasporomyces
    - Actinopolymorpha

== See also ==
- List of bacterial orders
- List of bacteria genera
