= Catacombs =

Subterranean passageways used as burial place

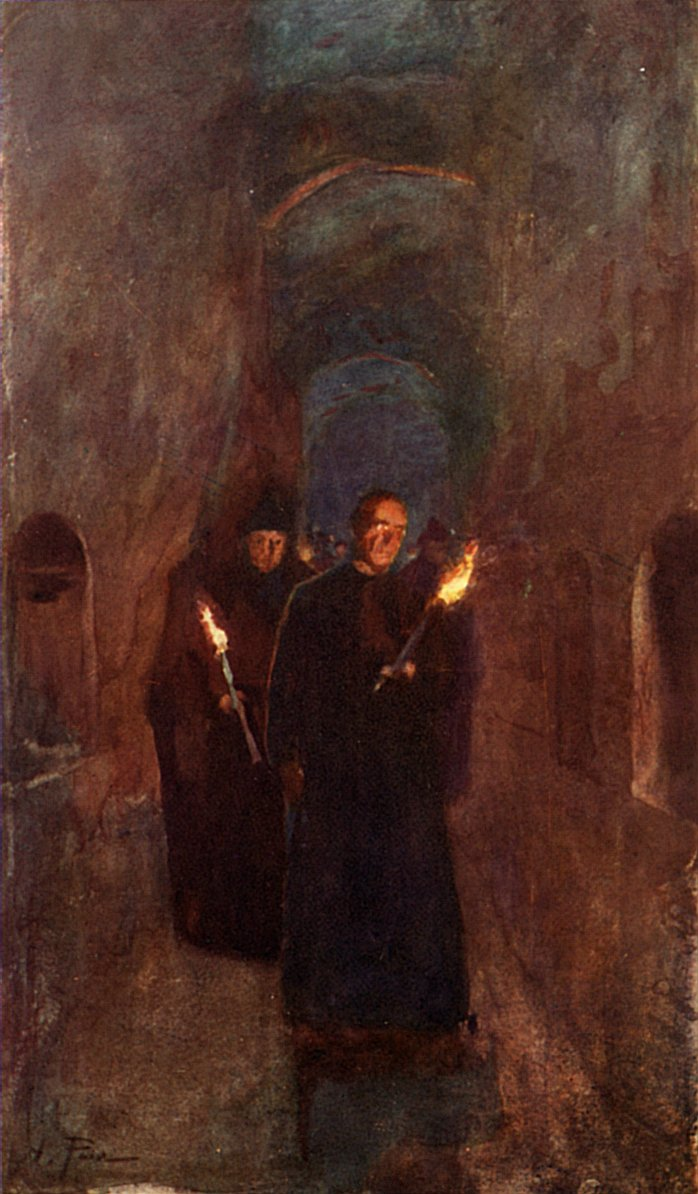
A procession in the San Callistus catacombs in Rome, painted by Alberto Pisa

Catacombs are man-made underground passages primarily used for religious purposes, particularly for burial. Any chamber used as a burial place is considered a catacomb, although the word is most commonly associated with the Roman Empire.

== Etymology and history ==
The first place to be referred to as catacombs was the system of underground tombs between the 2nd and 3rd milestones of the Appian Way in Rome, where the bodies of the apostles Peter and Paul, among others, were said to have been buried. The name of that place in Late Latin was catacumbae (feminine nominative plural; the singular is catacumba) — a word of obscure origin, possibly deriving from a proper name or a derivation of the Latin cata tumbas "at the graves". The word referred originally only to the Roman catacombs, but was extended by the 19th century to refer to any subterranean receptacle of the dead, as in the 18th-century Paris catacombs. The ancient Christians carved the first catacombs from soft tufa rock.

All Roman catacombs were located outside city walls since it was illegal to bury a dead body within the city, providing "a place…where martyrs' tombs could be openly marked" and commemorative services and feasts held safely on sacred days.

== Around the world ==
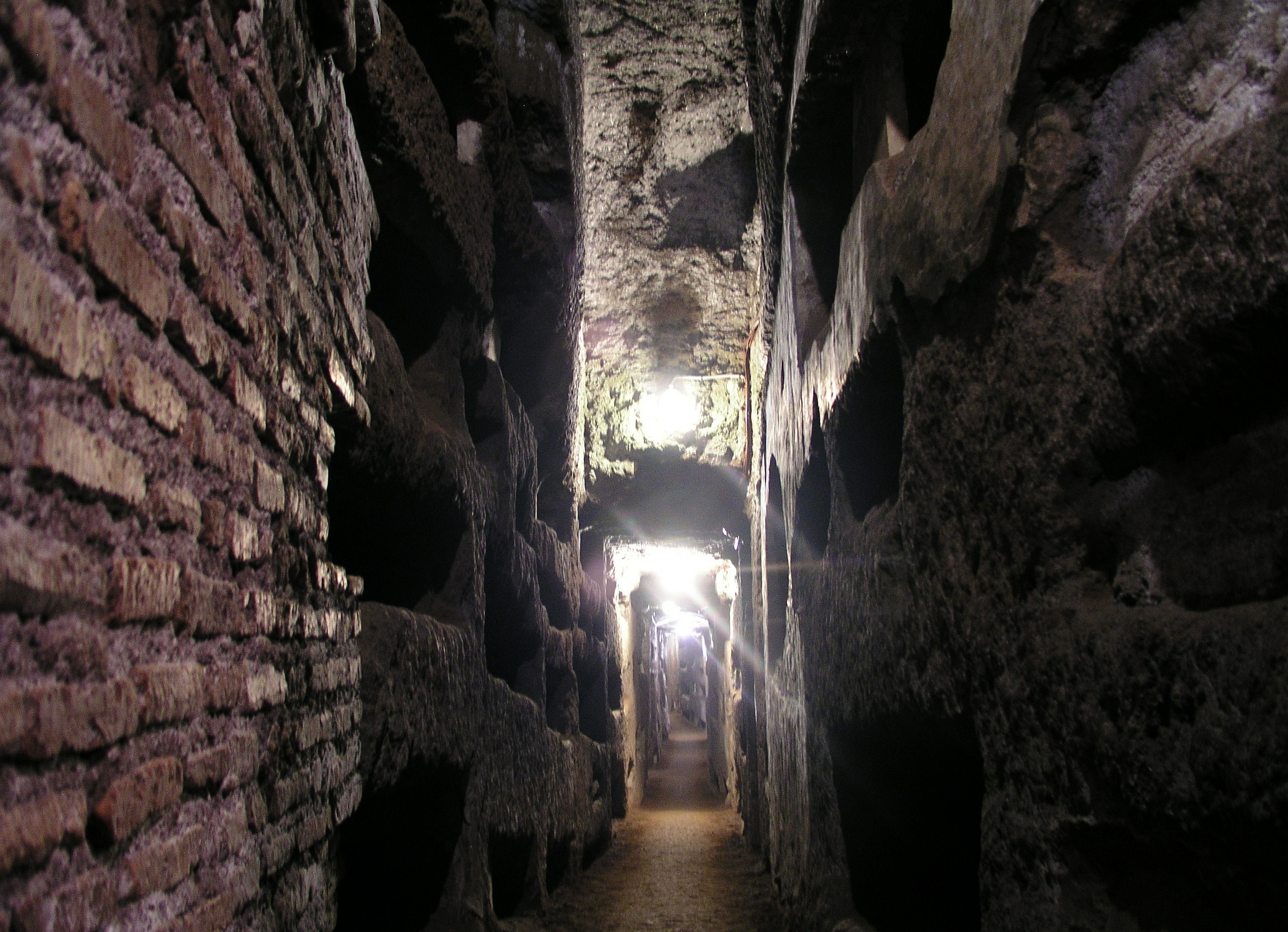
Grave niches in the Catacombs of Domitilla, Rome

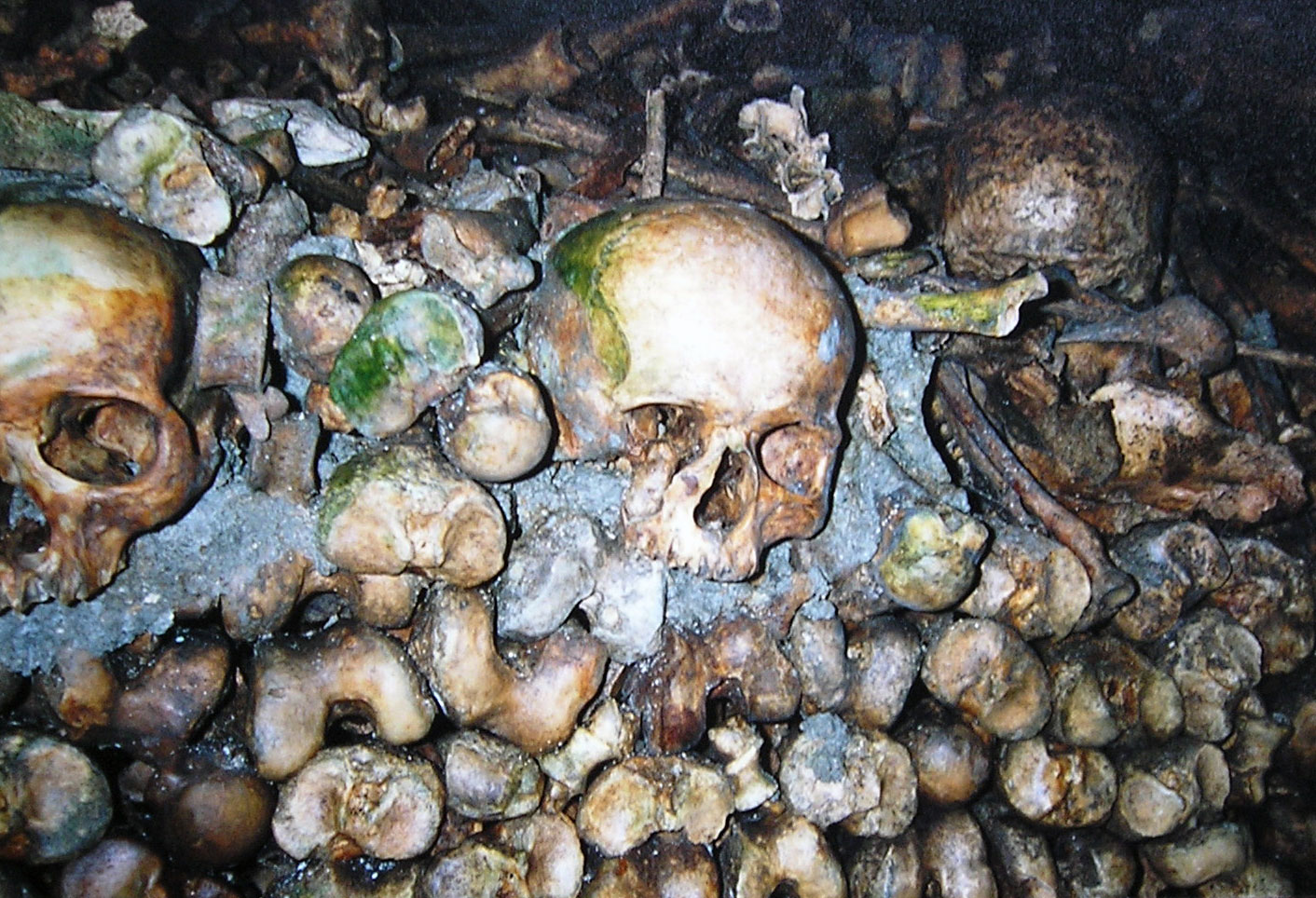
Paris Catacombs

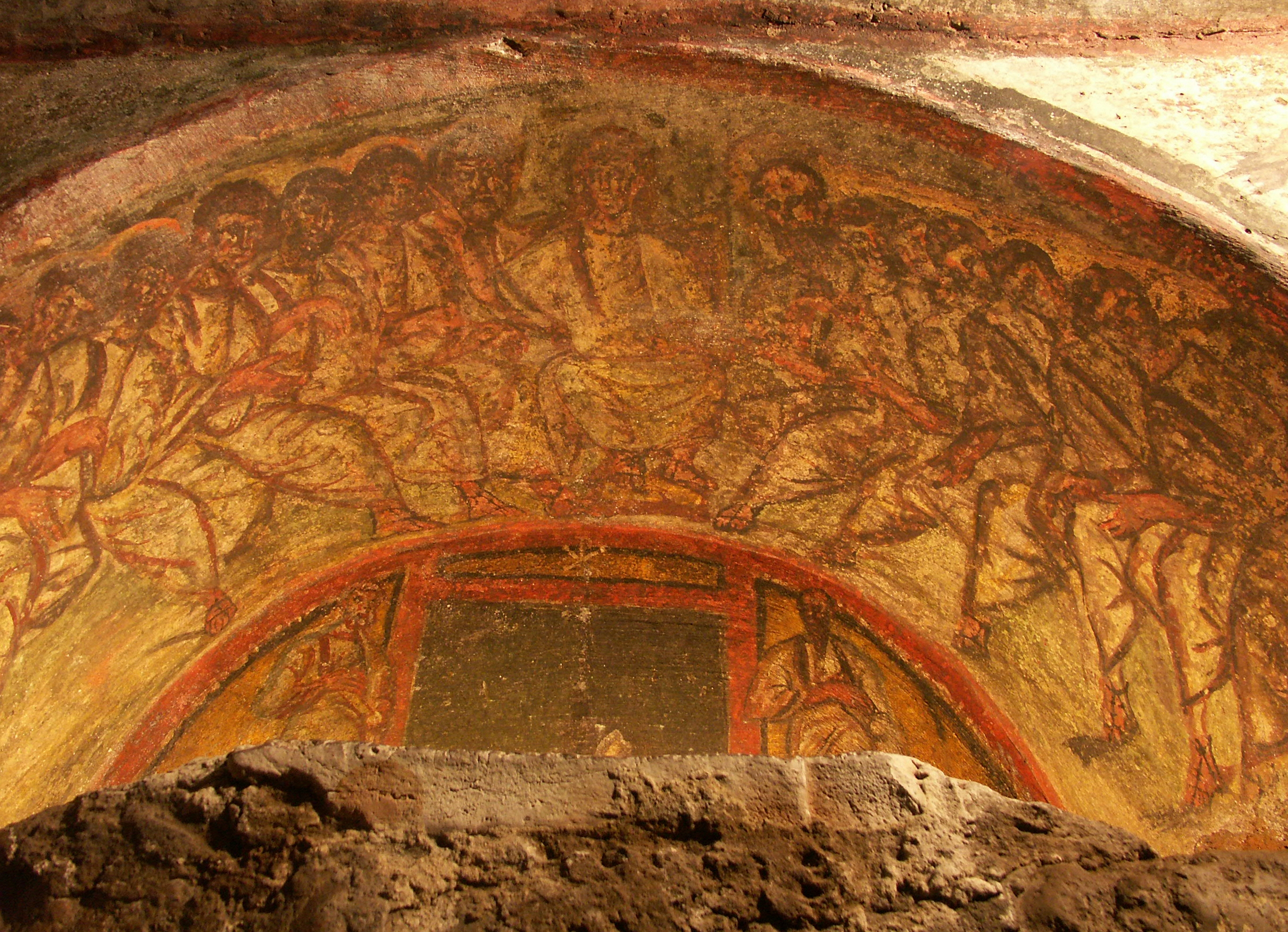
Jesus and his twelve apostles, fresco with the Chi-Rho symbol ☧, Catacombs of Domitilla, Rome

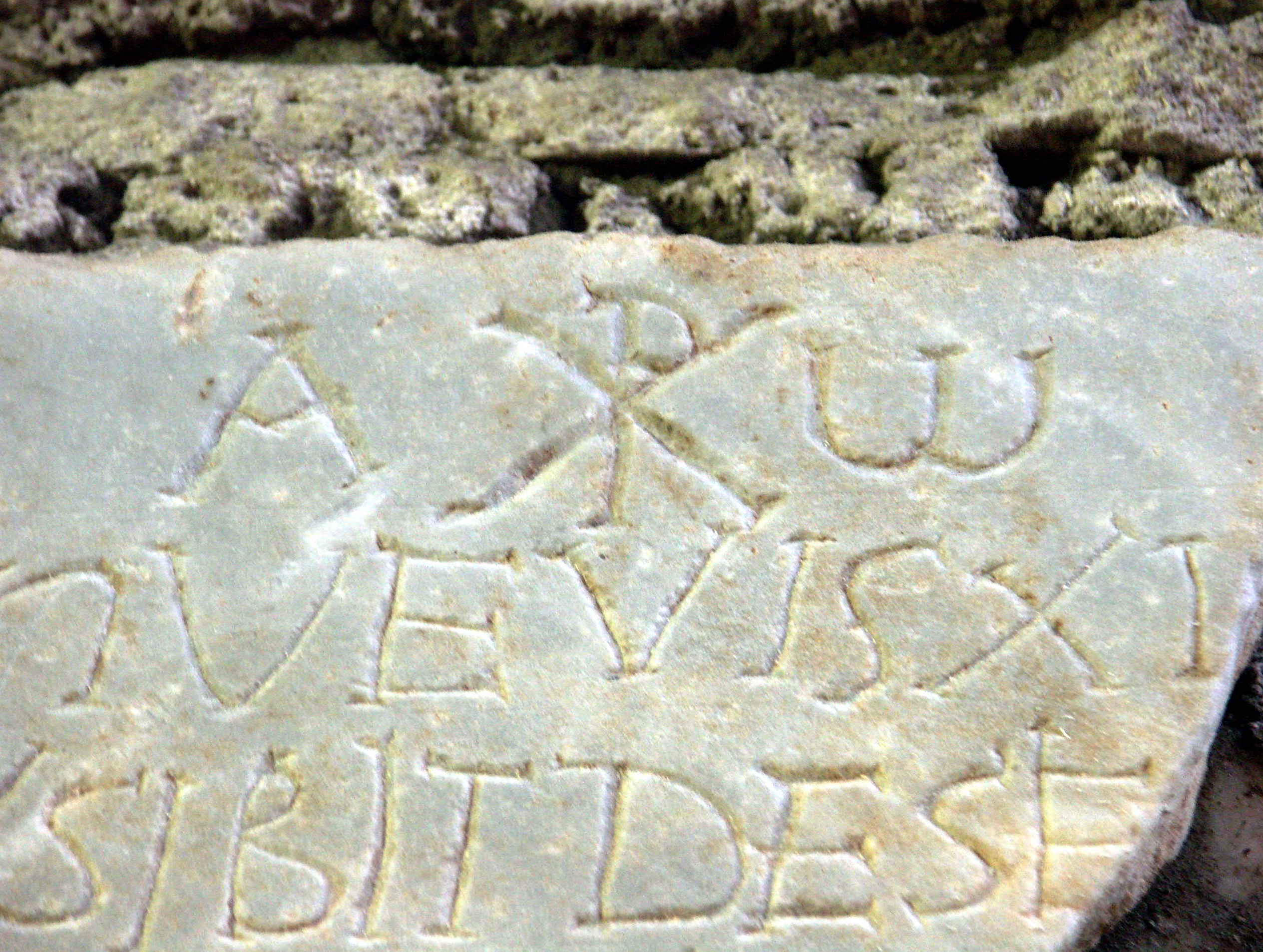
The Chi-Rho symbol ☧ with Alpha and Omega, Catacombs of Domitilla, Rome

Catacombs around the world include:

- Austria – Catacombs of St. Stephen's Cathedral, Vienna
- Czech Republic – Catacombs of Znojmo
- Bosnia and Herzegovina – Catacombs of Jajce
- Egypt – Catacombs of Kom el Shoqafa (or Kom al Sukkfa, Shuqafa, etc.) in Alexandria
- United Kingdom – Catacombs of London and others
- Finland – Catacombs of the Helsinki Orthodox cemetery at Hietaniemi cemetery
- France – Catacombs of Paris. Mine workings were used at end of the 18th century and had no religious purpose other than as an ossuary for storing the bones of cleared graveyards.
- Greece – Catacombs of Milos
- Italy – Catacombs of Rome; Catacombs of Naples; Capuchin catacombs of Palermo, Catacombs of Syracuse and others
- Israel – Beit She'arim necropolis
- Malta – Catacombs of Malta
- Peru – Catacombs of Lima
- Philippines – Catacomb of Nagcarlan Underground Cemetery
- Spain – Catacombs of Sacromonte in Granada
- Serbia – Petrovaradin Fortress catacombs
- Tunisia – Catacombs of Sousse
- Ukraine – Odesa Catacombs
- United States – Old St. Patrick's Cathedral

There are also catacomb-like burial chambers in Anatolia, Turkey; in Sousse, Tunisia; in Syracuse, Italy; Trier, Germany; Kyiv, Ukraine. Capuchin catacombs of Palermo, Sicily, were used as late as the 1920s. Catacombs were available in some of the grander English cemeteries founded in the 19th century, such as Sheffield General Cemetery (above ground) and West Norwood Cemetery (below ground). There are catacombs in Bulgaria near Aladzha Monastery and in Romania as medieval underground galleries in Bucharest. In Ukraine and Russia, catacomb (used in the local languages' plural katakomby) also refers to the network of abandoned caves and tunnels earlier used to mine stone, especially limestone.

In Italy, possible Catacombs are also located in Alezio, beside the Sanctuary of Santa Maria dell'Assunta, as well as the basement of Santa Maria della Lizza Sanctuary.

== Decorations ==
Catacombs, although most notable as underground passageways and cemeteries, also house many decorations. There are thousands of decorations in the centuries-old catacombs of Rome, Paris, and other sites, some of which include inscriptions, paintings, statues, ornaments, and other items placed in the graves over the years.

Most of these decorations were used to identify, immortalize and show respect for the dead. The catacombs of Rome were primarily decorated with images and words exalting Christ or depicting scenes from the Old and New Testaments of the Bible. Much of the sculpture work and art, other than engravings on the walls or tombs, has been preserved in places such as the Museum of Saint John Lateran, Christian Museum of Berlin University, and the Vatican.

Three representations of Christ as Orpheus charming animals with peaceful music have been found in the catacombs of Domatilla and St. Callista. Another figure was made of gilded glass and dates back to the fourth century, featuring Jesus with the world balanced in his hand and a scroll at his feet.

=== Inscriptions ===
Although thousands of inscriptions were lost as time passed, many of those remaining indicate the social rank or job title of its inhabitants; however, most of the inscriptions simply indicate how loving a couple was, or the love of parents and such. A common and particularly interesting one found in Roman catacombs is the Ichthys, or "Monogram of Christ" which reads ΙΧΘΥΣ, standing for "Jesus Christ, Son of God, Savior".

== Bacteria ==
In recent years unique strains of bacteria have been discovered that thrive in catacombs, inducing mineral efflorescence and decay. These include Kribbella sancticallisti, Kribbella catacumbae, and three types of non-thermophilic (low-temperature) Rubrobacter.

== See also ==
- Cemetery
- Crypt
- Ossuary
- "The Cask of Amontillado"
- Underground city
- Necropolis
