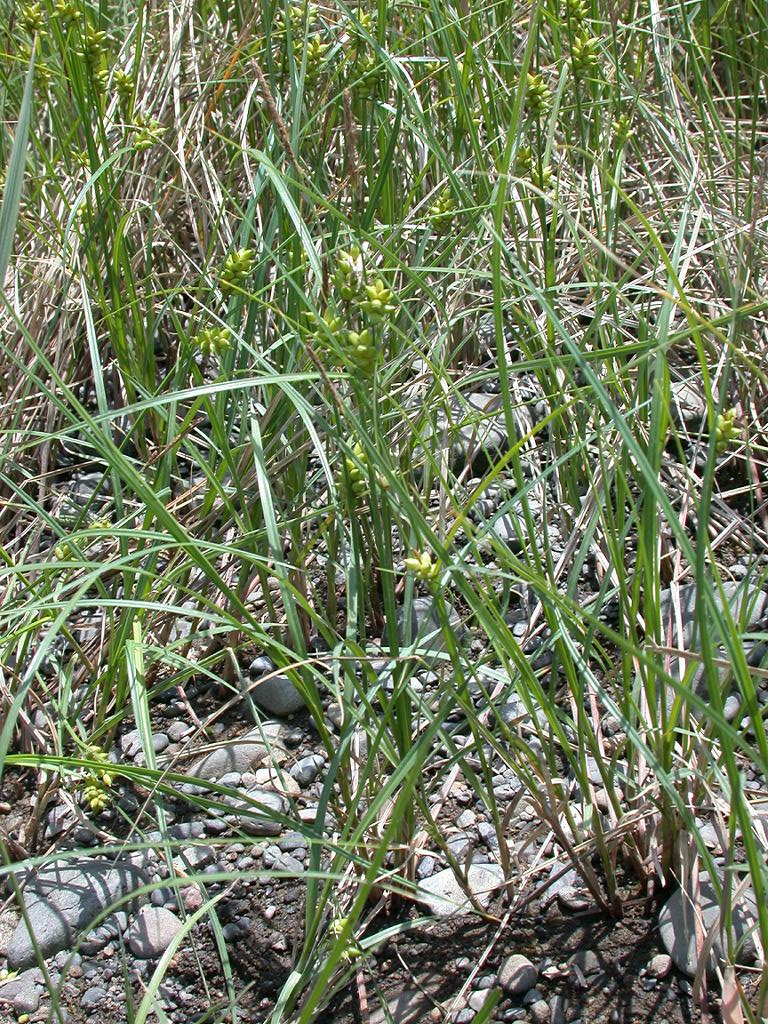

Scientific classification
- Kingdom: Plantae
- Clade: Tracheophytes
- Clade: Angiosperms
- Clade: Monocots
- Clade: Commelinids
- Order: Poales
- Family: Cyperaceae
- Genus: Carex
- Species: C. scabrifolia

Binomial name
- Carex scabrifolia Steud.

= Carex scabrifolia =

Species of plant

Carex scabrifolia, also known as cao ye tai cao, is a tussock-forming species of perennial sedge in the family Cyperaceae. It is native to eastern parts of Asia.

== Description ==
The sedge has a rhizome that runs parallel to the ground sprouting new tufts. It has two or three thin culms with a triangular cross-section that grow to a height of 30 to 60 cm (12 to 24 in). The culms are mostly smooth but have a rough texture on the upper portion. The culms are surrounded by bladeless sheaths with a red-brown colour near the base that deteriorate over time into a mass of fibers.

== Taxonomy ==
The species was first described by the botanist Ernst Gottlieb von Steudel in 1855 as a part of the work Synopsis Plantarum Glumacearum. It has four synonyms; Carex pierotii described by Friedrich Anton Wilhelm Miquel in 1865, Carex suberea described by Boott in 1867, Carex malinvaldii and Carex yabei.

== Distribution ==
C. scabrifolia is found in temperate biomes in eastern Asia from north central China in the west through Korea to Japan in the east. It is found as far north as Primorye and south to Taiwan.

== See also ==
- List of Carex species
