= Bigeumdo =

Island in South Jeolla Province, South Korea

- Interactive map of Bigeumdo

Geography
- Location: Yellow Sea
- Coordinates: 34.7615°N 125.9288°E
- Area: 45.25 km^{2} (17.47 sq mi)
- Coastline: 64.1 km (39.83 mi)

Administration
- South Korea
- Provincial-level city: Jeonnam-Gwangju
- County: Sinan County

Bigeumdo (Korean: 비금도; Hanja: 飛禽島) is an island in Bigeum-myeon, Sinan County, Jeonnam-Gwangju, South Korea. In July 2022, it had a population of 3,484 people in 1,935 households.

It has an area of 45.25 km^{2} (17.47 mi^{2}) and coastline of 64.1 km (39.8 mi).

Sculptor Antony Gormley visited the island in 2022 with plans to install a piece of art there in the future.
