= Nocardioidaceae =

Scientific classification
- Domain: Bacteria
- Kingdom: Bacillati
- Phylum: Actinomycetota
- Class: Actinomycetes
- Order: Propionibacteriales
- Family: Nocardioidaceae; Nesterenko et al. 1990

Genera
- Aeromicrobium; Marmoricola; Mumia; Solicola; Nocardioides

Family of bacteria

Nocardioidaceae is a family of Gram-positive bacteria within the class Actinomycetia.

== Phylogeny ==
The currently accepted taxonomy is based on the List of Prokaryotic names with Standing in Nomenclature (LPSN) and National Center for Biotechnology Information (NCBI).

16S rRNA based LTP_10_2024

- Nocardioidaceae
  - - Mumia Lee et al. 2014
    - Aeromicrobium Miller et al. 1991
  - - Solicola Lopez Marin et al. 2023
    - - Nocardioides~
      - - - Nocardioides~
          - Marmoricola Urzì et al. 2000
        - Nocardioides Prauser 1976

120 marker proteins based GTDB 10-RS226

- Nocardioidaceae
  - - Solicola
    - - Mumia
      - Aeromicrobium
  - - - Marmoricola_A
      - Nocardioides_B, C
    - - Marmoricola
      - - Nocardioides_A
        - Nocardioides

== See also ==
- List of bacterial orders
- List of bacteria genera
