= Propionibacteriales =

Scientific classification
- Domain: Bacteria
- Kingdom: Bacillati
- Phylum: Actinomycetota
- Class: Actinomycetes
- Order: Propionibacteriales (Rainey et al. 1997) Patrick and McDowell 2015

Families
- Actinopolymorphaceae; Kribbellaceae; Nocardioidaceae; Propionibacteriaceae

Synonyms
- Propionibacteriineae corrig. Rainey et al. 1997

Order of bacteria

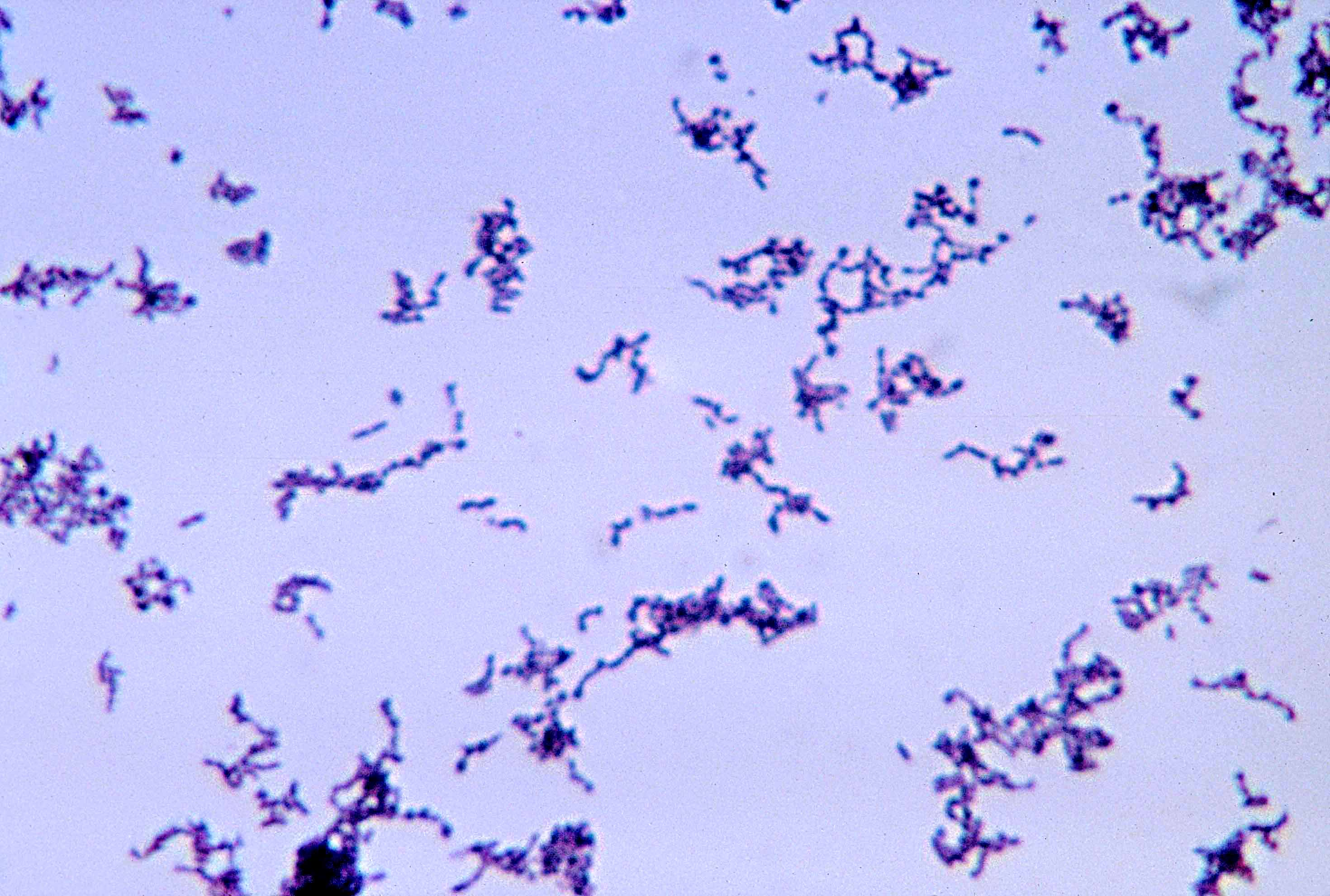
Cutibacterium acnes, a bacterium present on the skin of most healthy humans, is a member of the order Propionibacteriales.

The Propionibacteriales are an order of bacteria.

== Phylogeny ==
The currently accepted taxonomy is based on the List of Prokaryotic names with Standing in Nomenclature (LPSN) and National Center for Biotechnology Information (NCBI).

Whole-genome analysis

- - Actinopolymorphaceae Nouioui et al. 2018
  - - Kribbellaceae Nouioui et al. 2018
    - - Propionibacteriaceae Delwiche 1957
      - Nocardioidaceae Nesterenko et al. 1990

16S rRNA based LTP_10_2024

- - Actinopolymorphaceae
  - - Propionibacteriaceae
    - - Kribbellaceae
      - Nocardioidaceae

120 marker proteins based GTDB 10-RS226

- - Actinopolymorphaceae
  - - - Kribbellaceae
      - Propionibacteriaceae
    - Nocardioidaceae

== See also ==
- List of bacterial orders
- List of bacteria genera
