= Small non-coding RNAs in Sinorhizobium meliloti =

Within genetics, post-genomic research has rendered bacterial small non-coding RNAs (sRNAs) as major players in post-transcriptional regulation of gene expression in response to environmental stimuli. The Alphaproteobacteria includes Gram-negative microorganisms with diverse life styles; frequently involving long-term interactions with higher eukaryotes.

== Sinorhizobium meliloti ==
Sinorhizobium meliloti is an agronomically relevant α-proteobacterium able to induce the formation of new specialized organs, the so-called nodules, in the roots of its cognate legume hosts (i.e. some Medicago species). Within the nodule cells bacteria undergo a morphology differentiation to bacteroid, their endosymbiotic nitrogen-fixing competent form. Rhizobial adaptations to soil and plant cell environments require the coordinate expression of complex gene networks in which sRNAs are expected to participate.

== Discovery ==
Two complementary computational screens, eQRNA and RNAz, were used to search for novel sRNA-encoding genes in the intergenic regions IGRs of S. meliloti. Verification of eQRNA/RNAz predictions by Northern hybridization and RACE mapping led to the identification of eight previously unknown genes, with recognizable promoter and termination signatures, expressing small transcripts. These new genomic loci were referred to as smr, for S. meliloti RNA. Seven of the Smr transcripts, which conservation is restricted to phylogenetically related Alphaproteobacteria, accumulated differentially in free-living and endosymbiotic bacteria. These findings anticipate a function for these sRNAs as trans-acting antisense riboregulators of Alphaproteobacteria-eukaryote interactions.

sRNA families summary
sRNA	Family name	Alternative names	Accession number	5’-end	3’-end	Predicted length (nt)	Flanking genes	Sequence	Target strand
Smr7C	αr7	Sra03/Sm13/SmelC023	AM939557	201679	201828	150/106	polA/SMc02851	5'-ACCAGATGAGGACAAAGGCCTCATC-3'	<
Smr7C	αr7	Sra03/Sm13/SmelC023	AM939557	201679	201828	150/106	polA/SMc02851	5'-GATGAGGCCTTTGTCCTCATCTGGT-3'	>
Smr9C	αr9	Sra32/Sm10/SmelC289	AM939558	1398425	1398277	149	SMc01933/proS	5'-CGCGTGATCTTTAATCCGTTTCCGG-3'	<
Smr9C	αr9	Sra32/Sm10/SmelC289	AM939558	1398425	1398277	149	SMc01933/proS	5'-CCGGAAACGGATTAAAGATCACGCG-3'	>
Smr14C2	αr14	Sm7/SmelC397	AM939559	1667613	1667491	123	SMc02051/tig	5'-TGCTTGATCTGATTGGCAACCGGGA-3'	<
Smr14C2	αr14	Sm7/SmelC397	AM939559	1667613	1667491	123	SMc02051/tig	5'-TCCCGGTTGCCAATCAGATCAAGCA-3'	>
Smr15C1	αr15	Sra41/Sm3/SmelC411	AM939560	1698731	1698617	115	SMc01226/SMc01225	5'-GAGGAGAAAGCCGCTAGATGCACCA-3'	<
Smr15C1	αr15	Sra41/Sm3/SmelC411	AM939560	1698731	1698617	115	SMc01226/SMc01225	5'-TGGTGCATCTAGCGGCTTTCTCCTC-3'	>
Smr15C2	αr15	Sra41/Sm3’/SmelC412	AM939561	1698817	1698937	121	SMc01226/SMc01225	5'-ACTGGGAGGAGAAGCCACCAAAGAT-3'	<
Smr15C2	αr15	Sra41/Sm3’/SmelC412	AM939561	1698817	1698937	121	SMc01226/SMc01225	5'-ATCTTTGGTGGCTTCTCCTCCCAGT-3'	>
Smr22C	αr22	Sra56/Sm1/SmelC667/6S	AM939564	2972251	2972091	161	SMc03975/SMc03976	5'-TACTAGGTAGGTGGGCACCGTATGC-3'	<
Smr22C	αr22	Sra56/Sm1/SmelC667/6S	AM939564	2972251	2972091	161	SMc03975/SMc03976	5'-GCATACGGTGCCCACCTACCTAGTA-3'	>
Smr35B	αr35	SmB6/SmelC053	AM939563	577730	577868	139	SMb20551/SMb20552	5'-TGGTAAGCGATGATGAGGAAGGTCG-3'	<
Smr35B	αr35	SmB6/SmelC053	AM939563	577730	577868	139	SMb20551/SMb20552	5'-CGACCTTCCTCATCATCGCTTACCA-3'	>
Smr45C	αr45	SmelC706	AM939562	3105445	3105265	181	SMc02983/SMc02984	5'-CCGCACCGTCGTTGCTTCAAGATGT-3'	<
Smr45C	αr45	SmelC706	AM939562	3105445	3105265	181	SMc02983/SMc02984	5'-ACATCTTGAAGCAACGACGGTGCGG-3'	>
