= JASPAR =

Database of biological data

Content
- Description: an open-access database of transcription factor binding profiles
- Data types captured: Eukaryotic transcription factors, their binding sites and binding profiles
- Organisms: eukaryotes

Contact
- Authors: Sandelin, A
- Primary citation: Sandelin, A. et al. (2004)
- Release date: 2004

Access
- Website: http://jaspar.genereg.net/

JASPAR is an open access and widely used database of manually curated, non-redundant transcription factor (TF) binding profiles stored as position frequency matrices (PFM) and transcription factor flexible models (TFFM) for TFs from species in six taxonomic groups. From the supplied PFMs, users may generate position-specific weight matrices (PWM). The JASPAR database was introduced in 2004. There were seven major updates and new releases in 2006, 2008, 2010, 2014, 2016, 2018, 2020 and 2022, which is the latest release of JASPAR..

== Availability ==
The JASPAR database is an open-source and freely available for scientific community at http://jaspar.genereg.net/.

== Similar databases ==
- TRANSFAC – Transcription Factor Database
- HOCOMOCO - HOmo sapiens COmprehensive MOdel COllection
- PAZAR - Database with focus on experimentally validated transcription factor binding sites
- TFe – the transcription factor encyclopedia
- AnimalTFDB – Animal transcription factor database
- PlantCARE – cis-regulatory elements and transcription factors in plants (2002)
- RegTransBase - transcription factor binding sites in a diverse set of bacteria.
- RegulonDB – Primary database on transcriptional regulation in Escherichia coli
- TRRD – Transcription Regulatory Regions Database, mainly about regulatory regions and TF-binding sites
- PlantRegMap Plant Transcriptional Regulatory Map
- MethMotif An integrative database of cell-specific transcription factor binding site motifs coupled with DNA methylation profiles.
