= Fabio Rinaldi =

Research scientist

Fabio Rinaldi is head of NLP research at IDSIA, Switzerland. He earned his PhD in Computational Linguistics from the University of Zurich, Switzerland in 2008. He continued to work at the University of Zurich as a lecturer, senior researcher and group leader until 2020.

Currently, Rinaldi is the leader of the NLP group at the Dalle Molle Institute for Artificial Intelligence (Lugano, Switzerland). He is also a group leader at the Swiss Institute of Bioinformatics (SIB), and a visiting fellow at the Fondazione Bruno Kessler.

From 2015 to 2019 he was a visiting scientist at the Center for Genomic Sciences (UNAM, Mexico), where he collaborated with the RegulonDB group.

He is the initiator and team leader of the (former) OntoGene research group, which focuses on Text Mining for biomedical applications.

Rinaldi is an active contributor to the field of biomedical text mining.

== Publications ==
Selected publications include:

1. Furrer, L.; Jancso, A.; Colic, N.; Rinaldi, F. (2019). "OGER++: Hybrid multi-type entity recognition". Journal of Cheminformatics. 11 (1): 7. doi:10.1186/s13321-018-0326-3. PMC 6689863. PMID 30666476.
2. Kanjirangat, V.; Rinaldi, F. (2021). "Enhancing Biomedical Relation Extraction with Transformer Models using Shortest Dependency Path Features and Triplet Information". Journal of Biomedical Informatics. 122 103893. doi:10.1016/j.jbi.2021.103893. PMID 34481058. S2CID 237417517.
3. Zanoli, R.; Lavelli, A.; Löffler, T.; Perez Gonzalez, N. A.; Rinaldi, F. (2022). "An annotated dataset for extracting gene-melanoma relations from scientific literature". Journal of Biomedical Semantics. 13 (1): 2. doi:10.1186/s13326-021-00251-3. PMC 8772125. PMID 35045882.
4. Furrer, L.; Cornelius, J.; Rinaldi, F. (2022). "Parallel sequence tagging for concept recognition". BMC Bioinformatics. 22 (Suppl 1): 623. doi:10.1186/s12859-021-04511-y. PMC 8943923. PMID 35331131.
5. Kanjirangat, V.; Samardzic, T.; Dolamic, L.; Rinaldi, F. (2025). "Tokenization and Representation Biases in Multilingual Models on Dialectal NLP Tasks". Proceedings of the 2025 Conference on Empirical Methods in Natural Language Processing (EMNLP 2025). arXiv:2509.20045.
