= Αr9 RNA =

αr9 is a family of bacterial small non-coding RNAs with representatives in a broad group of α-proteobacteria from the order Hyphomicrobiales. The first member of this family (Smr9C) was found in a Sinorhizobium meliloti 1021 locus located in the chromosome (C). Further homology and structure conservation analysis have identified full-length Smr9C homologs in several nitrogen-fixing symbiotic rhizobia (i.e. R. leguminosarum bv.viciae, R. leguminosarum bv. trifolii, R. etli, and several Mesorhizobium species), in the plant pathogens belonging to Agrobacterium species (i.e. A. tumefaciens, A. vitis, A. radiobacter, and Agrobacterium H13) as well as in a broad spectrum of Brucella species (B. ovis, B. canis, B. abortus and B. microtis, and several biovars of B. melitensis). αr9C RNA species are 144-158 nt long (Table 1) and share a well defined common secondary structure consisting of seven conserved regions (Figure 1). Most of the αr9 transcripts can be catalogued as trans-acting sRNAs expressed from well-defined promoter regions of independent transcription units within intergenic regions (IGRs) of the α-proteobacterial genomes (Figure 5).

== Discovery and structure ==
Smr9C sRNA was described by del Val et al. in the intergenic regions (IGRs) of the reference S. meliloti 1021 strain (http://iant.toulouse.inra.fr/bacteria/annotation/cgi/rhime.cgi). Northern hybridization experiments confirmed that the predicted smr9C locus did express a single transcript of the expected size, which accumulated differentially in free-living and endosymbiotic bacteria. TAP-based 5'-RACE experiments mapped the transcription start site (TSS) of the full-length Smr9C transcript to the 1,398,425 nt position in the S. meliloti 1021 genome (http://iant.toulouse.inra.fr/bacteria/annotation/cgi/rhime.cgi) whereas the 3'-end was assumed to be located at the 1,398,277 nt position matching the last residue of the consecutive stretch of Us of a bona fide Rho-independent terminator (Figure 5). Parallel and later studies in which Smr9C transcript is referred to as Igr#3 or sra32 independently confirmed the expression this sRNA in S. meliloti and in its closely related strain 2011. Recent deep sequencing-based characterization of the small RNA fraction (50-350 nt) of S. meliloti 2011 further confirmed the expression of Smr9C (here referred to as SmelC289), and mapped the 5'- and 3'-ends of the full-length transcript to positions 1,398,423 and 1,398,279, respectively, in the S. meliloti 1021 genome.

The nucleotide sequence of Smr9C was initially used as query to search against the Rfam database (version 10.0; http://www.sanger.ac.uk/Software/Rfam). This homology search rendered no matches to known bacterial sRNA in this database. Smr9C was next BLASTed with default parameters against all the currently available bacterial genomes (1,615 sequences at 20 April 2011; https://www.ncbi.nlm.nih.gov). The regions exhibiting significant homology to the query sequence (78-89% similarity) were extracted to create a Covariance Model (CM) from a seed alignment using Infernal (version1.0) (Figure 2). This CM was used in a further search for new members of the αr9 family in the existing bacterial genomic databases.

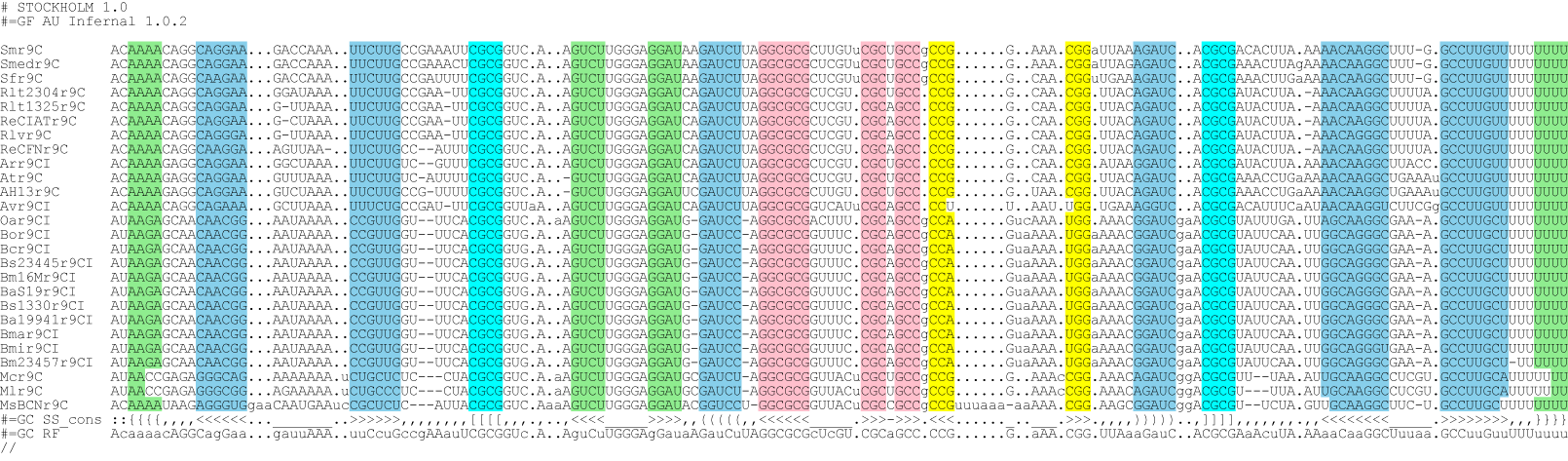
Figure 1: Covariance Model in stockholm format showing the consensus structure for the αr9 family. Each of the stems represented by the structure line#=GC SS_cons is in a different color. To download the covariance model click here.

The results were manually inspected to deduce a consensus secondary structure for the family (Figure 1 and Figure 2). The consensus structure was also independently predicted with the program locARNATE with very similar predictions. The manual inspection of the sequences found with the CM using Infernal allowed finding 26 true homolog sequences, all of them present as single chromosomal copies in the α-proteobacterial genomes. The rhizobial species encoding the 12 closer homologs to Smr9C were: two R. leguminosarum trifolii strains (WSM2304 and WSM1235), two R. etli strains CFN 42 and CIAT 652, the reference R. leguminosarum bv. viciae 3841 strain, Rhizobium NGR234, and the Agrobacterium species A. vitis,A. tumefaciens, A. radiobacter and A. H13. All these sequences showed significant Infernal E-values (1.50e-39 – 14.02e-21) and bit-scores. The rest of the sequences found with the model showed high E-values between (3.40e-12 and 2.62e-04) but lower bit-scores and are encoded by Brucella species (B. ovis, B. canis, B. abortus, B. microtis, and several biobars of B. melitensis), Brucella anthropi and the Mesorhizobum species M. loti, M. ciceri and M. BNC.

Table 1: Smr9C homologs in other symbionts and pathogens
CM model	Name	GI accession number	begin	end	strand	%GC	length	Organism
αr9	Smr9C	gi|15963753|ref|NC_003047.1|	1398277	1398425	-	46	149	Sinorhizobium meliloti 1021
αr9	Smedr9C	gi|150395228|ref|NC_009636.1|	979747	979902	-	48	150	Sinorhizobium medicae WSM419 chromosome
αr9	Sfr9C	gi|227820587|ref|NC_012587.1|	1130001	1130150	-	47	150	Sinorhizobium fredii NGR234 chromosome
αr9	Atr9C	gi|159184118|ref|NC_003062.2|	1275297	1275443	-	47	147	Agrobacterium tumefaciens str. C58 chromosome circular
αr9	AH13r9C	gi|325291453|ref|NC_015183.1|	1215580	1215726	-	48	147	Agrobacterium sp. H13-3 chromosome
αr9	ReCIATr9C	gi|190889639|ref|NC_010994.1|	1684929	1685072	-	48	144	Rhizobium etli CIAT 652
αr9	Arr9CI	gi|222084201|ref|NC_011985.1|	1481975	1482119	-	49	145	Agrobacterium radiobacter K84 chromosome 1
αr9	Rlt2304r9C	gi|209547612|ref|NC_011369.1|	1296506	1296650	-	48	145	Rhizobium leguminosarum bv. trifolii WSM2304 chromosome
αr9	Avr9CI	gi|222147015|ref|NC_011989.1|	1448510	1448659	-	45	150	Agrobacterium vitis S4 chromosome 1
αr9	Rlvr9C	gi|116249766|ref|NC_008380.1|	1802936	1803079	-	49	144	Rhizobium leguminosarum bv. viciae 3841
αr9	Rlt1325r9C	gi|241202755|ref|NC_012850.1|	1354593	1354736	-	47	144	Rhizobium leguminosarum bv. trifolii WSM1325
αr9	ReCFNr9C	gi|86355669|ref|NC_007761.1|	1703203	1703345	-	47	143	Rhizobium etli CFN 42
αr9	Mlr9C	gi|57165207|ref|NC_002678.2|	1127217	1127363	+	54	145	Mesorhizobium loti MAFF303099 chromosome
αr9	Mcr9C	gi|319779749|ref|NC_014923.1|	3449639	3449786	-	52	148	Mesorhizobium ciceri biovar biserrulae WSM1271 chromosome
αr9	Bcr9CI	gi|161617991|ref|NC_010103.1|	796281	796428	-	49	148	Brucella canis ATCC 23365 chromosome I
αr9	Bs23445r9CI	gi|163842277|ref|NC_010169.1|	817762	817909	-	49	148	Brucella suis ATCC 23445 chromosome I
αr9	Bm16Mr9CI	gi|17986284|ref|NC_003317.1|	1187596	1187743	+	49	146	Brucella melitensis bv. 1 str. 16M chromosome I
αr9	BaS19r9CI	gi|189023268|ref|NC_010742.1|	817898	818045	-	49	148	Brucella abortus S19 chromosome 1
αr9	Bm23457r9CI	gi|225851546|ref|NC_012441.1|	819377	819523	-	50	147	Brucella melitensis ATCC 23457 chromosome I
αr9	Bs1330r9CI	gi|56968325|ref|NC_004310.3|	797917	798064	-	49	148	Brucella suis 1330 chromosome I
αr9	Ba19941r9CI	gi|62288991|ref|NC_006932.1|	819597	819744	-	49	148	Brucella abortus bv. 1 str. 9-941 chromosome I
αr9	Bmar9CI	gi|82698932|ref|NC_007618.1|	815875	816022	-	49	148	Brucella melitensis biovar Abortus 2308 chromosome I
αr9	Bor9CI	gi|148558820|ref|NC_009505.1|	822712	822859	-	49	148	Brucella ovis ATCC 25840 chromosome I
αr9	Bmir9CI	gi|256368465|ref|NC_013119.1|	802078	802225	-	49	148	Brucella microti CCM 4915 chromosome 1
αr9	Oar9CI	gi|153007346|ref|NC_009667.1|	2529108	2529255	+	48	146	Brucella anthropi ATCC 49188 chromosome 1
αr9	MsBCNr9C	gi|110632362|ref|NC_008254.1|	1141776	1141933	-	50	158	Mesorhizobium sp. BNC1

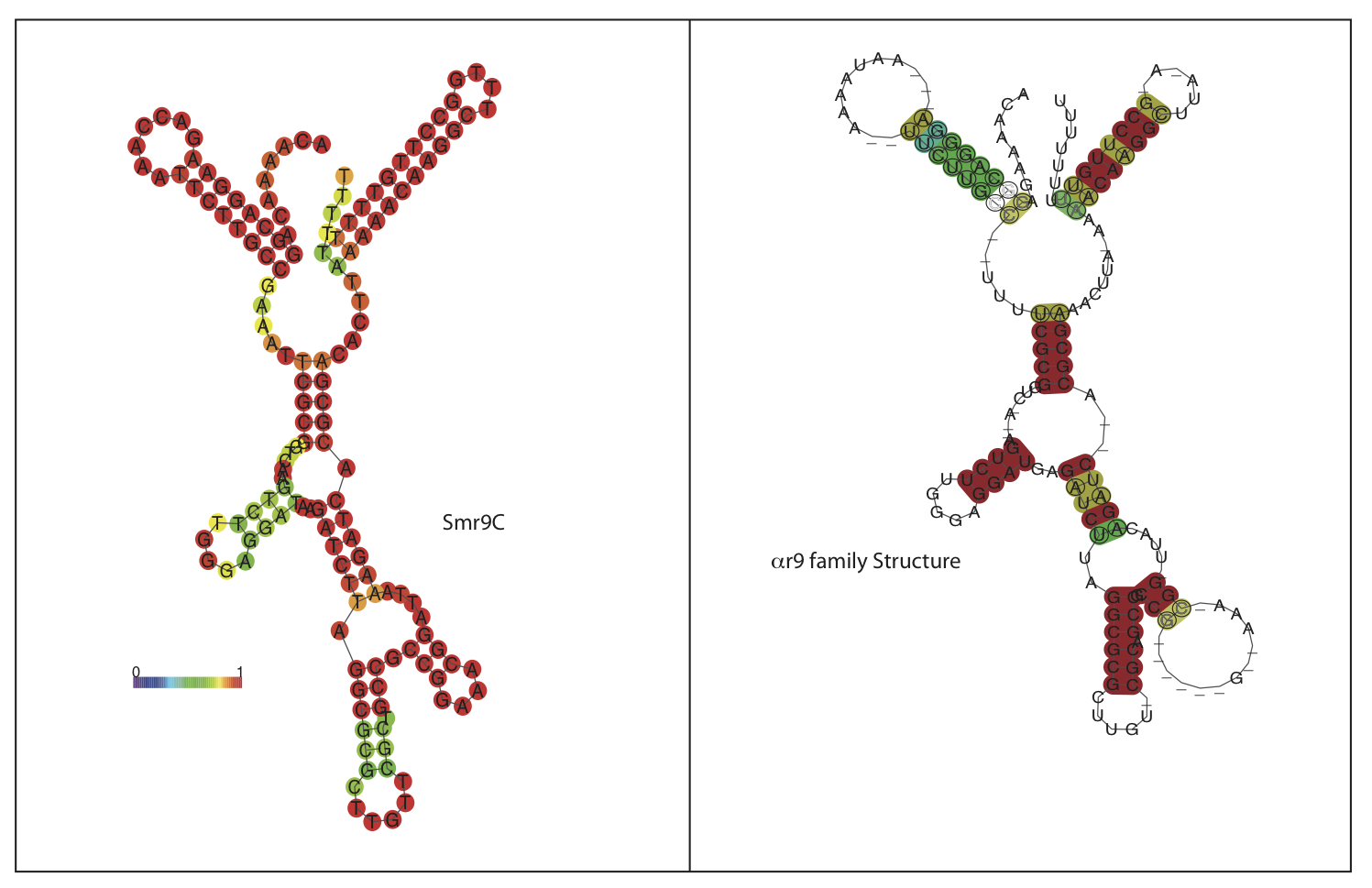
Figure 2: Consensus secondary structure of the αr9 members predicted by RNA and RNAalifold. Smr9C is coloured according to base pair probabilities, the color probability scale is indicated in the drawing. The αr9 family structure is coloured following a base conservation scheme. Red: base pair occurring in all sequences used to generate the consensus; yellow: two types of base pairing occur; Green: three types of base pairing occur. The shading of base pairs represents: Saturated, no inconsistent sequences; Pale, one inconsistent sequence; Very pale, two inconsistent sequences.

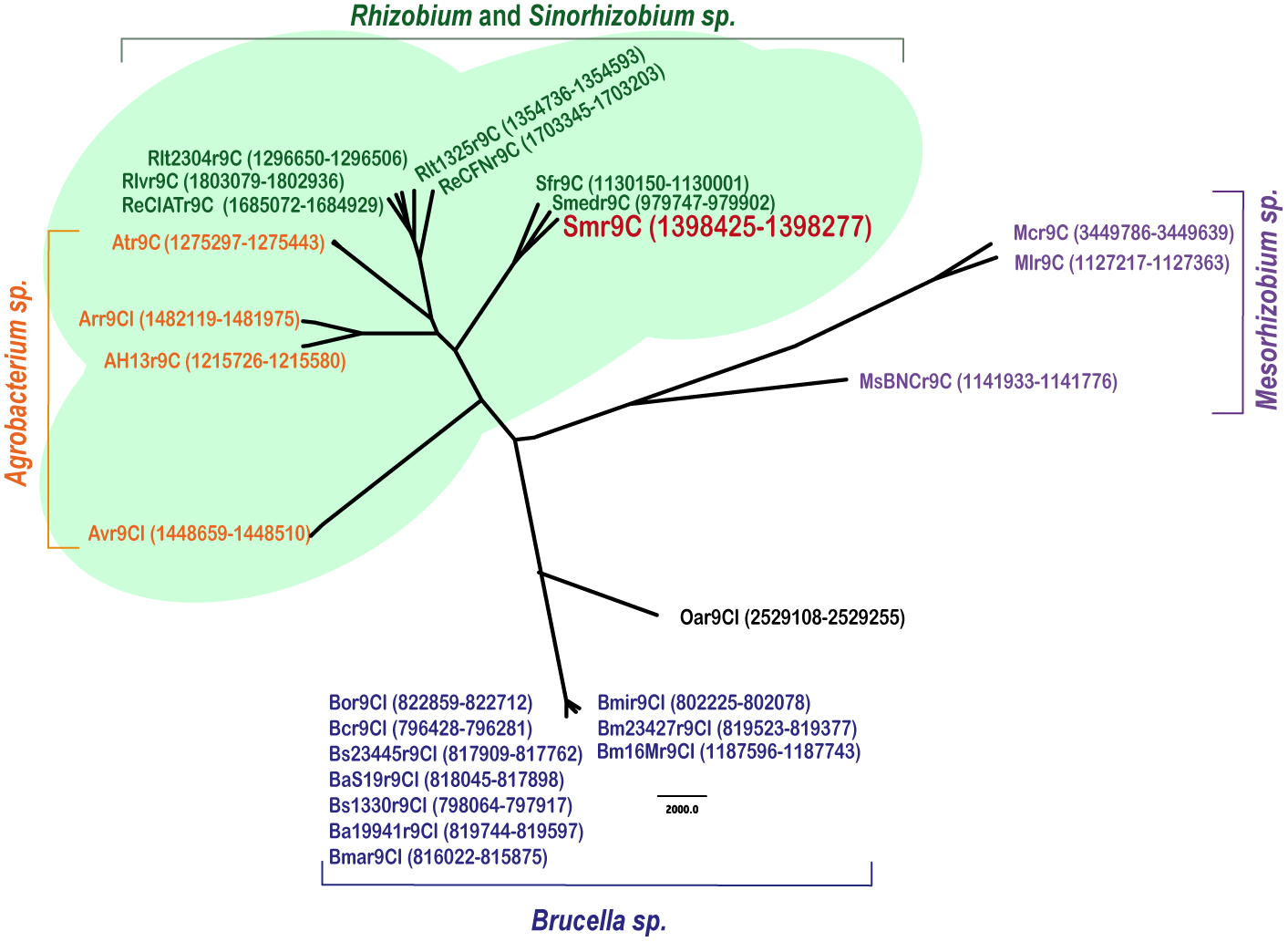
Figure 3: Phylogenetic distribution of known and predicted αr9 genes. Gene numbers are based on computational analysis using the program Infernal. Legend: Smr9C = Sinorhizobium meliloti 1021 (NC_003047), Smedr9C = Sinorhizobium medicae WSM419 chromosome (NC_009636), Sfr9C = Sinorhizobium fredii NGR234 chromosome (NC_012587), Atr9C = Agrobacterium tumefaciens str. C58 chromosome circular (NC_003062), AH13r9C = Agrobacterium sp. H13-3 chromosome (NC_015183), ReCIATr9C = Rhizobium etli CIAT 652 (NC_010994), Arr9CI = Agrobacterium radiobacter K84 chromosome 1 (NC_011985), Rlt2304r9C = Rhizobium leguminosarum bv. trifolii WSM2304 chromosome (NC_011369), Avr9CI = Agrobacterium vitis S4 chromosome 1 (NC_011989), Rlvr9C = Rhizobium leguminosarum bv. viciae 3841 (NC_008380), Rlt1325r9C = Rhizobium leguminosarum bv. trifolii WSM1325 (NC_012850), ReCFNr9C = Rhizobium etli CFN 42 (NC_007761), Mlr9C = Mesorhizobium loti MAFF303099 chromosome (NC_002678), Mcr9C = Mesorhizobium ciceri biovar biserrulae WSM1271 chromosome (NC_014923), Bcr9CI = Brucella canis ATCC 23365 chromosome I (NC_010103), Bs23445r9CI = Brucella suis ATCC 23445 chromosome I (NC_010169), Bm16Mr9CI = Brucella melitensis bv. 1 str. 16M chromosome I (NC_003317), BaS19r9CI = Brucella abortus S19 chromosome 1 (NC_010742), Bm23457r9CI = Brucella melitensis ATCC 23457 chromosome I (NC_012441), Bs1330r9CI = Brucella suis 1330 chromosome I (NC_004310), Ba19941r9CI = Brucella abortus bv. 1 str. 9-941 chromosome I (NC_006932), Bmar9CI = Brucella melitensis biovar Abortus 2308 chromosome I (NC_007618), Bor9CI = Brucella ovis ATCC 25840 chromosome I (NC_009505), Bmir9CI = Brucella microti CCM 4915 chromosome 1 (NC_013119), Oar9CI = Brucella anthropi ATCC 49188 chromosome 1 (NC_009667), MsBCNr9C = Mesorhizobium sp. BNC1 (NC_008254).

== Expression information ==
Parallel studies assessed Smr9C expression in S. meliloti 1021 under different biological conditions; i.e. bacterial growth in TY, minimal medium (MM) and luteolin-MM broth and endosymbiotic bacteria (i.e. mature symbiotic alfalfa nodules) and high salt stress, oxidative stress and cold and hot shock stresses. Expression of Smr9C in free-living bacteria was found to be growth-dependent, being the gene strongly down-regulated when bacteria entered the stationary phase, whereas no expression was detected in endosymbiotic bacteria. Recent deep sequencing data further revealed up-regulation of Smr9C upon salt, acidic, cold-shock and heat shock stresses. Recent co-inmuno precipitation experiments corroborate that Smr9C, does bind the bacterial protein Hfq for efficient target binding.

== Promoter analysis ==
All the promoter regions of the αr9 family members examined so far are very conserved in a sequence stretch extending up to 80 bp upstream of the transcription start site of the sRNA. All loci have recognizable σ^{70}-dependent promoters showing a -35/-10 consensus motif CTTAGAC-n17-CTATAT, which has been previously shown to be widely conserved among several other genera in the α-subgroup of proteobacteria. To identify binding sites for other known transcription factors we used the fasta sequences provided by RegPredict(http://regpredict.lbl.gov/regpredict/help.html), and used those position weight matrices (PSWM) provided by RegulonDB (http://regulondb.ccg.unam.mx). We built PSWM for each transcription factor from the RegPredict sequences using the Consensus/Patser program, choosing the best final matrix for motif lengths between 14 and 30 bps a threshold average E-value < 10E-10 for each matrix was established, (see "Thresholded consensus" in http://gps-tools2.its.yale.edu). Moreover, we searched for conserved unknown motifs using MEME (http://meme.sdsc.edu/meme4_6_1/intro.html) and used relaxed regular expressions (i.e. pattern matching) over all Smr9C homologs promoters. This studies revealed the presence of 30 bp long region very conserved between positions -40 and -75, conserved MEME motif, (Figure 5). This sequence was present in all but one of the smrC9 homologs found, but no significant similarity to known transcription factor binding sites matrices could be established.

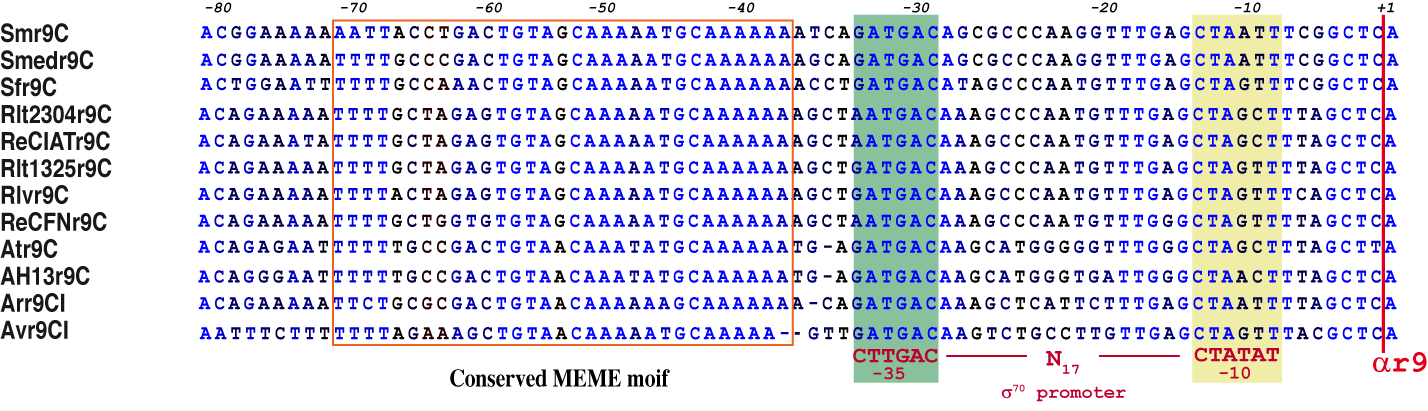
Figure 4: Alignment of the promoter region of the αr9 members. All members presented putative σ^{70} promoters with -35 and -10 boxes marked in green and red respectively. The motif found conserved in all αr9 family members is marked with an orange box.

== Genomic context ==
Most of the members of the αr9 family are trans-encoded sRNAs transcribed from independent promoters in chromosomal IGRs. Exceptions are the cis-encoded antisense Smr9C homologs of A. tumefaciens and B. microti, which are located in the opposite strand of annotated genes, partially overlapping ORFs. Most of the neighboring genes of the seed alignment's members were not annotated and thus were further manually curated. The predicted protein products of these overlapping ORFs could not be assigned to any functional category on the basis of the amino acid sequence homology. However, the genomic regions of almost all αr9 sRNAs exhibited a great degree of conservation including the sRNA-coding sequence and the upstream and downstream genes which have been predicted to code for a prolyl-tRNA syntethase (proS) and a transmembrane protein, respectively. Partial synteny of the αr9 genomic regions was observed in a few cases such as, S. medicae where instead of a proS gene an FAD-dependent pyridine nucleotide-disulfide oxidoreductase encoding gene was found upstream of the αr9 locus, and Mesorhizobium loti where no transmembrane coding gene was recognizable downstream of the sRNA gene. A special case is the Brucella group, where primary automatic annotation over their genomes identified ORFs smaller than 30 aa overlapping with the predicted αr9 sRNA in the same strand. These predicted ORFs, neither show any similarity with database entries nor any motif or signatures when searched against family and motif databases such as Interpro, PFAM or Smart, and thus, are considered here as missannotations not registered in the genomic context graph.

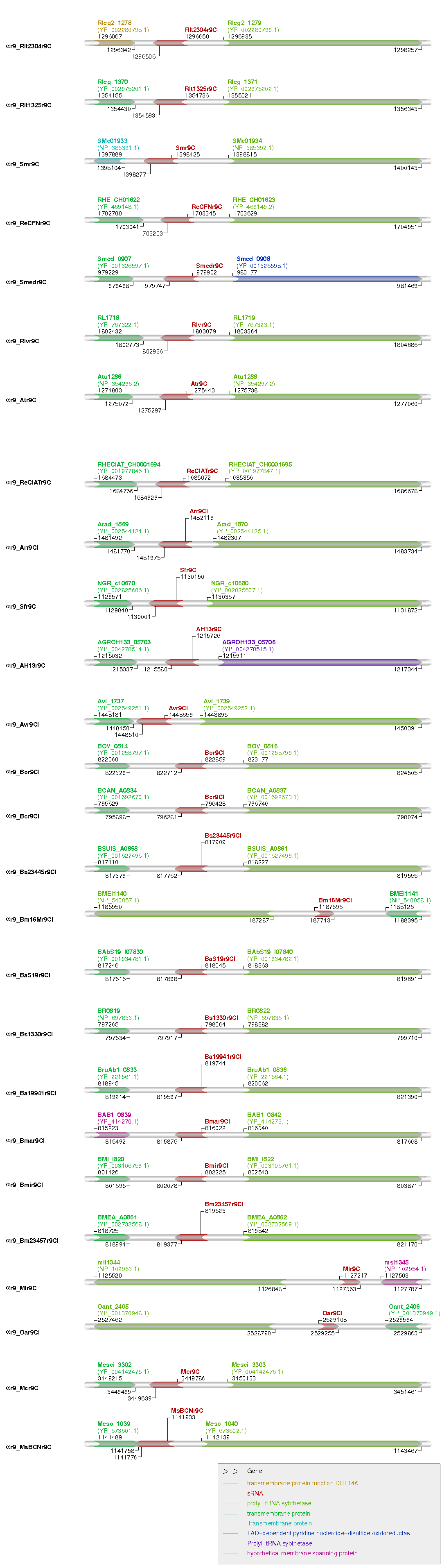
Figure 5: Genomic context scheme of Smr9C and its closest homologues in α-proteobacteria. The αr9 RNA genes are represented by red arrows and the flanking ORFs by arrows on different colors depending on their product function (legend). Numbers indicate the αr9 RNA gene's and flanking ORFs coordinates in each organism genome database. The gene strand is represented with the file direction. On the left of the figure identification names are used which correspond to a certain organism: αr9_Smr9C = Sinorhizobium meliloti 1021 (NC_003047), αr9_Smedr9C = Sinorhizobium medicae WSM419 chromosome (NC_009636), αr9_Sfr9C = Sinorhizobium fredii NGR234 chromosome (NC_012587), αr9_Atr9C = Agrobacterium tumefaciens str. C58 chromosome circular (NC_003062), αr9_AH13r9C = Agrobacterium sp. H13-3 chromosome (NC_015183), αr9_ReCIATr9C = Rhizobium etli CIAT 652 (NC_010994), αr9_Arr9CI = Agrobacterium radiobacter K84 chromosome 1 (NC_011985), αr9_Rlt2304r9C = Rhizobium leguminosarum bv. trifolii WSM2304 chromosome (NC_011369), αr9_Avr9CI = Agrobacterium vitis S4 chromosome 1 (NC_011989), αr9_Rlvr9C = Rhizobium leguminosarum bv. viciae 3841 (NC_008380), αr9_Rlt1325r9C = Rhizobium leguminosarum bv. trifolii WSM1325 (NC_012850), αr9_ReCFNr9C = Rhizobium etli CFN 42 (NC_007761), αr9_Mlr9C = Mesorhizobium loti MAFF303099 chromosome (NC_002678), αr9_Mcr9C = Mesorhizobium ciceri biovar biserrulae WSM1271 chromosome (NC_014923), αr9_Bcr9CI = Brucella canis ATCC 23365 chromosome I (NC_010103), αr9_Bs23445r9CI = Brucella suis ATCC 23445 chromosome I (NC_010169), αr9_Bm16Mr9CI = Brucella melitensis bv. 1 str. 16M chromosome I (NC_003317), αr9_BaS19r9CI = Brucella abortus S19 chromosome 1 (NC_010742), αr9_Bm23457r9CI = Brucella melitensis ATCC 23457 chromosome I (NC_012441), αr9_Bs1330r9CI = Brucella suis 1330 chromosome I (NC_004310), αr9_Ba19941r9CI = Brucella abortus bv. 1 str. 9-941 chromosome I (NC_006932), αr9_Bmar9CI = Brucella melitensis biovar Abortus 2308 chromosome I (NC_007618), αr9_Bor9CI = Brucella ovis ATCC 25840 chromosome I (NC_009505), αr9_Bmir9CI = Brucella microti CCM 4915 chromosome 1 (NC_013119), αr9_Oar9CI = Brucella anthropi ATCC 49188 chromosome 1 (NC_009667), αr9_MsBCNr9C = Mesorhizobium sp. BNC1 (NC_008254).

Table 2: Detailed Genomic context information of the αr9 sRNA members.
Family	Feature	Name	Strand	Begin	End	Protein name	Annotation	Organism
αr9_Smr9C	gene	SMc01933	R	1397889	1398104	NP_385391.1	transmembrane protein	Sinorhizobium meliloti 1021 (NC_003047)
αr9_Smr9C	sRNA	Smr9C	R	1398277	1398425			Sinorhizobium meliloti 1021 (NC_003047)
αr9_Smr9C	gene	SMc01934	D	1398815	1400143	NP_385392.1	prolyl-tRNA sybthetase	Sinorhizobium meliloti 1021 (NC_003047)
αr9_Rlt2304r9C	gene	Rleg2_1278	D	1296067	1296342	YP_002280798.1	transmembrane protein function DUF146	Rhizobium leguminosarum bv trifolii WSM2304 chromosome (NC_011369)
αr9_Rlt2304r9C	sRNA	Rlt2304r9C	R	1296506	1296650			Rhizobium leguminosarum bv trifolii WSM2304 chromosome (NC_011369)
αr9_Rlt2304r9C	gene	Rleg2_1279	D	1296935	1298257	YP_002280799.1	prolyl-tRNA sybthetase	Rhizobium leguminosarum bv trifolii WSM2304 chromosome (NC_011369)
αr9_Rlt1325r9C	gene	Rleg_1370	D	1354155	1354430	YP_002975201.1	transmembrane protein	Rhizobium leguminosarum bv trifolii WSM1325 (NC_012850)
αr9_Rlt1325r9C	sRNA	Rlt1325r9C	R	1354593	1354736			Rhizobium leguminosarum bv trifolii WSM1325 (NC_012850)
αr9_Rlt1325r9C	gene	Rleg_1371	D	1355021	1356343	YP_002975202.1	prolyl-tRNA sybthetase	Rhizobium leguminosarum bv trifolii WSM1325 (NC_012850)
αr9_ReCFNr9C	gene	RHE_CH01622	D	1702700	1703041	YP_469148.1	transmembrane protein	Rhizobium etli CFN 42 (NC_007761)
αr9_ReCFNr9C	sRNA	ReCFNr9C	R	1703203	1703345			Rhizobium etli CFN 42 (NC_007761)
αr9_ReCFNr9C	gene	RHE_CH01623	D	1703629	1704951	YP_469149.2	prolyl-tRNA sybthetase	Rhizobium etli CFN 42 (NC_007761)
αr9_Smedr9C	gene	Smed_0907	D	979229	979498	YP_001326597.1	transmembrane protein	Sinorhizobium medicae WSM419 chromosome (NC_009636)
αr9_Smedr9C	sRNA	Smedr9C	R	979747	979753			Sinorhizobium medicae WSM419 chromosome (NC_009636)
αr9_Smedr9C	gene	Smed_0908	D	980177	981469	YP_001326598.1	FAD-dependent pyridine nucleotide-disulfide oxidoreductas	Sinorhizobium medicae WSM419 chromosome (NC_009636)
αr9_Rlvr9C	gene	RL1718	D	1802432	1802773	YP_767322.1	transmembrane protein	Rhizobium leguminosarum bv. viciae 3841 (NC_008380)
αr9_Rlvr9C	sRNA	Rlvr9C	R	1802936	1803079			Rhizobium leguminosarum bv. viciae 3841 (NC_008380)
αr9_Rlvr9C	gene	RL1719	D	1803364	1804686	YP_767323.1	prolyl-tRNA sybthetase	Rhizobium leguminosarum bv. viciae 3841 (NC_008380)
αr9_Atr9C	gene	Atu1286	D	1274803	1275072	NP_354296.2	transmembrane protein	Agrobacterium tumefaciens str. C58 chromosome circular (NC_003062)
αr9_Atr9C	sRNA	Atr9C	R	1275297	1275443			Agrobacterium tumefaciens str. C58 chromosome circular (NC_003062)
αr9_Atr9C	gene	Atu1288	D	1275738	1277060	NP_354297.2	prolyl-tRNA sybthetase	Agrobacterium tumefaciens str. C58 chromosome circular (NC_003062)
αr9_ReCIATr9C	gene	RHECIAT_CH0001694	D	1684473	1684766	YP_001977846.1	transmembrane protein	Rhizobium etli CIAT 652 (NC_010994)
αr9_ReCIATr9C	sRNA	ReCIATr9C	R	1684929	1685072			Rhizobium etli CIAT 652 (NC_010994)
αr9_ReCIATr9C	gene	RHECIAT_CH0001695	D	1685356	1686678	YP_001977847.1	prolyl-tRNA sybthetase	Rhizobium etli CIAT 652 (NC_010994)
αr9_Arr9CI	gene	Arad_1869	D	1481492	1481770	YP_002544124.1	transmembrane protein	Agrobacterium radiobacter K84 chromosome 1 (NC_011985)
αr9_Arr9CI	sRNA	Arr9CI	R	1481975	1482119			Agrobacterium radiobacter K84 chromosome 1 (NC_011985)
αr9_Arr9CI	gene	Arad_1870	D	1482307	1483734	YP_002544125.1	prolyl-tRNA sybthetase	Agrobacterium radiobacter K84 chromosome 1 (NC_011985)
αr9_Sfr9C	gene	NGR_c10670	D	1129571	1129840	YP_002825606.1	transmembrane protein	Sinorhizobium fredii NGR234 chromosome (NC_012587)
αr9_Sfr9C	sRNA	Sfr9C	R	1130001	1130150			Sinorhizobium fredii NGR234 chromosome (NC_012587)
αr9_Sfr9C	gene	NGR_c10680	D	1130367	1131872	YP_002825607.1	prolyl-tRNA sybthetase	Sinorhizobium fredii NGR234 chromosome (NC_012587)
αr9_AH13r9C	gene	AGROH133_05703	D	1215032	1215337	YP_004278514.1	transmembrane protein	Agrobacterium sp. H13-3 chromosome (NC_015183)
αr9_AH13r9C	sRNA	AH13r9C	R	1215580	1215726			Agrobacterium sp. H13-3 chromosome (NC_015183)
αr9_AH13r9C	gene	AGROH133_05706	D	1215911	1217344	YP_004278515.1	Prolyl-tRNA sybthetase	Agrobacterium sp. H13-3 chromosome (NC_015183)
αr9_Avr9CI	gene	Avi_1737	D	1448181	1448450	YP_002549251.1	transmembrane protein	Agrobacterium vitis S4 chromosome 1 (NC_011989)
αr9_Avr9CI	sRNA	Avr9CI	R	1448510	1448659			Agrobacterium vitis S4 chromosome 1 (NC_011989)
αr9_Avr9CI	gene	Avi_1739	D	1448895	1450391	YP_002549252.1	prolyl-tRNA sybthetase	Agrobacterium vitis S4 chromosome 1 (NC_011989)
αr9_Bor9CI	gene	BOV_0814	D	822060	822329	YP_001258797.1	transmembrane protein	Brucella ovis ATCC 25840 chromosome I (NC_009505)
αr9_Bor9CI	sRNA	Bor9CI	R	822712	822859			Brucella ovis ATCC 25840 chromosome I (NC_009505)
αr9_Bor9CI	gene	BOV_0816	D	823177	824505	YP_001258799.1	prolyl-tRNA sybthetase	Brucella ovis ATCC 25840 chromosome I (NC_009505)
αr9_Bcr9CI	gene	BCAN_A0834	D	795629	795898	YP_001592670.1	transmembrane protein	Brucella canis ATCC 23365 chromosome I (NC_010103)
αr9_Bcr9CI	sRNA	Bcr9CI	R	796281	796428			Brucella canis ATCC 23365 chromosome I (NC_010103)
αr9_Bcr9CI	gene	BCAN_A0837	D	796746	798074	YP_001592673.1	prolyl-tRNA sybthetase	Brucella canis ATCC 23365 chromosome I (NC_010103)
αr9_Bs23445r9CI	gene	BSUIS_A0858	D	817110	817379	YP_001627496.1	transmembrane protein	Brucella suis ATCC 23445 chromosome I (NC_010169)
αr9_Bs23445r9CI	sRNA	Bs23445r9CI	R	817762	817909			Brucella suis ATCC 23445 chromosome I (NC_010169)
αr9_Bs23445r9CI	gene	BSUIS_A0861	D	818227	819555	YP_001627499.1	prolyl-tRNA sybthetase	Brucella suis ATCC 23445 chromosome I (NC_010169)
αr9_Bm16Mr9CI	gene	BMEI1140	R	1185950	1187287	NP_540057.1	prolyl-tRNA sybthetase	Brucella melitensis bv. 1 str. 16M chromosome I (NC_003317)
αr9_Bm16Mr9CI	sRNA	Bm16Mr9CI	D	1187596	1187743			Brucella melitensis bv. 1 str. 16M chromosome I (NC_003317)
αr9_Bm16Mr9CI	gene	BMEI1141	R	1188126	1188395	NP_540058.1	transmembrane protein	Brucella melitensis bv. 1 str. 16M chromosome I (NC_003317)
αr9_BaS19r9CI	gene	BAbS19_I07830	D	817246	817515	YP_001934781.1	transmembrane protein	Brucella abortus S19 chromosome 1 (NC_010742)
αr9_BaS19r9CI	sRNA	BaS19r9CI	R	817898	818045			Brucella abortus S19 chromosome 1 (NC_010742)
αr9_BaS19r9CI	gene	BAbS19_I07840	D	818363	819691	YP_001934782.1	prolyl-tRNA sybthetase	Brucella abortus S19 chromosome 1 (NC_010742)
αr9_Bs1330r9CI	gene	BR0819	D	797265	797534	NP_697833.1	transmembrane protein	Brucella suis 1330 chromosome I (NC_004310)
αr9_Bs1330r9CI	sRNA	Bs1330r9CI	R	797917	798064			Brucella suis 1330 chromosome I (NC_004310)
αr9_Bs1330r9CI	gene	BR0822	D	798382	799710	NP_697836.1	prolyl-tRNA sybthetase	Brucella suis 1330 chromosome I (NC_004310)
αr9_Ba19941r9CI	gene	BruAb1_0833	D	818945	819214	YP_221561.1	transmembrane protein	Brucella abortus bv. 1 str. 9-941 chromosome I (NC_006932)
αr9_Ba19941r9CI	sRNA	Ba19941r9CI	R	819597	819744			Brucella abortus bv. 1 str. 9-941 chromosome I (NC_006932)
αr9_Ba19941r9CI	gene	BruAb1_0836	D	820062	821390	YP_221564.1	prolyl-tRNA sybthetase	Brucella abortus bv. 1 str. 9-941 chromosome I (NC_006932)
αr9_Bmar9CI	gene	BAB1_0839	D	815223	815492	YP_414270.1	hypothetical membrane spanning protein	Brucella melitensis biovar Abortus 2308 chromosome I (NC_007618)
αr9_Bmar9CI	sRNA	Bmar9CI	R	815875	816022			Brucella melitensis biovar Abortus 2308 chromosome I (NC_007618)
αr9_Bmar9CI	gene	BAB1_0842	D	816340	817668	YP_414273.1	prolyl-tRNA sybthetase	Brucella melitensis biovar Abortus 2308 chromosome I (NC_007618)
αr9_Bmir9CI	gene	BMI_I820	D	801426	801695	YP_003106759.1	transmembrane protein	Brucella microti CCM 4915 chromosome 1 (NC_013119)
αr9_Bmir9CI	sRNA	Bmir9CI	R	802078	802225			Brucella microti CCM 4915 chromosome 1 (NC_013119)
αr9_Bmir9CI	gene	BMI_I822	D	802543	803871	YP_003106761.1	prolyl-tRNA sybthetase	Brucella microti CCM 4915 chromosome 1 (NC_013119)
αr9_Bm23457r9CI	gene	BMEA_A0861	D	818725	818994	YP_002732568.1	transmembrane protein	Brucella melitensis ATCC 23457 chromosome I (NC_012441)
αr9_Bm23457r9CI	sRNA	Bm23457r9CI	R	819377	819523			Brucella melitensis ATCC 23457 chromosome I (NC_012441)
αr9_Bm23457r9CI	gene	BMEA_A0862	D	819842	821170	YP_002732569.1	prolyl-tRNA sybthetase	Brucella melitensis ATCC 23457 chromosome I (NC_012441)
αr9_Mlr9C	gene	mll1344	R	1125520	1126848	NP_102953.1	prolyl-tRNA sybthetase	Mesorhizobium loti MAFF303099 chromosome (NC_002678)
αr9_Mlr9C	sRNA	Mlr9C	D	1127217	1127363			Mesorhizobium loti MAFF303099 chromosome (NC_002678)
αr9_Mlr9C	gene	msl1345	R	1127503	1127787	NP_102954.1	hypothetical membrane spanning protein	Mesorhizobium loti MAFF303099 chromosome (NC_002678)
αr9_Oar9CI	gene	Oant_2405	R	2527462	2528790	YP_001370948.1	prolyl-tRNA sybthetase	Brucella anthropi ATCC 49188 chromosome 1 (NC_009667)
αr9_Oar9CI	sRNA	Oar9CI	D	2529108	2529255			Brucella anthropi ATCC 49188 chromosome 1 (NC_009667)
αr9_Oar9CI	gene	Oant_2406	R	2529594	2529863	YP_001370949.1	transmembrane protein	Brucella anthropi ATCC 49188 chromosome 1 (NC_009667)
αr9_Mcr9C	gene	Mesci_3302	D	3449215	3449499	YP_004142475.1	transmembrane protein	Mesorhizobium ciceri biovar biserrulae WSM1271 chromosome (NC_014923)
αr9_Mcr9C	sRNA	Mcr9C	R	3449639	3449786			Mesorhizobium ciceri biovar biserrulae WSM1271 chromosome (NC_014923)
αr9_Mcr9C	gene	Mesci_3303	D	3450133	3451461	YP_004142476.1	prolyl-tRNA sybthetase	Mesorhizobium ciceri biovar biserrulae WSM1271 chromosome (NC_014923)
αr9_MsBCNr9C	gene	Meso_1039	D	1141489	1141758	YP_673601.1	transmembrane protein	Mesorhizobium sp. BNC1 (NC_008254)
αr9_MsBCNr9C	sRNA	MsBCNr9C	R	1141776	1141933			Mesorhizobium sp. BNC1 (NC_008254)
αr9_MsBCNr9C	gene	Meso_1040	D	1142139	1143467	YP_673602.1	prolyl-tRNA sybthetase	Mesorhizobium sp. BNC1 (NC_008254)
