= BIOBASE =

BIOBASE may refer to:

- BIOBASE (company), a German bioinformatics company specializing in biological databases
- Elsevier BIOBASE, a biological bibliographic database published by Elsevier
