= Αr7 RNA =

αr7 is a family of bacterial small non-coding RNAs with representatives in a broad group of Alphaproteobacterial species from the order Hyphomicrobiales. The first member of this family (Smr7C 150nt) was found in a Sinorhizobium meliloti 1021 locus located in the chromosome (C). Further homology and structure conservation analysis identified full-length homologs in several nitrogen-fixing symbiotic rhizobia (i.e. R. leguminosarum bv.viciae, R. leguminosarum bv. trifolii, R. etli, and several Mesorhizobium species), in the plant pathogens belonging to Agrobacterium species (i.e. A. tumefaciens, A. vitis, A. radiobacter, and Agrobacterium H13) as well as in a broad spectrum of Brucella species (B. ovis, B. canis, B. abortus and B. microtis, and several biobars of B. melitensis). αr7 RNA species are 134-159 nucleotides (nt) long (Table 1) and share a well defined common secondary structure (Figure 1, Figure 2). αr7 transcripts can be catalogued as trans-acting sRNAs expressed from well-defined promoter regions of independent transcription units within intergenic regions (IGRs) of the Alphaproteobacterial genomes (Figure 4).

== Discovery and structure ==
Smr7C sRNA was described by del Val et al. in the intergenic regions (IGRs) of the reference S. meliloti 1021 strain (Sinorhizobium meliloti 1021). Northern hybridization experiments detected two RNA species expressed from the smr7C locus, which accumulated differentially in free-living and endosymbiotic bacteria. TAP-based 5'-RACE experiments mapped the transcription start site (TSS) to two close G residues. From the six independent sequences obtained, five mapped to residue 201,681 in the chromosome and one to the upstream residue 201,679. Furthermore, an additional 5'-RACE product could be obtained from this transcript in both TAP- and mock-treated RNA samples. The sequence of this second RACE product mapped the processing site of Smr7C to residue 201,723 nt in the S. meliloti 1021 genome. The 3'-end was assumed to be located at the 201,828 nt position matching the last residue of the consecutive stretch of Us of a bona fide Rho-independent terminator. Parallel and later studies in which Smr7C transcript is referred to as sra03 or Sm13, independently confirmed the expression this sRNA in S. melilloti and in its closely related strain 2011. Recent deep sequencing-based characterization of the small RNA fraction (50-350 nt) of S. meliloti 2021 further also confirmed the expression of Smr7C (here referred to as SmelC023), and mapped the 5'- end of the full-length transcript to the same position in the S. meliloti 1021 genome, and the 3' end to position 201,825.

The nucleotide sequence of Smr7C was initially used as query to search against the Rfam database (version 10.0;). This homology search rendered no matches to known bacterial sRNA in this database. Smr7C was next BLASTed with default parameters against all the currently available bacterial genomes (1,615 sequences at 20 April 2011;). The regions exhibiting significant homology to the query sequence (78-89% similarity) were extracted to create a Covariance Model (CM) from a seed alignment using Infernal (version1.0). This CM was used in a further search for new members of the αr7 family in the existing bacterial genomic databases (Table 1) and to create the final CM model (Figure 1).

Table 1: αr7 homologs in other symbionts and pathogens
CM model	Name	GI accession number	begin	end	strand	%GC	length	Organism
αr7	Smr7C	gi|15963753|ref|NC_003047.1|	201679	201828	+	64	150	Sinorhizobium meliloti 1021
αr7	Smedr7C	gi|150395228|ref|NC_009636.1|	3585152	3585302	+	60	151	Sinorhizobium medicae WSM419 chromosome
αr7	Sfr7C	gi|227820587|ref|NC_012587.1|	3727302	3727450	-	66	149	Sinorhizobium fredii NGR234 chromosome
αr7	Atr7C	gi|159184118|ref|NC_003062.2|	112535	112678	-	65	144	Agrobacterium tumefaciens str. C58 chromosome circular
αr7	AH13r7C	gi|325291453|ref|NC_015183.1|	112523	112667	-	63	145	Agrobacterium sp. H13-3 chromosome
αr7	ReCIATr7C	gi|190889639|ref|NC_010994.1|	205678	205811	-	61	134	Rhizobium etli CIAT 652
αr7	Arr7CI	gi|222084201|ref|NC_011985.1|	243240	243377	-	62	138	Agrobacterium radiobacter K84 chromosome 1
αr7	Rlt2304r7C	gi|209547612|ref|NC_011369.1|	4280520	4280653	-	63	134	Rhizobium leguminosarum bv. trifolii WSM2304 chromosome
αr7	Avr7CI	gi|222147015|ref|NC_011989.1|	255869	256019	+	60	151	Agrobacterium vitis S4 chromosome 1
αr7	Rlvr7C	gi|116249766|ref|NC_008380.1|	192620	192753	-	62	134	Rhizobium leguminosarum bv. viciae 3841
αr7	Rlt1325r7C	gi|241202755|ref|NC_012850.1|	4553564	4553697	-	62	134	Rhizobium leguminosarum bv. trifolii WSM1325
αr7	ReCFNr7C	gi|86355669|ref|NC_007761.1|	163762	163895	-	60	134	Rhizobium etli CFN 42
αr7	Mlr7C	gi|57165207|ref|NC_002678.2|	2648243	2648390	-	65	148	Mesorhizobium loti MAFF303099 chromosome
αr7	MsBNCr7C	gi|110632362|ref|NC_008254.1|	4251581	4251722	+	60	142	Mesorhizobium sp. BNC1
αr7	Mcr7C	gi|319779749|ref|NC_014923.1|	1781903	1782047	+	68	145	Mesorhizobium ciceri biovar biserrulae WSM1271 chromosome
αr7	Bcr7CI	gi|161617991|ref|NC_010103.1|	134573	134715	-	62	143	Brucella canis ATCC 23365 chromosome I
αr7	Bs23445r7CI	gi|163842277|ref|NC_010169.1|	134908	135050	-	62	143	Brucella suis ATCC 23445 chromosome I
αr7	Bm16Mr7CI	gi|17986284|ref|NC_003317.1|	1868345	1868487	+	62	143	Brucella melitensis bv. 1 str. 16M chromosome I
αr7	BaS19r7CI	gi|189023268|ref|NC_010742.1|	134335	134477	-	62	143	Brucella abortus S19 chromosome 1
αr7	Bm23457r7CI	gi|225851546|ref|NC_012441.1|	134555	134697	-	62	143	Brucella melitensis ATCC 23457 chromosome I
αr7	Bs1330r7CI	gi|56968325|ref|NC_004310.3|	134590	134732	-	62	143	Brucella suis 1330 chromosome I
αr7	Ba19941r7CI	gi|62288991|ref|NC_006932.1|	135949	136091	-	62	143	Brucella abortus bv. 1 str. 9-941 chromosome I
αr7	Bmar7CI	gi|82698932|ref|NC_007618.1|	132316	132458	-	62	143	Brucella melitensis biovar Abortus 2308 chromosome I
αr7	Bor7CI	gi|148558820|ref|NC_009505.1|	134888	135029	-	63	142	Brucella ovis ATCC 25840 chromosome I
αr7	Bmir7CI	gi|256368465|ref|NC_013119.1|	136167	136309	-	62	143	Brucella microti CCM 4915 chromosome 1
αr7	Oar7CI	gi|153007346|ref|NC_009667.1|	149814	149972	-	58	159	Brucella anthropi ATCC 49188 chromosome 1

The results were manually inspected to deduce a consensus secondary structure for the family (Figure 1 and Figure 2). The consensus structure was also independently predicted with the program locARNATE with very similar predictions. The manual inspection of the sequences found with the CM using Infernal allowed finding 26 true homolog sequences, all of them present as single chromosomal copies in the Alphaproteobacterial genomes. The rhizobial species encoding the closer homologs to Smr7C were: S. medicae and S. fredii, two R. leguminosarum trifolii strains (WSM2304 and WSM1325), two R. etli strains CFN 42 and CIAT 652, the reference R. leguminosarum bv. viciae 3841 strain, and the Agrobacterium species A. vitis, A. tumefaciens, A. radiobacter and A. H13 and the Mesorhizobum species loti, M. ciceri and M. BNC. All these sequences showed significant Infernal E-values (3.66E-49 – 2.93E-12) and bit-scores. The rest of the sequences found with the model showed high E-values between (1.58E-10 and 2.88E-09) but lower bit-scores and are encoded by Brucella species (B. ovis, B. canis, B. abortus, B. microtis, several biobars of B. melitensis, and B. anthropi).

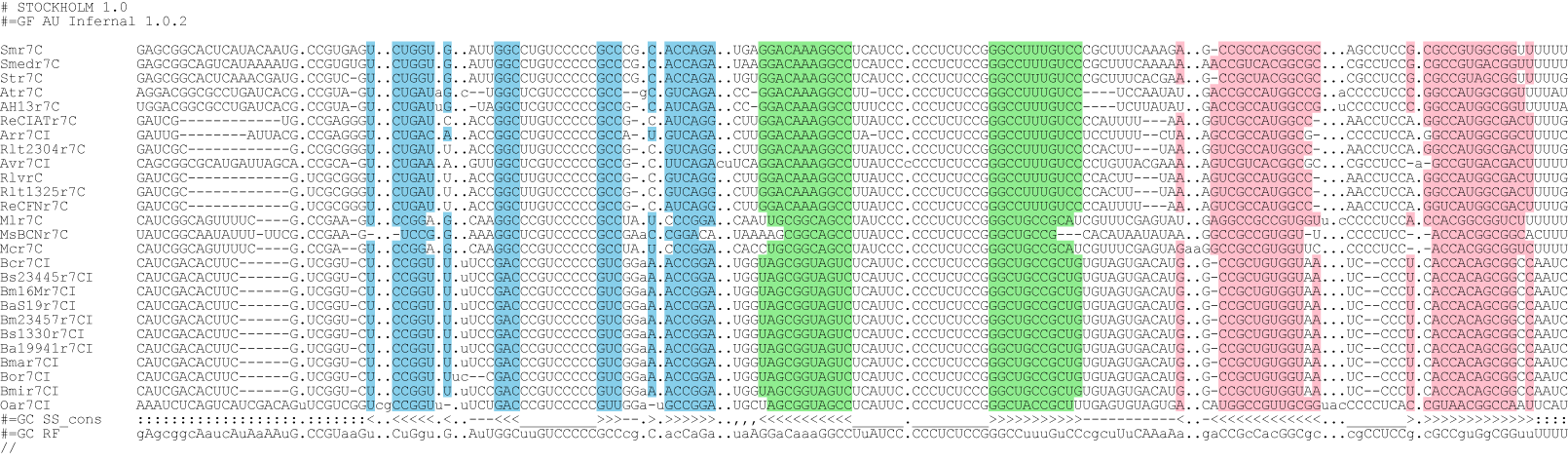
Figure 1:
Covariance Model in stockholm format showing the consensus structure for the αr7 family. Each of the stems represented by the structure line #=GC SS_cons is in a different color, corresponding the red one to the rho independent terminator stem. Covariance Model in stockholm format can be downloaded at gps-tools2.its.yale.edu.

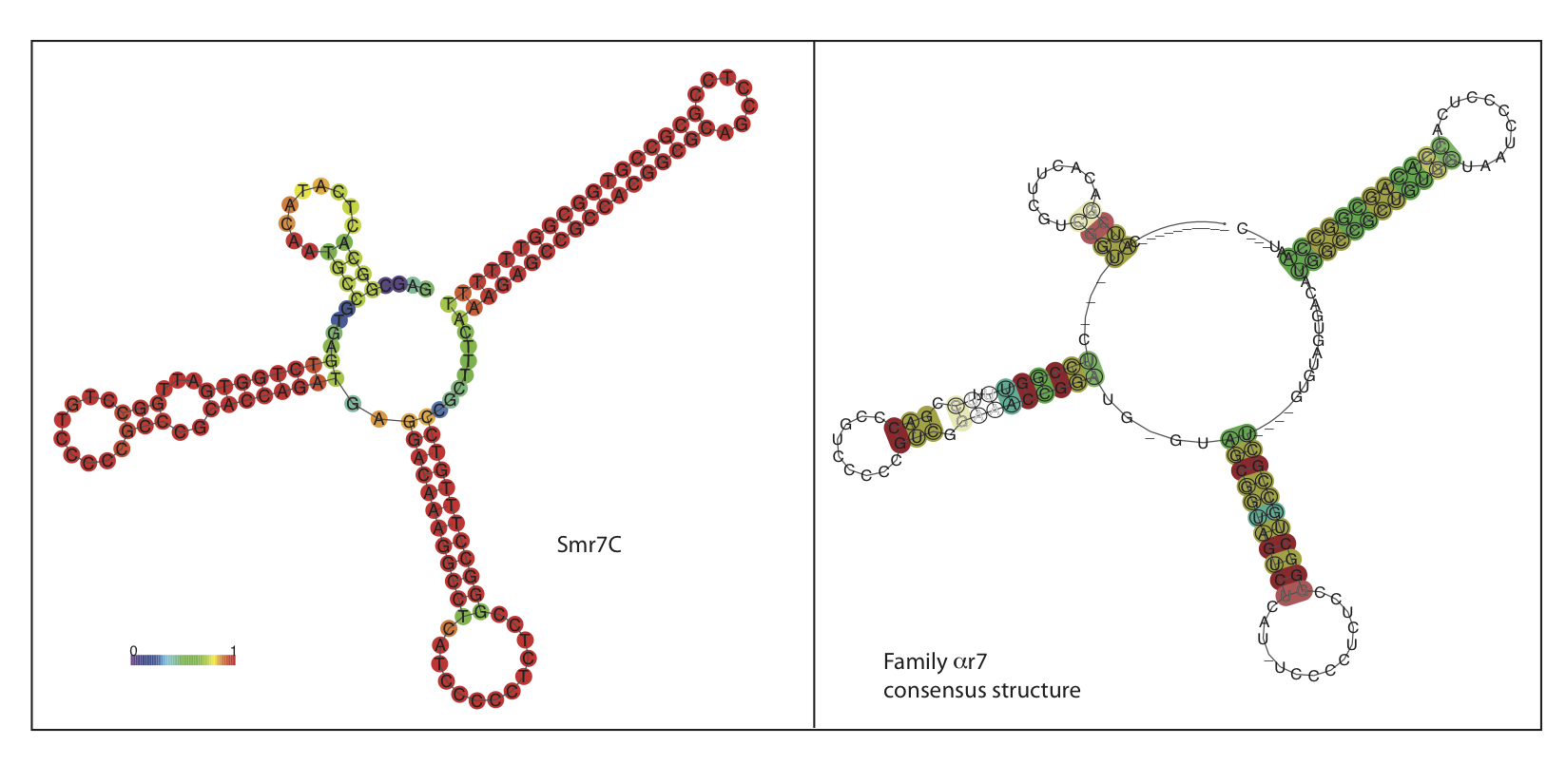
Figure 2:
Consensus secondary structure of Smr7C and the ar7 family predicted by RNA and RNAalifold. The color scheme of Smr7C represents the base pairs probabilities. The coloring scheme for the ar7 family structure is based on the base pairs conservation: Red: base pair occurring in all sequences used to generate the consensus; yellow: two types of base pairing occur; Green: three types of base pairing occur. The shading of base pairs represents: Saturated, no inconsistent sequences; Pale, one inconsistent sequence; Very pale, two inconsistent sequences.

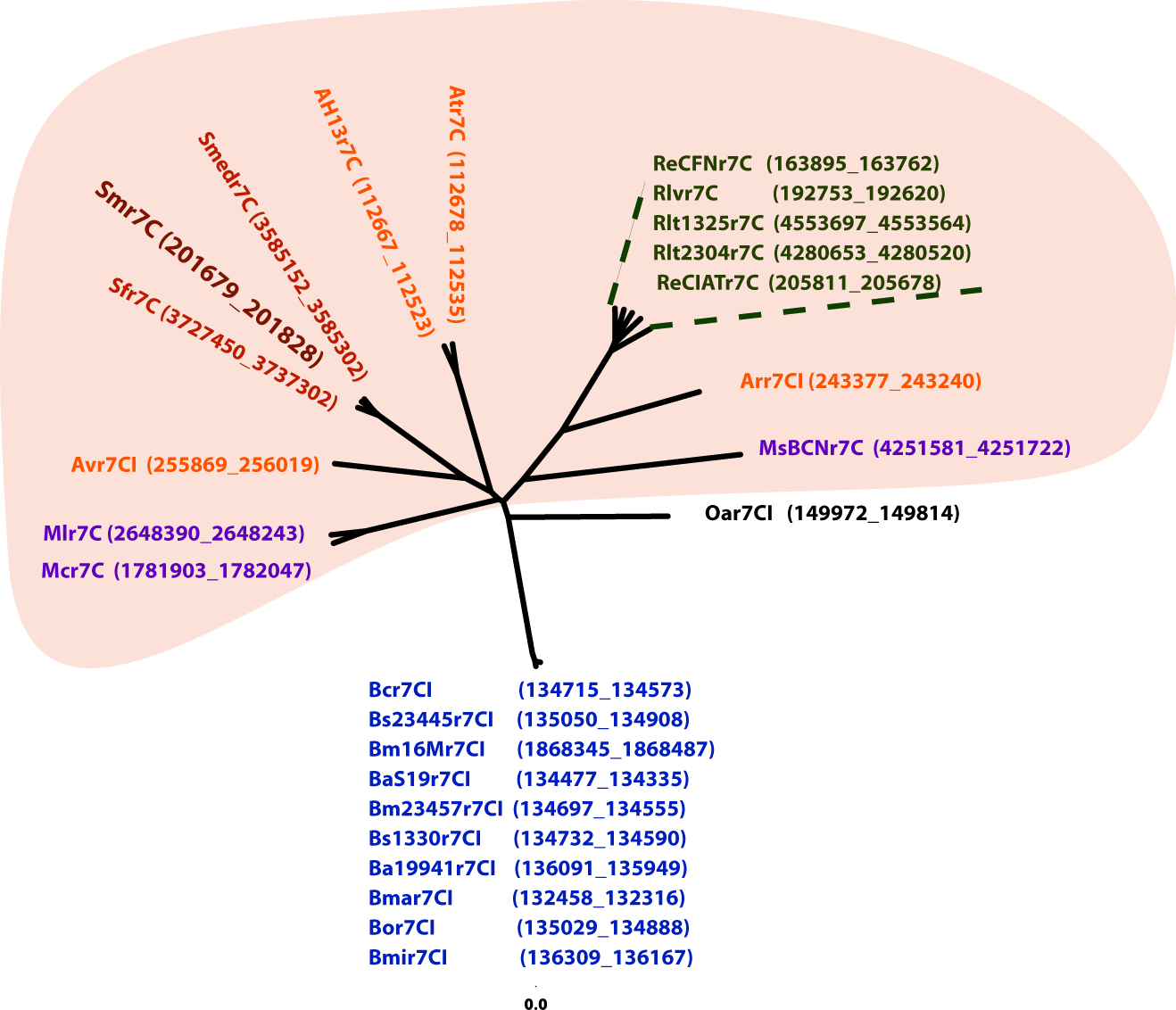
Figure 3:
Phylogenetic distribution of known and predicted αr7 genes. Gene numbers are based on computational analysis using the program Infernal. Legend: Smedr7C = Sinorhizobium medicae WSM419 chromosome (NC_009636), Smr7C = Sinorhizobium meliloti 1021 (NC_003047), Sfr7C = Sinorhizobium fredii NGR234 chromosome (NC_012587), Atr7C = Agrobacterium tumefaciens str. C58 chromosome circular (NC_003062), AH13r7C = Agrobacterium sp. H13-3 chromosome (NC_015183), ReCIATr7C = Rhizobium etli CIAT 652 (NC_010994), Arr7CI = Agrobacterium radiobacter K84 chromosome 1 (NC_011985), Rlt2304r7C = Rhizobium leguminosarum bv. trifolii WSM2304 chromosome (NC_011369), Avr7CI = Agrobacterium vitis S4 chromosome 1 (NC_011989), Rlvr7C = Rhizobium leguminosarum bv. viciae 3841 (NC_008380), Rlt1325r7C = Rhizobium leguminosarum bv. trifolii WSM1325 (NC_012850), ReCFNr7C = Rhizobium etli CFN 42 (NC_007761), Mlr7C = Mesorhizobium loti MAFF303099 chromosome (NC_002678), Mcr7C = Mesorhizobium ciceri biovar biserrulae WSM1271 chromosome (NC_014923), Bcr7CI = Brucella canis ATCC 23365 chromosome I (NC_010103), Bs23445r7CI = Brucella suis ATCC 23445 chromosome I (NC_010169), Bm16Mr7CI = Brucella melitensis bv. 1 str. 16M chromosome I (NC_003317), BaS19r7CI = Brucella abortus S19 chromosome 1 (NC_010742), Bm23457r7CI = Brucella melitensis ATCC 23457 chromosome I (NC_012441), Bs1330r7CI = Brucella suis 1330 chromosome I (NC_004310), Ba19941r7CI = Brucella abortus bv. 1 str. 9-941 chromosome I (NC_006932), Bmar7CI = Brucella melitensis biovar Abortus 2308 chromosome I (NC_007618), Bor7CI = Brucella ovis ATCC 25840 chromosome I (NC_009505), Bmir7CI = Brucella microti CCM 4915 chromosome 1 (NC_013119), Oar7CI = Brucella anthropi ATCC 49188 chromosome 1 (NC_009667), MsBNCr7C = Mesorhizobium sp. BNC1 (NC_008254).

== Expression information ==
Parallel studies assessed Smr7C expression in S. meliloti 1021 under different biological conditions; i.e. bacterial growth in TY, minimal medium (MM) and luteolin-MM broth and endosymbiotic bacteria (i.e. mature symbiotic alfalfa nodules). Expression of Smr7C in free-living bacteria was found to be growth-dependent, being the gene strongly down-regulated when bacteria entered the stationary phase. Expression of SmrC7 increased ~13-fold in nodules when compared with free-living bacteria (log phase TY or MM cultures), suggesting the induction of this sRNAs during bacterial infection and/or bacteroid differentiation. SmrC7 expression has also been proved in parallel studies.

== Promoter analysis ==
All the promoter regions of the αr7 family members examined so far are very conserved in a sequence stretch extending up to 80 bp upstream of the transcription start site of the sRNA. All closest homologous loci have recognizable σ^{70}-dependent promoters showing a -35/-10 consensus motif CTTAGAC-n17-CTATAT, which has been previously shown to be widely conserved among several other genera in the Alphaproteobacteria. To identify binding sites for other known transcription factors we used the fasta sequences provided by RegPredict, and used those position weight matrices (PSWM) provided by RegulonDB. We built PSWM for each transcription factor from the RegPredict sequences using the Consensus/Patser program, choosing the best final matrix for motif lengths between 14 and 30 bps a threshold average E-value < 10E-10 for each matrix was established, (see "Thresholded consensus" in gps-tools2.its.yale.edu). Moreover, we searched for conserved unknown motifs using MEME and used relaxed regular expressions (i.e. pattern matching) over all promoters of the Smr7C homologs promoters.

This studies revealed a 20 bp conserved motif in ll promoter regions, marked in orange as MEME conserved motif, in (Figure 4), but no significant similarity to known transcription factor binding sites matrices could be established.

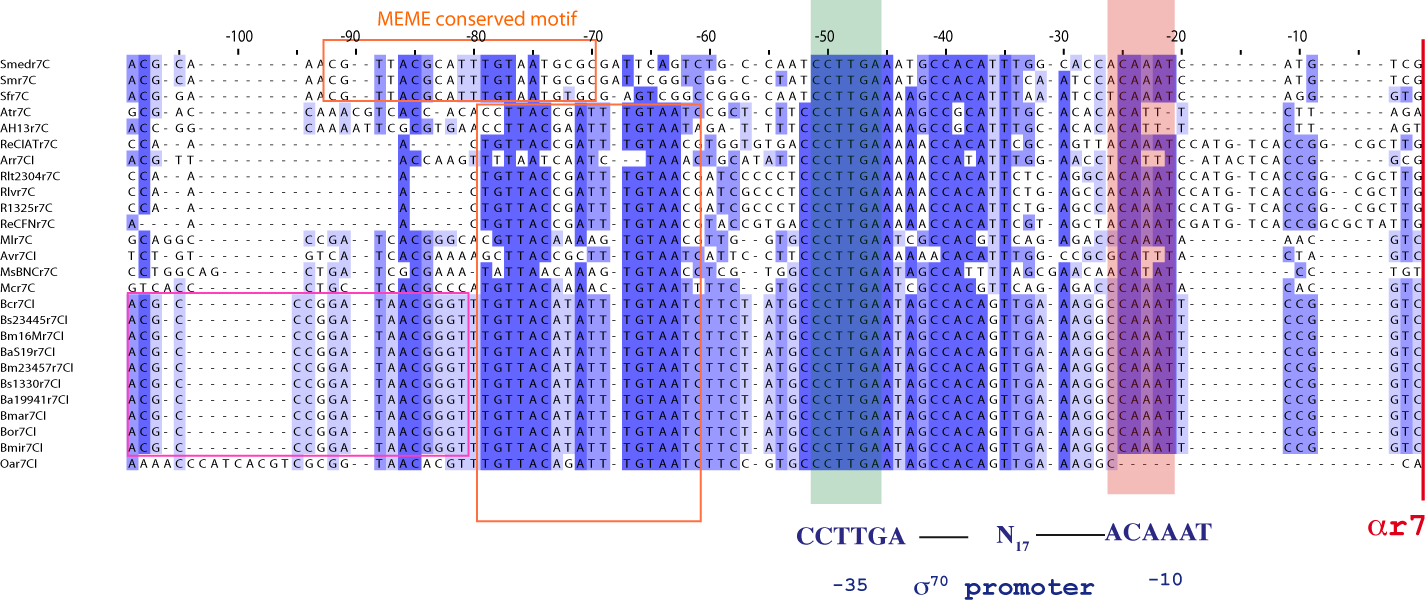
Figure 4: Alignment of the promoter region of the αr7 members. All analyzed members presented putative σ^{70} promoters with -35 and -10 boxes marked in green and red respectively.

== Genomic context ==
All identified members of the αr7 family are trans-encoded sRNAs transcribed from independent promoters in chromosomal IGRs. Most of the neighboring genes of the seed alignment's members were not annotated and thus were further manually curated.

The αr7 sRNAs' genomic regions of the Sinorhizobium, Rhizobium and Agrobacterium group members exhibited a great degree of conservation with the upstream and downstream genes coding for a DNA polymerase, and a MarR family transcriptional regulator, respectively. Partial synteny of the αr7 genomic regions was observed in the Mesorhizobium and Brucella group, where instead of the MarR family transcriptional regulator gene, a peptidase encoding gene was found.

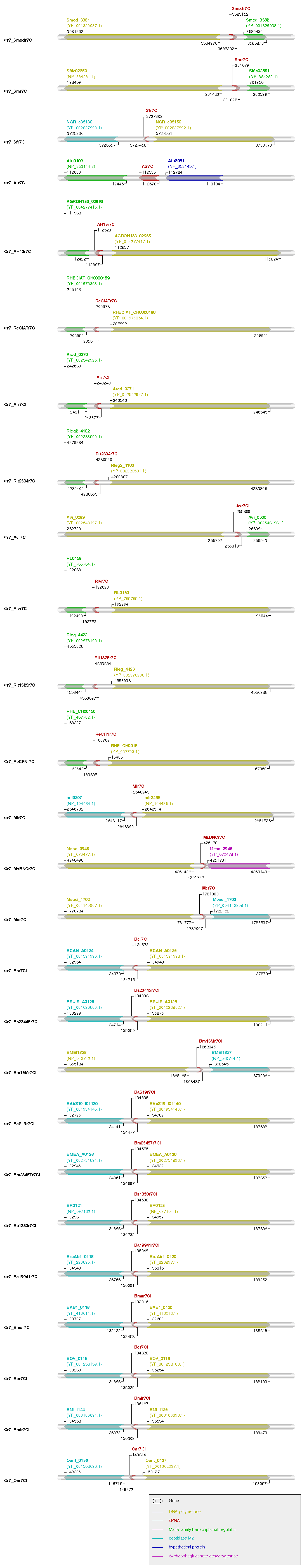
Figure 5:Genomic context scheme of Smr7C and its closest homologues in other organisms. The αr7 RNA genes are represented by red arrows and the flanking ORFs by arrows on different colors depending on their product function (legend). Numbers indicate the αr7 RNA gene's and flanking ORFs coordinates in each organism genome database. The gene strand is represented with the file direction. On the left of the figure identification names are used which correspond to a certain organism: αr7_Smedr7C = Sinorhizobium medicae WSM419 chromosome (NC_009636), αr7_Smr7C = Sinorhizobium meliloti 1021 (NC_003047), αr7_Sfr7C = Sinorhizobium fredii NGR234 chromosome (NC_012587), αr7_Atr7C = Agrobacterium tumefaciens str. C58 chromosome circular (NC_003062), αr7_AH13r7C = Agrobacterium sp. H13-3 chromosome (NC_015183), αr7_ReCIATr7C = Rhizobium etli CIAT 652 (NC_010994), αr7_Arr7CI = Agrobacterium radiobacter K84 chromosome 1 (NC_011985), αr7_Rlt2304r7C = Rhizobium leguminosarum bv. trifolii WSM2304 chromosome (NC_011369), αr7_Avr7CI = Agrobacterium vitis S4 chromosome 1 (NC_011989), αr7_Rlvr7C = Rhizobium leguminosarum bv. viciae 3841 (NC_008380), αr7_Rlt1325r7C = Rhizobium leguminosarum bv. trifolii WSM1325 (NC_012850), αr7_ReCFNr7C = Rhizobium etli CFN 42 (NC_007761), αr7_Mlr7C = Mesorhizobium loti MAFF303099 chromosome (NC_002678), αr7_MsBNCr7C = Mesorhizobium sp. BNC1 (NC_008254), αr7_Mcr7C = Mesorhizobium ciceri biovar biserrulae WSM1271 chromosome (NC_014923), αr7_Bcr7CI = Brucella canis ATCC 23365 chromosome I (NC_010103), αr7_Bs23445r7CI = Brucella suis ATCC 23445 chromosome I (NC_010169), αr7_Bm16Mr7CI = Brucella melitensis bv. 1 str. 16M chromosome I (NC_003317), αr7_BaS19r7CI = Brucella abortus S19 chromosome 1 (NC_010742), αr7_Bm23457r7CI = Brucella melitensis ATCC 23457 chromosome I (NC_012441), αr7_Bs1330r7CI = Brucella suis 1330 chromosome I (NC_004310), αr7_Ba19941r7CI = Brucella abortus bv. 1 str. 9-941 chromosome I (NC_006932), αr7_Bmar7CI = Brucella melitensis biovar Abortus 2308 chromosome I (NC_007618), αr7_Bor7CI = Brucella ovis ATCC 25840 chromosome I (NC_009505), αr7_Bmir7CI = Brucella microti CCM 4915 chromosome 1 (NC_013119), αr7_Oar7CI = Brucella anthropi ATCC 49188 chromosome 1 (NC_009667).

Table 2: Detailed Genomic context information of the α7 sRNA seed members.
Family	Feature	Name	Strand	Begin	End	Protein name	Annotation	Organism
αr7	gene	Smed_3381	R	3581962	3584976	YP_001329037.1	DNA polymerase	Sinorhizobium medicae WSM419 chromosome (NC_009636)
αr7	sRNA	Smedr7C	D	3585152	3585302	-	-	Sinorhizobium medicae WSM419 chromosome (NC_009636)
αr7	gene	Smed_3382	D	3585430	3585873	YP_001329038.1	MarR family transcriptional regulator	Sinorhizobium medicae WSM419 chromosome (NC_009636)
αr7	gene	SMc02850	R	198469	201483	NP_384281.1	DNA polymerase	Sinorhizobium meliloti 1021 (NC_003047)
αr7	sRNA	Smr7C	D	201679	201828	-	-	Sinorhizobium meliloti 1021 (NC_003047)
αr7	gene	SMc02851	D	201956	202399	NP_384282.1	MarR family transcriptional regulator	Sinorhizobium meliloti 1021 (NC_003047)
αr7	gene	NGR_c35130	R	3725266	3726657	YP_002827990.1	peptidase M2	Sinorhizobium fredii NGR234 chromosome (NC_012587)
αr7	sRNA	Sfr7C	R	3727302	3727450	-	-	Sinorhizobium fredii NGR234 chromosome (NC_012587)
αr7	gene	NGR_c35150	D	3727551	3730673	YP_002827992.1	DNA polymerase	Sinorhizobium fredii NGR234 chromosome (NC_012587)
αr7	gene	Atu0109	R	112000	112446	NP_353144.2	MarR family transcriptional regulator	Agrobacterium tumefaciens str. C58 chromosome circular (NC_003062)
αr7	sRNA	Atr7C	R	112535	112678	-	-	Agrobacterium tumefaciens str. C58 chromosome circular (NC_003062)
αr7	gene	Atu8081	R	112724	113134	NP_353145.1	hypothetical protein	Agrobacterium tumefaciens str. C58 chromosome circular (NC_003062)
αr7	gene	AGROH133_02963	R	111988	112422	YP_004277416.1	MarR family transcriptional regulator	Agrobacterium sp. H13-3 chromosome (NC_015183)
αr7	sRNA	AH13r7C	R	112523	112667	-	-	Agrobacterium sp. H13-3 chromosome (NC_015183)
αr7	gene	AGROH133_02965	D	112837	115824	YP_004277417.1	DNA polymerase	Agrobacterium sp. H13-3 chromosome (NC_015183)
αr7	gene	RHECIAT_CH0000189	R	205143	205559	YP_001976363.1	MarR family transcriptional regulator	Rhizobium etli CIAT 652 (NC_010994)
αr7	sRNA	ReCIATr7C	R	205678	205811	-	-	Rhizobium etli CIAT 652 (NC_010994)
αr7	gene	RHECIAT_CH0000190	D	205998	208991	YP_001976364.1	DNA polymerase	Rhizobium etli CIAT 652 (NC_010994)
αr7	gene	Arad_0270	R	242680	243111	YP_002542926.1	MarR family transcriptional regulator	Agrobacterium radiobacter K84 chromosome 1 (NC_011985)
αr7	sRNA	Arr7CI	R	243240	243377	-	-	Agrobacterium radiobacter K84 chromosome 1 (NC_011985)
αr7	gene	Arad_0271	D	243543	246545	YP_002542927.1	DNA polymerase	Agrobacterium radiobacter K84 chromosome 1 (NC_011985)
αr7	gene	Rleg2_4102	R	4279984	4280400	YP_002283590.1	MarR family transcriptional regulator	Rhizobium leguminosarum bv trifolii WSM2304 chromosome (NC_011369)
αr7	sRNA	Rlt2304r7C	R	4280520	4280653	-	-	Rhizobium leguminosarum bv trifolii WSM2304 chromosome (NC_011369)
αr7	gene	Rleg2_4103	D	4280807	4283806	YP_002283591.1	DNA polymerase	Rhizobium leguminosarum bv trifolii WSM2304 chromosome (NC_011369)
αr7	gene	Avi_0299	R	252729	255707	YP_002548197.1	DNA polymerase	Agrobacterium vitis S4 chromosome 1 (NC_011989)
αr7	sRNA	Avr7CI	D	255869	256019	-	-	Agrobacterium vitis S4 chromosome 1 (NC_011989)
αr7	gene	Avi_0300	D	256094	256543	YP_002548198.1	MarR family transcriptional regulator	Agrobacterium vitis S4 chromosome 1 (NC_011989)
αr7	gene	RL0159	R	192083	192499	YP_765764.1	MarR family transcriptional regulator	Rhizobium leguminosarum bv viciae 3841 (NC_008380)
αr7	sRNA	Rlvr7C	R	192620	192753	-	-	Rhizobium leguminosarum bv viciae 3841 (NC_008380)
αr7	gene	RL0160	D	192994	196044	YP_765765.1	DNA polymerase	Rhizobium leguminosarum bv viciae 3841 (NC_008380)
αr7	gene	Rleg_4422	R	4553028	4553444	YP_002978199.1	MarR family transcriptional regulator	Rhizobium leguminosarum bv. trifolii WSM1325 (NC_012850)
αr7	sRNA	Rlt1325r7C	R	4553564	4553697	-	-	Rhizobium leguminosarum bv. trifolii WSM1325 (NC_012850)
αr7	gene	Rleg_4423	D	4553938	4556988	YP_002978200.1	DNA polymerase	Rhizobium leguminosarum bv. trifolii WSM1325 (NC_012850)
αr7	gene	RHE_CH00150	R	163227	163643	YP_467702.1	MarR family transcriptional regulator	Rhizobium etli CFN 42 (NC_007761)
αr7	sRNA	ReCFNr7C	R	163762	163895	-	-	Rhizobium etli CFN 42 (NC_007761)
αr7	gene	RHE_CH00151	D	164051	167050	YP_467703.1	DNA polymerase	Rhizobium etli CFN 42 (NC_007761)
αr7	gene	mll3297	R	2646732	2648117	NP_104434.1	peptidase M2	Mesorhizobium loti MAFF303099 chromosome (NC_002678)
αr7	sRNA	Mlr7C	R	2648243	2648390	-	-	Mesorhizobium loti MAFF303099 chromosome (NC_002678)
αr7	gene	mlr3298	D	2648514	2651525	NP_104435.1	DNA polymerase	Mesorhizobium loti MAFF303099 chromosome (NC_002678)
αr7	gene	Meso_3945	R	4248490	4251426	YP_676477.1	DNA polymerase	Mesorhizobium sp. BNC1 (NC_008254)
αr7	sRNA	MsBNCr7C	D	4251581	4251722	-	-	Mesorhizobium sp. BNC1 (NC_008254)
αr7	gene	Meso_3946	R	4251731	4253149	YP_676478.1	6-phosphogluconate dehydrogenase	Mesorhizobium sp. BNC1 (NC_008254)
αr7	gene	Mesci_1702	R	1778784	1781777	YP_004140907.1	DNA polymerase	Mesorhizobium ciceri biovar biserrulae WSM1271 chromosome (NC_014923)
αr7	sRNA	Mcr7C	D	1781903	1782047	-	-	Mesorhizobium ciceri biovar biserrulae WSM1271 chromosome (NC_014923)
αr7	gene	Mesci_1703	D	1782152	1783537	YP_004140908.1	peptidase M2	Mesorhizobium ciceri biovar biserrulae WSM1271 chromosome (NC_014923)
αr7	gene	BCAN_A0124	R	132964	134379	YP_001591996.1	peptidase M2	Brucella canis ATCC 23365 chromosome I (NC_010103)
αr7	sRNA	Bcr7CI	R	134573	134715	-	-	Brucella canis ATCC 23365 chromosome I (NC_010103)
αr7	gene	BCAN_A0126	D	134940	137879	YP_001591998.1	DNA polymerase	Brucella canis ATCC 23365 chromosome I (NC_010103)
αr7	gene	BSUIS_A0126	R	133299	134714	YP_001626800.1	peptidase M2	Brucella suis ATCC 23445 chromosome I (NC_010169)
αr7	sRNA	Bs23445r7CI	R	134908	135050	-	-	Brucella suis ATCC 23445 chromosome I (NC_010169)
αr7	gene	BSUIS_A0128	D	135275	138211	YP_001626802.1	DNA polymerase	Brucella suis ATCC 23445 chromosome I (NC_010169)
αr7	gene	BMEI1825	R	1865184	1868168	NP_540742.1	DNA polymerase	Brucella melitensis bv. 1 str. 16M chromosome I (NC_003317)
αr7	sRNA	Bm16Mr7CI	D	1868345	1868487	-	-	Brucella melitensis bv. 1 str. 16M chromosome I (NC_003317)
αr7	gene	BMEI1827	D	1868645	1870096	NP_540744.1	peptidase M2	Brucella melitensis bv. 1 str. 16M chromosome I (NC_003317)
αr7	gene	BAbS19_I01130	R	132726	134141	YP_001934145.1	peptidase M2	Brucella abortus S19 chromosome 1 (NC_010742)
αr7	sRNA	BaS19r7CI	R	134335	134477	-	-	Brucella abortus S19 chromosome 1 (NC_010742)
αr7	gene	BAbS19_I01140	D	134702	137638	YP_001934146.1	DNA polymerase	Brucella abortus S19 chromosome 1 (NC_010742)
αr7	gene	BMEA_A0128	R	132946	134361	YP_002731894.1	peptidase M2	Brucella melitensis ATCC 23457 chromosome I (NC_012441)
αr7	sRNA	Bm23457r7CI	R	134555	134697	-	-	Brucella melitensis ATCC 23457 chromosome I (NC_012441)
αr7	gene	BMEA_A0130	D	134922	137858	YP_002731896.1	DNA polymerase	Brucella melitensis ATCC 23457 chromosome I (NC_012441)
αr7	gene	BR0121	R	132981	134396	NP_697162.1	peptidase M2	Brucella suis 1330 chromosome I (NC_004310)
αr7	sRNA	Bs1330r7CI	R	134590	134732	-	-	Brucella suis 1330 chromosome I (NC_004310)
αr7	gene	BR0123	D	134957	137896	NP_697164.1	DNA polymerase	Brucella suis 1330 chromosome I (NC_004310)
αr7	gene	BruAb1_0118	R	134340	135755	YP_220895.1	peptidase M2	Brucella abortus bv. 1 str. 9-941 chromosome I (NC_006932)
αr7	sRNA	Ba19941r7CI	R	135949	136091	-	-	Brucella abortus bv. 1 str. 9-941 chromosome I (NC_006932)
αr7	gene	BruAb1_0120	D	136316	139252	YP_220897.1	DNA polymerase	Brucella abortus bv. 1 str. 9-941 chromosome I (NC_006932)
αr7	gene	BAB1_0118	R	130707	132122	YP_413614.1	peptidase M2	Brucella melitensis biovar Abortus 2308 chromosome I (NC_007618)
αr7	sRNA	Bmar7CI	R	132316	132458	-	-	Brucella melitensis biovar Abortus 2308 chromosome I (NC_007618)
αr7	gene	BAB1_0120	D	132683	135619	YP_413616.1	DNA polymerase	Brucella melitensis biovar Abortus 2308 chromosome I (NC_007618)
αr7	gene	BOV_0118	R	133280	134695	YP_001258159.1	peptidase M2	Brucella ovis ATCC 25840 chromosome I (NC_009505)
αr7	sRNA	Bor7CI	R	134888	135029	-	-	Brucella ovis ATCC 25840 chromosome I (NC_009505)
αr7	gene	BOV_0119	D	135254	138190	YP_001258160.1	DNA polymerase	Brucella ovis ATCC 25840 chromosome I (NC_009505)
αr7	gene	BMI_I124	R	134558	135973	YP_003106091.1	peptidase M2	Brucella microti CCM 4915 chromosome 1 (NC_013119)
αr7	sRNA	Bmir7CI	R	136167	136309	-	-	Brucella microti CCM 4915 chromosome 1 (NC_013119)
αr7	gene	BMI_I126	D	136534	139470	YP_003106093.1	DNA polymerase	Brucella microti CCM 4915 chromosome 1 (NC_013119)
αr7	gene	Oant_0136	R	148306	149715	YP_001368696.1	peptidase M2	Brucella anthropi ATCC 49188 chromosome 1 (NC_009667)
αr7	sRNA	Oar7CI	R	149814	149972	-	-	Brucella anthropi ATCC 49188 chromosome 1 (NC_009667)
αr7	gene	Oant_0137	D	150127	153057	YP_001368697.1	DNA polymerase	Brucella anthropi ATCC 49188 chromosome 1 (NC_009667)

== Data download ==
Covariance Model in stockholm format can be downloaded at gps-tools2.its.yale.edu.
