= Transcription factor binding site databases =

Transcription factors are proteins that bind genomic regulatory sites. Identification of genomic regulatory elements is essential for understanding the dynamics of developmental, physiological and pathological processes. Recent advances in chromatin immunoprecipitation followed by sequencing (ChIP-seq) have provided powerful ways to identify genome-wide profiling of DNA-binding proteins and histone modifications. The application of ChIP-seq methods has reliably discovered transcription factor binding sites and histone modification sites.

== Transcription factor binding site databases ==
Comprehensive List of transcription factor binding sites (TFBSs) databases based on ChIP-seq data as follows:

Name	Description	type	Link	References
ChIPBase	ChIPBase a database for Transcription factor-binding sites, motifs (~1290 transcription factors) and decoding the transcriptional regulation of LncRNAs, miRNAs and protein-coding genes from ~10,200 curated peak datasets derived from ChIP-seq methods in 10 species	database	website	
ChEA	transcription factor regulation inferred from integrating genome-wide ChIP-X experiments.	database	website	
CIS-BP	collection of transcription factor binding sites models inferred by binding domains.	database	website	
CistromeMap	a knowledgebase and web server for ChIP-Seq and DNase-Seq studies in mouse and human.	database	website	
CTCFBSDB	a database for CTCF binding sites and genome organization	database	website	
Factorbook	a Wiki-based database for transcription factor-binding data generated by the ENCODE consortium.	database	website	
hmChIP	a database and web server for exploring publicly available human and mouse ChIP-seq and ChIP-chip data.	database	website	
HOCOMOCO	a comprehensive collection of human and mouse transcription factor binding sites models.	database	website	
JASPAR	The JASPAR CORE database contains a curated, non-redundant set of profiles, derived from published collections of experimentally defined transcription factor binding sites for eukaryotes.	database	website	
MethMotif	An integrative cell-specific database of transcription factor binding motifs coupled with DNA methylation profiles.	database	website	
SwissRegulon	a database of genome-wide annotations of regulatory sites.	database	website	
TFLink	TFLink gateway provides comprehensive and highly accurate information on transcription factor - target gene interactions, nucleotide sequences and genomic locations of transcription factor binding sites for human and six model organisms.	database	website	
TRANSFAC	A long-standing curated database of regulatory sites, enhancers, binding site predictions, PSSMs and related analytical software.	database	website	
