= TRANSFAC =

Database of eukaryotic transcription factors

Content
- Description: Transcription Factor Database
- Data types captured: Eukaryotic transcription factors, their binding sites and binding profiles
- Organisms: eukaryotes

Contact
- Research center: Helmholtz Centre for Infection Research; BIOBASE GmbH; geneXplain GmbH
- Primary citation: Wingender (2008)
- Release date: 1988

Access
- Website: TRANSFAC 7.0 Public 2005

TRANSFAC (TRANScription FACtor database) is a manually curated database of eukaryotic transcription factors, their genomic binding sites and DNA binding profiles. The contents of the database can be used to predict potential transcription factor binding sites.

== Introduction ==
The origin of the database was an early data collection published 1988. The first version that was released under the name TRANSFAC was developed at the former German National Research Centre for Biotechnology and designed for local installation (now: Helmholtz Centre for Infection Research). In one of the first publicly funded bioinformatics projects, launched in 1993, TRANSFAC developed into a resource that became available on the Internet.

In 1997, TRANSFAC was transferred to a newly established company, BIOBASE, in order to secure long-term financing of the database. Since then, the most up-to-date version has to be licensed, whereas older versions are free for non-commercial users. Since July 2016, TRANSFAC is maintained and distributed by geneXplain GmbH, Wolfenbüttel, Germany.

== Content and features ==
The content of the database is organized in a way that it is centered around the interaction between transcription factors (TFs) and their DNA binding sites (TFBS). TFs are described with regard to their structural and functional features, extracted from the original scientific literature. They are classified to families, classes and superclasses according to the features of their DNA binding domains.

Binding of a TF to a genomic site is documented by specifying the localization of the site, its sequence and the experimental method applied. All sites that refer to one TF, or a group of closely related TFs, are aligned and used to construct a position-specific scoring matrix (PSSM), or count matrix. Many matrices of the TRANSFAC matrix library have been constructed by a team of curators, others were taken from scientific publications.

== Applications ==
The TRANSFAC database can be used as an encyclopedia of eukaryotic transcription factors. The target sequences and the regulated genes can be listed for each TF, which can be used as benchmark for TFBS recognition tools or as training sets for new transcription factor binding sites (TFBS) recognition algorithms. The TF classification enables to analyze such data sets with regard to the properties of the DNA-binding domains. Another application is to retrieve all TFs that regulate a given (set of) gene(s). In the context of systems-biological studies, the TF-target gene relations documented in TRANSFAC were used to construct and analyze transcription regulatory networks. By far the most frequent use of TRANSFAC is the computational prediction of potential TFBS. A number of algorithms exist which either use the individual binding sites or the matrix library for this purpose:

- Patch – analyzes sequence similarities with the binding sites documented in TRANSFAC; it is provided along with the database.
- SiteSeer – analyzes sequence similarities with the binding sites documented in TRANSFAC.
- Match – identifies potential TFBS using the matrix library; it is provided along with the database.
- TESS (Transcription Element Search System) – analyzes sequence similarities with binding sites of TRANSFAC as well as potential binding sites using the matrix libraries of TRANSFAC and three other sources. TESS also provides a program for the identification of cis-regulatory modules (CRMs, characteristic combinations of TFBSs), which uses TRANSFAC matrices.
- PROMO – matrix-based prediction of TFBSs with aid of the commercial database version
- TFM Explorer – Identification of common potential TFBSs in a set of genes
- MotifMogul – matrix-based sequence analysis with a number of different algorithms
- ConTra – matrix-based sequence analysis in conserved promoter regions
- PMS (Poly Matrix Search) – matrix-based sequence analysis in conserved promoter regions

Comparison of matrices with the matrix library of TRANSFAC and other sources:

- T-Reg Comparator to compare individual or groups of matrices with those of TRANSFAC or other libraries.
- MACO (Poly Matrix Search) – matrix comparison with matrix libraries.

A number of servers provide genomic annotations computed with the aid of TRANSFAC. Others have used such analyses to infer target gene sets.

== See also ==
- Transcription factor binding site databases
