= Αr35 RNA =

αr35 is a family of bacterial small non-coding RNAs with representatives in a reduced group of Alphaproteobacteria from the order Hyphomicrobiales. The first member of this family (Smr35B) was found in a Sinorhizobium meliloti 1021 locus located in the symbiotic plasmid B (pSymB). Further homology and structure conservation analysis have identified full-length SmrB35 homologs in other legume symbionts (i.e. Rhizobium leguminosarum bv.viciae, R. leguminosarum bv. trifolii and R. etli), as well as in the human and plant pathogens Brucella anthropi and Agrobacterium tumefaciens, respectively. αr35 RNA species are 139-142 nt long (Table 1) and share a common secondary structure consisting of two stem loops and a well conserved rho independent terminator (Figure 1, 2, 3). Most of the αr35 transcripts can be catalogued as trans-acting sRNAs expressed from well-defined promoter regions of independent transcription units within intergenic regions of the Alphaproteobacterial genomes (Figure 5).

== Discovery and Structure ==
Smr35B sRNA was firstly described by del Val et al., as a result of a computational comparative genomic approach in the intergenic regions (IGRs) of the reference S. meliloti 1021 strain. Northern hybridization experiments confirmed that the predicted smr35B locus did express a single transcript of the expected size, which accumulated differentially in free-living and endosymbiotic bacteria. TAP-based 5'-RACE experiments mapped the transcription start site (TSS) of the full-length Smr35B transcript to the 577,730 nt position in the S. meliloti 1021 genome (http://iant.toulouse.inra.fr/bacteria/annotation/cgi/rhime.cgi) whereas the 3'-end was assumed to be located at the 577,868 nt position matching the last residue of the consecutive stretch of Us of a bona fide Rho-independent terminator (Figure 5). Recent deep sequencing-based characterization of the small RNA fraction (50-350 nt) of S. meliloti further confirmed the expression of Smr35B (here referred to as SmelB053), and mapped the 5'- and 3'-ends of the molecule to the positions proposed earlier.

The nucleotide sequence of Smr35B was initially used as query to search against the Rfam database. This homology search rendered no matches to known bacterial sRNA in this database. Smr35B was next BLASTed with default parameters against all the currently available bacterial genomes (1,615 sequences at 20 April 2011; https://www.ncbi.nlm.nih.gov;). The regions exhibiting significant homology to the query sequence (78-89% similarity) were extracted to create a Covariance Model (CM) from a seed alignment using Infernal (version1.0) (Figure 2).

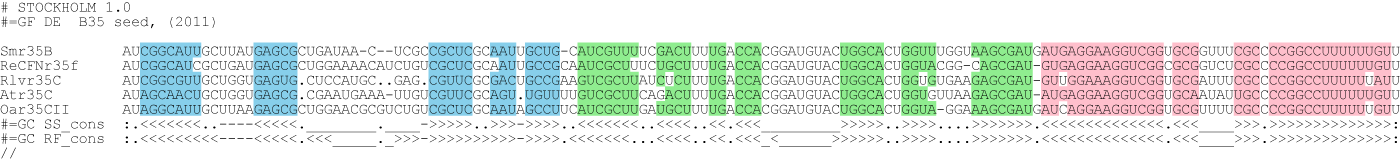
Figure 1: Covariance Model in Stockholm format showing the consensus structure for the αr35 family. Each of the stems represented by the structure line #=GC SS_cons is in a different color, corresponding the red one to the rho independent terminator stem. Covariance Model in Stockholm format can be downloaded here.

This CM was used in a further search for new members of the αr35 family in the existing bacterial genomic databases.

Table 1: Smr35B homologs in other symbionts and pathogens
CM model	Name	GI accession number	begin	end	strand	%GC	length	Organism
αr35	Smr35B	gi|16263748|ref|NC_003078.1|	577730	577868	+	52	139	Sinorhizobium meliloti 1021 plasmid pSymB
αr35	Atr35C	gi|159185562|ref|NC_003063.2|	132595	132733	+	48	139	Agrobacterium tumefaciens str. C58 chromosome linear
αr35	Rlvr35C	gi|116249766|ref|NC_008380.1|	2256716	2256853	+	55	138	Rhizobium leguminosarum bv. viciae 3841
αr35	Rlt1325r35p04	gi|241258599|ref|NC_012852.1|	114247	114385	-	56	139	Rhizobium leguminosarum bv. trifolii WSM1325 plasmid pR132504
αr35	Rlt1325r35p02	gi|241666492|ref|NC_012858.1|	466255	466394	-	?	140	Rhizobium leguminosarum bv. trifolii WSM1325 plasmid pR132502
αr35	ReCFNr35f	gi|86360734|ref|NC_007766.1|	136368	136508	+	57	141	Rhizobium etli CFN 42 plasmid p42f
αr35	Oar35CII	gi|153010078|ref|NC_009668.1|	1587138	1587279	-	52	142	Brucella anthropi ATCC 49188 chromosome 2

The results were manually inspected to deduce a consensus secondary structure for the family (Figure 1 and Figure 2). The consensus structure was also independently predicted with the program locARNATE with very similar predictions. The manual inspection of the 84 sequences found with the CM using Infernal allowed finding seven true homolog sequences: two copies in Rhizobium leguminosarum bv. viciae (chromosome and plasmid pRL11), two copies in Rhizobium leguminosarumbv. trifolii WSM1325 (plasmid pR132504 and plasmid pR132502), in Rhizobium etli CFN 42 plasmid p42f and in the chromosomes of Agrobacterium tumefaciens and Brucella anthropi. All these sequences showed significant Infernal E-values (1.38e-33 – 1.05e-11) and bit-scores. In the case of S. meliloti a second copy was identified in the symbiotic plasmid pSymB (574630-574766) with a significant E-value (3.73e-07) but no expression has been detected under any of the tested conditions (unpublished data). The rest of the sequences found with the model showed high E-values between (8.76e-12 and 1.e-3) but very low bit-scores, which usually is a sign of a remote homologue. However, a manual inspection of these cases showed that the rho independent terminator and the second stem were the only conserved regions, failing the first stem. This two stem arregment construction was largely extended in all the Alphaproteobacteria, being specially conserved in Brucella species.

Figure 2: Consensus secondary structure of the αr35 members used in the Covariance Model predicted by RNAalifold. The coloring scheme for the αr35 family structure is based on base pairs conservation: Red: base pair occurring in all sequences used to generate the consensus; yellow: two types of base pairing occur; Green: three types of base pairing occur. The shading of base pairs represents: Saturated, no inconsistent sequences; Pale, one inconsistent sequence; Very pale, two inconsistent sequences.

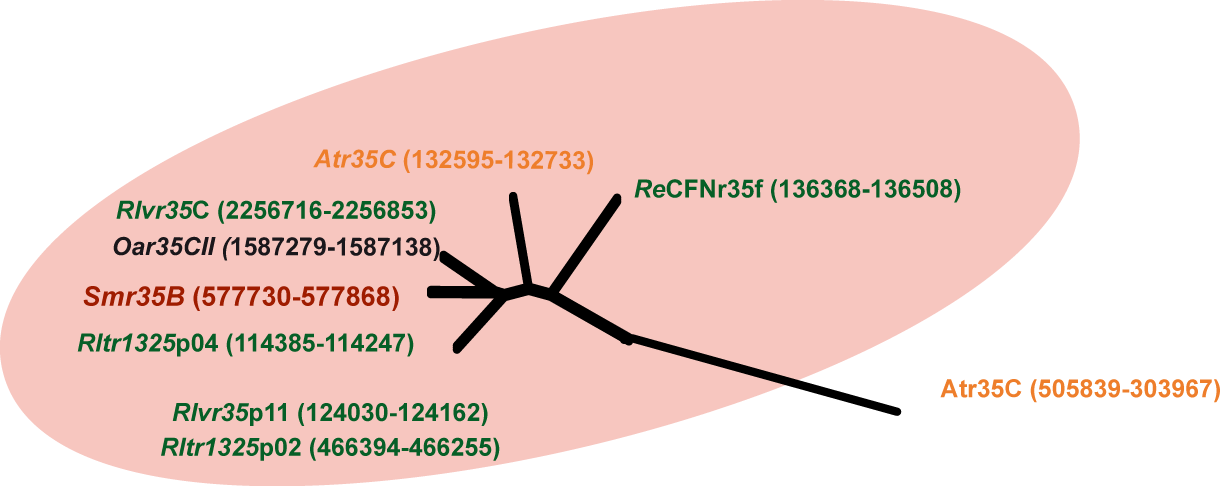
Figure 3: Phylogenetic distribution of known and predicted αr35 genes. Gene numbers are based on computational analysis using the program Infernal. Legend: Smr35B = Sinorhizobium meliloti 1021 plasmid pSymB (NC_003078), Atr35C = Agrobacterium tumefaciens str. C58 chromosome linear (NC_003063), Rlvr35C = Rhizobium leguminosarum bv. viciae 3841 (NC_008380), Rlt1325r35p04 = Rhizobium leguminosarum bv. trifolii WSM1325 plasmid pR132504 (NC_012852), Rlt1325r35p02 = Rhizobium leguminosarum bv. trifolii WSM1325 plasmid pR132502 (NC_012858), ReCFNr35f = Rhizobium etli CFN 42 plasmid p42f (NC_007766), Oar35CII = Brucella anthropi ATCC 49188 chromosome 2 (NC_009668), Rlvr35p11 = Rhizobium leguminosarum bv. viciae 3841 plasmid pRL11 (NC_008384).

== Expression information ==
Smr35B expression was first assessed by del Val et al. in S. meliloti 1021 under different biological conditions; i.e. bacterial growth in TY, minimal medium (MM) and luteolin-MM broth and endosymbiotic bacteria (i.e. mature symbiotic alfalfa nodules). Expression of Smr35B in free-living bacteria was found to be growth-dependent, being the gene down-regulated when bacteria entered the stationary phase. Supplementation of MM with luteolin, the plant flavone that specifically induces transcription of the S. meliloti nodulation genes, stimulated the expression of Smr35B by ~4 fold. In contrast, the Smr35B transcript was not detected in mature nodule tissues. Schlüter et al. further described up-regulation of Smr35B upon an osmotic upshift.

== Promoter Analysis ==
All αr35 loci have recognizable σ^{70}-dependent promoters showing a -35/-10 consensus motif CTTAGAC-n17-CTATAT previously shown to be widely conserved among several other genera in the Alphaproteobacteria. To identify binding sites for other known transcription factors we used the fasta sequences provided by RegPredict(http://regpredict.lbl.gov/regpredict/help.html), and used those position weight matrices (PSWM) provided by RegulonDB (http://regulondb.ccg.unam.mx). We built PSWM for each transcription factor from the RegPredict sequences using the Consensus/Patser program, choosing the best final matrix for motif lengths between 14 and 30 bps if the corresponding length had not been previously specified (see "Consensus matrices" threshold (average E-value < 10E-10) for each matrix was established (see "Thresholded consensus" in http://gps-tools2.its.yale.edu). Moreover, we searched for conserved unknown motifs using MEME (http://meme.sdsc.edu/meme4_6_1/intro.html) and used relaxed regular expressions (i.e. pattern matching) over all Smr35B homologs promoters. Only an inverted repeat structure built around the motif T-N11-A was found 55 nt upstream of the transcription start site of SmrB35 in S. meliloti which is a degenerated motif of the known conserved nod boxes (Figure 4). This characteristic sequence has been proposed as the specific binding site for the LysR-type proteins. All promoter regions of the seed SmrB35 homologs presented the motif as well.

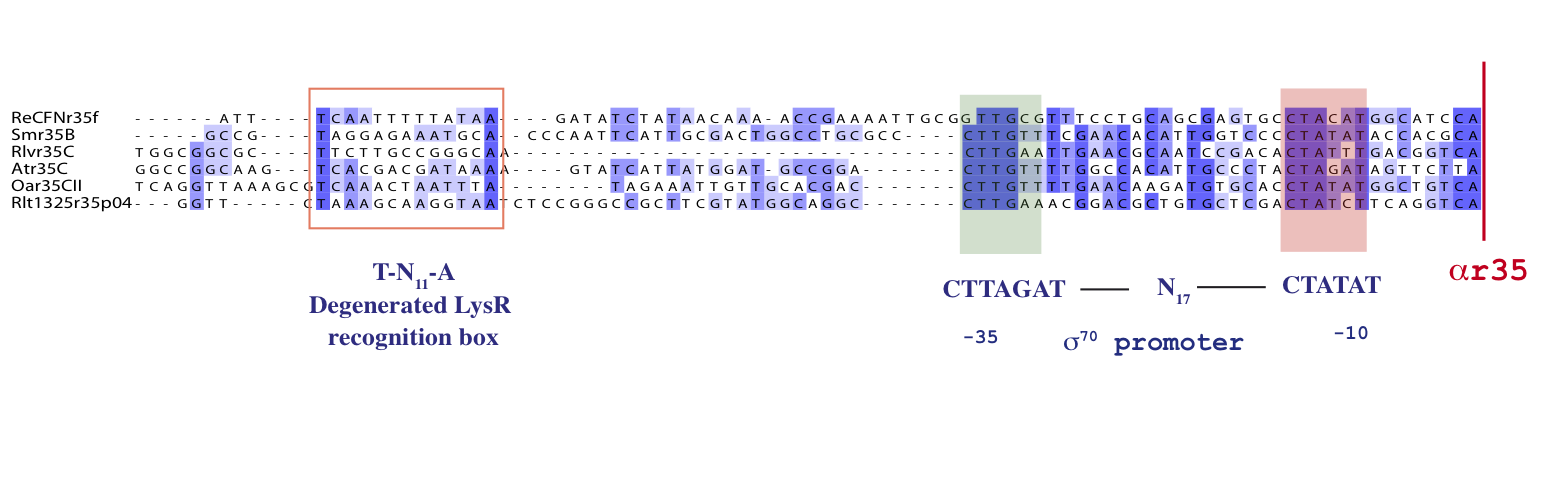
Figure 4: Graphic representation of the αr35 seed members' promoter region. All members presented putative σ^{70} promoters with -35 and -10 boxes marked in green and red respectively. The degenerated LysR recognition box is marked in blue.

== Genomic Context ==
Most of the members of the αr35 family are trans-encoded sRNAs transcribed from independent promoters in the IGRs of the rhizobial megaplasmids. Exceptions are SmrB35 homologs of R. leguminosarum bv. viciae (Rlvr35C), and R. etli CFN 42 plasmid p42f (ReCFNr35f), which are encoded in the opposite strand of annotated genes, partially overlapping ORFs. The predicted protein products of these overlapping ORFs could not be assigned to any functional category on the basis of the amino acid sequence homology. Thus, these αr35 members are putative cis-encoded antisense sRNAs. The genomic regions of the trans-encoded αr35 sRNAs exhibit partial conservation mainly limited to the sRNA-coding sequence and one flanking gene. Most of the flanking genes of the αr35 loci encode transcription factors and proteins related to nitrogen and glutamine metabolism.

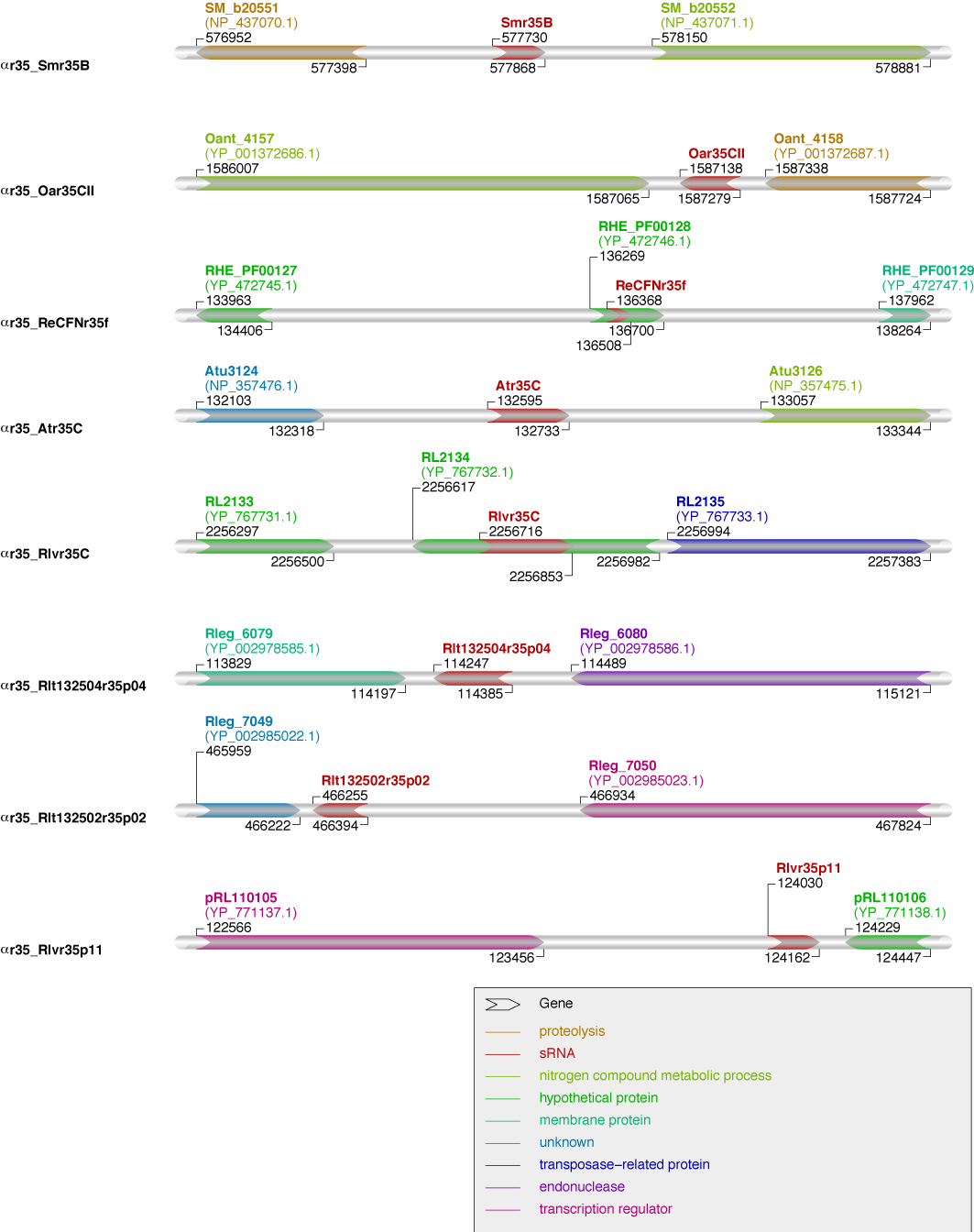
Figure 5: Genomic context scheme of Smr35B and its closest homologues in other organisms. The αr35 RNA genes are represented by red arrows and the flanking ORFs by arrows on different colors depending on their product function (legend). Numbers indicate the αr35 RNA gene's and flanking ORFs coordinates in each organism genome database. The gene strand is represented with the file direction. On the left of the figure identification names are used which correspond to a certain organism: αr35_Smr35B = Sinorhizobium meliloti 1021 plasmid pSymB (NC_003078), αr35_Oar35CII = Brucella anthropi ATCC 49188 chromosome 2 (NC_009668), αr35_ReCFNr35f = Rhizobium etli CFN 42 plasmid p42f (NC_007766), αr35_Atr35C = Agrobacterium tumefaciens str. C58 chromosome linear (NC_003063), αr35_Rlvr35C = Rhizobium leguminosarum bv. viciae 3841 (NC_008384), αr35_Rlt1325r35p02 = Rhizobium leguminosarum trifolii WSM1325 plasmid pR132502 (NC_012858), Rlt1325r35p04 = Rhizobium leguminosarum bv. trifolii WSM1325 plasmid pR132504 (NC_012852), αr35_Rlvr35p11 = Rhizobium leguminosarum bv. viciae 3841 plasmid pRL11 (NC_008384).

Table 2: Detailed Genomic context information of the α35 sRNA seed members.
Family	Feature	Name	Strand	Begin	End	Protein name	Annotation	Organism
αr35	gene	SM_b20551	R	576952	577398	NP_437070.1	proteolysis	Sinorhizobium meliloti 1021 plasmid pSymB (NC_003078)
αr35	sRNA	Smr35B	D	577730	577868			Sinorhizobium meliloti 1021 plasmid pSymB (NC_003078)
αr35	gene	SM_b20552	D	578150	578881	NP_437071.1	nitrogen compound metabolic process	Sinorhizobium meliloti 1021 plasmid pSymB (NC_003078)
αr35	gene	Oant_4157	D	1586007	1587065	YP_001372686.1	nitrogen compound metabolic process	Brucella anthropi ATCC 49188 chromosome 2 (NC_009668)
αr35	sRNA	Oar35CII	R	1587138	1587279			Brucella anthropi ATCC 49188 chromosome 2 (NC_009668)
αr35	gene	Oant_4158	R	1587338	1587724	YP_001372687.1	proteolysis	Brucella anthropi ATCC 49188 chromosome 2 (NC_009668)
αr35	gene	RHE_PF00127	R	133963	134406	YP_472745.1	hypothetical protein	Rhizobium etli CFN 42 plasmid p42f (NC_007766)
αr35	gene	RHE_PF00128	D	136269	136700	YP_472746.1	hypothetical protein	Rhizobium etli CFN 42 plasmid p42f (NC_007766)
αr35	sRNA	ReCFNr35f	D	136368	136508			Rhizobium etli CFN 42 plasmid p42f (NC_007766)
αr35	gene	RHE_PF00129	D	137962	138264	YP_472747.1	membrane protein	Rhizobium etli CFN 42 plasmid p42f (NC_007766)
αr35	gene	Atu3124	D	132103	132318	NP_357476.1		Agrobacterium tumefaciens str. C58 chromosome linear (NC_003063)
αr35	sRNA	Atr35C	D	132595	132733			Agrobacterium tumefaciens str. C58 chromosome linear (NC_003063)
αr35	gene	Atu3126	D	133057	133344	NP_357475.1	nitrogen compound metabolic process	Agrobacterium tumefaciens str. C58 chromosome linear (NC_003063)
αr35	gene	RL2133	D	2256297	2256500	YP_767731.1	hypothetical protein	Rhizobium leguminosarum bv. viciae 3841 (NC_008380)
αr35	gene	RL2134	R	2256617	2256982	YP_767732.1	hyphotetical protein	Rhizobium leguminosarum bv. viciae 3841 (NC_008380)
αr35	sRNA	Rlvr35C	D	2256716	2256853			Rhizobium leguminosarum bv. viciae 3841 (NC_008380)
αr35	gene	RL2135	D	2256994	2257383	YP_767733.1	transposase-related protein	Rhizobium leguminosarum bv. viciae 3841 (NC_008380)
αr35	gene	Rleg_6079	D	113829	114197	YP_002978585.1	membrane protein	Rhizobium leguminosarum trifolii WSM1325 plasmid pR132502 (NC_012852)
αr35	sRNA	Rlt132504r35p04	R	114247	114385			Rhizobium leguminosarum trifolii WSM1325 plasmid pR132502 (NC_012852)
αr35	gene	Rleg_6080	R	114489	115121	YP_002978586.1	endonuclease	Rhizobium leguminosarum trifolii WSM1325 plasmid pR132502 (NC_012852)
αr35	gene	Rleg_7049	D	465959	466222	YP_002985022.1		Rhizobium leguminosarum trifolii WSM1325 plasmid pR132504 (NC_012858)
αr35	sRNA	Rlt132502r35p02	R	466255	466394			Rhizobium leguminosarum trifolii WSM1325 plasmid pR132504 (NC_012858)
αr35	gene	Rleg_7050	R	466934	467824	YP_002985023.1	transcription regulator	Rhizobium leguminosarum trifolii WSM1325 plasmid pR132504 (NC_012858)
αr35	gene	pRL110105	D	122566	123456	YP_771137.1	transcription regulator	Rhizobium leguminosarum bv. viciae 3841 plasmid pRL11 (NC_008384)
αr35	sRNA	Rlvr35p11	D	124030	124162			Rhizobium leguminosarum bv. viciae 3841 plasmid pRL11 (NC_008384)
αr35	gene	pRL110106	R	124229	124447	YP_771138.1	hyphotetical protein	Rhizobium leguminosarum bv. viciae 3841 plasmid pRL11 (NC_008384)
