= Biobase (company) =

International bioinformatics company

BIOBASE GmbH
- Type: Private
- Industry: Bioinformatics databases
- Founded: Wolfenbuettel, Germany (1997)
- Headquarters: Wolfenbuettel, Germany
- Key people: Michael Tysiak (CEO & CFO), Dr. Frank Schacherer (CTO)
- Products: BIOBASE Knowledge Library, TRANSFAC, Proteome databases, ExPlain,
- Services: Knowledge process outsourcing, custom curation, ExPlain analysis
- Number of employees: ~150 (2008)
- Website: www.biobase-international.com

BIOBASE is an international bioinformatics company headquartered in Wolfenbüttel, Germany. The company focuses on the generation, maintenance, and licensing of databases in the field of molecular biology, and their related software platforms.

== History ==
The company was founded in 1997 as a spin-off from the German Research Centre for Biotechnology (GBF), Braunschweig, Germany, known today as the Helmholtz Research Centre for Infection Research. *The founders were scientists of the GBF Research Group Bioinformatics, headed at that time by Edgar Wingender. The company is now managed by Michael Tysiak (CEO/CFO) and Frank Schacherer (COO).

The company's original product was the TRANSFAC database, a platform for the description and analysis of gene regulatory events and networks. This was subsequently complemented by a number of smaller databases relevant to aspects of gene regulation, and by an early signaling pathway database (TRANSPATH). TRANSPATH constituted the earliest signaling pathway database, alongside the Cell Signaling Network Database (CSNDB) curated by T. Takai at the National Institute of Health Sciences (NIHS) in Tokyo.

By end of 1999, BIOBASE acquired venture capital from the IMH funds, now managed by Triginta Capital, by the MBG (Hannover; until 2007) and the tbg. In 2002, Intec W&G, Tokyo, Japan, invested in the company and remained a shareholder until 2005. In early 2005, the company acquired the databases produced by Incyte, Wilmington, Delaware, USA, which were operated at the time by Incyte's subsidiary, Proteome Inc in Beverly, MA. The early flagship of Proteome was the Yeast Proteome Database (YPD), which was complemented by a number of similar databases. Their latest achievement before the acquisition was the Human Proteome Survey Database (HumanPSD).

BIOBASE with all subsidiaries was acquired by QIAGEN GmbH on April 2, 2014.

== Subsidiaries ==
BIOBASE GmbH has three fully owned daughter companies: BIOBASE Corporation in Beverly/Massachusetts, USA (since 2005), BIOBASE Databases India Pvt Ltd. in Bangalore, India (since 2006), and BIOBASE Japan K.K. in Yokohama, Japan (since 2007).

== Products and services ==
The company's databases provide manually curated content, collected and structured from peer-reviewed scientific primary publications.

The BIOBASE Knowledge Library (BKL) is an integrated database comprising the following modules:

- TRANSFAC: Eukaryotic transcription factors, their genomic DNA-binding sites and DNA-binding profiles
- TRANSCompel: Transcription regulating composite elements
- TRANSPro: Promoter sequences from a number of selected eukaryotic species
- PathoDB: Pathologically relevant mutations in transcription factors and their binding sites
- TRANSPATH: Signal transduction and metabolic pathways in mammalian species
- YPD: The complete yeast proteome (protein reports for all known Saccharomyces cerevisiae proteins)
- PombePD, MycopathPD: Proteomes of Schizosaccharomyces pombe and of pathological fungi
- WormPD: The proteome of Caenorhabditis elegans
- HumanPSD: The proteomes of human, mouse and rat [8]
- GPCR-PD: G-protein coupled receptor reports

In addition, BIOBASE has developed the ExPlain system for the biological interpretation of gene expression and proteomics data by integrated functional, promoter and pathway analysis.

The "Gene Regulation Portal" offers a number of earlier revisions of company products free of charge to users from non-profit organizations.

A number of third-party products are also distributed by BIOBASE:

- S/MARt DB: Scaffold/matrix attached regions (HZI Braunschweig)
- BRENDA: The BRaunschweig ENzyme DAtabase (Technical University Braunschweig Enzymeta)
- HGMD: The Human Gene Mutation Database (Cardiff University)
- CI: Cell Illustrator for pathway simulations (Tokyo University/GNI, Tokyo)

In addition to these products, BIOBASE offers Knowledge process outsourcing (KPO) services. These may comprise the development and population of customized databases with specific contents, or systematic analyses of gene expression data.

== Scientific projects/research ==
BIOBASE is a member of the following publicly funded research consortia, the first two of them being coordinated by BIOBASE (Alexander Kel):

- Net2Drug: Integrated Labwork, Bio- and Cheminformatics technology for fighting breast cancer (9 partners; funded under EU6) https://web.archive.org/web/20110111035825/http://www.biobase.de/pages/index.php?id=437
- Sysco: Combined experimental, bioinformatics and simulation approaches to analyze intracellular parasitism (8 partners; funded under EU6)
- TRANSISTOR: Bioinformatics modeling of plant regulatory circuits (7 partners; Marie-Curie Project funded under EU6)
- Valapodyn: Dynamic modeling of data on brain pathologies (7 partners; funded under EU6)
- Eurodia: Potential targets for prevention and treatment of dysfunctional insulin secretion in type 2 diabetes (20 partners; funded under EU6)
- Gen2Phen: Unified genotype-phenotype database (19 partners; funded under EU7)
- LipidomicNet: Identification of targets for and biomarkers of energy overload diseases through lipid protein interactions (21 partners; funded under EU7);
- GlobCell: Global scale analysis and prediction of human cellular behaviour in a complex environment (4 partners; funded by Eurotrans-Bio, ETB).
- TCellTalk: (3 partners; funded by German Ministry of Research in the Forsys partnering program)

In addition, BIOBASE has entered research partnerships with

- University Medicine of Georg August University of Göttingen, Göttingen, Germany (E. Wingender);
- University of Tokyo, Tokyo, Japan (S. Miyano);
- Windber Research Institute & Strategic Medicine, Inc, Windber/PA, USA (M. Liebman);
- Fraunhofer Institute of Toxicology and Experimental Medicine, Hannover, Germany;
- Lawrence Berkeley National Laboratory, Berkeley/CA, USA (I. Dubchak)

== See also ==
- Gene expression
- Bioinformatics
- Bioinformatics companies
