= HOCOMOCO =

Database of human and mouse transcription factor binding sites

Content
- Description: Curated collection of binding models for human and mouse transcription factors
- Data types captured: Transcription factor binding profiles
- Organisms: Homo sapiens, Mus musculus laboratory: autosome.org author: Vorontsov, Makeev, Kulakovskiy

Contact
- Primary citation: Vorontsov et al

Access
- Website: HOCOMOCO

HOCOMOCO is an open-access database providing curated and benchmarked binding motifs of human and mouse transcription factors. It captures the following data types: Homo sapiens (human) and Mus musculus (mouse) transcription factors, their DNA binding site motifs, and motif subtypes.

== Introduction ==
Transcription factors (TFs) are proteins that bind DNA and thus regulate the transcription process. The binding is sequence-specific. A sequence motif is a model that describes the common pattern of the DNA binding sites that a particular TF prefers to bind. One of the possible representations of the model is the Position-Weight Matrix (PWM).

== Organisms ==
- Homo sapiens
- Mus musculus

== Recognition ==
According to the Web of Science, the 2018 publication of HOCOMOCO has been cited 396 times (as of January 2024). The publications have been cited 144 and 151 times.

== See also ==
- Transcription factor binding site databases
