= CollecTF =

Database of transcription factor binding sites

Content
- Description: database of experimentally validated TF-binding sites
- Organisms: bacteria

Contact
- Authors: Kılıç, et al. (2014)
- Primary citation: PMID 24234444
- Release date: 2013

Access
- Data format: FASTA, CSV, ARFF
- Website: collectf.org compbio.umbc.edu
- Download URL

CollecTF is a database of transcription factor binding sites in the Bacteria domain.

CollecTF compiles only experimentally validated TF-binding sites. This is accomplished through the manual curation of peer-reviewed literature with a special focus on the experimental process used to identify TF-binding sites.

CollecTF entries are periodically submitted to NCBI for integration into RefSeq complete genome records as link-out features, maximizing the visibility of the data and enriching the annotation of RefSeq files with regulatory information. Seeking to facilitate comparative genomics and machine-learning analyses of regulatory interactions, in its initial release CollecTF provides domain-wide coverage of two TF families (LexA and Fur), as well as extensive representation for a clinically important bacterial family, the Vibrionaceae.
