= AnimalTFDB =

Animal transcription factor database

Content
- Description: animal transcription factor database.

Contact
- Research center: Huazhong University of Science and Technology
- Laboratory: Hubei Bioinformatics & Molecular Imaging Key Laboratory
- Authors: Hong-Mei Zhang
- Primary citation: Zhang & al. (2012)
- Release date: 2011

Access
- Website: www.bioguo.org/AnimalTFDB/

AnimalTFDB is a comprehensive database of transcription factors.

== See also ==
- transcription factors
