= RegTransBase =

Biological database

Content
- Description: regulatory sequences and interactions
- Organisms: prokaryotes

Contact
- Primary citation: Kazakov & al. (2007)
- Release date: 2006

Access
- Website: http://regtransbase.lbl.gov

RegTransBase is database of regulatory interactions and transcription factor binding sites in prokaryotes

== See also ==
- Transcription factors
