= RegulonDB =

Content
- Description: Transcriptional regulation of Escherichia coli K-12
- Organisms: Escherichia coli K-12

Contact
- Research center: Centro de Ciencias Genómicas, Universidad Nacional Autónoma de México
- Authors: Gama-Castro et al.
- Primary citation: Gama-Castro et al. (2015)
- Release date: 2017

Access
- Website: RegulonDB

Miscellaneous
- Version: 9.4

RegulonDB is a database of the regulatory network of gene expression in Escherichia coli K-12. RegulonDB also models the organization of the genes in transcription units, operons and regulons. A total of 120 sRNAs with 231 total interactions which all together regulate 192 genes are also included. RegulonDB was founded in 1998 and also contributes data to the EcoCyc database.

== Transcription factors and sensory-response units ==
In bacteria, such as E. coli, genes, are regulated by sequence elements in promoters and related binding sites). RegulonDB provides a database of such regulatory elements, their binding sites and the transcription factors that bind to these sites in E. coli. RegulonDB 9.0 includes 184 experimentally determined transcription factors (TFs) as well as 120 computationally predicted TFs, that is, a total of 304.

The complete repertoire of 189 genetic sensory-response units (GENSOR units) are reported, integrating their signal, regulatory interactions, and metabolic pathways. A total of 78 GENSOR units have their four components highlighted; 119 include the genetic switch and the response, and 2 contain only the genetic switch.

A total of 103 TFs have a known effector in RegulonDB, including 25 two-component systems. There were enough sites to build a motif for 93 TFs to infer 16,207 predicted TF binding sites. This set of predicted binding sites corresponds to 12,574 TF → gene regulatory interactions; this represents a recovery of 52% of the 1592 annotated regulatory interactions in the database for the 93 TFs for which RegulonDB has a position-weight matrix (PWM). If only TFs with a good-quality PWM are taken into account, the total number of predicted TF → gene interactions is 8,714, recovering 672 (57%) of annotated interactions for this TF subset. Semi-automatic curation produced a total of 3,195 regulatory interactions for 199 TFs.

== Definitions ==
Check the glossary for all definitions.

=== Transcription unit (TU) ===
A transcription unit is a set of one or more genes transcribed from a single promoter. A TU may also include regulatory protein binding sites affecting this promoter and a terminator. A complex operon with several promoters contains, therefore, several transcription units. A transcription unit must include all the genes in an operon.

=== Promoters and terminators ===
A promoter is defined in RegulonDB as the nucleotide sequence 60 bases upstream and 20 downstream from the precise initiation of transcription or +1. Terminators are regions where transcription ends, and RNA Polymerase unbinds from DNA.

=== Binding site ===
The TFs binding sites are physical DNA sites recognized by transcription factors within a genome, including enhancer, upstream activator (UAS) and operator sites that may bind repressors or activators.

=== Graphic display in RegulonDB ===
The graphic display of an operon contains all the genes of its different transcription units, as well as all the regulatory elements involved in the transcription and regulation of those TUs. An operon is here conceived as a structural unit encompassing all genes and regulatory elements. An operon with several promoters located near each other may also have dual binding sites, indicating that such a site can activate one particular promoter, but repress a second one. In the same page, the collection of the different TUs is displayed below the operon. The graphic display of an operon contains all the genes of its different transcription units, as well as all the regulatory elements involved in the transcription and regulation of those TUs. The graphic display of a TU will always contain only one promoter -when known- with the binding sites that regulate its activity, followed by the transcribed genes. Note that dual sites are frequently displayed at a TU as repressors or activators. This is because the site will have a particular effect on the promoter of that TU.
