= Brucella intermedia =

Scientific classification
- Domain: Bacteria
- Kingdom: Pseudomonadati
- Phylum: Pseudomonadota
- Class: Alphaproteobacteria
- Order: Hyphomicrobiales
- Family: Brucellaceae
- Genus: Brucella
- Species: B. intermedia

Binomial name
- Brucella intermedia (Velasco et al. 1998) Hördt et al. 2020

Type strain
- BCRC 17247, CCM 7179, CCRC 17247, CCUG 24694, CIP 105838, CL 350/83, CNS 2-75, DSM 17986, IFO 15820, LMG 3301, NBRC 15820, NCTC 12171, VTT E-991166

Synonyms
- Ochrobactrum intermedium Velasco et al. 1998

Species of bacterium

Brucella intermedia is a bacterium from the genus of Brucella. It was first described by Velasco and others in 1998. It causes diseases in humans only rarely, with single case reports of cholangitis following liver transplantation, bacteremia in a patient with bladder cancer, a pelvic abscess after abdominal surgery, dyspepsia, endophthalmitis in the presence of a foreign body, pneumonia, and endocarditis.

B. intermedia, B. anthropi, and Brucella melitensis can be distinguished on the basis of a multi-primer polymerase chain reaction that targets the recA gene. A genome of B. intermedia was sequenced and submitted to GenBank in 2013.
