= Charles Pilet =

French academic and immunology researcher (1931–2026)

Charles Pilet (22 February 1931 – 7 April 2026) was a French academic-researcher, who was a member of the Institut de France, member of the French Academy of sciences, Honorary President of the French Academy of medicine and the Académie vétérinaire de France, member of the French Academy of technologies, Professor Emeritus and Honorary Director of the École nationale vétérinaire d'Alfort.

== Life and career ==
Student at the École nationale vétérinaire de Lyon (1950-1954), a graduate in microbiology from the Institut Pasteur de Paris (1955); Assistant (1956), Head of Works (1957) at the École nationale vétérinaire d'Alfort, Charles Pilet graduated from the École nationale vétérinaire d'Alfort in 1960 and was appointed Head of Department in 1964. He was appointed Full Professor of Microbiology-Immunology, General Pathology at the École Nationale Vétérinaire d'Alfort in 1967. He became director of this school in 1975, and was re-elected and reappointed to this position for a further five-year term in 1980.

His time at the Alfort School was marked by the development of the School's international relations, the creation of the Institute of Animal and Comparative Immunology (1981) recognized by the World Health Organization as a WHO collaborating centre in 1984, the effective commissioning of a clinical application antenna in the provinces, the construction of two new buildings, and the doubling of the number of students over four years ("double promotions").

Pilet created the scientific journal "Comparative Immunology Microbiology and Infectious Disease" in 1978 (Ed : Pergamon, then Elsevier) and remained editor-in-chief until the end of his teaching and research duties.

Elected member of the Académie vétérinaire de France in 1977, he became president in 1988.

He was elected a member of the French Academy of Medicine in 1983 and chaired the Academy in 1999. His presidency will be marked by several important reforms, in particular concerning the governance of the Academy (modification of the role of the Board of Directors), the recognition of the truly national character of the institution thanks to the abolition of the "non-resident section", the implementation of a communication adapted to the needs of the time, the promotion of the corresponding members, and the presence of the President of the Republic at the Academy in November 1999.

Elected corresponding member of the French Academy of sciences in 1990, he became a full member of this company in 2005.

Pilet was also a member of the French Academy of Technologies (2000). It also belongs to the Romanian Academy of Scientists, the Spanish Academy of Veterinary Sciences and the Italian Society of Veterinary Sciences.

Pilet died on 7 April 2026, at the age of 95.

== Other responsibilities at the national level ==
- Member of the National Pharmacopoeia Commission (1970)
- President of the French Committee of the World Veterinary Association (1985)
- Member of the National Research Evaluation Committee (CNER) (1997-2003) He is the initiator within CNER of the report entitled "Research on animals and human health" (Documentation française.2003)
- President of the CAMPUS Committee (Cooperation with Africa and Madagascar for Academic and Scientific Promotion at the Ministry of Cooperation). (1987-1997)
- Head of the network responsible for preparing the French scientific project for the second meeting of Heads of State and Government sharing the French language (second Francophone summit; Quebec 1987)
- Member of the Medical Board of Électricité de France/ Gaz de France (2001-2007)
- Member of the committee in charge of drafting the environmental charter (2003) (Ch. Pilet was one of the members of this committee who opposed the inclusion of the precautionary principle in the constitution.)
- Expert at the Paris Cour d'Appel (1975-2001)
- President of the Scientific Council of the Louis Mallardé Institute (Papeete, Polynesia 2001- 2007)
- In charge of the French government's implementation of France's assistance to Tunisia for the establishment of the Tunisian Veterinary School. (1974-1980)

== Other international responsibilities ==
- Expert on European Pharmacopoeia at the Council of Europe (1970-1995)
- President of the 15V Group of the European Pharmacopoeia (1975-1995)
- Member and then President of the Association of Veterinary Microbiologists, Immunologists and Infectious Disease Specialists (1977).
- Member of the High Council of Universities totally or partially French-speaking (1988). Charles Pilet founded the Association des établissements vétérinaires totalement ou partiellement de langue française and the Association des vétérinaire francophones.
- Vice-President of the World Veterinary Association (1991-1999)
- Co-Chairman of the Franco-Japanese Society of Veterinary Sciences.
- Advisor for veterinary research in Tunisia (1975)
- Adviser for veterinary education in Tunisia (1976)

== Scientific work ==
After a series of studies, at the beginning of his career, on several animal disease viruses, some of which were suspected at the time of being transmissible to humans, Charles Pilet directed his research towards the immunology of Brucella, which then led him to focus on immunostimulation.

=== Immunology of Brucella ===
- A new type of vaccine

Charles Pilet and Marc Bonneau are creating a new type of vaccine from a strain of Brucella abortus made non-agglutinogenic by saturating peripheral antigens with specific immunoglobulins. This vaccine did not develop agglutinating antibodies. This property made it possible to distinguish infected animals (carriers of agglutinating antibodies) from vaccinated animals (not carriers of this type of antibody) and thus to facilitate disease prophylaxis. This type of vaccine also confirmed the essentially cellular nature of brucella immunity and the passive role of antibodies.

- A new diagnostic method

The diagnosis of chronic human brucellosis is made difficult by the serological silence that is most often observed in this phase of the disease. Given the essentially cellular nature of brucella immunity, Charles Pilet and his team proposed replacing the traditional serodiagnosis with a cellular test. This new diagnostic possibility led the microbiology laboratory at the École d'Alfort to receive numerous requests for examinations from Parisian hospitals at the time.

- An improved vaccine control method

The study of several mouse lines showed the sensitivity of some of these lines to Brucella abortus, which made it possible to propose a new method for controlling brucella vaccines, a method that has since been adopted internationally.

- A new approach to immune tolerance

The dogma of the time that the newborn animal or human being was tolerant to a foreign substance was in fact only partially accurate. Work on immune tolerance had previously been conducted with soluble antigens. Using a particulate antigen extracted from Brucella, Charles Pilet and his team showed that in this case, the newborn mouse could respond very early to antigenic solicitation. This lack of immune tolerance is probably due to the non-specific activity of Brucella's particulate extracts on the maturation of the immune system, which becomes able to respond to specific antigenic stimulation much earlier by a classical immune response.

=== Immunostimulation ===
This observation relating to immune tolerance, as well as a clinical observation, led to a new direction in Charles Pilet's work. It had been noted that the injection of Mycobacterium chelonae (tubercular bacillus isolated from turtles) into animals significantly increased their resistance to infections. The isolation of the active ingredient of this bacterium, entrusted to Tsehay Neway, made it possible to isolate a polar glycopeptidolipid (GPLP). This substance has shown significant activity on immune cells. This immunostimulant acting on bone marrow stem cells was also a true hematopoietic growth factor and was able to correct immunosuppression in mice caused by cancer chemotherapy. Unfortunately, the synthesis of this product of biological origin has proved too expensive to allow human trials to be conducted.

== Some works ==
- Ch. Pilet, J.L. Bourdon, N. Marchal. Le laboratoire de bactériologie. Edit: Doin 1972
- Ch.Pilet, J.L.Bourdon, B.Toma, N.Marchal, C.Balestre, JL.Person. Bactériologie médicale et vétérinaire. Edit: In 1981 and 1989
- Charles Pilet and Nicole Priollaud. L’Animal médecin Edit : Actes Sud

== Distinctions ==
- Commandeur of the Légion d'Honneur
- Commandeur of the Palmes Académiques
- Chevalier of Mérite Agricole
- Commandeur of the National Order of the Republic of Côte d'Ivoire
- Officier of the Order of the Republic of Tunisia
- Officier of the Order of Merit of the Republic of Senegal
