= Brucella inopinata =

Scientific classification
- Domain: Bacteria
- Kingdom: Pseudomonadati
- Phylum: Pseudomonadota
- Class: Alphaproteobacteria
- Order: Hyphomicrobiales
- Family: Brucellaceae
- Genus: Brucella
- Species: B. inopinata

Binomial name
- Brucella inopinata Scholz et al. 2010

Type strain
- BO1^{T} (=BCCN 09-01^{T} =CPAM 6436^{T})

Species of bacterium

Brucella inopinata is a Gram-negative, nonmotile, non-spore-forming coccoid bacterium, first isolated from a breast implant infection site. Its type strain is BO1^{T} (=BCCN 09-01^{T} =CPAM 6436^{T}). It is a potential cause of brucellosis.
