= Falsochrobactrum shanghaiense =

Scientific classification
- Domain: Bacteria
- Kingdom: Pseudomonadati
- Phylum: Pseudomonadota
- Class: Alphaproteobacteria
- Order: Hyphomicrobiales
- Family: Brucellaceae
- Genus: Falsochrobactrum
- Species: F. shanghaiense

Binomial name
- Falsochrobactrum shanghaiense Sun 2019

Species of bacterium

Falsochrobactrum shanghaiense is a bacterial species in the Brucellaceae family.

== Discovery ==
Falsochrobactrum shanghaiense was isolated from soil from a paddy farm in Shanghai, China. It was identified as a member of Falsochrobactrum based on morphology, chemical composition, and sequencing of the 16s rRNA gene.

== Growth and morphology ==
Falsochrobactrum shanghaiense displays growth at temperatures between 15-40°C, with optimal growth temperatures between 30-35°C. It is gram-negative, rod-shaped, and possesses a flagellum. Glucose, xylose, and fructose are assimilated by F. shanghaiense, but it cannot use other sugars such as lactose, maltose, and mannose.

== Phylogeny ==
The status of the genus Falsochrobactrum has been brought into question by differences in genome between F. shanghaiense and Falsochrobactrum ovis.
