= Brucella lupini =

Scientific classification
- Domain: Bacteria
- Kingdom: Pseudomonadati
- Phylum: Pseudomonadota
- Class: Alphaproteobacteria
- Order: Hyphomicrobiales
- Family: Brucellaceae
- Genus: Brucella
- Species: B. lupini

Binomial name
- Brucella lupini (Trujillo et al. 2006) Hördt et al. 2020

Type strain
- LUP21^{T} (LMG 20667^{T})

Synonyms
- Ochrobactrum lupini Trujillo et al. 2006

Species of bacterium

Brucella lupini is a non-rhizobial root-nodulating bacterium. It nodulates Lupinus albus, hence its name. Strain LUP21^{T} (LMG 20667^{T}) is the type strain.
