= Brucella microti =

Scientific classification
- Domain: Bacteria
- Kingdom: Pseudomonadati
- Phylum: Pseudomonadota
- Class: Alphaproteobacteria
- Order: Hyphomicrobiales
- Family: Brucellaceae
- Genus: Brucella
- Species: B. microti

Binomial name
- Brucella microti Scholz et al. 2008

Species of bacterium

Brucella microti is a species of bacteria first isolated from the common vole, Microtus arvalis. Its genome has been sequenced. It is Gram-negative, non-motile, non-spore-forming, and coccoid, with the type strain CCM 4915^{T} (=BCCN 07-01^{T} =CAPM 6434^{T}). It is pathogenic.
