= Paenochrobactrum gallinarii =

Scientific classification
- Domain: Bacteria
- Kingdom: Pseudomonadati
- Phylum: Pseudomonadota
- Class: Alphaproteobacteria
- Order: Hyphomicrobiales
- Family: Brucellaceae
- Genus: Paenochrobactrum
- Species: P. gallinarii

Binomial name
- Paenochrobactrum gallinarii Kämpfer et al. 2010

Species of bacterium

Paenochrobactrum gallinarii is a bacterium from the genus Paenochrobactrum which was isolated from air of a duck barn in Berlin.
