= Brucella daejeonensis =

Brucella daejeonense

Scientific classification
- Domain: Bacteria
- Kingdom: Pseudomonadati
- Phylum: Pseudomonadota
- Class: Alphaproteobacteria
- Order: Hyphomicrobiales
- Family: Brucellaceae
- Genus: Brucella
- Species: B. daejeonensis

Binomial name
- Brucella daejeonensis (Woo et al. 2011) Hördt et al. 2020

Type strain
- JCM 16234, KCTC 22458, MJ11

Synonyms
- Ochrobactrum daejeonense Woo et al. 2011

Species of bacterium

Brucella daejeonensis is a gram-negative, nitrate-reducing aerobic, non-spore-forming, rod-shaped bacteria from the genus of Brucella which was isolated in Daejeon in South Korea.
