= Brucella rhizosphaerae =

Scientific classification
- Domain: Bacteria
- Kingdom: Pseudomonadati
- Phylum: Pseudomonadota
- Class: Alphaproteobacteria
- Order: Hyphomicrobiales
- Family: Brucellaceae
- Genus: Brucella
- Species: B. rhizosphaerae

Binomial name
- Brucella rhizosphaerae (Kämpfer et al. 2008) Hördt et al. 2020

Type strain
- CCM 7493, CCUG 55411, DSM 19824, PR17

Synonyms
- Ochrobactrum rhizosphaerae Kämpfer et al. 2008

Species of bacterium

Brucella rhizosphaerae is a gram-negative, oxidase-positive bacteria from the genus Brucella which was isolated from rhizosphere from a potato in Austria.
