= Brucella cytisi =

Scientific classification
- Domain: Bacteria
- Kingdom: Pseudomonadati
- Phylum: Pseudomonadota
- Class: Alphaproteobacteria
- Order: Hyphomicrobiales
- Family: Brucellaceae
- Genus: Brucella
- Species: B. cytisi

Binomial name
- Brucella cytisi (Zurdo-Piñeiro et al. 2007) Hördt et al. 2020

Type strain
- ESC1^{T} (=LMG 22713^{T}=CECT 7172^{T})

Synonyms
- Ochrobactrum cytisi Zurdo-Piñeiro et al. 2007

Species of bacterium

Brucella cytisi is a non-rhizobial root-nodulating bacterium. It nodulates Cytisus scoparius, hence its name. Strain ESC1^{T} (=LMG 22713^{T}=CECT 7172^{T}) is the type strain.
