= Pseudochrobactrum saccharolyticum =

Scientific classification
- Domain: Bacteria
- Kingdom: Pseudomonadati
- Phylum: Pseudomonadota
- Class: Alphaproteobacteria
- Order: Hyphomicrobiales
- Family: Brucellaceae
- Genus: Pseudochrobactrum
- Species: P. saccharolyticum

Binomial name
- Pseudochrobactrum saccharolyticum Kämpfer et al. 2006

Type strain
- CCUG 33852, CIP 108976, JUgrå

Species of bacterium

Pseudochrobactrum saccharolyticum is a bacterium from the genus of Pseudochrobactrum which was isolated from industrial glue.
