= Daeguia caeni =

Scientific classification
- Domain: Bacteria
- Kingdom: Pseudomonadati
- Phylum: Pseudomonadota
- Class: Alphaproteobacteria
- Order: Hyphomicrobiales
- Family: Brucellaceae
- Genus: Daeguia
- Species: D. caeni

Binomial name
- Daeguia caeni Yoon et al. 2008

Synonyms
- Daegunia caeni, Mycoplana caeni

Species of bacterium

Daeguia caeni is a Gram-negative, non-spore-forming bacterium from the genus Daeguia, which was isolated from sludge of a textile dye works in Daegu in Korea.
