= Brucella pseudintermedia =

Scientific classification
- Domain: Bacteria
- Kingdom: Pseudomonadati
- Phylum: Pseudomonadota
- Class: Alphaproteobacteria
- Order: Hyphomicrobiales
- Family: Brucellaceae
- Genus: Brucella
- Species: B. pseudintermedia

Binomial name
- Brucella pseudintermedia (Teyssier et al. 2007) Hördt et al. 2020

Synonyms
- Ochrobactrum pseudintermedium Teyssier et al. 2007

Species of bacterium

Brucella pseudintermedia is a gram-negative, non-spore-forming, motile bacteria from the genus Brucella with a subpolar flagella which was isolated from human axillary swab in Montpellier in France.
