= Pseudochrobactrum kiredjianiae =

Scientific classification
- Domain: Bacteria
- Kingdom: Pseudomonadati
- Phylum: Pseudomonadota
- Class: Alphaproteobacteria
- Order: Hyphomicrobiales
- Family: Brucellaceae
- Genus: Pseudochrobactrum
- Species: P. kiredjianiae

Binomial name
- Pseudochrobactrum kiredjianiae Kämpfer et al. 2007

Type strain
- CCUG 49584, CIP 109227, DSM 19762, SS5

Species of bacterium

Pseudochrobactrum kiredjianiae is a bacterium from the genus of Pseudochrobactrum which was isolated in Nelson in New Zealand.
