= Pseudochrobactrum lubricantis =

Scientific classification
- Domain: Bacteria
- Kingdom: Pseudomonadati
- Phylum: Pseudomonadota
- Class: Alphaproteobacteria
- Order: Hyphomicrobiales
- Family: Brucellaceae
- Genus: Pseudochrobactrum
- Species: P. lubricantis

Binomial name
- Pseudochrobactrum lubricantis Kämpfer et al. 2009

Type strain
- CCM 7581, CCUG 56963, DSM 21820, KSS 7.8

Species of bacterium

Pseudochrobactrum lubricantis is a Gram-negative, oxidase-positive, non-spore-forming, rod-shaped, nonmotile bacterium of the genus Pseudochrobactrum, which was isolated from water mixed metal-working fluid in Germany.
