= Brucella ciceri =

Scientific classification
- Domain: Bacteria
- Kingdom: Pseudomonadati
- Phylum: Pseudomonadota
- Class: Alphaproteobacteria
- Order: Hyphomicrobiales
- Family: Brucellaceae
- Genus: Brucella
- Species: B. ciceri

Binomial name
- Brucella ciceri (Imran et al. 2010) Hördt et al. 2020

Type strain
- Ca-34, CCUG 57879, DSM 22292

Synonyms
- Ochrobactrum ciceri Imran et al. 2010

Species of bacterium

Brucella ciceri is a gram-negative, oxidase- and catalase-positive, aerobic bacteria from the genus of Brucella which was isolated from a chickpea (Cicer arietinum) in Pakistan.

== Description ==
Brucella ciceri is highly motile, and exists in the form of short rods resembling dumbells, typically observed as single cells. Colonies appear circular, off-white, and about 2-3mm in diameter when grown on YEM agar or LB agar. it is capable of using many common carbon sources, such as sucrose and mannitol. The type strain has been reported to be resistant to antimicrobials such as ampicillin, aztreonam, cefixime, and cefradine.
