= Paenochrobactrum pullorum =

Scientific classification
- Domain: Bacteria
- Kingdom: Pseudomonadati
- Phylum: Pseudomonadota
- Class: Alphaproteobacteria
- Order: Hyphomicrobiales
- Family: Brucellaceae
- Genus: Paenochrobactrum
- Species: P. pullorum

Binomial name
- Paenochrobactrum pullorum Kämpfer et al. 2014

Species of bacterium

Paenochrobactrum pullorum is a Gram-negative, oxidase-positive, non-spore-forming, rod-shaped, nonmotile bacterium from the genus Paenochrobactrum, which was isolated from faeces of a chicken in Germany
