= Brucella pseudogrignonensis =

Scientific classification
- Domain: Bacteria
- Kingdom: Pseudomonadati
- Phylum: Pseudomonadota
- Class: Alphaproteobacteria
- Order: Hyphomicrobiales
- Family: Brucellaceae
- Genus: Brucella
- Species: B. pseudogrignonensis

Binomial name
- Brucella pseudogrignonensis (Kämpfer et al.. 2007) Hördt et al.. 2020

Synonyms
- Ochrobactrum pseudogrignonense Kämpfer et al. 2007

Species of bacterium

Brucella pseudogrignonensis is a gram-negative, oxidase-positive, non-spore-forming, non-motile bacteria from the genus Brucella which was isolated from blood of a man in Gothenburg in Sweden.
