= Pseudochrobactrum asaccharolyticum =

Scientific classification
- Domain: Bacteria
- Kingdom: Pseudomonadati
- Phylum: Pseudomonadota
- Class: Alphaproteobacteria
- Order: Hyphomicrobiales
- Family: Brucellaceae
- Genus: Pseudochrobactrum
- Species: P. asaccharolyticum

Binomial name
- Pseudochrobactrum asaccharolyticum Kämpfer et al. 2006

Type strain
- CCUG 46016, CIP 108977, SMI R 9/02, Uddev SP 01-3641

Species of bacterium

Pseudochrobactrum asaccharolyticum is a Gram-negative, oxidase-positive, non-spore-forming, nonmotile bacterium of the genus Pseudochrobactrum.
