= Brucella pecoris =

Scientific classification
- Domain: Bacteria
- Kingdom: Pseudomonadati
- Phylum: Pseudomonadota
- Class: Alphaproteobacteria
- Order: Hyphomicrobiales
- Family: Brucellaceae
- Genus: Brucella
- Species: B. pecoris

Binomial name
- Brucella pecoris (Kämpfer et al. 2011) Hördt et al. 2020

Type strain
- 08RB2639, CCM 7822, CCUG 60088, DSM 23868

Synonyms
- Ochrobactrum pecoris Kämpfer et al. 2011

Species of bacterium

Brucella pecoris is a gram-negative, oxidase-positive, non-spore-forming, rod-shaped non-motile bacteria from the genus Brucella which was isolated from genitourinary lymph node of a sheep in Bosnia and Herzegovina.
