= Brucella vulpis =

Scientific classification
- Domain: Bacteria
- Kingdom: Pseudomonadati
- Phylum: Pseudomonadota
- Class: Alphaproteobacteria
- Order: Hyphomicrobiales
- Family: Brucellaceae
- Genus: Brucella
- Species: B. vulpis

Binomial name
- Brucella vulpis Scholz et al. 2016

Type strain
- BCCN 09-2, F60, F965, DSM 101715

Species of bacterium

Brucella vulpis is a Gram-negative, non-spore-forming and non-motile bacteria from the genus Brucella which has been isolated from the mandibular lymph nodes of foxes (Vulpes vulpes).
