= Paenochrobactrum glaciei =

Scientific classification
- Domain: Bacteria
- Kingdom: Pseudomonadati
- Phylum: Pseudomonadota
- Class: Alphaproteobacteria
- Order: Hyphomicrobiales
- Family: Brucellaceae
- Genus: Paenochrobactrum
- Species: P. glaciei

Binomial name
- Paenochrobactrum glaciei (Romanenko et al. 2008) Kämpfer et al. 2010

Synonyms
- Pseudochrobactrum glaciale; Pseudochrobactrum glaciei

Species of bacterium

Paenochrobactrum glaciei is a bacterium from the genus Paenochrobactrum reclassified from Pseudochrobactrum glaciei.
