= Brucella thiophenivorans =

Scientific classification
- Domain: Bacteria
- Kingdom: Pseudomonadati
- Phylum: Pseudomonadota
- Class: Alphaproteobacteria
- Order: Hyphomicrobiales
- Family: Brucellaceae
- Genus: Brucella
- Species: B. thiophenivorans

Binomial name
- Brucella thiophenivorans (Kämpfer et al. 2008) Hördt et al. 2020

Type strain
- AK220, CCM 7492, CCUG 55412, DSM 7216

Synonyms
- Ochrobactrum thiophenivorans Kämpfer et al. 2008

Species of bacterium

Brucella thiophenivorans is a gram-negative, oxidase-positive, non-spore-forming non-motile bacteria from the genus Brucella which was isolated from waste water in Germany.
