= Brucella grignonensis =

Scientific classification
- Domain: Bacteria
- Kingdom: Pseudomonadati
- Phylum: Pseudomonadota
- Class: Alphaproteobacteria
- Order: Hyphomicrobiales
- Family: Brucellaceae
- Genus: Brucella
- Species: B. grignonensis

Binomial name
- Brucella grignonensis (Lebuhn et al. 2000) Hördt et al. 2020

Type strain
- OgA9a^{T} (= LMG 18954^{T} =DSM 13338^{T})

Synonyms
- Ochrobactrum grignonense Lebuhn et al. 2000

Species of bacterium

Brucella grignonensis is a bacterium. Its type strain is OgA9a^{T} (= LMG 18954^{T} =DSM 13338^{T}).
