= Brucella papionis =

Scientific classification
- Domain: Bacteria
- Kingdom: Pseudomonadati
- Phylum: Pseudomonadota
- Class: Alphaproteobacteria
- Order: Hyphomicrobiales
- Family: Brucellaceae
- Genus: Brucella
- Species: B. papionis

Binomial name
- Brucella papionis Whatmore et al. 2014

Type strain
- F8/08/60, F8/08/61, CIRMBP 0958, NCTC 13660

Synonyms
- Brucella papii

Species of bacterium

Brucella papionis is a Gram-negative, non-spore-forming and non-motile bacteria from the family Brucella which has been isolated from baboons.
