= Alanine—oxo-acid transaminase =

Enzyme within the transanimase family

Alanine-oxo-acid transaminase

Identifiers
- EC no.: 2.6.1.12
- CAS no.: 9030-41-5

Databases
- IntEnz: IntEnz view
- BRENDA: BRENDA entry
- ExPASy: NiceZyme view
- KEGG: KEGG entry
- MetaCyc: metabolic pathway
- PRIAM: profile
- PDB structures: RCSB PDB PDBe PDBsum
- Gene Ontology: AmiGO / QuickGO
Search
- PMC: articles
- PubMed: articles
- NCBI: proteins

Alanine-oxo-acid transaminase (EC 2.6.1.12) is an enzyme characterised in Brucella abortus and some plants that catalyzes a general chemical reaction that converts L-alanine and an α-keto acid into pyruvic acid and an L-amino acid:

L-alanine + a 2-oxo acid $\rightleftharpoons$ pyruvic acid + an L-amino acid

For example, reaction with α-ketoglutaric acid gives L-aspartic acid:

alanine
+
α-ketoglutaric acid
pyruvic acid
+
aspartic acid

This enzyme is a transferase, specifically a transaminase, which transfer nitrogenous groups. The systematic name of this enzyme class is L-alanine:2-oxo-acid aminotransferase. Other names in common use include L-alanine-alpha-keto acid aminotransferase, leucine-alanine transaminase, alanine-keto acid aminotransferase, and alanine-oxo acid aminotransferase. It uses pyridoxal phosphate as a cofactor.
