= Pituitosa =

Pituitosa may refer to:

- Brucella pituitosa, species of bacteria
- Sphingomonas pituitosa, species of bacteria
