= Brucella gallinifaecis =

Scientific classification
- Domain: Bacteria
- Kingdom: Pseudomonadati
- Phylum: Pseudomonadota
- Class: Alphaproteobacteria
- Order: Hyphomicrobiales
- Family: Brucellaceae
- Genus: Brucella
- Species: B. gallinifaecis

Binomial name
- Brucella gallinifaecis (Kämpfer et al. 2003) Hördt et al. 2020

Synonyms
- Ochrobactrum gallinifaecis Kämpfer et al. 2003

Species of bacterium

Brucella gallinifaecis is a gram-negative, non-spore-forming, rod-shaped bacteria from the genus of Brucella which was isolated from chicken faeces in Germany.
