= Brucella haematophila =

Scientific classification
- Domain: Bacteria
- Kingdom: Pseudomonadati
- Phylum: Pseudomonadota
- Class: Alphaproteobacteria
- Order: Hyphomicrobiales
- Family: Brucellaceae
- Genus: Brucella
- Species: B. haematophila

Binomial name
- Brucella haematophila (Kämpfer et al. 2007) Hördt et al. 2020

Synonyms
- Ochrobactrum haematophilum Kämpfer et al. 2007

Species of bacterium

Brucella haematophila is a gram-negative, oxidase-positive, non-spore-forming, non-motile bacteria from the genus of Brucella which was isolated from a man in Falun in Sweden.
