= Brucella endophytica =

Scientific classification
- Domain: Bacteria
- Kingdom: Pseudomonadati
- Phylum: Pseudomonadota
- Class: Alphaproteobacteria
- Order: Hyphomicrobiales
- Family: Brucellaceae
- Genus: Brucella
- Species: B. endophytica

Binomial name
- Brucella endophytica (Li et al. 2016) Hördt et al. 2020

Type strain
- CGMCC 1.15082, DSM 29930, KCTC 42485, EGI 60010

Synonyms
- Ochrobactrum endophyticum Li et al. 2016

Species of bacterium

Brucella endophytica is a Gram-negative, aerobic, rod-shaped and bacteria from the genus of Brucella which has been isolated from the roots of the plant Glycyrrhiza uralensis from Yuli County in China.
