= Brucella tritici =

Scientific classification
- Domain: Bacteria
- Kingdom: Pseudomonadati
- Phylum: Pseudomonadota
- Class: Alphaproteobacteria
- Order: Hyphomicrobiales
- Family: Brucellaceae
- Genus: Brucella
- Species: B. tritici

Binomial name
- Brucella tritici (Lebuhn et al. 2000) Hördt et al. 2020

Synonyms
- Ochrobactrum tritici Lebuhn et al. 2000

Species of bacterium

Brucella tritici is a species of gram-negative bacteria first isolated from wheat rhizoplane. Its type strain is SCII24^{T} (= LMG 18957^{T} = DSM 13340^{T}).
