= Brucella oryzae =

Scientific classification
- Domain: Bacteria
- Kingdom: Pseudomonadati
- Phylum: Pseudomonadota
- Class: Alphaproteobacteria
- Order: Hyphomicrobiales
- Family: Brucellaceae
- Genus: Brucella
- Species: B. oryzae

Binomial name
- Brucella oryzae (Tripathi et al. 2006) Hördt et al. 2020

Synonyms
- Ochrobactrum oryzae Tripathi et al. 2006

Species of bacterium

Brucella oryzae is an endophytic bacterial species. It is non-pigmented, motile and Gram-negative, with type strain MTCC 4195^{T} (=DSM 17471^{T}).
