= Brucella anthropi =

Scientific classification
- Domain: Bacteria
- Kingdom: Pseudomonadati
- Phylum: Pseudomonadota
- Class: Alphaproteobacteria
- Order: Hyphomicrobiales
- Family: Brucellaceae
- Genus: Brucella
- Species: B. anthropi

Binomial name
- Brucella anthropi (Holmes et al. 1988) Hördt et al. 2020

Synonyms
- Ochrobactrum anthropi Holmes et al. 1988

Species of bacterium

Brucella anthropi is a bacterium. Before 2020 it was listed as Ochrobactrum anthropi. This change in nomenclature has been disputed. The type strain is strain CIP 82.115 (= CIP 14970 = NCTC 12168 = LMG 3331). B. anthropi strains are rod-shaped, aerobic, gram-negative, non-pigmented and motile by means of peritrichous flagella. One strain is able to break down Piracetam.

They are emerging as major opportunistic pathogens.
