= Brucella pinnipedialis =

Scientific classification
- Domain: Bacteria
- Kingdom: Pseudomonadati
- Phylum: Pseudomonadota
- Class: Alphaproteobacteria
- Order: Hyphomicrobiales
- Family: Brucellaceae
- Genus: Brucella
- Species: B. pinnipedialis

Binomial name
- Brucella pinnipedialis Foster et al. 2007

Species of bacterium

Brucella pinnipedialis (heterotypic synonym "Brucella pinnipediae" Cloeckaert et al. 2001) is a species of bacteria. It causes infections and related diseases primarily in pinnipeds and cetaceans.
