= Pseudochrobactrum =

Scientific classification
- Domain: Bacteria
- Kingdom: Pseudomonadati
- Phylum: Pseudomonadota
- Class: Alphaproteobacteria
- Order: Hyphomicrobiales
- Family: Brucellaceae
- Genus: Pseudochrobactrum; Kämpfer et al. 2006

Type species
- Pseudochrobactrum asaccharolyticum

Species
- P. asaccharolyticum P. kiredjianiae P. lubricantis P. saccharolyticum

Genus of bacteria

Pseudochrobactrum is a genus of bacteria from the family of Brucellaceae.
