= Daeguia =

Scientific classification
- Domain: Bacteria
- Kingdom: Pseudomonadati
- Phylum: Pseudomonadota
- Class: Alphaproteobacteria
- Order: Hyphomicrobiales
- Family: Brucellaceae
- Genus: Daeguia; Yoon et al. 2008

Type species
- D. caeni

Genus of bacteria

Daeguia is a genus in the phylum Pseudomonadota (Bacteria).

== Etymology ==
The name Daeguia derives from: Neo-Latin Daeguia, pertaining to Daegu, the location of the textile dye works from which the type strain of the type species was isolated. The genus contains a single species, D. caeni (Yoon et al. 2008, (type species of the genus) from Latin caeni, of sludge)

== See also ==
- Bacterial taxonomy
- Microbiology
