= Falsochrobactrum ovis =

Scientific classification
- Domain: Bacteria
- Kingdom: Pseudomonadati
- Phylum: Pseudomonadota
- Class: Alphaproteobacteria
- Order: Hyphomicrobiales
- Family: Brucellaceae
- Genus: Falsochrobactrum
- Species: F. ovis

Binomial name
- Falsochrobactrum ovis Kämpfer et al. 2013

Type strain
- CCM 8460, LMG 27356, B1315

Species of bacterium

Falsochrobactrum ovis is a Gram-negative, rod-shaped, non-spore-forming and non-motile bacterium from the genus of Falsochrobactrum which has been isolated from the placenta of a sheep.
