= Falsochrobactrum =

Scientific classification
- Domain: Bacteria
- Kingdom: Pseudomonadati
- Phylum: Pseudomonadota
- Class: Alphaproteobacteria
- Order: Hyphomicrobiales
- Family: Brucellaceae
- Genus: Falsochrobactrum; Kämpfer et al. 2013

Type species
- Falsochrobactrum ovis Kämpfer et al. 2013

Species
- Falsochrobactrum ovis Kämpfer et al. 2013; Falsochrobactrum shanghaiense Sun et al. 2019

Genus of bacteria

Falsochrobactrum is a genus of bacteria from the family of Brucellaceae.
