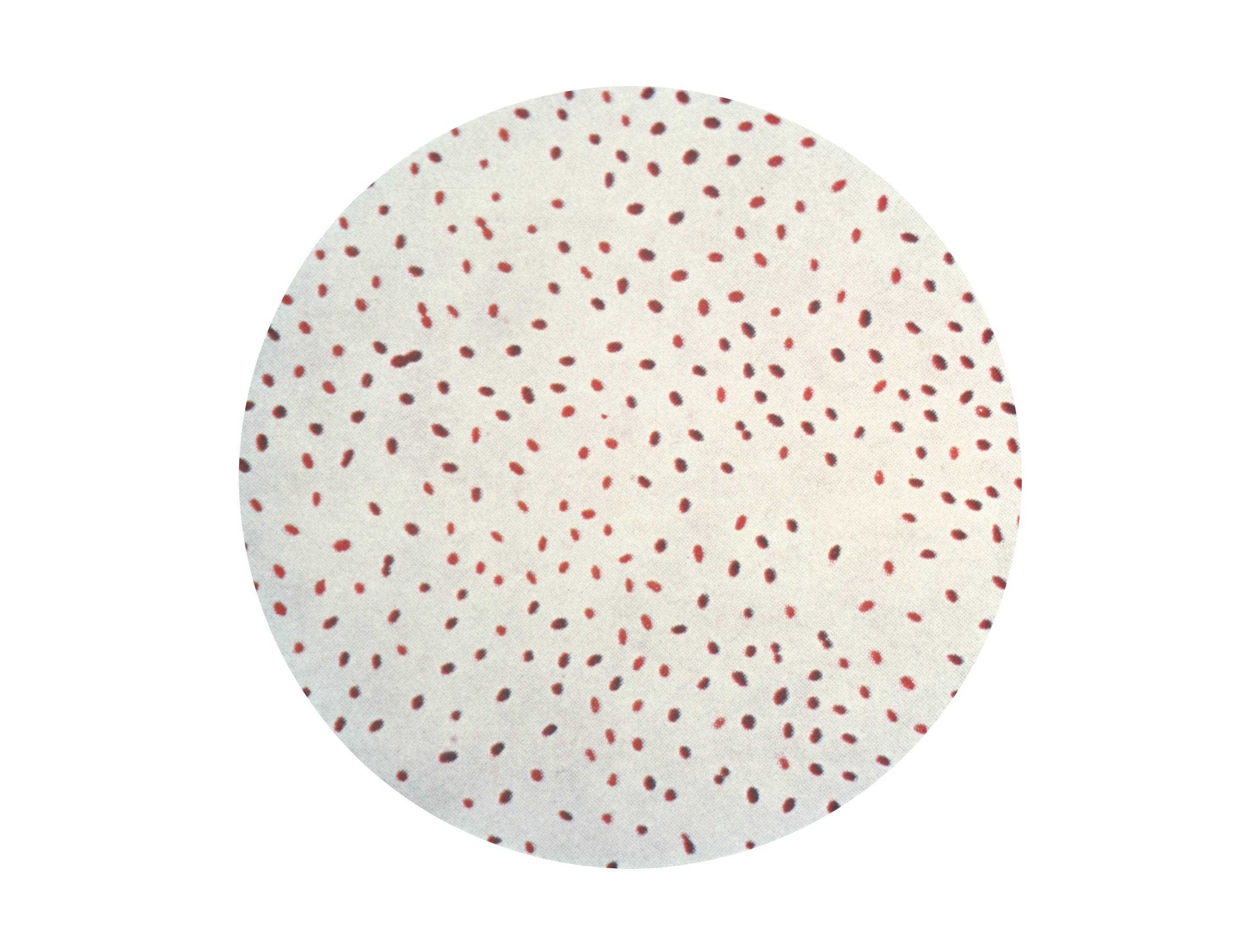

Scientific classification
- Domain: Bacteria
- Kingdom: Pseudomonadati
- Phylum: Pseudomonadota
- Class: Alphaproteobacteria
- Order: Hyphomicrobiales
- Family: Brucellaceae
- Genus: Brucella; Meyer and Shaw 1920 (Approved Lists 1980)

Species
- Brucella anthropi (Holmes et al. 1988) Hördt et al. 2020; "Brucella cetaceae" Cloeckaert et al. 2001; Brucella ceti Foster et al. 2007; Brucella ciceri (Imran et al. 2010) Hördt et al. 2020; Brucella cytisi (Zurdo-Piñeiro et al. 2007) Hördt et al. 2020; Brucella daejeonensis (Woo et al. 2011) Hördt et al. 2020; Brucella endophytica (Li et al. 2016) Hördt et al. 2020; Brucella gallinifaecis (Kämpfer et al. 2003) Hördt et al. 2020; Brucella grignonensis (Lebuhn et al. 2000) Hördt et al. 2020; Brucella haematophila (Kämpfer et al. 2007) Hördt et al. 2020; Brucella inopinata Scholz et al. 2010; Brucella intermedia (Velasco et al. 1998) Hördt et al. 2020; Brucella lupini (Trujillo et al. 2006) Hördt et al. 2020; "Brucella maris" Jahans et al. 1997; Brucella melitensis (Hughes 1893) Meyer and Shaw 1920 (Approved Lists 1980) (Note: Brucella abortus, Brucella canis, Brucella neotomae, Brucella ovis, and Brucella suis are all synonyms of Brucella melitensis.); Brucella abortus (Schmidt 1901) Meyer and Shaw 1920 (Approved Lists 1980); Brucella canis Carmichael and Bruner 1968 (Approved Lists 1980); Brucella neotomae Stoenner and Lackman 1957 (Approved Lists 1980); Brucella ovis Buddle 1956 (Approved Lists 1980); Brucella suis Huddleson 1929 (Approved Lists 1980); Brucella microti Scholz et al. 2008; Brucella oryzae (Tripathi et al. 2006) Hördt et al. 2020; Brucella papionis Whatmore et al. 2014; Brucella pecoris (Kämpfer et al. 2011) Hördt et al. 2020; Brucella pinnipedialis Foster et al. 2007; Brucella pituitosa (Huber et al 2010) Hördt et al. 2020; Brucella pseudintermedia (Teyssier et al. 2007) Hördt et al. 2020; Brucella pseudogrignonensis (Kämpfer et al. 2007) Hördt et al. 2020; Brucella rhizosphaerae (Kämpfer et al. 2008) Hördt et al. 2020; Brucella thiophenivorans (Kämpfer et al. 2008) Hördt et al. 2020; Brucella tritici (Lebuhn et al. 2000) Hördt et al. 2020; Brucella vulpis Scholz et al. 2016

Synonyms
- Ochrobactrum Holmes et al. 1988

= Brucella =

Genus of bacteria

Brucella is a genus of Gram-negative bacteria, named after David Bruce (1855–1931). They are small (0.5 to 0.7 by 0.6 to 1.5 μm), non-encapsulated, non-motile, facultatively intracellular coccobacilli.

Brucella spp. are the cause of brucellosis, which is a zoonosis transmitted by ingesting contaminated food (such as unpasteurized milk products), direct contact with an infected animal, or inhalation of aerosols. Transmission from human to human, for example, through sexual intercourse, or from mother to child, is exceedingly rare, but possible. Minimum infectious exposure is between 10 and 100 organisms.

The different species of Brucella are genetically very similar, although each has a slightly different host specificity. Hence, the National Center for Biotechnology Information taxonomy includes most Brucella species under B. melitensis.

The many names of brucellosis include (human disease/animal disease):

- Malta fever/Bang's disease
- Undulant fever/enzootic abortion
- Mediterranean fever/epizootic abortion
- Rock fever of Gibraltar/slinking of calves
- Gastric fever/ram epididymitis
- Contagious abortion/spontaneous abortion

== Human brucellosis ==
Sir David Bruce isolated B. melitensis from British soldiers who died from Malta fever in Malta. After exposure to Brucella, humans generally have a two- to four-week latency period before exhibiting symptoms, which include acute undulating fever (>90% of all cases), headache, arthralgia (>50%), night sweats, fatigue, and anorexia. Later complications may include arthritis or epididymo-orchitis, spondylitis, neurobrucellosis, liver abscess formation, and endocarditis, the latter potentially fatal.

Human brucellosis is usually not transmitted from human to human; people become infected by contact with fluids from infected animals (sheep, cattle, or pigs) or derived food products, such as unpasteurized milk and cheese. Brucellosis is also considered an occupational disease because of a higher incidence in people working with animals (slaughterhouse cases). People may also be infected by inhalation of contaminated dust or aerosols, and as such, the CDC has labeled Brucella species as highly weaponizable. Human and animal brucellosis share the persistence of the bacteria in tissues of the mononuclear phagocyte system, including the spleen, liver, lymph nodes, and bone marrow. Brucella can also target the male reproductive tract.

Globally, an estimated 500,000 cases of brucellosis occur each year.

Malta fever was a major health problem to British troops in Malta in the 19th and early 20th centuries, resulting in over 6000 cases and 574 deaths. In 1860, J.A. Maraston, assistant surgeon in the British Army in Malta, gave the first accurate description of the disease he called "Mediterranean gastric remittent fever". In 1897, A.E. Wright, a pathologist in British army, developed the agglutination test, diagnostic of the disease.

In 1905, Zammit, a Maltese physician, identified goats as the source of infection. E. Bang, a Danish veterinarian, described the intracellular pathogen causing abortion in cattle in 1897, and named it Bacillus abortus. In 1918, A. Evans, an American microbiologist, made the connection between B. abortus and Micrococcus melitensis, and placed them in the Bacteriaceae.

In 1914, Mohler isolated an organism from the liver and spleen of pigs, B. suis; B. neotome, B. ovis, and B. canis were described in 1957, 1963, and 1966, respectively.

== Transmission ==
Zoonosis affecting domestic animals is caused by contact with milk, urine, and genital organs, which concentrate the causative organisms. Some reservoirs include buffalo and other animals, but mostly cattle. In humans, the disease is acquired from unpasteurised milk and products or undercooked meat (consumers), laboratory inhalation (lab workers), accidental skin penetration or abrasion (farmers, slaughterhouse workers, and veterinarians), and (rarely) conjunctival contact, blood transfusion, transplacental, and person-to-person.

== Human disease ==
Brucellosis can affect any organ or organ system, and 90% of patients have a cyclical (undulant) fever. Though variable, symptoms can also include these clinical signs: headache, weakness, arthralgia, depression, weight loss, fatigue, and liver dysfunction. Foul-smelling perspiration is considered a classical sign. Between 20 and 60% of cases have osteoarticular complications: arthritis, spondylitis, or osteomyelitis. Hepatomegaly may occur, as can gastrointestinal complications.

Up to 20% of cases can have genitourinary involvement; orchitis and epididymitis are most common. Neurological symptoms include depression and mental fatigue. Cardiovascular involvement can include endocarditis resulting in death.

Chronic brucellosis is hard to define; length, type, and response to treatment are variable. Localized infection can occur. Blood donations of infected persons should not be accepted.

The general agreement is that brucellosis in pregnant women is not linked to congenital malformations. The newborn can be either uninfected, which is more common, or infected with congenital or neonatal brucellosis. The majority of uninfected neonates delivered at term have a favorable outcome, whereas preterm births and cases with congenital brucellosis have an increased risk of neonatal death. Congenital brucellosis can be transmitted transplacentally, whereas neonatal brucellosis can be acquired through contact with body fluids secreted during birth or through postpartum breastfeeding. Congenital brucellosis, on the other hand, is a rare condition; most cases are associated with premature birth, and it affects about 2% of infants exposed to brucellosis in utero. Congenitally infected infants can exhibit low birth weight, failure to thrive, jaundice, hepatomegaly, splenomegaly, respiratory difficulty, and general signs of sepsis (fever, vomiting). Some cases are asymptomatic.

== Characteristics ==
Brucella species are small, Gram-negative, facultative coccobacilli, most lacking a capsule, endospores, or native plasmids. They are intracellular within the host organism, and show environmental persistence outside the host. The intracellular trafficking includes two or three main steps, starting with endosomal vacuoles, then endoplasmic reticulum-derived compartments and finally vacuoles having several markers of atypical autophagy. They survive extremes in temperature, pH, and humidity, and in frozen and aborted materials. They infect many species, but with some specificity.

The Brucella species belongs to the Rhizobiales group, in the Alphaproteobacteria class. They are growing by unipolar growth, like Agrobacterium tumefaciens, Sinorhizobium meliloti, and Ochrobactrum anthropi. They usually have two chromosomes and their replication and segregation are temporally organized.

== Clinical manifestations ==
The gastrointestinal tract is affected in about 70% of cases, including anorexia, abdominal pain, vomiting, diarrhea, constipation, hepatomegaly, and splenomegaly. The liver is involved in most cases, but function tests are normal or mildly abnormal. Granulomas (B. abortus), hepatitis (B. melitensis), and abscesses (B. suis) are seen.

The skeletal system is affected in 20–60% of cases, including arthritis (hip, knee, and ankle), spondylitis, osteomyelitis, and sacroiliitis (most common). Lumbar vertebrae can be affected showing the classical radiological sign of vertebral erosion. Neurological symptoms include meningitis, encephalitis, radiculopathy, peripheral neuropathy, intracerebral abscesses, and acute or chronic neck rigidity (<50%), and the cerebrospinal fluid can show lymphocytic pleocytosis, low sugar, increased protein, positive bacterial culture (<50%), and agglutination (positive in >95%).

Cardiovascular involvement is low (endocarditis at 2%), but is the major cause of mortality. Often, valve replacement and antibiotics are needed. Pericarditis and myocarditis are seen, too.

Pulmonary infection can be from inhalation or hematogenous sources, and can cause any chest syndrome. Rarely is Brucella isolated from sputum. Genitourinary infection can include epidydemoorchitis or pyonephrosis (rare). Cutaneous involvement is not specific. Hematological signs include anemia, leukopenia, and thrombocytopenia.

== Diagnosis ==
Brucella is isolated from a blood culture on Castaneda medium or from bone marrow. Prolonged incubation (up to six weeks) may be required, as they are slow-growing, but on modern automated machines, the cultures often show positive results within 7 days. On Gram stain, they appear as dense clumps of Gram-negative coccobacilli and are exceedingly difficult to see. In recent years, molecular diagnostic techniques based on the genetic component of the pathogen have become more popular.

Differentiating Brucella from Salmonella is crucial, as the latter could also be isolated from blood cultures and is Gram-negative. Testing for urease would successfully accomplish the task; it is positive for Brucella and negative for Salmonella. Brucella can also be seen in bone marrow biopsies.

Laboratory-acquired brucellosis is common. This most often happens when the disease is not thought of until cultures become positive, by which time the specimens have already been handled by a number of laboratory staff. The idea of preventive treatment is to stop people who have been exposed to Brucella from becoming ill with the disease. Polymerase chain reaction (PCR) shows promise for rapid diagnosis of Brucella species in human blood specimens. Positive PCR at the completion of treatment is not predictive of subsequent relapse. PCR testing for fluid and tissue samples other than blood has also been described. A history of animal contact is pivotal; in endemic area, it should be in the diagnosis of any nonspecific febrile illness.

In the laboratory, biochemical tests can be diagnostic. Oxidase and catalase tests are positive for most members of the genus Brucella.

Test	B. melitensis	B. abortus	B. suis	B. neotomae	B. ovis	B. canis
Need to CO_{2}	-	+	-	-	+	-
production of H_{2}S	-	+	+	+	-	-
Growth on basic fushin 0.002%	+	+	-	-	+	-
Growth on thionin 0.004%	-	-	+	-	+	+
Growth on thionin 0.002%	+	-	+	+	+	+
Destroy with Tb phage	-	+	-	-	-	-

Serum agglutination with a titer > 1:160 in the presence of a compatible illness supports the diagnosis of brucellosis. Demonstration of a four-fold or greater increase or decrease in agglutinating antibodies over four to 12 weeks provides even stronger evidence for the diagnosis.

ELISA is probably the second-most common serologic method. The sensitivity of the ELISA was 100% when compared with blood culture, but only 44% compared with serologic tests other than ELISA. The specificity was >99%. In a study including 75 patients with brucellosis, five patients with positive ELISA had a negative tube agglutination test. In several Brucella-endemic regions, the Febrile Antigen Brucella Agglutination Test (FBAT) is primarily used for diagnostics. Recent investigations on the use of FBAT have however illustrated its high inaccuracy in proper diagnosis, highlighting the difficulty of brucellosis control in low-income settings.

In the setting of Brucella arthritis, the synovial-fluid white blood cell count does not generally exceed 15,000 cells/μl. In brucellosis, lymphocytes frequently predominate (in contrast to septic arthritis due to other bacteria, in which polymorphonuclear leukocytes frequently predominate.

The prognosis for brucellosis before the use of antibiotics had a mortality of 2%, mainly due to endocarditis, and morbidity was high, especially with B. melitensis. Permanent nerve deafness and spinal cord damage often occurred.

Prevention now includes:

- Control of disease in domestic animals by immunization using B. abortus strain 19 and B. melitensis strain Rev 1: Vaccination in young cattle helps in protection, but does not offer full effectiveness.
- Routine pasteurization of milk
- In labs, strict biosafety precautions

As regions endemic with Brucella primarily are low-income environments, approaching proper control of brucellosis remains a challenge. A recent case-based investigation in north-eastern Kenya illustrated how community engagement with veterinarians and medical professionals might contribute in preventive strategies, but that additional political engagement is called for to ensure proper diagnostic and treatment standards.

== Treatment ==
No clinical trials exist to be relied on as a guide for optimal treatment, but an at least six-week course of rifampicin or gentamicin and doxycycline twice daily is the combination most often used, and appears to be efficacious; the advantage of this regimen is that it is oral medication with no injections; however, a high rate of side effects (nausea, vomiting, loss of appetite) has also been reported. The relatedness in treatment and endemic overlap of tuberculosis remains an issue however, as treatment of one might cause resistance in the second. Local dispensaries dealing first-hand with brucellosis are occasionally also not aware on how to treat properly, highlighting the need for reevaluation on implementation of international treatment regimes.

As of August 2013, Allison Rice-Ficht, Ph.D. at Texas A&M University and her team claim to be close to creating a human vaccine. It would primarily be used to immunize members of the military in case of exposure to weaponized Brucella on the battlefield.

== Host specificity and animal brucellosis ==
Brucella species have been found primarily in mammals:

Species	Host
B. melitensis	goats and sheep
B. abortus	cattle
B. canis	dogs
B. suis	pigs
B. ovis	sheep
B. neotomae	desert woodrat (Neotoma lepida)
B. pinnipedialis	seal
B. ceti	dolphin, porpoise, whale
B. microti	common vole (Microtus arvalis)
B. inopinata	unknown
B. papionis	baboon
B. vulpis	red fox (Vulpes vulpes)

Pathogenic Brucella species can cause abortion in female animals by colonization of placental trophoblasts, and sterility in male animals. Drugs with effects against Brucella include tetracyclines, aminoglycosides (streptomycin, [since 1947], gentamicin, netilmicin), rifampicin, quinolones (ciprofloxacin), and third-generation cephalosporins. Treatment for uncomplicated brucellosis includes:

- Streptomycin + doxycycline for 6 weeks
- TMP/SMX + doxycycline for 6 weeks
- Rifampicin + doxycycline for 6 weeks

Treatment of complicated brucellosis (endocarditis, meningitis) has no uniform agreement, but usually uses three anti-Brucella drugs for three months.

== The plague of Thebes ==
Brucellosis caused by B. abortus best fits the characteristics of the plague described in Oedipus Rex. Although the disease progression of brucellosis in modern times may make it seem unlikely, it was at least one agent in what may have been a multicomponent plague, along with Salmonella enterica serovar Typhi or another pathogen, or possibly the ancestral versions of Brucella were more lethal.

== Genomics ==
The Brucella genome includes two chromosomes; the first chromosome codes mostly for genes related to metabolism, while the second (smaller one) includes several genes related to pathogenicity. The genomes of most Brucella species have been sequenced, and typically encode 3,200 to 3,500 open reading frames (ORFs). Examples include:

1. Brucella abortus A13334, 3,401 ORFs
2. Brucella canis ATCC 23365, 3,408 ORFs
3. Brucella melitensis 16M, 3,279 ORFs
4. Brucella microti CCM 4915, 3,346 ORFs
5. Brucella ovis ATCC 25840, 3,193 ORFs
6. Brucella pinnipedialis B2/94, 3,505 ORFs
7. Brucella suis 1330, 3,408 ORFs

Genome data for these and other Brucella strains are available in the GOLD and PATRIC databases. Also, a public and editable spreadsheet of B. abortus 2308W genome annotation has been created, to be updated based on new discoveries. Also, the genome annotation is available in a user friendly table at the web page http://hdl.handle.net/11056/23125.

Bacterial small RNAs (sRNA) are an important class of regulatory molecules. Many Brucella sRNAs have been identified.

== Phylogeny ==
The currently accepted taxonomy is based on the List of Prokaryotic names with Standing in Nomenclature (LPSN). The phylogeny is based on whole-genome analysis.

- - Brucella
    - - Brucella thiophenivorans
      - - Brucella pituitosa
        - - Brucella grignonensis
          - - Brucella rhizosphaerae
            - Brucella pseudogrignonensis
    - - - Brucella intermedia
        - - Brucella lupini
          - Brucella anthropi
      - - Brucella vulpis
        - - Brucella inopinata
          - - Brucella ovis
            - - Brucella neotomae
              - - - Brucella abortus
                  - Brucella melitensis
                - - - Brucella microti
                    - Brucella ceti
                  - - Brucella suis
                    - Brucella canis
  - outgroup
    Paenochrobactrum

== Effect of blue light ==
Infection of macrophages by B. abortus is stimulated by blue light in the wild type, but is limited in photochemically inactive and null mutants, indicating a flavin-containing histidine kinase functions as a photoreceptor regulating B. abortus virulence. Conversely, depriving Brucella of the blue wavelengths dropped its reproductive rate by 90%.
