= Brucella ceti =

Scientific classification
- Domain: Bacteria
- Kingdom: Pseudomonadati
- Phylum: Pseudomonadota
- Class: Alphaproteobacteria
- Order: Hyphomicrobiales
- Family: Brucellaceae
- Genus: Brucella
- Species: B. ceti

Binomial name
- Brucella ceti Foster et al. 2007

Species of bacterium

Brucella ceti is a gram negative bacterial pathogen of the Brucellaceae family that causes brucellosis in cetaceans. Brucella ceti has been found in both classes of cetaceans, mysticetes and odontocetes. Brucellosis in some dolphins and porpoises can result in serious clinical signs including fetal abortions, male infertility, neurobrucellosis, cardiopathies, bone and skin lesions, stranding events, and death.

Brucella ceti was first isolated in 1994 when an aborted dolphin fetus was discovered. Only a small portion of those with Brucella ceti have overt clinical signs of brucellosis indicating that many have the bacteria and remain asymptomatic or overcome the pathogen. Serological surveys have shown that cetacean brucellosis may be distributed worldwide in the oceans. The likely transmission route for the bacterial pathogen in cetaceans is through mating or reproduction and lactation. Brucellosis is a zoonotic disease: marine mammal brucellosis can infect other species, including human beings.

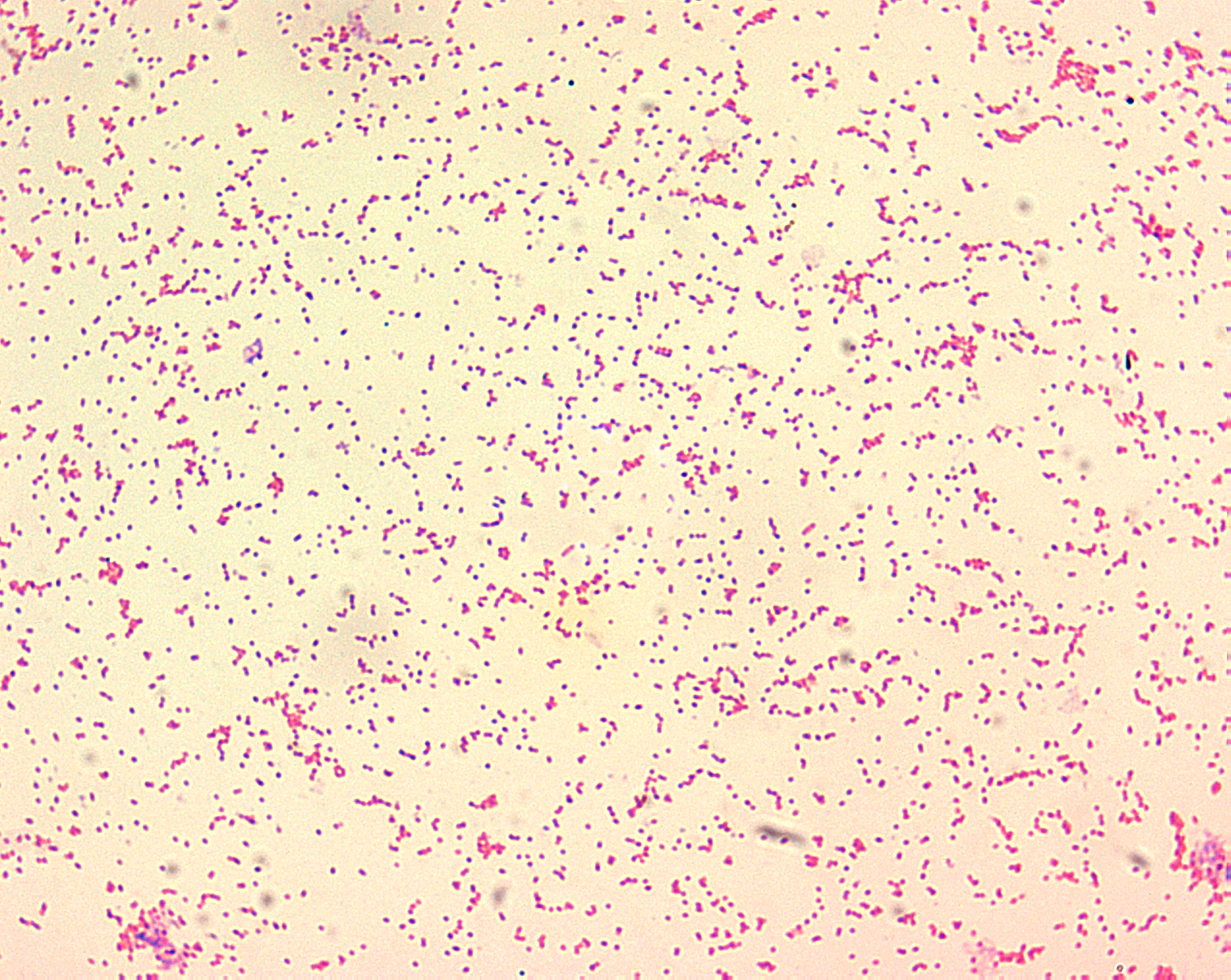
Brucella spp. are gram-negative in their staining morphology. Brucella spp. are poorly staining, small gram-negative coccobacilli (0.5-0.7 x 0.6-1.5 μm), and are seen mostly as single cells

== Bacterial characteristics ==
B. ceti is a gram negative, non motile, aerobic bacteria. The cells are cocci, coccobacilli (short rods) with a diameter of 0.5–0.7 μm and a length of 0.6–1.5 μm. The arrangement of the cells are usually singular with occasional configurations in pairs or short chains. Cell growth occurs between 20 and 40 degrees celsius with the optimum temperature of 37 degrees celsius and is improved by the presence of blood or serum, supplemental CO_{2} is not required for cell growth. The ideal pH range is between 6.6 and 6.7.

== Host range ==
B. ceti has been found via PCR isolation in 4 out of 14 cetacean families but antibodies against the bacteria have been isolated in seven families. Within these families, B. ceti has been cultured or found in Sowerby's beaked whales (Mesoplodon bidens), longfinned pilot whales (Globicephala melas), northern minke whales (Balaenoptera acutorostrata), Cuvier's beaked whale (Ziphius cavirostris), Atlantic white-sided dolphins (Lagenorhynchus acutus), harbor porpoises (Phocoena phocoena), common dolphins (Delphinus delphis), white beaked dolphins (Lagenorhynchus albirostris), striped dolphins (Stenella coeruleoalba), bottlenose dolphins (Tursiops truncatus) Hector's dolphins (Cephalorhynchus hectori), Maui's dolphins (Cephalorhynchus hectori maui), narwhales (Monodon monoceros), killer whales (Orcinus orca) and Southern right whales (Eubalaena australis)

== Clinical signs ==
The most common symptoms include spontaneous abortions, fatigue, anorexia, seizures, fainting and neurobrucellosis, which can lead to disorientation and stranding events . Other symptoms in dolphins from both the Pacific and Atlantic oceans include subcutaneous abscesses, endometritis, meningoencephalitis and discospondylitis. Post mortem pathology studies on cetaceans also find inflammatory lesions, nodules of granulation tissues and necrosis in the heart, lungs and reproductive organs. In addition to this, it is common to find non lethal lesions in the bones and joints, which indicates a chronic presence of B. ceti in cetacean populations. Only a small portion of infected individuals exhibit outwardly clinically or pathological signs.

== Diagnosis ==
Most cases of B. ceti have been isolated from stranded or dead cetaceans found on the coasts. Diagnostic tests involve isolating the bacteria then completing direct identification methods to characterize the microorganism or indirect screening tests to find antibodies using serological tests. In most cases B. ceti is detected by PCR amplification and DNA sequencing.

== Treatment ==
Captive dolphins with B. ceti have been treated with antibiotics, however, there has been no successful treatments for brucellosis documented in cetaceans.

== Transmission ==
B. ceti is a non-mobile bacteria, unable to withstand harsh conditions outside of a host. It is shown to be transmitted both horizontally through social behavior and vertically from mother to fetus. It is passed through close contact between cetaceans through sexual intercourse, reproduction and aborted fetuses. B. ceti has been found in reproductive organs and in milk produced by the host. Some cetaceans species assist others in giving birth and the bacteria could be contracted this way. Transmission could also occur from feeding on fish infected with brucellosis through reservoirs that have the ability to replicate in cetaceans.

== Epidemiology ==
B. ceti has been found to be distributed worldwide, with the first case in the Mediterranean documented in 2012. Brucellosis is a zoonotic disease that has many different strains pertaining to different host species.

There have been four confirmed cases of humans becoming infected with marine mammal brucellosis. Cetacean specific brucellosis in humans may be underestimated in African, South American and Southeast Asian countries where humans frequently come in contact with dead cetaceans.

== History ==
Brucella ceti was first isolated in 1994 when an aborted dolphin fetus was discovered. The first case of B. ceti infecting the reproductive organs was recorded in a California aquarium, where bottlenose dolphins experienced abortions. The bacteria was isolated from both the fetus and the placentas.
