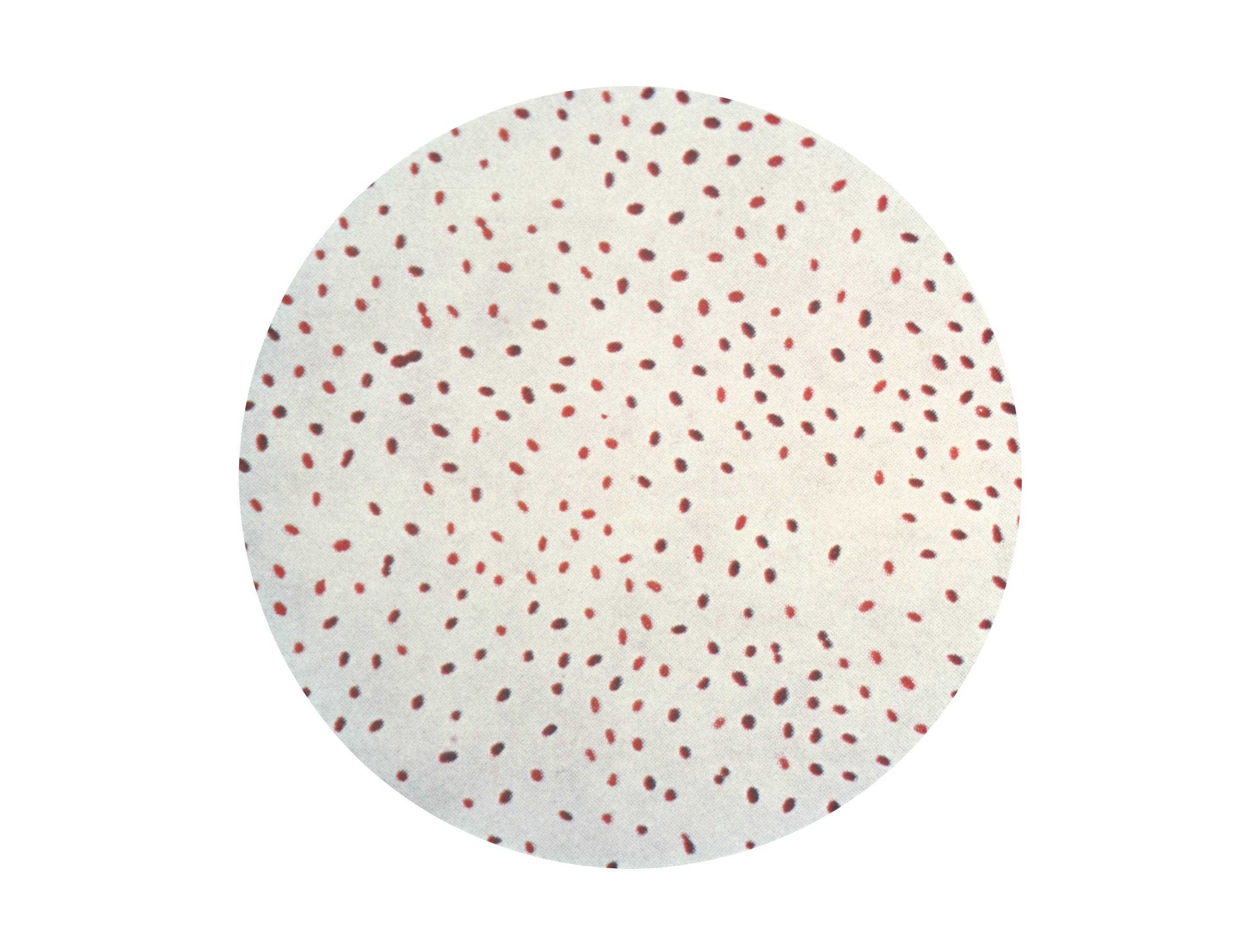
- A photomicrograph of the bacterium Brucella melitensis

Scientific classification
- Domain: Bacteria
- Kingdom: Pseudomonadati
- Phylum: Pseudomonadota
- Class: Alphaproteobacteria
- Order: Hyphomicrobiales
- Family: Brucellaceae
- Genus: Brucella
- Species: B. melitensis

Binomial name
- Brucella melitensis (Hughes 1893) Meyer and Shaw 1920 (Approved Lists 1980)

Synonyms
- Brucella neotomae

= Brucella melitensis =

Species of bacterium

Brucella melitensis is a Gram-negative coccobacillus bacterium from the Brucellaceae family. The bacterium causes ovine brucellosis, along with Brucella ovis. Humans can become infected if they have contact with an infected animal or its byproducts. Animals acquire B. melitensis by venereal transmission. The organism is found in blood, urine, milk, and semen. It is zoonotic, unlike B. ovis, causing Malta fever or localized brucellosis in humans.

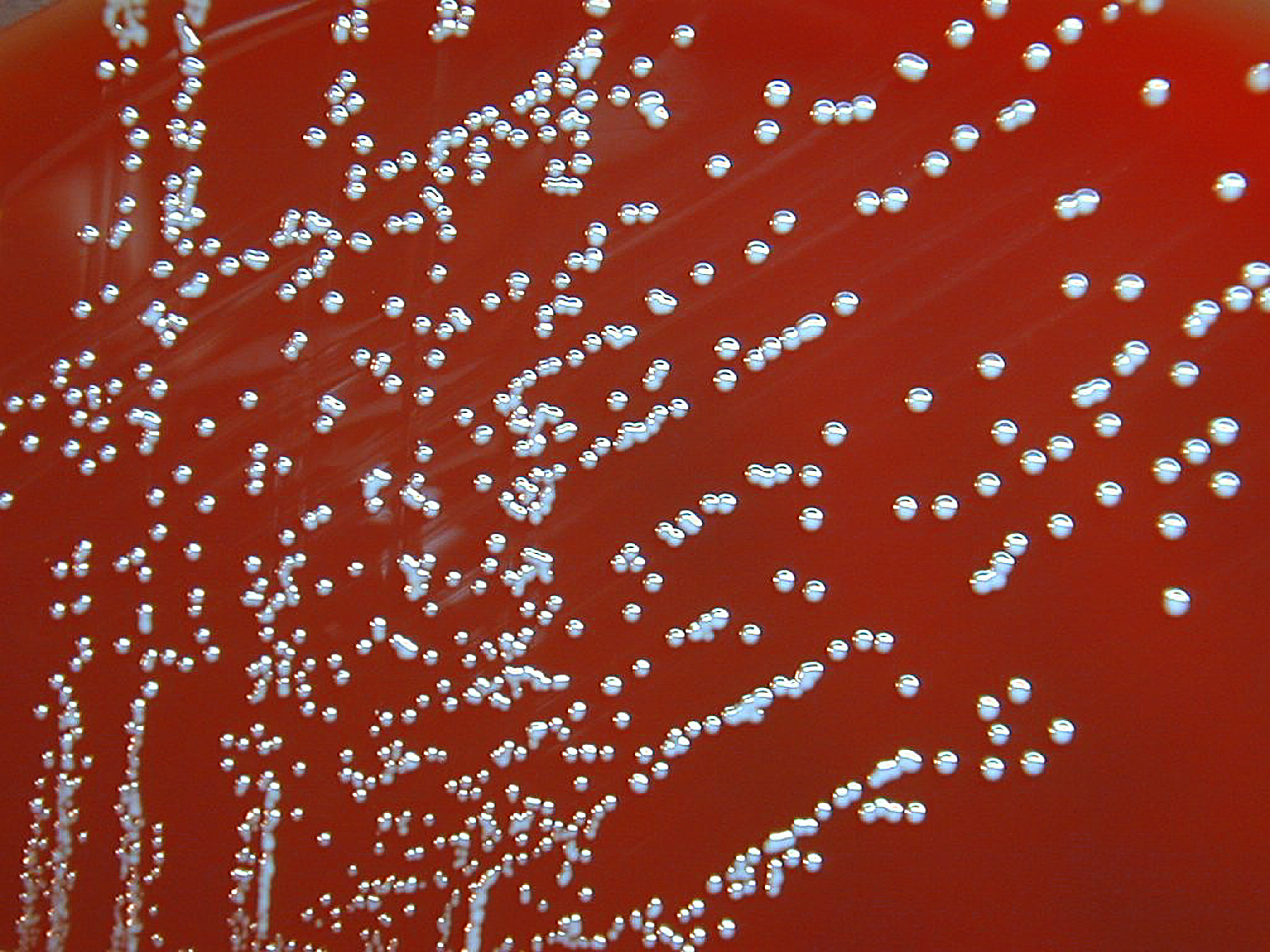
Brucella melitensis colonies growing on agar

== Clinical manifestation ==
The bacterium causes severe inflammation of the epididymis, with formation of spermatoceles and fibrinous adhesions. This disease is known as ovine brucellosis, and is a reportable disease in the USA. In goats and sheep, B. melitensis can cause abortion, stillbirth, and weak offspring for the first gestation after the animal is infected. Mastitis can happen, but is uncommon. The infection can also reduce milk yield by at least 10%. The placenta might also be retained, and the animal can suffer from purulent vaginal discharge. In males, the infection can cause acute orchitis and epididymitis, and in turn infertility. Arthritis can also occur. Brucellosis can be confirmed with the help of post mortem lesions in the reproductive tract, udders, and supramammary lymph nodes. While these are not pathognomonic for brucellosis, they can help farmers determine if their herds are infected.

== Transmission ==
=== In animals ===
Brucella melitensis is transmitted to animals through contact with the placenta, fetus, fetal fluids, and vaginal discharge of infected animals.

=== In humans ===
Brucella melitensis can be transmitted to humans through ingestion of contaminated dairy products. It can also be transmitted to humans via inhalation of the organism or by direct contact with infected animal secretions.

Human to human transmission is exceptionally rare, occurring via blood transfusion, organ and tissue transplantation, sexual contact, and breastfeeding.

== History ==
In 1887, Micrococcus melitensis was isolated in Malta by David Bruce from the spleen of a soldier who had died from acute brucellosis.

The mechanism of transmission was not determined until 1905, when Temi Żammit found that apparently healthy goats could infect humans with M. melitensis via their milk. The genus of Micrococcus was later renamed Brucella, in honor of David Bruce.

A protein found in this bacterium was detected in a 3200-year-old cheese discovered in the Tomb of Ptahmes during excavations conducted in 2013 and 2014 by archaeologists of Cairo University, with analysis performed by researchers at the University of Catania.
