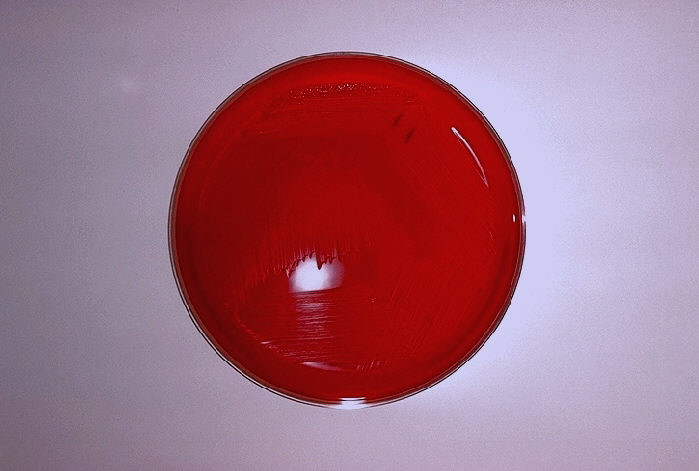
- Brucella suis culture

Scientific classification
- Domain: Bacteria
- Kingdom: Pseudomonadati
- Phylum: Pseudomonadota
- Class: Alphaproteobacteria
- Order: Hyphomicrobiales
- Family: Brucellaceae
- Genus: Brucella
- Species: B. suis

Binomial name
- Brucella suis Huddleson, 1929

= Brucella suis =

Bacterium that causes swine brucellosis

Brucella suis is a bacterium that causes swine brucellosis, a zoonosis that affects pigs. The disease typically causes chronic inflammatory lesions in the reproductive organs of susceptible animals or orchitis, and may even affect joints and other organs. The most common symptom is abortion in pregnant susceptible sows at any stage of gestation. Other manifestations are temporary or permanent sterility, lameness, posterior paralysis, spondylitis, and abscess formation. It is transmitted mainly by ingestion of infected tissues or fluids, semen during breeding, and suckling infected animals.

Since brucellosis threatens the food supply and causes undulant fever, Brucella suis and other Brucella species (B. melitensis, B. abortus, B. ovis, B. canis) are recognized as potential agricultural, civilian, and military bioterrorism agents.

== Symptoms and signs ==
The most frequent clinical sign following B. suis infection is abortion in pregnant females, reduced milk production, and infertility. Cattle can also be transiently infected when they share pasture or facilities with infected pigs, and B. suis can be transmitted by cow's milk.

Swine also develop orchitis (swelling of the testicles), lameness (movement disability), hind limb paralysis, or spondylitis (inflammation in joints).

== Cause ==
Brucella suis is a Gram-negative, facultative, intracellular coccobacillus, capable of growing and reproducing inside of host cells, specifically phagocytic cells. They are also not spore-forming, capsulated, or motile. Flagellar genes, however, are present in the B. suis genome, but are thought to be cryptic remnants because some were truncated and others were missing crucial components of the flagellar apparatus. In mouse models, the flagellum is essential for a normal infectious cycle, where the inability to assemble a complete flagellum leads to severe attenuation of the bacteria.

Brucella suis is differentiated into five biovars (strains), where biovars 1–3 infect wild boar and domestic pigs, and biovars 1 and 3 may cause severe diseases in humans. In contrast, biovar 2 found in wild boars in Europe shows mild or no clinical signs and cannot infect healthy humans, but does infect pigs and hares.

== Pathogenesis ==
Phagocytes are an essential component of the host's innate immune system with various antimicrobial defense mechanisms to clear pathogens by oxidative burst, acidification of phagosomes, and fusion of the phagosome and lysosome. B. suis, in return, has developed ways to counteract the host cell defense to survive in the macrophage and to deter host immune responses.

B. suis possesses smooth lipopolysaccharide (LPS), which has a full-length O-chain, as opposed to rough LPS, which has a truncated or no O-chain. This structural characteristic allows for B. suis to interact with lipid rafts on the surface of macrophages to be internalized, and the formed lipid-rich phagosome is able to avoid fusion with lysosomes through this endocytic pathway. In addition, this furtive entry into macrophages does not affect the cell's normal trafficking. The smooth LPS also inhibits host cell apoptosis by O-polysaccharides through a TNF-alpha-independent mechanism, which allows for B. suis to avoid the activation of the host immune system.

Once inside macrophages, B. suis is able to endure the rapid acidification in the phagosome to pH 4.0–4.5 by expressing metabolism genes mainly for amino acid synthesis. The acidic pH is actually essential for replication of the bacteria by inducing major virulence genes of the virB operon and the synthesis of DnaK chaperones. DnaK is part of the heat shock protein 70 family, and aids in the correct synthesis and activation of certain virulence factors.

In addition, the B. suis gene for nickel transport, nikA, is activated by metal ion deficiency and is expressed once in the phagosome. Nickel is essential for many enzymatic reactions, including ureolysis to produce ammonia which in turn may neutralize acidic pH. Since B. suis is unable to grow in a strongly acidic medium, it could be protected from acidification by the ammonia.

Summary:

- Brucella suis encounters a macrophage, but no oxidative burst occurs.
- Lipid rafts are necessary for macrophage penetration.
- The phagosome rapidly acidifies, creating a stressful environment for bacteria, which triggers activation of virulence genes.
- Lipid rafts on phagosomes prevent lysosomal fusion, and normal cell trafficking is unaffected.

== Treatment ==
Because B. suis is facultative and intracellular, and is able to adapt to environmental conditions in macrophages, treatment failure and relapse rates are high. The only effective way to control and eradicate zoonosis is by vaccination of all susceptible hosts and elimination of infected animals. The Brucella abortus (rough LPS Brucella) vaccine, developed for bovine brucellosis and licensed by the USDA Animal Plant Health Inspection Service, has shown protection for some swine and is also effective against B. suis infection, but there is currently no approved vaccine for swine brucellosis.

== Biological warfare ==
In the United States, B. suis was the first biological agent weaponized in 1952, and was field-tested with B. suis-filled bombs called M33 cluster bombs. It is, however, considered to be one of the agents of lesser threat because many infections are asymptomatic and the mortality is low, but it is used more as an incapacitating agent.
