= Brucella pituitosa =

Scientific classification
- Domain: Bacteria
- Kingdom: Pseudomonadati
- Phylum: Pseudomonadota
- Class: Alphaproteobacteria
- Order: Hyphomicrobiales
- Family: Brucellaceae
- Genus: Brucella
- Species: B. pituitosa

Binomial name
- Brucella pituitosa (Huber et al. 2010) Hördt et al. 2020

Type strain
- CCBS-0049/05, CCUG 50899, DSM 22207

Synonyms
- Ochrobactrum pituitosum Huber et al. 2010

Species of bacterium

Brucella pituitosa is a gram-negative, oxidase-positive and catalase-positive, non-spore-forming, non-motile bacteria from the genus Brucella which was isolated from industrial environment in Sweden.
