= Paenochrobactrum =

Scientific classification
- Domain: Bacteria
- Kingdom: Pseudomonadati
- Phylum: Pseudomonadota
- Class: Alphaproteobacteria
- Order: Hyphomicrobiales
- Family: Brucellaceae
- Genus: Paenochrobactrum; Kämpfer et al. 2010

Type species
- Paenochrobactrum gallinarii

Species
- Paenochrobactrum gallinarii Paenochrobactrum glaciei Paenochrobactrum pullorum

Genus of bacteria

Paenochrobactrum is a genus of Gram-negative, oxidase-positive, non-spore-forming, nonmotile bacteria from the family Brucellaceae.
