= Tomb of Ptahmes =

Sepulchre in the necropolis of Saqqara, Egypt

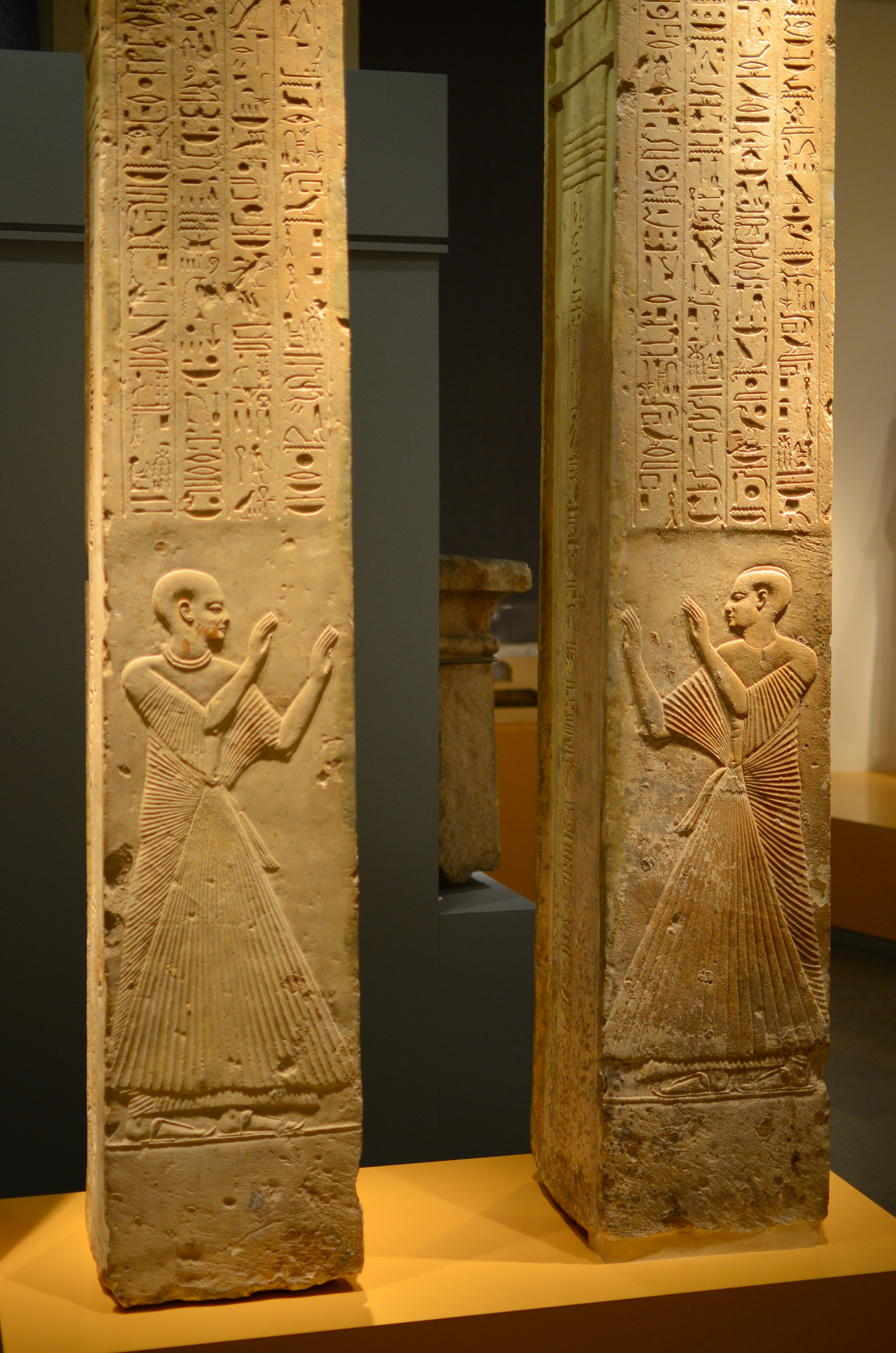
Two of the four pillars from the Tomb of Ptahmes in the Rijksmuseum van Oudheden in Leiden, the Netherlands.

The Tomb of Ptahmes is a sepulchre in the necropolis of Saqqara, Egypt. Located on the side of the Pyramid of Unas, it was built in the 13th century BC during the 19th Dynasty of the New Kingdom of Egypt. The tomb belonged to Ptahmes, a high-ranking official under pharaoh Seti I and his successor Ramesses II.

== Discovery ==
The tomb was discovered by treasure hunters in 1885. Most of the tomb's artifacts ended up in museums in the Netherlands, Italy and the United States. Its location was not recorded however, so knowledge of its position was lost when it was again covered over time by the desert sands. It was rediscovered in 2010 by archaeologists from Cairo University. They discovered more artifacts which include several stelas (grave markers) including an unfinished image of Ptahmes himself. Another shows his family before the Theban Triad of Amun, Mut and Khonsu, three deities popular at the time. A painted head of Ptahmes' daughter or wife was also found, alongside shabti figurines, amulets and clay vessels. Ptahmes' sarcophagus has not yet been found and work continues to find the tomb's main shaft and burial chamber.

Several broken jars were found on the site. In some of them the contained solidified material was analyzed through advanced proteomic techniques by scientists of the University of Catania in Italy in collaboration with the archaeologists of the Cairo University. The results showed that the content was probably a hard cheese of bovine and sheep-goat origin. At the time of analyses, it was found to be the oldest solid cheese ever discovered and analyzed with modern scientific and technical protocols. This makes the site notable in the history of the evolution of food technology.

== Layout ==
The tomb is over 70 meters long and features several chapels. During the Christian period of Egypt some of its pillars were reused for churches. Its walls were damaged when it was accessed in 1885.

== Ptahmes ==
The hieroglyphs in the tomb state that Ptahmes held several important titles during the reign of Seti I, which include mayor of Egypt's capital city Memphis, army chief, overseer of the treasury and royal scribe under Seti I. Under Seti I's son Ramesses II he was promoted to the office of High Priest of Amun at Karnak.

== Sources ==
- Greco, Enrico (25 July 2018). "Proteomic Analyses on an Ancient Egyptian Cheese and Biomolecular Evidence of Brucellosis". Analytical Chemistry. doi:10.1021/acs.analchem.8b02535.
- Whipple, Tom (17 August 2018). "Pharaoh's big cheese was dying for a snack". The Times.
- Williams, Sean (1 June 2010). "Lost tomb of ancient Egyptian official Ptahmes re-discovered". The Independent.
