= Brucellosis =

Human and animal disease

- Other names: undulant fever, undulating fever, Mediterranean fever, Malta fever, Cyprus fever, rock fever (Micrococcus melitensis)
- Specialty: Infectious disease
- Symptoms: fever, chills, loss of appetite, sweats, weakness, fatigue, joint pain, muscle pain, back pain, headache.
- Complications: central nervous system infections (meningitis, encephalitis), inflammation and infection of the spleen and liver, infection and inflammation of the epididymus and testicles (epididymo-orchitis), arthritis, inflammation of the inner lining of the heart chambers (endocarditis).
- Causes: Ingestion of bacteria within the genus Brucella
- Diagnostic method: x-rays, computerized tomography (CT) scan or magnetic resonance imaging (MRI), cerebrospinal fluid culture, echocardiography.
- Prevention: avoid unpasteurized dairy foods, cook meat thoroughly, wear gloves, take safety precautions in high-risk workplaces, vaccinate domestic animals.
- Treatment: antibiotics
- Medication: doxycycline, rifampicin, aminoglycosides
- Frequency: 0.0001%

Brucellosis is a zoonotic disease spread primarily via ingestion of unpasteurized milk from infected animals. It is also known as undulant fever, Malta fever, and Mediterranean fever.

The causative agents, Brucella, are small, Gram-negative, nonmotile, nonspore-forming, rod-shaped (coccobacilli) bacteria. They function as facultative intracellular parasites, and can cause lifelong chronic disease. Four species infect humans: B. abortus, B. canis, B. melitensis, and B. suis. B. abortus is less virulent than B. melitensis and is primarily a disease of cattle. B. canis affects dogs. B. melitensis is the most virulent and invasive species; it usually infects goats and occasionally sheep. B. suis is of intermediate virulence and chiefly infects pigs. Symptoms include profuse sweating and joint and muscle pain. Brucellosis has been recognized in animals and humans since the early 20th century.

== Signs and symptoms ==
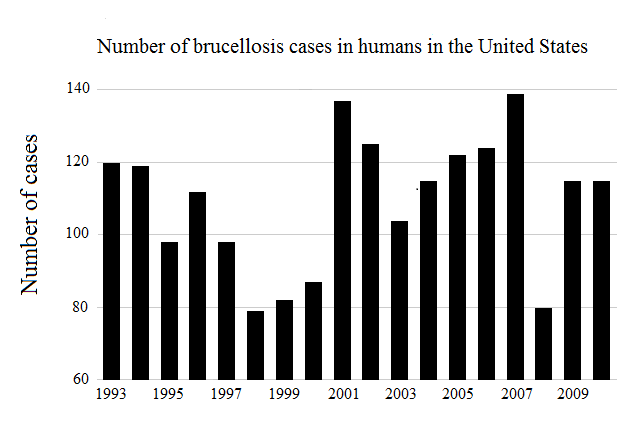
A graph of the cases of brucellosis in humans in the United States from the years 1993–2010 surveyed by the Centers for Disease Control and Prevention through the National Notifiable Diseases Surveillance System

Symptoms of brucellosis are described as flu-like, often consisting of fever, chills, anorexia, headaches, vomiting, diarrhea, abdominal pain, joint and muscle aches, and malaise.

Brucellosis can result in sacroiliitis, miscarriage, osteomyelitis, spondylodiscitis, septic arthritis, orchitis, and epidural abscesses. Neurological symptoms (neurobrucellosis) and endocarditis are rare complications of brucellosis; however, endocarditis is the most common cause of death from brucellosis.

== Cause ==
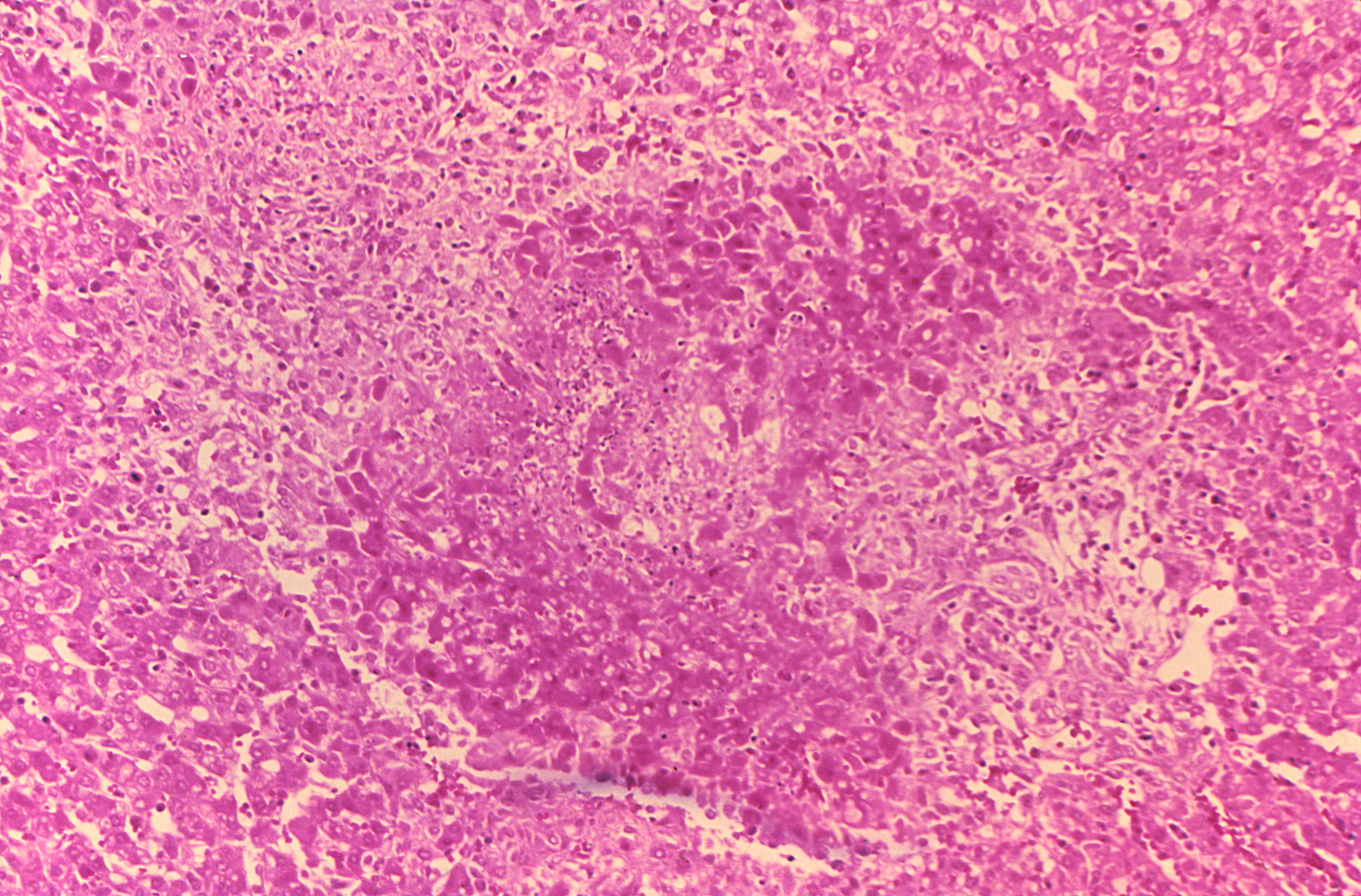
Granuloma and necrosis in the liver of a guinea pig infected with Brucella suis

Brucellosis in humans is usually associated with consumption of unpasteurized milk and soft cheeses made from the milk of infected animals—often goats—infected with B. melitensis, and with occupational exposure of laboratory workers, veterinarians, and slaughterhouse workers. These infected animals may be healthy and asymptomatic. Some vaccines used in livestock, most notably B. abortus strain 19, also cause disease in humans if accidentally injected. Brucellosis induces inconstant fevers, miscarriage, sweating, weakness, anemia, headaches, depression, and muscular and bodily pain. The other strains, B. suis and B. canis, cause infection in pigs and dogs, respectively.

Overall findings support that brucellosis poses an occupational risk to goat farmers with specific areas of concern including weak awareness of disease transmission to humans and lack of knowledge on specific safe farm practices such as quarantine practices.

=== Wildlife reservoirs and zoonotic transmission ===
Brucellosis affects both domestic and wildlife species, with the latter serving as significant reservoirs that contribute to disease persistence and transmission. Notably, bison, elk, wild boars, and deer have been identified as carriers, particularly in North America and Europe Humans can contract the disease through direct handling of infected animals, aerosol exposure, or consumption of undercooked game meat. Additionally, the wildlife trade has been implicated in the geographical spread of brucellosis, as the movement and sale of infected animals, particularly in unregulated markets, introduce the bacteria into new ecosystems, increasing disease risks for both humans and animals. Reports from Central Asia and sub-Saharan Africa highlight cases where wildlife trafficking has facilitated brucellosis outbreaks in non-endemic regions.

=== Transmission through hunting and game meat consumption ===
Hunters and individuals who consume wild game face an elevated risk of brucellosis exposure due to direct contact with infected animals and inadequate meat preparation. Transmission can occur during field-dressing or handling of infected carcasses, as Brucella bacteria can enter the body through skin abrasions, mucous membranes, or inhalation of aerosolized pathogens. Additionally, the consumption of undercooked or improperly handled wild game meat remains a significant risk factor, particularly in regions where game animals constitute a primary food source. Implementing protective measures, such as the use of personal protective equipment (PPE) during handling and ensuring thorough cooking of game meat, is essential to mitigating the risk of brucellosis transmission within hunting communities.

== Diagnosis ==
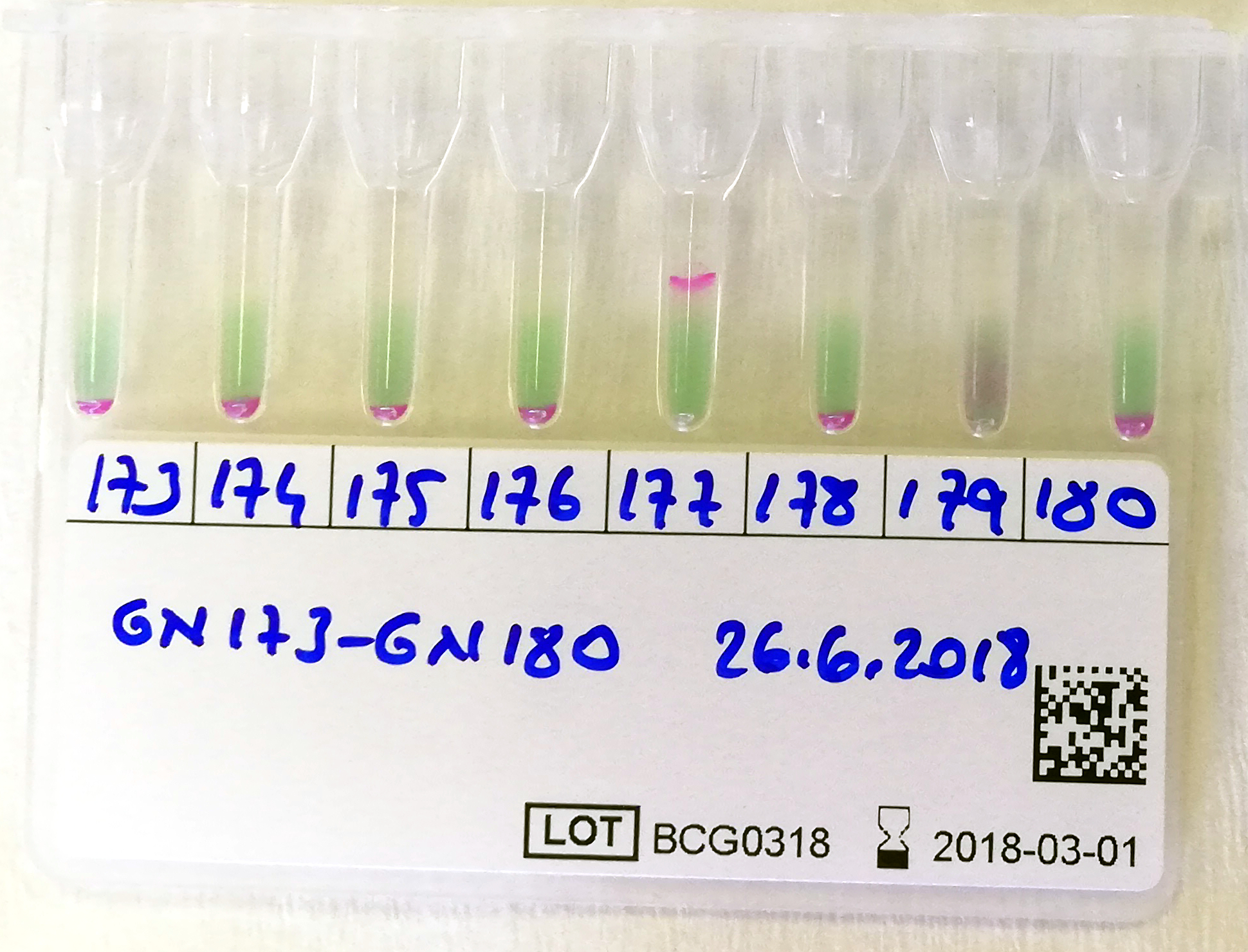
Brucella Coombs Gel Test. Seropositivity detected to GN177

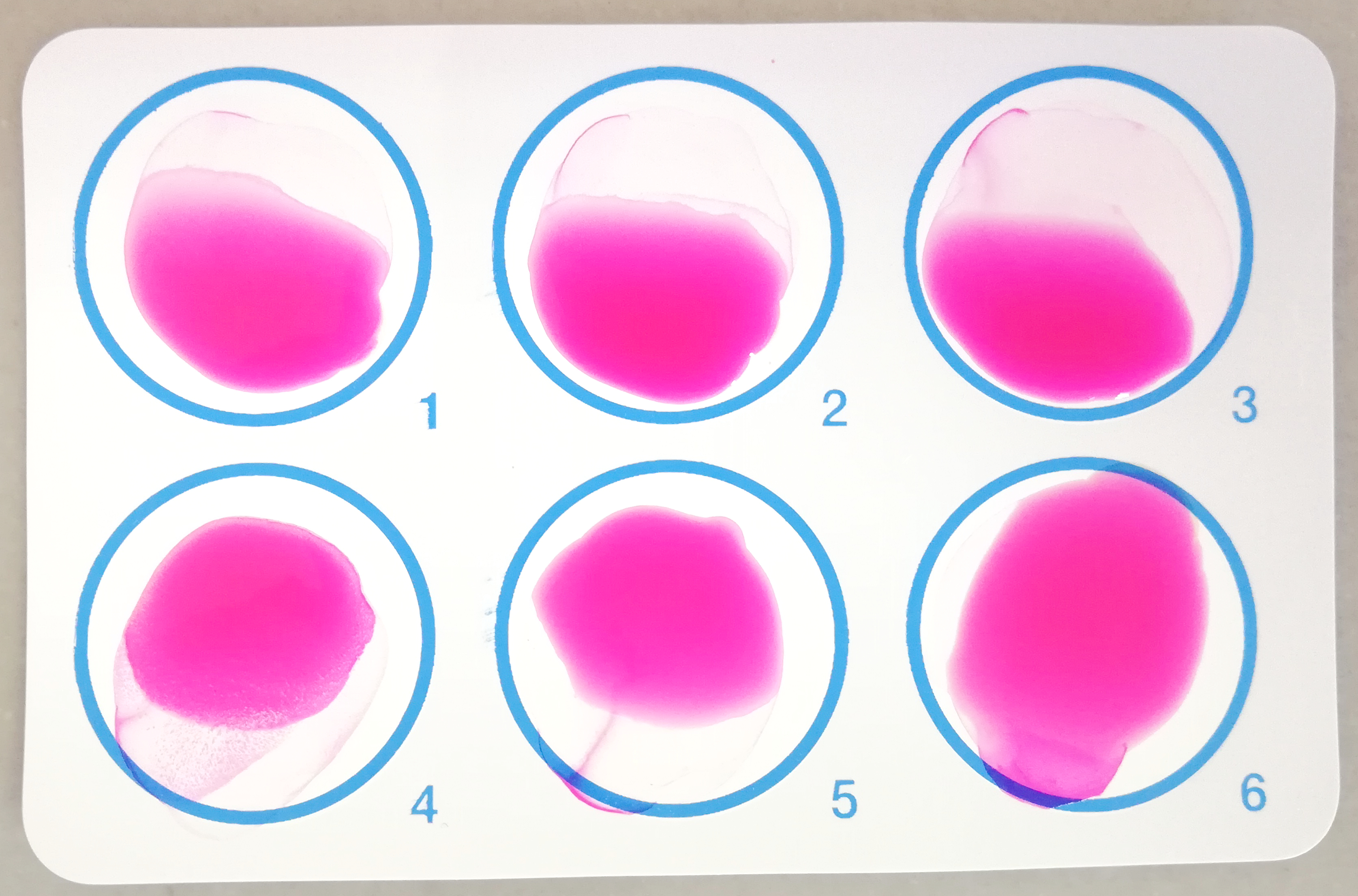
Rose Bengal Plate Test.

The diagnosis of brucellosis relies on:

1. Demonstration of the agent: blood cultures in tryptose broth, bone marrow cultures. The growth of brucellae is extremely slow (they can take up to two months to grow), and the culture poses a risk to laboratory personnel due to the high infectivity of brucellae.
2. Demonstration of antibodies against the agent, either with the classic Huddleson, Wright, and/or Bengal Rose reactions, either with ELISA or the 2-mercaptoethanol assay for IgM antibodies associated with chronic disease
3. Histologic evidence of granulomatous hepatitis on hepatic biopsy
4. Radiologic alterations in infected vertebrae: the Pedro Pons sign (preferential erosion of the anterosuperior corner of lumbar vertebrae) and marked osteophytosis are suspicious of brucellic spondylitis.

Definite diagnosis of brucellosis requires the isolation of the organism from the blood, body fluids, or tissues, but serological methods may be the only tests available in many settings. Positive blood culture yield ranges between 40 and 70% and is less commonly positive for B. abortus than B. melitensis or B. suis. Identification of specific antibodies against bacterial lipopolysaccharide and other antigens can be detected by the standard agglutination test (SAT), rose Bengal, 2-mercaptoethanol (2-ME), antihuman globulin (Coombs') and indirect enzyme-linked immunosorbent assay (ELISA). SAT is the most commonly used serology in endemic areas. An agglutination titre greater than 1:160 is considered significant in nonendemic areas and greater than 1:320 in endemic areas.

Due to the similarity of the O polysaccharide of Brucella to that of various other Gram-negative bacteria (e.g. Francisella tularensis, Escherichia coli, Salmonella urbana, Yersinia enterocolitica, Vibrio cholerae, and Stenotrophomonas maltophilia), the appearance of cross-reactions of class M immunoglobulins may occur. The inability to diagnose B. canis by SAT due to lack of cross-reaction is another drawback. False-negative SAT may be caused by the presence of blocking antibodies (the prozone phenomenon) in the α2-globulin (IgA) and in the α-globulin (IgG) fractions.

Dipstick assays are new and promising, based on the binding of Brucella IgM antibodies, and are simple, accurate, and rapid. ELISA typically uses cytoplasmic proteins as antigens. It measures IgM, IgG, and IgA with better sensitivity and specificity than the SAT in most recent comparative studies. The commercial Brucellacapt test, a single-step immunocapture assay for the detection of total anti-Brucella antibodies, is an increasingly used adjunctive test when resources permit. PCR is fast and should be specific. Many varieties of PCR have been developed (e.g., nested PCR, real-time PCR, and PCR-ELISA) and found to have superior specificity and sensitivity in detecting both primary infection and relapse after treatment. Unfortunately, these are not standardized for routine use, and some centres have reported persistent PCR positivity after clinically successful treatment, fuelling the controversy about the existence of prolonged chronic brucellosis.

Other laboratory findings include normal peripheral white cell count, and occasional leucopenia with relative lymphocytosis. The serum biochemical profiles are commonly normal.

== Prevention ==
Prevention of human brucellosis depends largely on controlling infection in animals and reducing exposure to contaminated animal products and animal tissues. Common public health measures include pasteurization of milk, avoidance of raw dairy products, use of protective clothing when handling potentially infected animals or animal tissues, and biosafety precautions in laboratories.

In areas where brucellosis is endemic in livestock, prevention strategies may include animal vaccination, testing, surveillance, movement control, and culling of infected herds where feasible. People at increased occupational risk, including veterinarians, farmers, slaughterhouse workers, hunters, and laboratory personnel, are advised to use personal protective equipment and avoid unprotected contact with placentas, fetuses, blood, and other potentially infectious materials. There is no widely available human vaccine for brucellosis, so prevention in humans relies primarily on food safety, occupational precautions, and control of the disease in animal populations.

=== Livestock vaccination and disease surveillance ===
Vaccination is the most effective method for controlling brucellosis in livestock. In cattle, the most common vaccines are Brucella abortus strain 19 and RB51, while for goats and sheep, B. melitensis Rev-1 is used. Other methods include regular serological screening, and the culling of infected animals helps prevent the spread of disease. In many countries, mandatory vaccination programs and test-and-slaughter policies have been shown to significantly reduce brucellosis incidence in livestock populations.

=== Food safety and pasteurization ===
Brucellosis is commonly transmitted to humans through the consumption of unpasteurized dairy products, particularly raw milk and cheese. Pasteurization is one of the most effective methods to eliminate Brucella with many countries implementing it while hosting public educational campaigns to discourage the consumption of raw dairy.

=== Wildlife reservoirs and disease control ===
Wild animals, including bison, elk, wild boars, and deer, serve as natural reservoirs for Brucella. Spillover infections from wildlife to livestock pose ongoing challenges, particularly in regions with dairy farms. Control measures include restricted feeding areas, selective culling, and experimental wildlife vaccination programs. Hunters and individuals handling game meat are advised to wear protective gloves and cook meat thoroughly to prevent infection.

=== Occupational safety and laboratory precautions ===
Brucellosis poses an occupational hazard for veterinarians, farmers, slaughterhouse workers, and laboratory personnel who handle infected animals or biological specimens. Common preventive measures include the use of personal protective equipment (PPE), proper ventilation in slaughterhouses, and adherence to laboratory biosafety protocols. Accidental exposure in laboratory settings can occur through aerosolized bacteria or direct contact with infected samples, necessitating post-exposure antibiotic prophylaxis.

=== Public health education and community awareness ===
Educational initiatives are essential to reducing brucellosis transmission, particularly in rural communities where unpasteurized dairy products remain widely consumed. Public health campaigns emphasize the importance of basic knowledge of brucellosis disease and transmission, safe food handling, and vaccination compliance.

=== International disease control efforts and One Health integration ===
Brucellosis control relies on a One Health approach integrating human, animal, and environmental health. Global organizations, including the World Health Organization (WHO), Food and Agriculture Organization (FAO), World Organisation for Animal Health (WOAH), and the United Nations Environment Programme (UNEP), advocate for integrated strategies to manage health threats across humans, animals, plants, and the environment, to prevent prevent future pandemics. Collaborative efforts to identify risk factors enhances outbreak surveillance, livestock vaccination programs, and food safety regulations such as mandatory pasteurization, ensuring a sustainable and comprehensive approach disease management.

Brucellosis is often regarded as a One Health issue because transmission occurs at the interface of humans, animals, food systems, and the environment. Human prevention relies heavily on veterinary surveillance, control of infection in livestock, food-safety measures such as milk pasteurization, and occupational precautions for people who work with animals or animal tissues.

== Treatment ==
Antibiotics such as tetracyclines, rifampicin, and the aminoglycosides streptomycin and gentamicin are effective against Brucella bacteria. However, the use of more than one antibiotic is needed for several weeks, because the bacteria incubate within cells.

The gold standard treatment for adults is daily intramuscular injections of streptomycin 1g for 14 days and oral doxycycline 100 mg twice daily for 45 days (concurrently). Gentamicin 5 mg/kg by intramuscular injection once daily for 7 days is an acceptable substitute when streptomycin is not available or contraindicated. Another widely used regimen is doxycycline plus rifampicin twice daily for at least 6 weeks. This regimen has the advantage of oral administration. A triple therapy of doxycycline, with rifampicin and co-trimoxazole, has been used successfully to treat neurobrucellosis. Doxycycline plus streptomycin regimen (for 2 to 3 weeks) is more effective than doxycycline plus rifampicin regimen (for 6 weeks).

Doxycycline can cross the blood–brain barrier, but requires the addition of two other drugs to prevent relapse. Ciprofloxacin and co-trimoxazole therapy are associated with an unacceptably high rate of relapse. In brucellic endocarditis, surgery to remove bacteria-harboring vegetations on the valves of the heart, or full replacement of damaged valve flaps, is required for an optimal outcome. Even with optimal antibrucellic therapy, relapses still occur in 5 to 15% of patients with Malta fever.

== Prognosis ==
The mortality of the disease in 1909, as recorded in the British Army and Navy stationed in Malta, was 2%. The most frequent cause of death was endocarditis. Recent advances in antibiotics and surgery have been successful in preventing death due to endocarditis. Prevention of human brucellosis can be achieved by eradication of the disease in animals by vaccination and other veterinary control methods, such as testing herds/flocks and slaughtering animals when infection is present. Currently, no effective vaccine is available for humans. Boiling milk before consumption, or before using it to produce other dairy products, is protective against transmission via ingestion. Changing the traditional food habits of eating raw meat, liver, or bone marrow is necessary, but difficult to implement. Patients who have had brucellosis should probably be excluded indefinitely from donating blood or organs. Exposure of diagnostic laboratory personnel to Brucella organisms remains a problem in both endemic settings and when brucellosis is unknowingly imported by a patient. After appropriate risk assessment, staff with significant exposure should be offered postexposure prophylaxis and followed up serologically for 6 months.

== Epidemiology ==
=== Argentina ===
According to a study published in 2002, an estimated 10–13% of farm animals were infected with Brucella species. Annual losses from the disease were calculated at around US$60 million. Since 1932, government agencies have undertaken efforts to contain the disease. As of 2022, all cattle aged 3–8 months must receive the Brucella abortus strain 19 vaccine.

=== Australia ===
Australia is free of cattle brucellosis, although it occurred in the past. Brucellosis of sheep or goats has never been reported. Brucellosis of pigs does occur. Feral pigs are the typical source of human infections.

=== Canada ===
On 19 September 1985, the Canadian government declared its cattle population brucellosis-free. Brucellosis ring testing of milk and cream, and testing of cattle to be slaughtered, ended on 1 April 1999. Monitoring continues through testing at auction markets, through standard disease-reporting procedures, and testing of cattle being qualified for export to countries other than the United States.

=== China ===
An outbreak infecting humans took place in Lanzhou in 2019 after the Lanzhou Biopharmaceutical Plant, which was involved in vaccine production, accidentally pumped out the bacteria into the atmosphere in exhaust air due to use of expired disinfectant.

According to Georgios Pappas, an infectious-disease specialist and author of a report published in the journal Clinical Infectious Diseases, the result was "possibly the largest laboratory accident in the history of infectious diseases." According to Pappas, out of nearly 70,000 people tested, more than 10,000 were seropositive, citing figures compiled by the provincial health authorities in Lanzhou's Gansu province. Pappas also states that Chinese documents show that more than 3,000 people living near the plant applied for compensation, an indication of at least a mild illness.

=== Europe ===
Disease incidence map of B. melitensis infections in animals in Europe during the first half of 2006 never reported not reported in this period confirmed clinical disease confirmed infection no information

==== Malta ====
Until the early 20th century, the disease was endemic in Malta to the point of it being referred to as "Maltese fever". Since 2005, due to a strict regimen of certification of milk animals and widespread use of pasteurization, the illness has been eradicated from Malta.

==== Republic of Ireland ====
Ireland was declared free of brucellosis on 1 July 2009. It had troubled the country's farmers and veterinarians for several decades. The Irish government submitted an application to the European Commission, which verified that Ireland had been liberated. Brendan Smith, Ireland's then Minister for Agriculture, Food and the Marine, said the elimination of brucellosis was "a landmark in the history of disease eradication in Ireland". Ireland's Department of Agriculture, Food and the Marine intends to reduce its brucellosis eradication programme now that eradication has been confirmed.

==== UK ====
Mainland Britain has been free of brucellosis since 1979, although there have been episodic reintroductions since. The last outbreak of brucellosis in Great Britain was in cattle in Cornwall in 2004. Northern Ireland was declared officially brucellosis-free in 2015.

=== New Zealand ===
Brucellosis in New Zealand is limited to sheep (B. ovis). The country is free of all other species of Brucella.

=== United States ===
Dairy herds in the U.S. are tested at least once a year to be certified brucellosis-free with the Brucella milk ring test. Cows confirmed to be infected are often killed. In the United States, states decide whether veterinarians are required to vaccinate all young stock, to further reduce the chance of zoonotic transmission. This vaccination is usually referred to as a "calfhood" vaccination. Most cattle receive a tattoo in one of their ears, serving as proof of their vaccination status. This tattoo also includes the last digit of the year they were born.

The first state–federal cooperative efforts towards eradication of brucellosis caused by B. abortus in the U.S. began in 1934.

Brucellosis was originally imported to North America with non-native domestic cattle (Bos taurus), which transmitted the disease to wild bison (Bison bison) and elk (Cervus canadensis). No records exist of brucellosis in ungulates native to America until the early 19th century.

== History ==
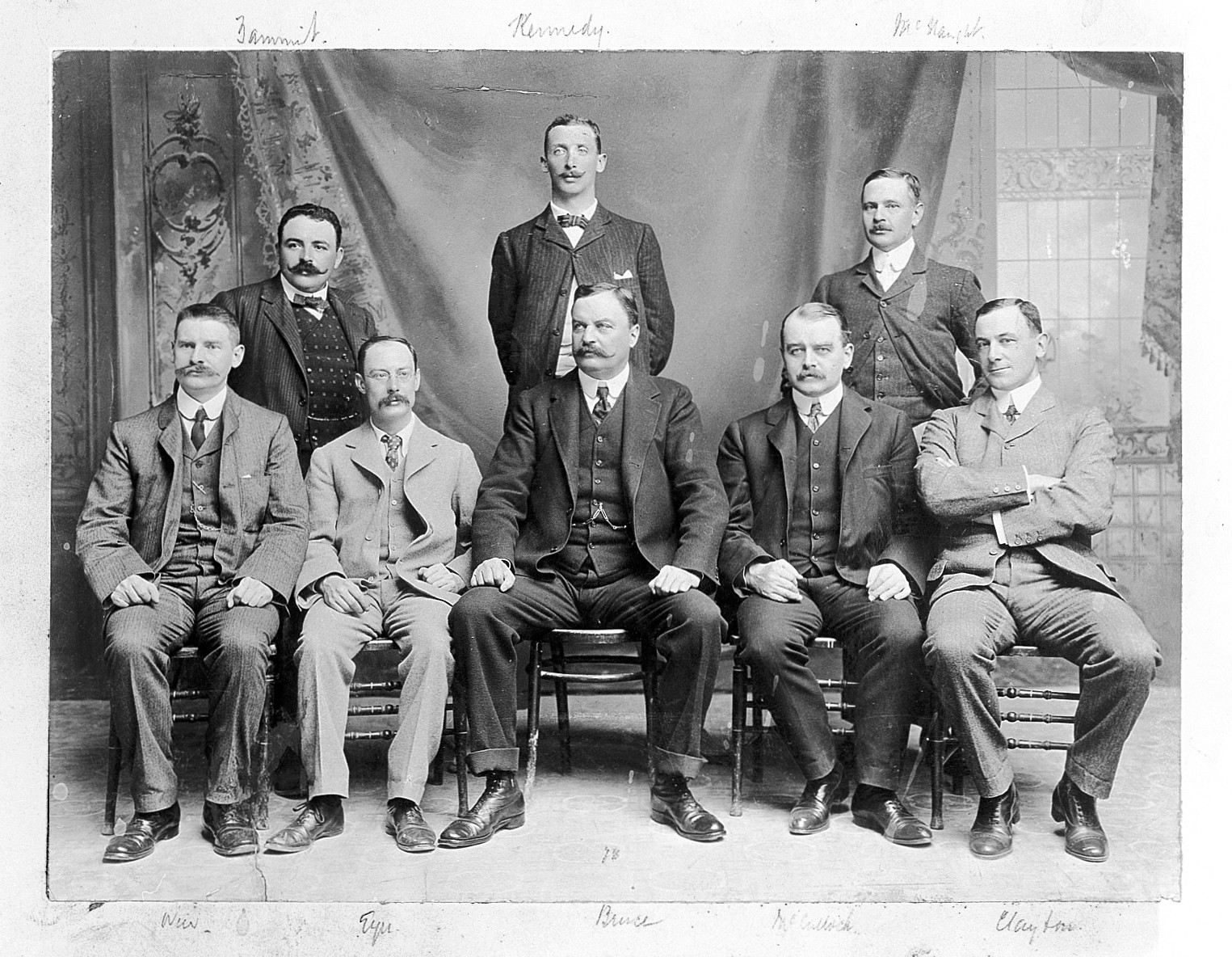
David Bruce (centre), with members of the Mediterranean Fever Commission (Brucellosis)

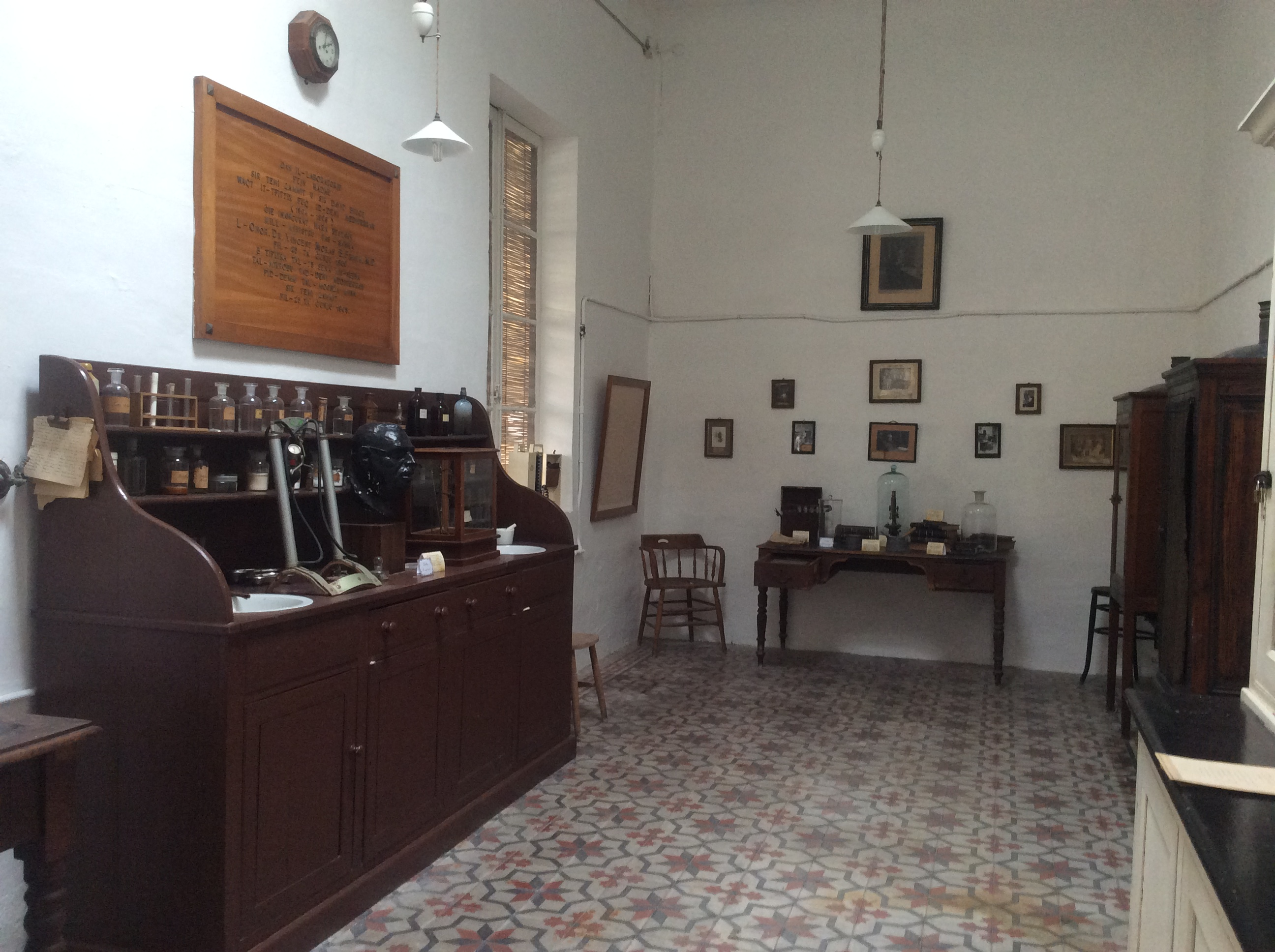
The lab in which Sir Themistocles Zammit and the Mediterranean Fever Commission carried out research about brucellosis from 1904 to 1906 is located within the Castellania in Valletta, Malta.

Brucellosis first came to the attention of British medical officers in the 1850s in Malta during the Crimean War, and was referred to as Malta Fever. Jeffery Allen Marston (1831–1911) described his case of the disease in 1861. The causal relationship between organism and disease was first established in 1887 by David Bruce. Bruce considered the agent spherical and classified it as a coccus.

In 1897, Danish veterinarian Bernhard Bang isolated a bacillus as the agent of heightened spontaneous abortion in cows, and the name "Bang's disease" was assigned to this condition. Bang considered the organism rod-shaped and classified it as a bacillus. At the time, no one knew that this bacillus had anything to do with the causative agent of Malta fever.

Maltese scientist and archaeologist Themistocles Zammit identified unpasteurized goat milk as the major etiologic factor of undulant fever in June 1905. In 1907 a report by Bruce, after three years' work by a government commission, showed that goats' milk from Malta was indeed the source of the disease.

In the late 1910s, American bacteriologist Alice C. Evans was studying the Bang bacillus and gradually realized that it was virtually indistinguishable from the Bruce coccus. The short-rod versus oblong-round morphologic borderline explained the leveling of the erstwhile bacillus/coccus distinction (that is, these "two" pathogens were not a coccus versus a bacillus but rather were one coccobacillus). The Bang bacillus was already known to be enzootic in American dairy cattle, which showed itself in the regularity with which herds experienced contagious abortion. Having made the discovery that the bacteria were certainly nearly identical and perhaps totally so, Evans then wondered why Malta fever was not widely diagnosed or reported in the United States. She began to wonder whether many cases of vaguely defined febrile illnesses were in fact caused by the drinking of raw (unpasteurized) milk. During the 1920s, this hypothesis was vindicated. Such illnesses ranged from undiagnosed and untreated gastrointestinal upset to misdiagnosed febrile and painful versions, some even fatal. This advance in bacteriological science sparked extensive changes in the American dairy industry to improve food safety. The changes included making pasteurization standard and greatly tightening the standards of cleanliness in milkhouses on dairy farms. The expense prompted delay and skepticism in the industry, but the new hygiene rules eventually became the norm. Although these measures have sometimes struck people as overdone in the decades since, being unhygienic at milking time or in the milkhouse, or drinking raw milk, is not a safe alternative.

In the decades after Evans's work, this genus, which received the name Brucella in honor of Bruce, was found to contain several species with varying virulence. The name "brucellosis" gradually replaced the 19th-century names Mediterranean fever and Malta fever.

Neurobrucellosis, a neurological involvement in brucellosis, was first described in 1879. In the late 19th century, its symptoms were described in more detail by M. Louis Hughes, a Surgeon-Captain of the Royal Army Medical Corps stationed in Malta who isolated brucella organisms from a patient with meningo-encephalitis. In 1989, neurologists in Saudi Arabia made significant contributions to the medical literature involving neurobrucellosis.

These obsolete names have previously been applied to brucellosis:

- Crimean fever
- Cyprus fever
- Gibraltar fever
- Goat fever
- Italian fever
- Neapolitan fever

=== Biological warfare ===
Brucella species had been weaponized by several advanced countries by the mid-20th century. In 1954, B. suis became the first agent weaponized by the United States at its Pine Bluff Arsenal near Pine Bluff, Arkansas. Brucella species survive well in aerosols and resist drying. Brucella and all other remaining biological weapons in the U.S. arsenal were destroyed in 1971–72 when the American offensive biological warfare program was discontinued by order of President Richard Nixon.

The experimental American bacteriological warfare program focused on three agents of the Brucella group:

- Porcine brucellosis (agent US)
- Bovine brucellosis (agent AA)
- Caprine brucellosis (agent AM)

Agent US was in advanced development by the end of World War II. When the United States Air Force (USAF) wanted a biological warfare capability, the Chemical Corps offered Agent US in the M114 bomblet, based on the four-pound bursting bomblet developed for spreading anthrax during World War II. Though the capability was developed, operational testing indicated the weapon was less than desirable, and the USAF designed it as an interim capability until it could eventually be replaced by a more effective biological weapon.

The main drawback of using the M114 with Agent US was that it acted mainly as an incapacitating agent, whereas the USAF administration wanted deadly weapons. The stability of M114 in storage was too low to allow for storing it at forward air bases, and the logistical requirements to neutralize a target were far higher than originally planned. Ultimately, this would have required too much logistical support to be practical in the field.

Agents US and AA had a median infective dose of 500 organisms/person, and for Agent AM, it was 300 organisms/person. The incubation time was believed to be about 2 weeks, with a duration of infection of several months. The lethality estimate was, based on epidemiological information, 1 to 2 per cent. Agent AM was believed to be a somewhat more virulent disease, with a fatality rate of 3 per cent being expected.

== Other animals ==
Species infecting domestic livestock are B. abortus (cattle, bison, and elk), B. canis (dogs), B. melitensis (goats and sheep), B. ovis (sheep), and B. suis (caribou and pigs). Brucella species have also been isolated from several marine mammal species (cetaceans and pinnipeds).

=== Cattle ===
B. abortus is the principal cause of brucellosis in cattle. The bacteria are shed from an infected animal at or around the time of calving or abortion. Once exposed, the likelihood of an animal becoming infected is variable, depending on age, pregnancy status, and other intrinsic factors of the animal, as well as the number of bacteria to which the animal was exposed. The most common clinical signs of cattle infected with B. abortus are high incidences of abortions, arthritic joints, and retained placenta.

The two main causes for spontaneous abortion in animals are erythritol, which can promote infections in the fetus and placenta,, and the lack of anti-Brucella activity in the amniotic fluid. Males can also harbor the bacteria in their reproductive tracts, namely seminal vesicles, ampullae, testicles, and epididymises.

=== Dogs ===
The causative agent of brucellosis in dogs, B. canis, is transmitted to other dogs through breeding and contact with aborted fetuses. Brucellosis can occur in humans who come in contact with infected aborted tissue or semen. The bacteria in dogs normally infect the genitals and lymphatic system, but can also spread to the eyes, kidneys, and intervertebral discs. Brucellosis in the intervertebral disc is one possible cause of discospondylitis. Symptoms of brucellosis in dogs include abortion in female dogs and scrotal inflammation and orchitis in males. Fever is uncommon. Infection of the eye can cause uveitis, and infection of the intervertebral disc can cause pain or weakness. Blood testing of the dogs prior to breeding can prevent the spread of this disease. It is treated with antibiotics, as with humans, but it is difficult to cure.

=== Aquatic wildlife ===
Brucellosis in cetaceans is caused by the bacterium B. ceti. First discovered in the aborted fetus of a bottlenose dolphin, the structure of B. ceti is similar to Brucella in land animals. B. ceti is commonly detected in two suborders of cetaceans, the Mysticeti and Odontoceti. The Mysticeti include four families of baleen whales, filter-feeders, and the Odontoceti include two families of toothed cetaceans ranging from dolphins to sperm whales. B. ceti is believed to transfer from animal to animal through sexual intercourse, maternal feeding, aborted fetuses, placental issues, from mother to fetus, or through fish reservoirs. Brucellosis is a reproductive disease, so it has an extreme negative impact on the population dynamics of a species. This becomes a greater issue when the already low population numbers of cetaceans are taken into consideration. B. ceti has been identified in four of the 14 cetacean families, but the antibodies have been detected in seven of the families. This indicates that B. ceti is common among cetacean families and populations. Only a small percentage of exposed individuals become ill or die. However, particular species apparently are more likely to become infected by B. ceti. The harbor porpoise, striped dolphin, white-sided dolphin, bottlenose dolphin, and common dolphin have the highest frequency of infection among odontocetes. In the mysticetes families, the northern minke whale is by far the most infected species. Dolphins and porpoises are more likely to be infected than cetaceans such as whales. Concerning sex and age biases, the infections do not seem influenced by an individual's age or sex. Although fatal to cetaceans, B. ceti has a low infection rate for humans.

=== Terrestrial wildlife ===
The disease in its various strains can infect multiple wildlife species, including elk (Cervus canadensis), bison (Bison bison), African buffalo (Syncerus caffer), European wild boar (Sus scrofa), caribou (Rangifer tarandus), moose (Alces alces), and marine mammals (see section on aquatic wildlife above). While some regions use vaccines to prevent the spread of brucellosis between infected and uninfected wildlife populations, no suitable brucellosis vaccine for terrestrial wildlife has been developed. This gap in medicinal knowledge creates more pressure for management practices that reduce spread of the disease.

Wild bison and elk in the greater Yellowstone area are the last remaining reservoir of B. abortus in the US. The recent transmission of brucellosis from elk back to cattle in Idaho and Wyoming illustrates how the area, as the last remaining reservoir in the United States, may adversely affect the livestock industry. Eliminating brucellosis from this area is a challenge, as many viewpoints exist on how to manage diseased wildlife. However, the Wyoming Game and Fish Department has recently begun to protect scavengers (particularly coyotes and red fox) on elk feedgrounds, because they act as sustainable, no-cost, biological control agents by removing infected elk fetuses quickly.

The National Elk Refuge in Jackson, Wyoming, asserts that the intensity of the winter feeding program affects the spread of brucellosis more than the population size of elk and bison. Since concentrating animals around food plots accelerates spread of the disease, management strategies to reduce herd density and increase dispersion could limit its spread.

== See also ==
- Brucella suis
