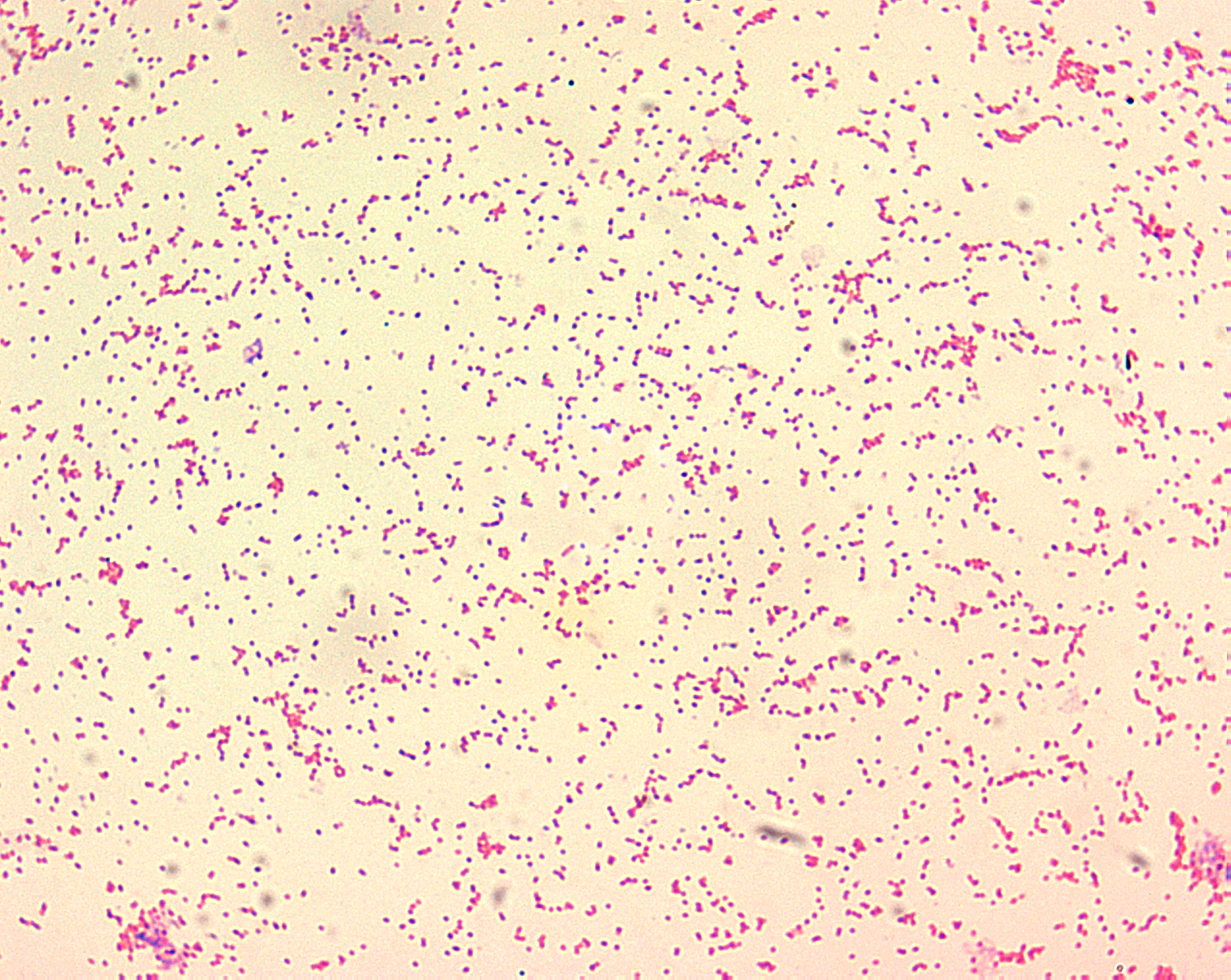
- Brucella sp.

Scientific classification
- Domain: Bacteria
- Kingdom: Pseudomonadati
- Phylum: Pseudomonadota
- Class: Alphaproteobacteria
- Order: Hyphomicrobiales
- Family: Brucellaceae
- Genus: Brucella
- Species: B. ovis

Binomial name
- Brucella ovis Buddle 1956 (Approved Lists 1980)

= Brucella ovis =

Species of bacterium

Brucella ovis is a Gram-negative coccobacillus from the Brucellaceae family. Along with Brucella melitensis, it is responsible for causing ovine brucellosis, which is a notifiable disease. B. ovis can be transmitted by the stable fly. Infection causes severe inflammation of the epididymis, particularly the tail.
