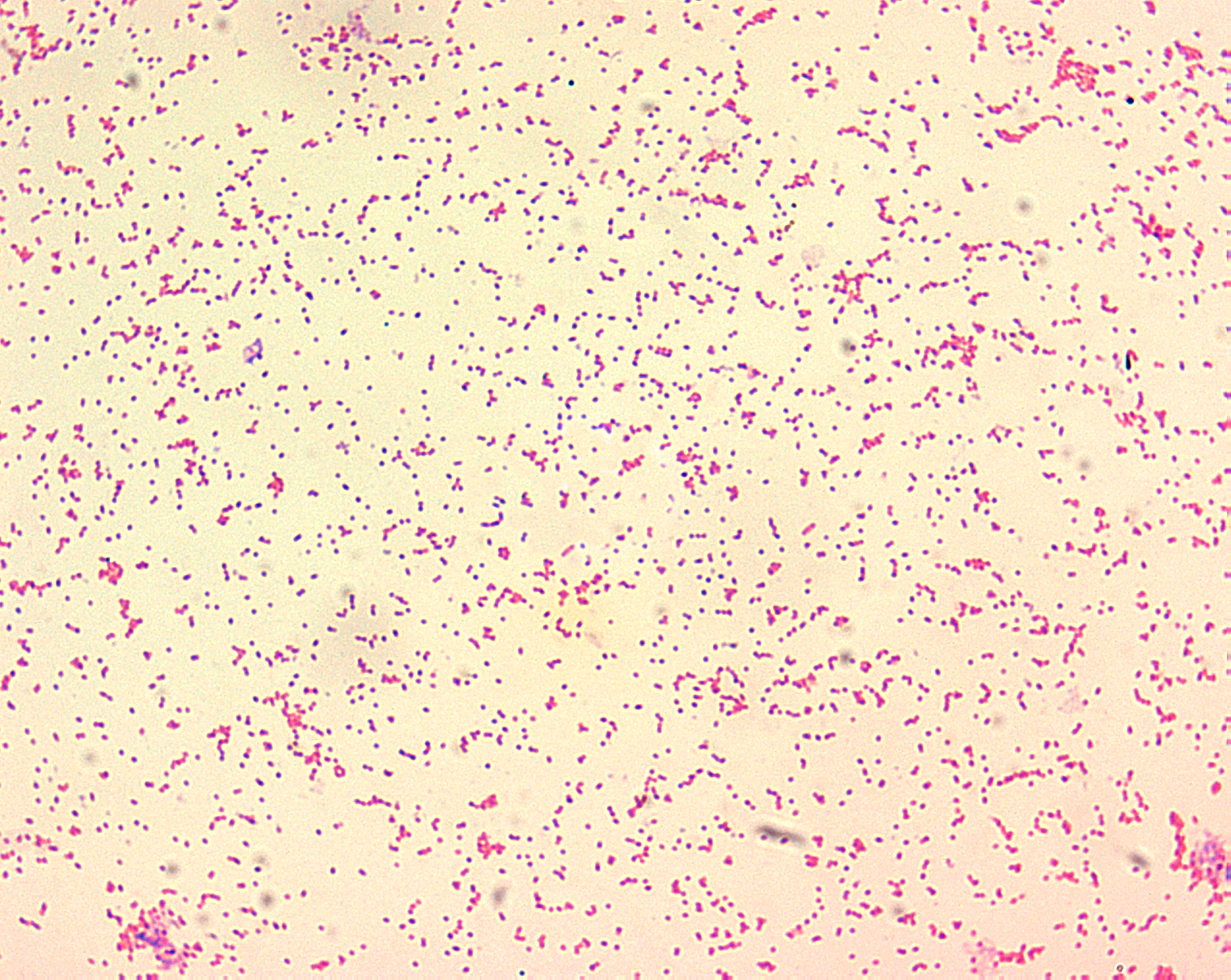
- Brucella spp.

Scientific classification
- Domain: Bacteria
- Kingdom: Pseudomonadati
- Phylum: Pseudomonadota
- Class: Alphaproteobacteria
- Order: Hyphomicrobiales
- Family: Brucellaceae; Breed et al. 1957

Genera
- Brucella Meyer and Shaw 1920 (Approved Lists 1980); Daeguia Yoon et al. 2008; Falsochrobactrum Kämpfer et al. 2013; "Noguchia" Olitsky et al. 1934; Paenochrobactrum Kämpfer et al. 2010; Pseudochrobactrum Kämpfer et al. 2006

= Brucellaceae =

Family of bacteria

The Brucellaceae are a family of the Gram-negative Hyphomicrobiales. They are named after Sir David Bruce, a Scottish microbiologist. They are aerobic chemoorganotrophes. The family comprises pathogen and soil bacteria

== Phylogeny ==
The currently accepted taxonomy is based on the List of Prokaryotic names with Standing in Nomenclature (LPSN). The phylogeny is based on whole-genome analysis.

- - Brucellaceae
    - Pseudochrobactrum
    - - Falsochrobactrum
      - - Daeguia
        - - Paenochrobactrum
          - Brucella
  - outgroup
    Phyllobacterium
