= Uterine microbiome =

Microorganisms in a healthy uterus

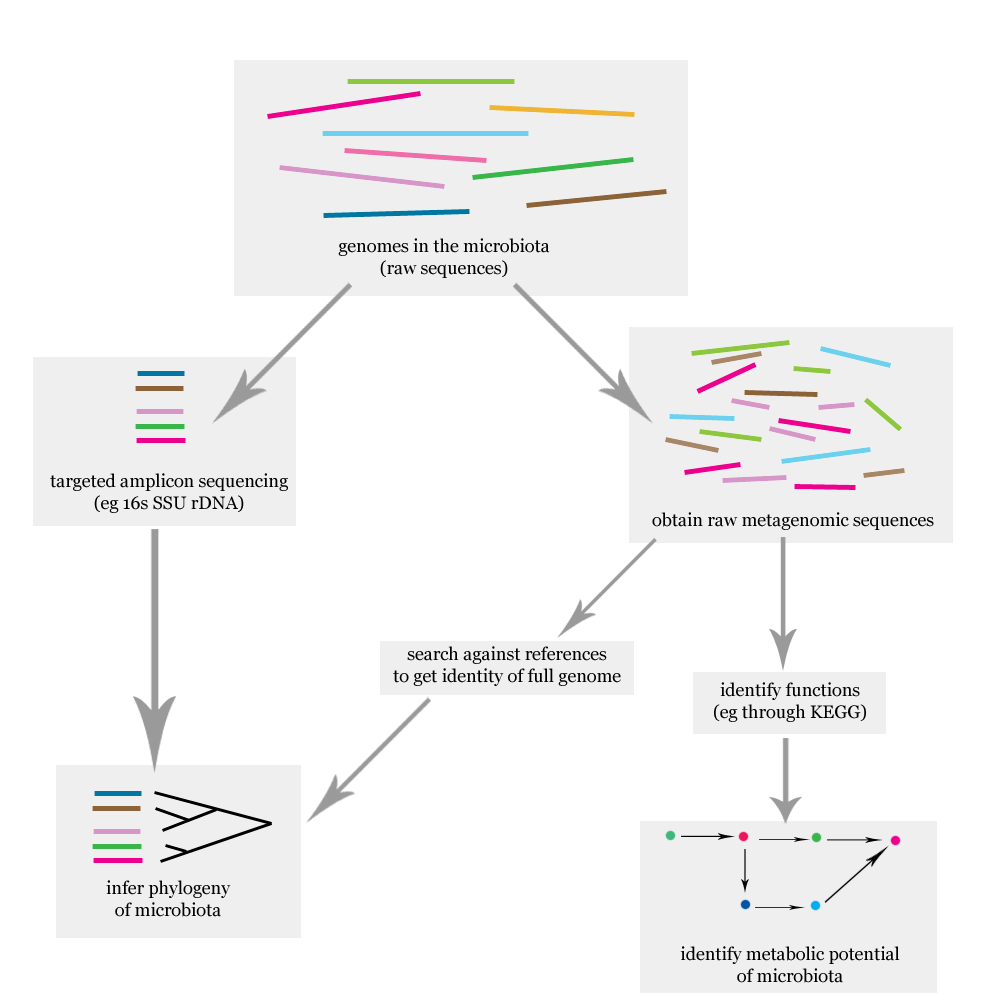
Microbiome analysis flowchart

The uterine microbiome refers to the community of commensal, nonpathogenic microorganisms—including bacteria, viruses, and yeasts/fungi—present in a healthy uterus, as well as in the amniotic fluid and endometrium. These microorganisms coexist in a specific environment within the uterus, playing a vital role in maintaining reproductive health. In the past, the uterus was believed to be a sterile environment, free of any microbial life. Recent advancements in microbiological research, particularly the improvement of 16S rRNA gene sequencing techniques, have challenged this long-held belief. These advanced techniques have made it possible to detect bacteria and other microorganisms present in very low numbers. Using this procedure that allows the detection of bacteria that cannot be cultured outside the body, studies of microbiota present in the uterus are expected to increase.

== Uterine microbiome and fertility ==
In the past, the uterine cavity had been traditionally considered to be sterile, but potentially susceptible to be affected by vaginal bacteria. However, this idea has been disproved. Moreover, it's been shown that endometrial and vaginal microbiota can differ in structure and composition in some women.

The microbiome of the innermost layer of the uterus, the endometrium, may influence its capacity to allow an embryo to implant. The existence of more than 10% of non-Lactobacillus bacteria in the endometrium is correlated with negative impacts on reproductive function and should be considered as an emerging cause of implantation failure and pregnancy loss.

== Characteristics ==
Bacteria, viruses, and one genus of yeasts are a normal part of the uterus before and during pregnancy. The uterus has been found to possess its own characteristic microbiome that differs significantly from the vaginal microbiome, consisting primarily of lactobacillus species, and at far fewer numbers. In addition, the immune system is able to differentiate between those bacteria normally found in the uterus and those that are pathogenic. Hormonal changes have an effect on the microbiota of the uterus.

== Taxa ==
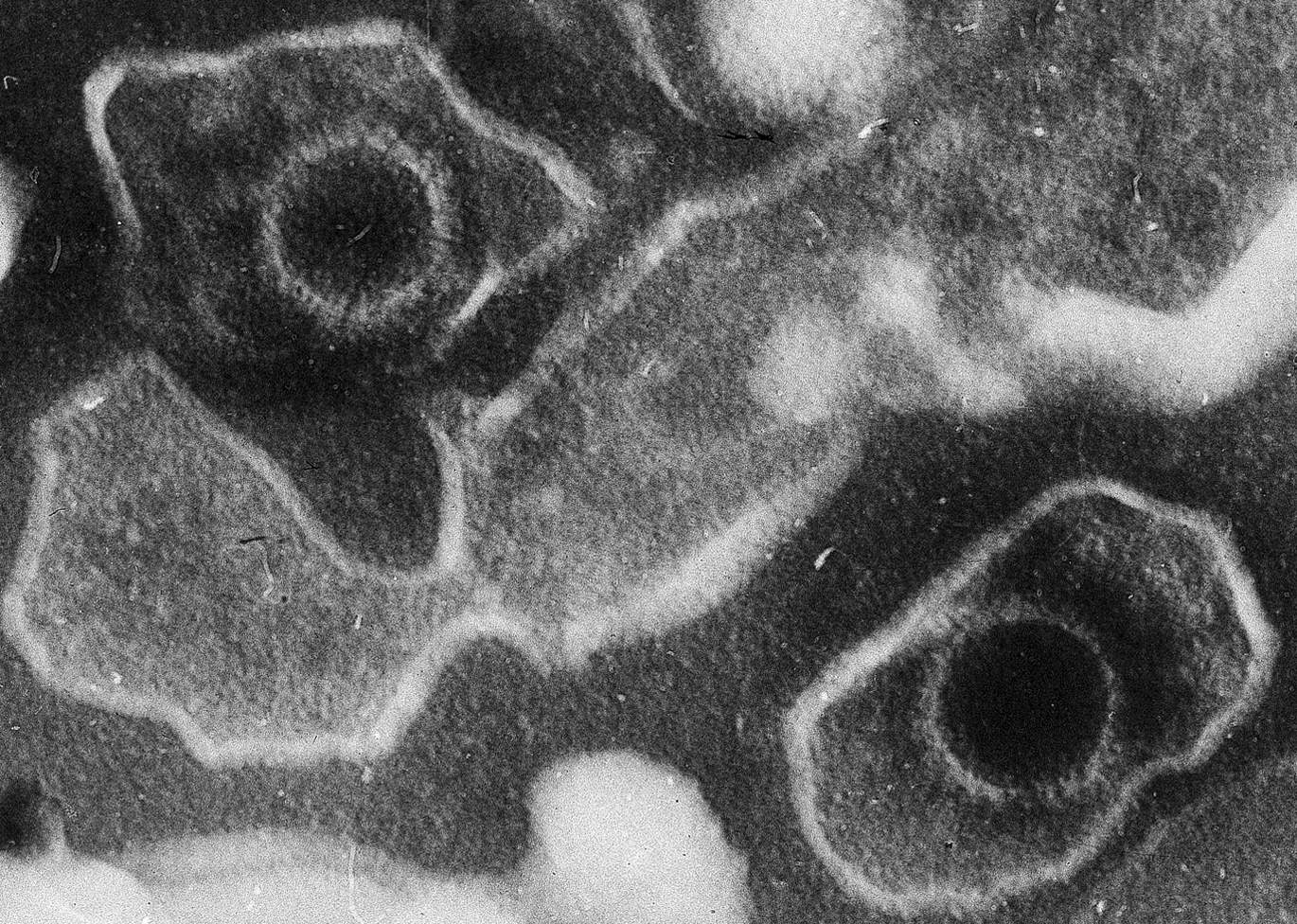
Epstein–Barr virus

=== Commensals ===
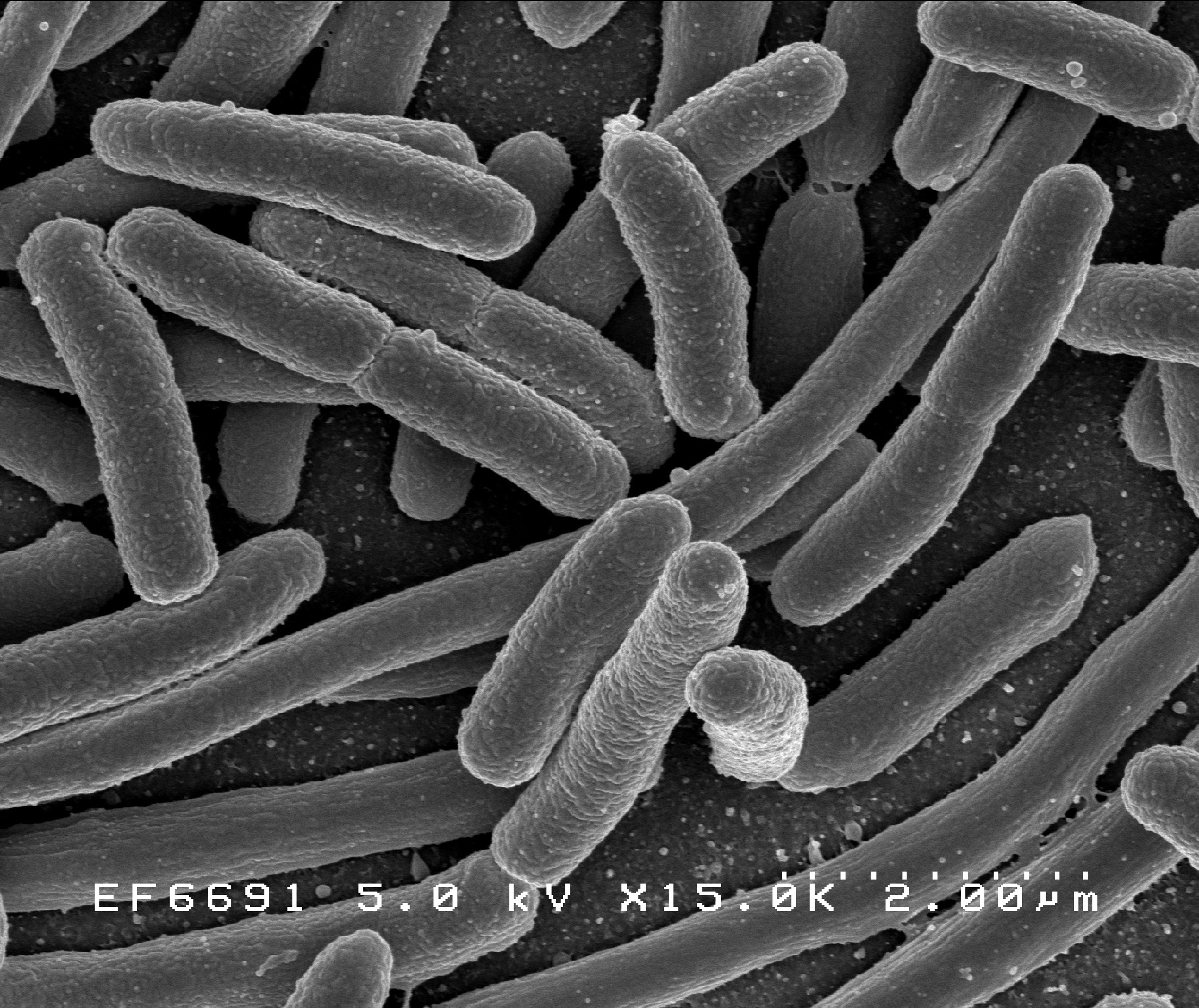
Escherichia coli

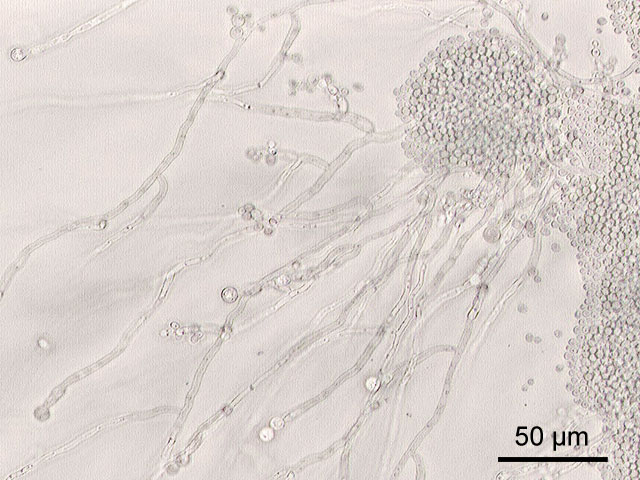
Candida sp.

The organisms listed below have been identified as commensals in the healthy uterus. Some also have the potential for growing to the point of causing disease:

Organism	Commensal	Transient	Potential pathogen	References
Escherichia coli	x		x	
Escherichia spp.		x	x	
Ureaplasma parvum	x		x	
Fusobacterium nucleatum	x			
Prevotella tannerae	x			
Bacteroides spp.	x			
Streptomyces avermitilis	x			
Mycoplasma spp.	x		x	
Neisseria lactamica	x			
Neisseria polysaccharea	x			
Epstein–Barr virus	x		x	
Respiratory syncytial virus	x		x	
Adenovirus	x		x	
Candida spp.	x		x	

=== Pathogens ===
Other taxa can be present, without causing disease or an immune response. Their presence is associated with negative birth outcomes.

Pathogenic organism	Increased risk of	References
Ureaplasma urealyticum	Premature, preterm rupture of membranes Preterm labor cesarean section Placental inflammation Congenital pneumonia bacteremia meningitis fetal lung injury death of infant	
Ureaplasma parvum		
Haemophilus influenzae	Premature, preterm rupture of membranes preterm labor preterm birth	
Fusobacterium nucleatum		
Prevotella tannerae		
Bacteroides spp.		
Streptomyces avermitilis		
Mycoplasma hominis	Congenital pneumonia bacteremia meningitis pelvic inflammatory disease postpartum or postabortal fever	
Neisseria lactamica		
Neisseria polysaccharea
Epstein–Barr virus		
Respiratory syncytial virus		
Adenovirus		
Candida spp.		
Atopobium spp.	Unsuccessful reproductive outcomes in infertile patients (no pregnancy or clinical miscarriage)	
Bifidobacterium spp.	Unsuccessful reproductive outcomes in infertile patients (no pregnancy or clinical miscarriage)	
Chryseobacterium spp.	Unsuccessful reproductive outcomes in infertile patients (no pregnancy or clinical miscarriage)	
Gardnerella spp.	Unsuccessful reproductive outcomes in infertile patients (no pregnancy or clinical miscarriage)	
Klebsiella spp.	Unsuccessful reproductive outcomes in infertile patients (no pregnancy or clinical miscarriage)	
Staphylococcus spp.	Unsuccessful reproductive outcomes in infertile patients (no pregnancy or clinical miscarriage)	
Haemophilus spp.	Unsuccessful reproductive outcomes in infertile patients (no pregnancy or clinical miscarriage)	
Streptomyces spp.	Unsuccessful reproductive outcomes in infertile patients (no pregnancy or clinical miscarriage)	
Neisseria spp.	Unsuccessful reproductive outcomes in infertile patients (no pregnancy or clinical miscarriage)	

== Clinical significance ==
Prophylactic antibiotics have been injected into the uterus to treat infertility. This has been done before the transfer of embryos with the intent to improve implantation rates. No association exists between successful implantation and antibiotic treatment. Infertility treatments often progress to the point where a microbiological analysis of the uterine microbiota is performed. Preterm birth is associated with certain species of bacteria that are not normally part of the healthy uterine microbiome.

The uterine microbiome appears to be altered in female patients who experience endometrial cancer, endometriosis, chronic endometriosis, and related gynecological pathologies, suggesting the clinical relevance of the uterine microbiome’s composition. Next-generation sequencing has revealed the presence of certain bacterial taxa, such as Alteromonas, to be present in patients presenting with gynecological conditions.

Clinically speaking, there is no universal protocol on how to treat uterine dysbiosis. However, use of antibiotics has been widespread. In the context of infertility, researchers have studied the effects of a treatment plan of antibiotics in conjunction with prebiotics and probiotics to increase Lactobacillus colonization in the endometrium. It was found that, while there was a Lactobacillus-dominated endometrium correlated with increased pregnancy rates, the data was not statistically significant. Antibiotics have also been used to treat chronic endometritis and endometriosis.

Interestingly, a link between the oral microbiome and the uterine microbiome has been uncovered. Fusobacterium nucleatum, a Gram-negative bacteria commensal to the oral microbiome, is associated with periodontal disease and has been linked with a wide variety of health outcomes, including unfavorable pregnancy outcomes.

== Immune response ==
The immune response becomes more pronounced when bacteria are found that are not commensal.

== History ==
Investigations into reproductive-associated microbiomes began around 1885 by Theodor Escherich. He wrote that meconium from the newborn was free of bacteria. There was a general consensus at the time and even recently that the uterus was sterile and this was referred to as the sterile womb paradigm. Other investigations used sterile diapers for meconium collection. No bacteria were able to be cultured from the samples. Other studies showed that bacteria were detected and were directly proportional to the time between birth and the passage of meconium.

== Research ==
Investigations into the role of the uterine microbiome in the development of the infant microbiome are ongoing. In recent years, the number of articles and review publications discussing the uterine microbiome has grown. Based on a Web of Science analysis, the highest number of documents published on the topic was in 2023, with a total of 23 papers.

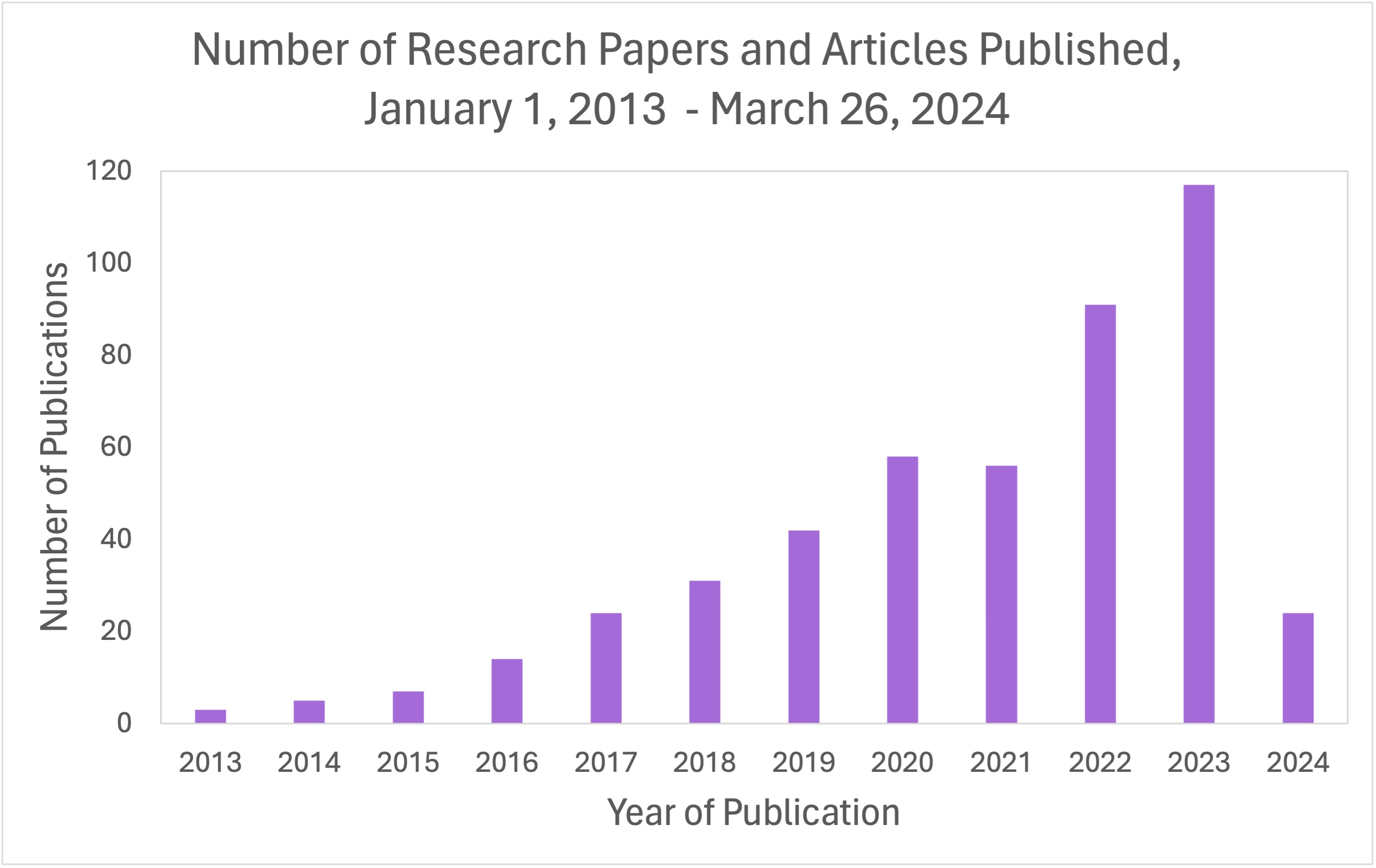
Bar chart demonstrating increased publications focusing on the uterine microbiome. A search keyword of “uterine microbiome” was used on Web of Science, and this bar chart only included articles and review papers. The date range of this search is from January 1, 2013 to March 26, 2024.

The Daunert Lab, based at the University of Miami’s Sylvester Comprehensive Cancer Center, focuses on the role of the microbiome in endometrial cancer and the role the uterine microbiome plays in the success of an IVF cycle. Similarly, Dr. Maria Walther-Antonio’s lab at the Mayo Clinic focuses on the microbiome’s role in endometrial cancer. Notably, Dr. Walther- Antonio has confirmed that Porphyromas somerae is able to invade endometrial cells, indicating a possibility that this microbe contributes to the pathogenesis of endometrial cancer.

The Carlos Simon Foundation, based in Valencia, Spain, is an women’s health research organization founded by reproductive endocrinologist Carlos Simon, MD PhD. A research team led by Dr. Inmaculada Moreno at the Carlos Simon Foundation studies the role of the endometrial microbiome in human reproduction. When research on the uterine microbiome was scarce, Dr. Moreno and her team analyzed the endometrial microbiota and discovered that there was a correlation between certain endometrial microbiota compositions and the outcome of implantation success or failure. Six years later, they followed up with a paper revealing that specific pathogenic bacteria and depletion of Lactobacillus spp. in the endometrium correlated with impaired fertility.

== See also ==
- Human microbiome
- Human Microbiome Project
- Human virome
- List of antimicrobial peptides in the female reproductive tract
- List of bacterial vaginosis microbiota
- Placental microbiome
- Vaginal epithelium
- Vaginal flora in pregnancy
