= Salivary microbiome =

Biological contents of human saliva

The salivary microbiome consists of the nonpathogenic, commensal bacteria present in the healthy human salivary glands. It differs from the oral microbiome which is located in the oral cavity. Oral microorganisms tend to adhere to teeth. The oral microbiome possesses its own characteristic microorganisms found there. Resident microbes of the mouth adhere to the teeth and gums. "[T]here may be important interactions between the saliva microbiome and other microbiomes in the human body, in particular, that of the intestinal tract."

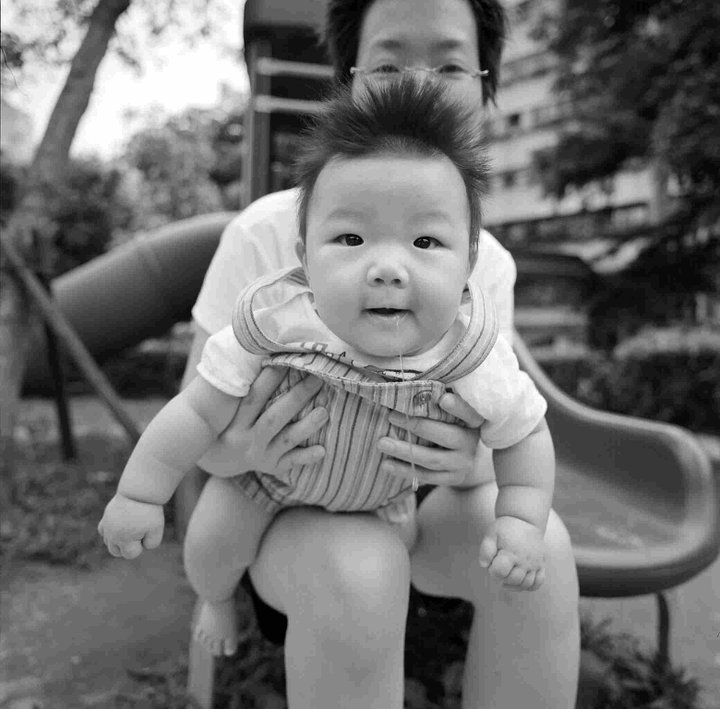
Microorganisms reside in saliva

== Characteristics ==
Unlike the uterine, placental and vaginal microbiomes, the types of organisms in the salivary microbiota remain relatively constant. There is no difference between populations of microbes based upon sex, age, diet, obesity, alcohol intake, race, or tobacco use. The salivary microbiome characteristically remains stable over a lifetime. One study suggests sharing an environment (e.g., living together) may influence the salivary microbiome more than genetic components. Porphyromonas, Solobacterium, Haemophilus, Corynebacterium, Cellulosimicrobium, Streptococcus and Campylobacter are some of the genera found in the saliva.

While the salivary microbiome shows stability, the broader oral microbiome can be influenced by various factors. A number of elements, including diet, dental hygiene, age, underlying medical conditions, and the use of antibiotics, as well as lifestyle choices such as smoking and alcohol consumption, and physiological changes such as pregnancy, the menstrual cycle, and menopause, can exert an influence on the composition of the oral microbiome.

== Genetic markers and diagnostic testing ==
"There is high diversity in the salivary microbiome within and between individuals, but little geographic structure. Overall, ~13.5% of the total variance in the composition of genera is due to differences among individuals, which is remarkably similar to the fraction of the total variance in neutral genetic markers that can be attributed to differences among human populations."

"[E]nvironmental variables revealed a significant association between the genetic distances among locations and the distance of each location from the equator. Further characterization of the enormous diversity revealed here in the human salivary microbiome will aid in elucidating the role it plays in human health and disease, and in the identification of potentially informative species for studies of human population history."

Sixty new genera have been identified from the salivary glands. A total of 101 different genera were identified in the salivary glands. Out of these, 39 genera are not found in the oral microbiome. It is not known whether the resident species remain constant or change.

Though the association between the salivary microbiome is similar to that of the oral microbiome, there also exists an association the salivary microbiome and the gut microbiome. Saliva sampling may be a non-invasive way to detect changes in the gut microbiome and changes in systemic disease. The association between the salivary microbiome those with polyendocrine metabolic ovarian syndrome (PMOS) has been characterized: "saliva microbiome profiles correlate with those in the stool, despite the fact that the bacterial communities in the two locations differ greatly. Therefore, saliva may be a useful alternative to stool as an indicator of bacterial dysbiosis in systemic disease."

The sugar concentration in salivary secretions can vary. Blood sugar levels are reflected in salivary gland secretions. High salivary glucose (HSG) levels are a glucose concentration ≥ 1.0 mg/d, n = 175) and those with low salivary glucose (LSG) levels are < 0.1 mg/dL n = 2,537). Salivary gland secretions containing high levels of sugar change the oral microbiome and contributes to an environment that is conductive to the formation of dental caries and gingivitis.

== Salivary glands ==
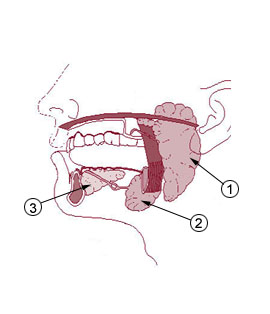
Salivary glands: 1.parotid, 2.submandibular, 3.sublingual.

Organisms of the salivary microbiome reside in the three major salivary glands: parotid, submandibular, and sublingual. These glands secrete electrolytes, proteins, genetic material, polysaccharides, and other molecules. Most of these substances enter the salivary gland acinus and duct system from surrounding capillaries via the intervening tissue fluid, although some substances are produced within the glands themselves. The level of each salivary component varies considerably depending on the health status of the individual and the presence of pathogenic and commensal organisms.

== See also ==
- Human microbiome
- Human microbiome project
- Human virome
- List of bacterial vaginosis microbiota
- Microbiota of the lower reproductive tract of women
- Vaginal microbiota in pregnancy
