= Janet Jansson =

American scientist

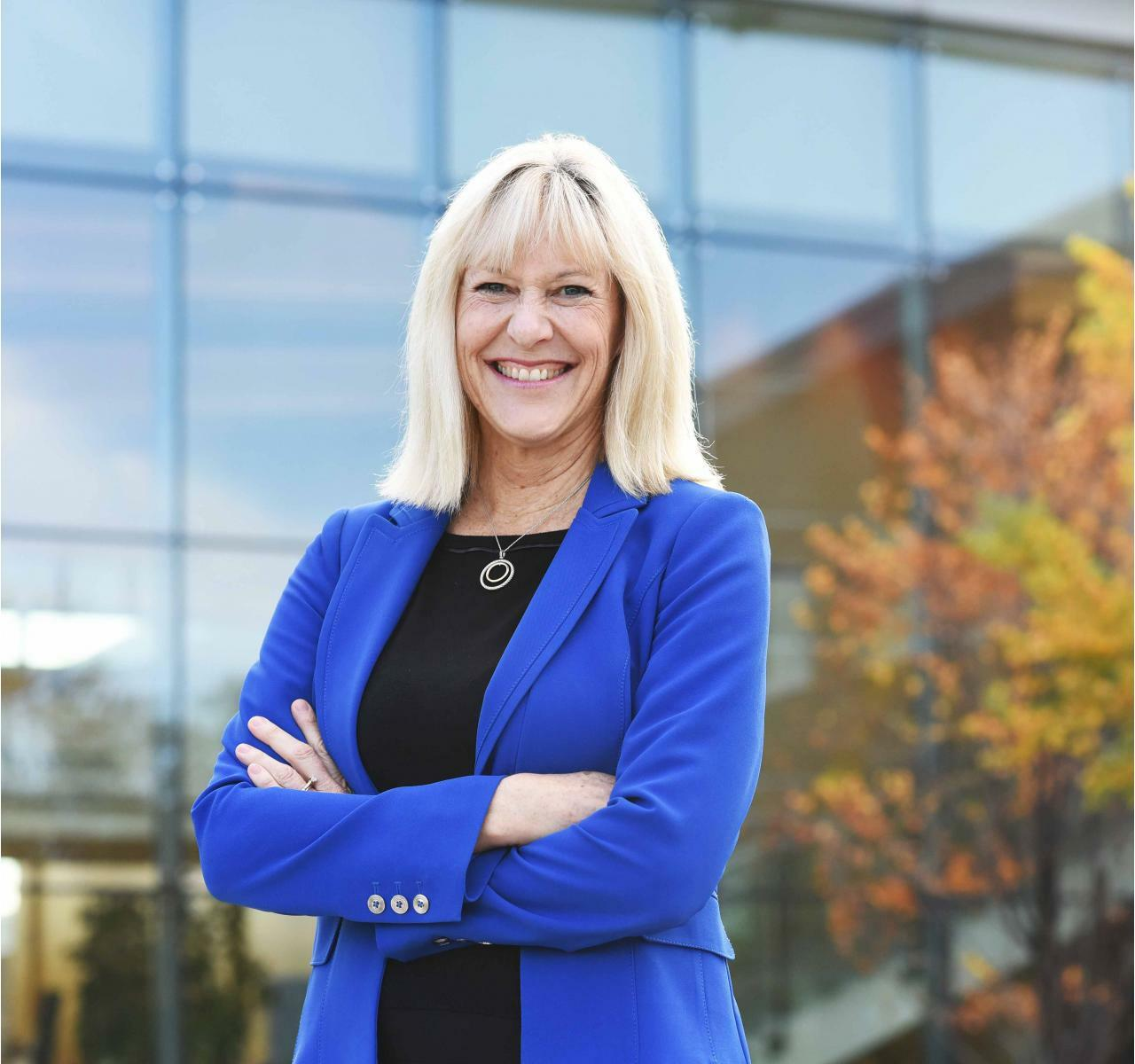
- Born: Janet Knutson Jansson
- Education: Michigan State University; New Mexico State University; Colorado State University
- Scientific career
- Fields: Human microbiome Environmental microbiology
- Workplaces: Swedish University of Agricultural Sciences; University of California, Berkeley; University of Copenhagen; Pacific Northwest National Laboratory
- Thesis: Development of gene probe methodology for detection of specific bacteria in environmental samples (1988)
- Website: www.pnnl.gov/people/janet-jansson

Janet Knutson Jansson is an American biological scientist who is the Chief Scientist at the Pacific Northwest National Laboratory. She investigates complex microbial communities, including those found in soil and the human gut. Jansson is part of the Phenotypic Response of the Soil Microbiome to Environmental Perturbations Science Focus Area, and is a Fellow of the American Society for Microbiology.

== Early life and education ==
Jansson started her scientific career at New Mexico State University, where she majored in chemical engineering but selected electives in biology and soil science. She has said that her soil microbiology professor, William Lindemann, introduced her to microbiology. She moved to Colorado State University for her master's degree, where she started working on soil microbiology. She continued to explore oil biology in her doctoral research at Michigan State University, during which she developed gene probe methods for detecting bacteria in environmental samples. This was a new concept, because previously microorganisms could only be examined by microscopy. In 1988, she moved to Sweden.

== Research and career ==
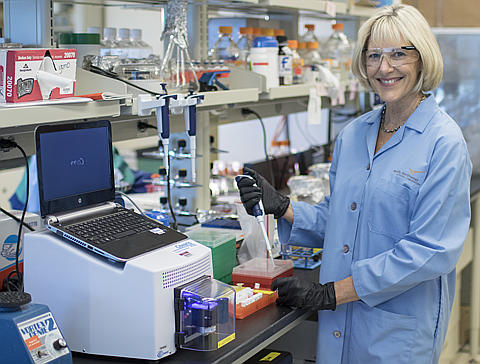
Jansson at work in the research laboratory

Jansson was on the faculty at the Swedish University of Agricultural Sciences where she worked as a researcher, lecturer, professor and Chair of Environmental Biology. She left Sweden in 2007, and moved to Lawrence Berkeley National Laboratory as a senior staff scientist. She held a joint position at University of California, Berkeley and the University of Copenhagen.

In 2014, Jansson joined the Pacific Northwest National Laboratory, where she was made Chief Scientist for Biology. Her research considers multi-omics based strategies to investigate microbial organisms. She has studied how climate change impacts microbial communities in ecosystems: how warming impacts permafrost soil microbiomes and how drought impacts grassland soils. She is also interested in the human microbiome: how diet and disease impact the gut microbiome. She was the first to use molecular techniques such as genome sequencing to understand the human gut, gaining insight about the types of microbes that were involved in health and disease.

At the Pacific Northwest National Laboratory, Jansson leads the focus area on Phenotypic Response of the Soil Microbiome to Environmental Perturbations. The program looks to develop a comprehensive understanding of soil microbial responses to changing moisture. She served as President of the International Society for Microbiology. She was appointed to the National Academy of Sciences committee on Soil Sciences in 2020.

She is currently on the Scientific Advisory Board of Seed.

=== Selected publications ===
- M. Ross; M. Nathalia Garcia; Vivien Bonazzi; et al. (14 June 2012). "Structure, function and diversity of the healthy human microbiome". Nature. 486 (7402): 207–14. Bibcode:2012Natur.486..207T. doi:10.1038/nature11234. ISSN 1476-4687. PMC 3564958. PMID 22699609. Wikidata Q24626370.
- Catherine A Lozupone; Jesse I Stombaugh; Jeffrey I Gordon; Janet K Jansson; Rob Knight (13 September 2012). "Diversity, stability and resilience of the human gut microbiota". Nature. 489 (7415): 220–30. doi:10.1038/nature11550. ISSN 1476-4687. PMC 3577372. PMID 22972295. Wikidata Q28274959.
- Matthew Ross; Fah Sathirapongsasuti; M. Nathalia Garcia; et al. (14 June 2012). "A framework for human microbiome research". Nature. 486 (7402): 215–21. doi:10.1038/nature11209. ISSN 1476-4687. PMC 3377744. PMID 22699610. Wikidata Q24602401.
- Tracking genetically-engineered microorganisms. Janet K. Jansson, J. D. van Elsas, Mark J. Bailey. Georgetown, Tex.: Landes Bioscience. 2000. ISBN 0-585-44576-1. OCLC 52171139.
