= Placental microbiome =

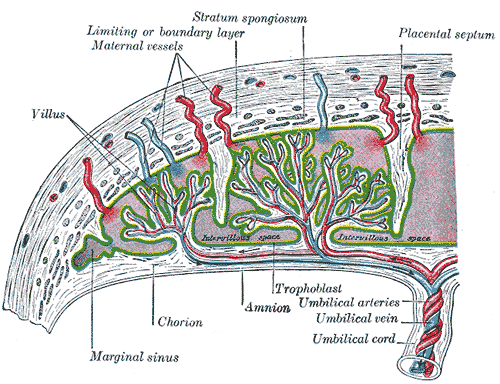
Placenta and its tissue layers

The placental microbiome is the nonpathogenic, commensal bacteria claimed to be present in a healthy human placenta and is distinct from bacteria that cause infection and preterm birth in chorioamnionitis. Until recently, the healthy placenta was considered to be a sterile organ but now genera and species have been identified that reside in the basal layer.

It should be stressed that the evidence for a placental microbiome is controversial. Most studies supporting the existence of a placental microbiome lack the appropriate experimental controls, and it has been found that contamination is most likely responsible for reports of a placental microbiome.

The placental microbiome more closely resembles that of the oral microbiome than either the vaginal or rectal microbiome.

== Bacterial species and genera ==
Culturable and non-culturable bacterial species in the placenta obtained following normal term pregnancy have been identified.

Binomial name	Commensal	Transient	Potential pathogen	References
Prevotella tannerae	x		x	
Bacillota spp.		x	x	
Mycoplasmatota spp.	x		x	
Fusobacterium nucleatum	x		x	
Prevotella tanerae	x			
Bacteroides spp.	x		x	
Fusobacterium spp.	x		x	
Streptomyces avermitilis	x			
Neisseria polysaccharea	x			
Neisseria lactamica	x			
Pseudomonadota spp.	x			
Bacteroidota spp.	x			
Escherichia coli	x		x	
Escherichia spp.	x		x	
Actinomycetota spp.	x		x	
"Cyanobacteria" spp.	x			
Chloroflexota spp.	x			
Aquificota spp.	x			
Verrucomicrobiota spp.	x			
Vibrio spp.	x			
Burkholderia spp.	x			
Beijerinckia spp.	x			

In a healthy placental microbiome, the diversity of the species and genera is extensive. A change in the composition of the microbiota in the placenta is associated with excess gestational weight gain, and pre-term birth. The placental microbiota varies between low birth weight infants and those infants with normal birth weights. While bacteria are often found in the amniotic fluid of failed pregnancies, they are also found in particulate matter that is found in about 1% of healthy pregnancies.

In non-human animals, part of the microbiome is passed onto offspring even before the offspring are born. Bacteriologists assume that the same probably holds true for humans.

== Research ==
The fact that germ free animals can be routinely generated by sterile cesarean section provides strong experimental evidence for the sterile womb hypothesis.

Future research may find that the microbiota of the female reproductive tract may be related to pregnancy, conception, and birth. Animal studies have been used to investigate the relationship between oral microbiota and the placental microbiota. Mice inoculated with species of oral bacteria demonstrated placental colonization soon afterwards.

== History ==
Investigations into reproductive-associated microbiomes began around 1885 by Theodor Escherich. He wrote that meconium from the newborn was free of bacteria. This was interpreted as the uterine environment being sterile. Other investigations used sterile diapers for meconium collection. No bacteria were able to be cultured from the samples. Bacteria were detected and were directly proportional to the time between birth and the passage of meconium. A 1927 study demonstrated the presence of bacteria in the amniotic fluid of those that were in labor for longer than six hours.

== See also ==
- Human microbiome
- Human microbiome project
- Human virome
- List of bacterial vaginosis microbiota
- Microbiota of the lower reproductive tract of women
- Vaginal microbiota in pregnancy
