= Carlos Simon =

Carlos Simon may refer to:

- Carlos Eugênio Simon (born 1965), Brazilian football referee
- Carlos Simon (composer) (born 1986), American composer
- Carlos Simon (gynaecologist) (born 1961), Spanish gynaecologist and obstetrician
- Carlos Simón, landscape designer of Palmetum of Santa Cruz de Tenerife

== See also ==
- Carlos Simons (born 1954), Turks and Caicos Islands lawyer and politician
