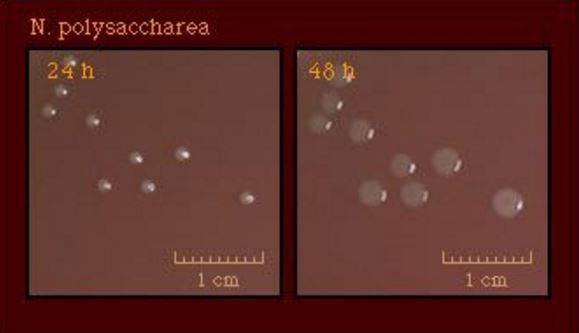
- An image of the culture of Neisseria polysaccharea at 24 and then 48 hours from the Centers for Disease Control

Scientific classification
- Domain: Bacteria
- Kingdom: Pseudomonadati
- Phylum: Pseudomonadota
- Class: Betaproteobacteria
- Order: Neisseriales
- Family: Neisseriaceae
- Genus: Neisseria
- Species: N. polysaccharea

Binomial name
- Neisseria polysaccharea Riou and Guibourdenche 1987

= Neisseria polysaccharea =

Species of bacterium

Neisseria polysaccharea was described in 1983 and is characterized by its ability to produce acid from glucose and maltose and polysaccharide from sucrose. It is nonpathogenic. Strains of this species were previously identified as nontypable strains of N. meningitidis. Strains of N. polysaccharea also may have been misidentified previously as N. subflava because their ability to produce polysaccharide from sucrose was not determined. Other Neisseria species have been be misidentified as N. polysaccharea by acid production tests and supplemental tests.

Neisseria polysacchareais a Gram-negative diplococcus, catalase positive, culturable bacteria. It has been identified as being part of the uterine microbiome and placental microbiome.
