= Catherine A. Lozupone =

American microbiologist

- Born: Catherine Anne Lozupone; 1975 (age 50–51)

Academic background
- Education: Villanova University; Colorado State University; University of Colorado Boulder
- Doctoral advisor: Rob Knight

Academic work
- Institutions: University of Colorado Denver
- Main interests: microbiologist
- Notable works: Diversity, Stability and Resilience of the Human Gut Microbiota

Catherine Anne Lozupone (born 1975) is an American microbiologist who specializes in bacteria and how they impact human health. She is noted work in trying to determine what constitutes "normal" gut bacteria, which led to her creating the UniFrac algorithm, which is used by researchers to plot the relationships between microbial communities in the human body. Lozupone is currently an associate professor of biomedical informatics at Anschutz Medical Campus School of Medicine.

== Education ==
Catherine A. Lozupone earned a Bachelor of Science from Villanova University in 1997 and went on to obtain a master's degree from Colorado State University in Fort Collins, Colorado in 1999. She completed her doctoral work at the University of Colorado Boulder studying under Rob Knight.

== Career ==
At the time of her doctoral research, little was known about the microbiome (genes of the bacteria, archaea, microscopic eukaryotes, and viruses interacting in an environment) of the gut and the symbiotic relationship between host and bacteria. Her thesis delineated the UniFrac algorithm which has allowed researchers to visualize the relationships between microbial communities in the human gut, how they interact, and how they might be related to specific diseases. Lozupone's work, detailed in a 2012 paper which appeared in Nature entitled "Diversity, Stability and Resilience of the Human Gut Microbiota", was noted for its attempt to analyze what is the "normal" bacterial state in the human gut. By approaching the gut as an ecosystem, scientists are then able to factor in the effects of lifestyle, diet, health status which might change the bacterial makeup present in the gastrointestinal tract.

In 2013, after completing her post-doctoral research in Knight's lab, Lozupone started her own lab at the University of Colorado Denver, where she works in the Department of Biomedical Informatics as an associate professor. She has begun evaluating the composition differences in the microbiome of healthy individuals versus those of HIV positive individuals. She is attempting to determine if T cell loss causes change in the bacteria levels, thus prompting chronic inflammation for people living with HIV.

According to Thomson Reuters, Lozupone was one of the most cited researchers in the world in 2014. One article that may have influenced that claim is her 2012 article, "Diversity, stability and resilience of the human gut microbiota," published in Nature. Data published by Nature show that this article ranked in the 99th percentile of nearly 200,000 articles published around the same time.

Her most recent work, released in 2024, provided evidence that an agrarian diet improves metabolic health of HIV positive males. This research connected the alteration of diet that impacted the microbiome, proving that the microbiome has an influence on health.

== Selected work ==
- Lozupone, Catherine A. (2007). "Global Patterns of Bacterial Diversity". Proceedings of the National Academy of Sciences of the United States of America. 104 (27): 11436–40. Bibcode:2007PNAS..10411436L. doi:10.1073/pnas.0611525104. PMC 2040916. PMID 17592124.
- Hamady, Micah; Lozupone, Catherine A.; Knight, Rob (2010). "Fast UniFrac: facilitating high-throughput phylogenetic analyses of microbial communities including analysis of pyrosequencing and PhyloChip data". The ISME Journal. 4 (1): 17–27. Bibcode:2010ISMEJ...4...17H. doi:10.1038/ismej.2009.97. PMC 2797552. PMID 19710709.
- Lozupone, Catherine A.; Stombaugh, Jesse I.; Gordon, Jeffrey I.; Jansson, Janet K.; Knight, Rob (13 September 2012). "Diversity, stability and resilience of the human gut microbiota". Nature. 489 (7415): 220–230. Bibcode:2012Natur.489..220L. doi:10.1038/nature11550. PMC 3577372. PMID 22972295.

== Bibliography ==
- Knight, Rob (2015). Follow Your Gut: The Enormous Impact of Tiny Microbes. Simon & Schuster/TED. ISBN 978-1-4767-8475-5.
- Lozupone, Catherine A. (2007). "Global Patterns of Bacterial Diversity". Proceedings of the National Academy of Sciences of the United States of America. 104 (27): 11436–11440. Bibcode:2007PNAS..10411436L. doi:10.1073/pnas.0611525104. PMC 2040916. PMID 17592124.
