= UniFrac =

Distance metric used for comparing biological communities

UniFrac, a shortened version of unique fraction metric, is a distance metric used for comparing biological communities. It differs from dissimilarity measures such as Bray-Curtis dissimilarity in that it incorporates information on the relative relatedness of community members by incorporating phylogenetic distances between observed organisms in the computation.

Both weighted (quantitative) and unweighted (qualitative) variants of UniFrac are widely used in microbial ecology, where the former accounts for abundance of observed organisms, while the latter only considers their presence or absence. The method was devised by Catherine Lozupone, when she was working with Rob Knight of the University of Colorado at Boulder in 2005.

== Definition ==
Three examples of the triangle inequality for triangles with sides of lengths x, y, z. The top example shows a case where z is much less than the sum x + y of the other two sides, and the bottom example shows a case where the side z is only slightly less than x + y.

The distance is calculated between pairs of samples (each sample represents an organismal community). All taxa found in one or both samples are placed on a phylogenetic tree. A branch leading to taxa from both samples is marked as "shared" and branches leading to taxa which appears only in one sample are marked as "unshared". The distance between the two samples is then calculated as:

Fraction of total unshared branch lengths = (sum of unshared branch lengths)/(sum of all tree branch lengths)
$d^U = \sum_{i=1}^n \frac{b_i \left| I(p_i^A>0)-I(p_i^B>0) \right|}{\sum_{i=1}^n b_i}$, where
- $I(.)$ is the indicator function
- $b_i$ is the length of branch i
- $p_i^A$ refers to the taxa proportion descending from the branch i for community A, hence $I(p_i^A > 0)$ refers to the A-unique branches, and vice versa for B.

This definition satisfies the requirements of a distance metric, being non-negative, zero only when entities are identical, transitive, and conforming to the triangle inequality.

== Use ==
If there are several different samples, a distance matrix can be created by making a tree for each pair of samples and calculating their UniFrac measure. Subsequently, standard multivariate statistical methods such as data clustering and principal co-ordinates analysis can be used.

One can determine the statistical significance of the UniFrac distance between two samples using Monte Carlo simulations. By randomizing the sample classification of each taxon on the tree (leaving the branch structure unchanged) and creating a distribution of UniFrac distance values, one can obtain a distribution of UniFrac values. From this, a p-value can be given to the actual distance between the samples.

Permutational analysis of variance (PERMANOVA) is also usable.

== Variants ==
Additionally, there is a weighted version of the UniFrac metric which accounts for the relative abundance of each of the taxa within the communities. This is commonly used in metagenomic studies, where the number of metagenomic reads can be in the tens of thousands, and it is appropriate to 'bin' these reads into operational taxonomic units, or OTUs, which can then be dealt with as taxa within the UniFrac framework.

$$d^W = \frac{\sum_{i=1}^n b_i \left|p_i^A-p_i^B \right|}{\sum_{i=1}^n (p_i^A+p_i^B)}$$

In 2011, a variance-adjusted form was proposed:

$$d^{\mathit{VAW}} = \frac{\sum_{i=1}^n b_i \frac{\left|p_i^A-p_i^B \right|}{m(m-m_i)}}{\sum_{i=1}^n \frac{(p_i^A+p_i^B)}{m(m-m_i)}}$$

where m_{i} is the total number of individuals/reads from both communities on the ith branch and m is total number of individuals/reads.

In 2012, a generalized UniFrac version, which unifies the weighted and unweighted UniFrac distance in a single framework, was proposed. The authors argued that the weighted and unweighted UniFrac distances place too much emphasis on either abundant lineages or rare lineages, respectively, leading to “loss of power when the important composition change occurs in moderately abundant lineages”. The generalized UniFrac distance aims to address this limitation by down-weighting the emphasis on abundant or rare lineages.

$$d^{(\alpha)} = \frac{\sum_{i=1}^n b_i (p_i^A+p_i^B)^\alpha \left|p_i^A-p_i^B \right|}{\sum_{i=1}^n (p_i^A+p_i^B)^\alpha}$$

where 0 ≤ α ≤ 1 controls the contribution from high-abundance branches. α = 1 gives the weighted function while α = 0 does not give the unweighted version (which is one step of dichotomizing further). α = 0.5 was the main version evaluated.
