= Ureaplasma diversum =

Scientific classification
- Domain: Bacteria
- Kingdom: Bacillati
- Phylum: Mycoplasmatota
- Class: Mollicutes
- Order: Mycoplasmoidales
- Family: Mycoplasmoidaceae
- Genus: Ureaplasma
- Species: U. diversum

Binomial name
- Ureaplasma diversum Howard and Gourlay 1982

Species of bacterium

Ureaplasma diversum is a species of Ureaplasma, a genus of bacteria belonging to the family Mycoplasmataceae. It possesses the sequence accession no. (16S rRNA gene) for the type strain: D78650.
