= Ureaplasma felinum =

Scientific classification
- Domain: Bacteria
- Kingdom: Bacillati
- Phylum: Mycoplasmatota
- Class: Mollicutes
- Order: Mycoplasmatales
- Family: Mycoplasmataceae
- Genus: Ureaplasma
- Species: U. felinum

Binomial name
- Ureaplasma felinum Harasawa et al. 1990

Species of bacterium

Ureaplasma felinum is a species of Ureaplasma, a genus of bacteria belonging to the family Mycoplasmataceae. It has been isolated from cats. It possesses the sequence accession no. (16S rRNA gene) for the type strain: D78651.
