= List of antimicrobial peptides in the female reproductive tract =

Antimicrobial peptides are short peptides that possess antimicrobial properties. The female reproductive tract and its tissues produce antimicrobial peptides as part of the immune response. These peptides are able to fight pathogens and at the same time allow the maintenance of the microbiota that are part of the reproductive system in women.

- Defensins
  - alpha-Defensins
  - beta-Defensins
  - theta-defensins
- Cathelicidins
- LL-37
- Whey acid proteins
- SLPI
- Elafin
- HE-4
- Lysozyme
- S100 proteins
  - Calpotectin
  - Psoriasin (S100A7)
- C-type lectins
  - SP-A
  - SP-D
- Iron metabolism proteins
  - Lactoferrin
- Kinocidins
  - CCL20/Mip-3-alpha
