= Ureaplasma loridis =

Scientific classification
- Domain: Bacteria
- Kingdom: Bacillati
- Phylum: Mycoplasmatota
- Class: Mollicutes
- Order: Mycoplasmoidales
- Family: Mycoplasmoidaceae
- Genus: Ureaplasma
- Species: U. loridis

Binomial name
- Ureaplasma loridis

Species of bacterium

Ureaplasma loridis is a species of Ureaplasma, a genus of bacteria belonging to the family Mycoplasmataceae.
