= Ureaplasma gallorale =

Scientific classification
- Domain: Bacteria
- Kingdom: Bacillati
- Phylum: Mycoplasmatota
- Class: Mollicutes
- Order: Mycoplasmatales
- Family: Mycoplasmataceae
- Genus: Ureaplasma
- Species: U. gallorale

Binomial name
- Ureaplasma gallorale Koshimizu et al. 1987

Species of bacterium

Ureaplasma gallorale is a species of Ureaplasma, a genus of bacteria belonging to the family Mycoplasmataceae. It has been isolated from chickens and barnyard fowl. It possesses the sequence accession no. (16S rRNA gene) for the type strain: U62937. It is a commensal species with its host organism but has the ability to colonize and create infection. In the presence of virulence factors (H_{2}O_{2}, antigen proteins, etc.) is when these species start to over colonize . They have relatively small genomes, utilizing their host organisms natural processes to further their growth and survival. Nutrient required by the Ureaplasma species to continue metabolism are taken directly from the host. They proliferate in environments with a pH of 6.0-6.5 and a temperature of 35-37 °C. These characteristics are common to most biological environments which is why Ureaplasma species regularly cause infection. These infections can be found in the genital and respiratory tracks of avian species (chickens and turkey). Ureaplasma gallorale infections cannot always be managed by the host due to the mechanisms the bacteria have adapted. A host will release immune signals of IgA molecules to the bacterial cells to signify infection but the Ureaplasmas can secrete an enzyme known as IgAse that destroys IgA, rendering the signal inactive and leaving the host susceptible to health concerns. These infections, known as the condition Ureaplasmosis, have further ramifications for the barnyard fowl such as low egg production, weight loss, reduced feed conversion efficiency and even death. These health issues are a serious concern in maintaining adequate production for the agricultural industry.

== Classification ==
All species of Ureaplasma appear as gram-negative bacteria that utilize the hydrolysis of urea to produce energy for growth. Products of urea hydrolysis include carbon dioxide and ammonia. This reaction is coordinated by the enzyme urease, which Ureaplasma species potently secrete. Unlike most microorganisms, species of Ureaplasma lack a cell wall. Ureaplasma gallorale is further characterized as appearing only in avian species. In an experimental study, they found the 16s rDNA sequence for Ureaplasma galllorale was not able to be amplified by the same PCR primers used to amplify mammalian Ureaplasma species, suggesting a genetic differentiation in these sequences. The genome size is indicative of the organisms complete reliance on the compounds produced from the host. The Ureaplasma gallorale species, along with the other Ureaplasma species, are missing key biological pathways due to their small genomes but survive through absorption of the compounds found in their microenvironment.
