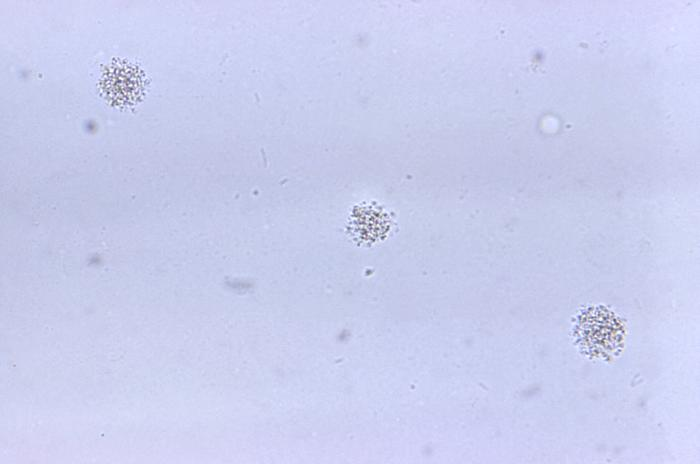
- A number of medium-sized, Ureaplasma urealyticum colonies, otherwise known as T-strain mycoplasma, under magnification of 500×

Scientific classification
- Domain: Bacteria
- Kingdom: Bacillati
- Phylum: Mycoplasmatota
- Class: Mollicutes
- Order: Mycoplasmoidales
- Family: Mycoplasmoidaceae
- Genus: Ureaplasma; Shepard et al. 1974

Type species
- Ureaplasma urealyticum Shepard et al. 1974

Species
- See text

= Ureaplasma =

Genus of bacteria

Ureaplasma is a genus of bacteria belonging to the family Mycoplasmataceae. As the name implies, Ureaplasma is urease positive.

== Phylogeny ==
The currently accepted taxonomy is based on the List of Prokaryotic names with Standing in Nomenclature (LPSN) and National Center for Biotechnology Information (NCBI).

16S rRNA based LTP_10_2024

- Ureaplasma
  - - U. miroungigenitalium Volokhov et al. 2020
    - U. zalophigenitalium Volokhov et al. 2020
  - - - U. diversum Howard & Gourlay 1982
      - U. gallorale Koshimizu et al. 1987
    - - - U. parvum Robertson et al. 2002
        - U. urealyticum Shepard et al. 1974
      - - U. canigenitalium Harasawa et al. 1993
        - - U. cati Harasawa et al. 1990
          - U. felinum Harasawa et al. 1990

120 marker proteins based GTDB 09-RS220

- Ureaplasma
  - "Ca. U. intestinipullorum" Gilroy et al. 2021
  - - - U. miroungigenitalium
      - U. zalophigenitalium
    - - U. canigenitalium
      - - U. diversum
        - - U. parvum
          - U. urealyticum

Unassigned species:

- "U. loridis" Chalker, Paterson & Brownlie 2003

== See also ==
- List of bacterial orders
- List of bacteria genera
