= CharProtDB =

Protein database

Content
- Description: experimentally characterized protein annotations.

Contact
- Research center: J Craig Venter institute
- Authors: Ramana Madupu
- Primary citation: Madupu & al. (2012)
- Release date: 2011

Access
- Website: www.jcvi.org/charprotdb/

CharProtDB is a curated database of biochemically characterized proteins.
