= Ureaplasma parvum =

Scientific classification
- Domain: Bacteria
- Kingdom: Bacillati
- Phylum: Mycoplasmatota
- Class: Mollicutes
- Order: Mycoplasmoidales
- Family: Mycoplasmoidaceae
- Genus: Ureaplasma
- Species: U. parvum

Binomial name
- Ureaplasma parvum Robertson et al. 2002

Species of bacterium

Ureaplasma parvum is a species of Ureaplasma, a genus of bacteria belonging to the family Mycoplasmataceae.

Ureaplasma parvum was formerly known as Ureaplasma urealyticum biovar 1. Ureaplasma parvum has been identified as being a commensal in the female reproductive tract as part of the microbiome in healthy women of reproductive age.

== Classification ==
Ureaplasma spp. are one of the smallest known clonal bacteria. They are closely related to mycoplasmas as they lack a peptidoglycan cell wall, metabolize cholesterol, and require urea for ATP synthesis. The Ureaplasma genus has 14 serotypes that are classified based on the 16S rRNA gene, the urease gene, and the multiple-banded antigen (MBA) gene. U. parvum has four serotypes (-1, -3, -6, -14) that were differentiated by variations in the MBA gene, a Ureaplasma surface antigen protein. Although U. parvum is known to be a commensal microorganism within healthy humans, its ability to become pathogenic may be due to its ability to easily acquire new genes via horizontal gene transfer (HGT). Sequencing of U. parvum samples isolated from clinical patients reveals a much more diverse set of strains (at least 19), suggesting that further methods of classifying U. parvum should be investigated.

== Clinical relevance ==
The clinical implications concerning the pathogenicity of U. parvum have yet to be determined because of its recent establishment as a separate species from U. urealyticum. Due to the species heterogeneity in Ureaplasma spp. not being noted in clinical studies prior to their distinction from each other, it is possible that U. urealyticum is disproportionately overrepresented compared to U. parvum. As a consequence, interpreting data on Ureaplasma parvum can be difficult since there are currently few studies that differentiate between the Ureaplasma spp. Therefore, there is little substantial evidence that U. parvum causes any of the diseases that have been associated with U. urealyticum, specifically inflammatory vulvovaginitis, male infertility and non-gonococcal urethritis (NGU), female urethritis and urethral pain syndrome, pelvic inflammatory disease, cervicitis, ectopic pregnancy, and female infertility. It is important for future studies to accurately differentiate between U. urealyticum and U. parvum, as this will aid in the etiological analysis of NGU and other diseases.

There is no evidence of any role of U. parvum in cervicitis.

Ureaplasma spp. lack a cell wall and are therefore resistant to antimicrobials that specifically attack the cell wall. For this reason, Ureaplasma spp. are particularly difficult to diagnose and eradicate, and unnecessary treatment can further encourage antimicrobial resistance. As a result, extensive testing and treatment of the Ureaplasma spp. is not always recommended. Ureaplasma parvum is usually part of the normal genital flora. Rarely can it cause invasive infections such as genitourinary infections, septic arthritis, or meningitis.

== Commensalism ==
Ureaplasma parvum is commensal in both males and females, where it attaches itself to the mucosal lining of the urogenital tract. Damage to mucosal linings results in the relocation of Ureaplasma spp. to other physiological areas of the body, which can lead to infection and disease. U. parvum has been investigated as an opportunistic pathogen, however current studies question its contribution to urogenital infections. For example, a study conducted by Rumyantseva et al. showed that in female patients with varying vaginal microflora, U. parvum was the most prevalent mycoplasma. In normal vaginal microflora, 43.5% of samples were U. parvum positive. Bacterial vaginosis and aerobic vaginitis samples were 59.9% and 23.9% U. parvum positive, respectively. This study supports the symbiotic considerations between vaginal microflora (primarily normal and bacterial vaginosis) and mycoplasma such as U. parvum.

== Ureaplasma parvum in males ==
Ureaplasma parvum (and U. urealyticum) have been linked to nongonococcal urethritis (NGU), but the Ureaplasma spp. have also been found in many healthy men, allowing for considerable skepticism that the two are correlated. Similarly, links to prostatitis and infertility are difficult to establish due to its presence in control groups. In andrology studies, the presence of U. parvum in semen has been found to be significant. Various Ureaplasma spp. isolates have been detected in semen via polymerase chain reaction (PCR) and immunofluorescent antibody assay. In 36.6% of washed samples, U. parvum was present. Andrology studies surrounding U. parvum demonstrated that the bacteria can remain on the spermatozoa even after washing.
