= Carlos Simon (gynaecologist) =

Spanish researcher, obstetrician, and gynecologist

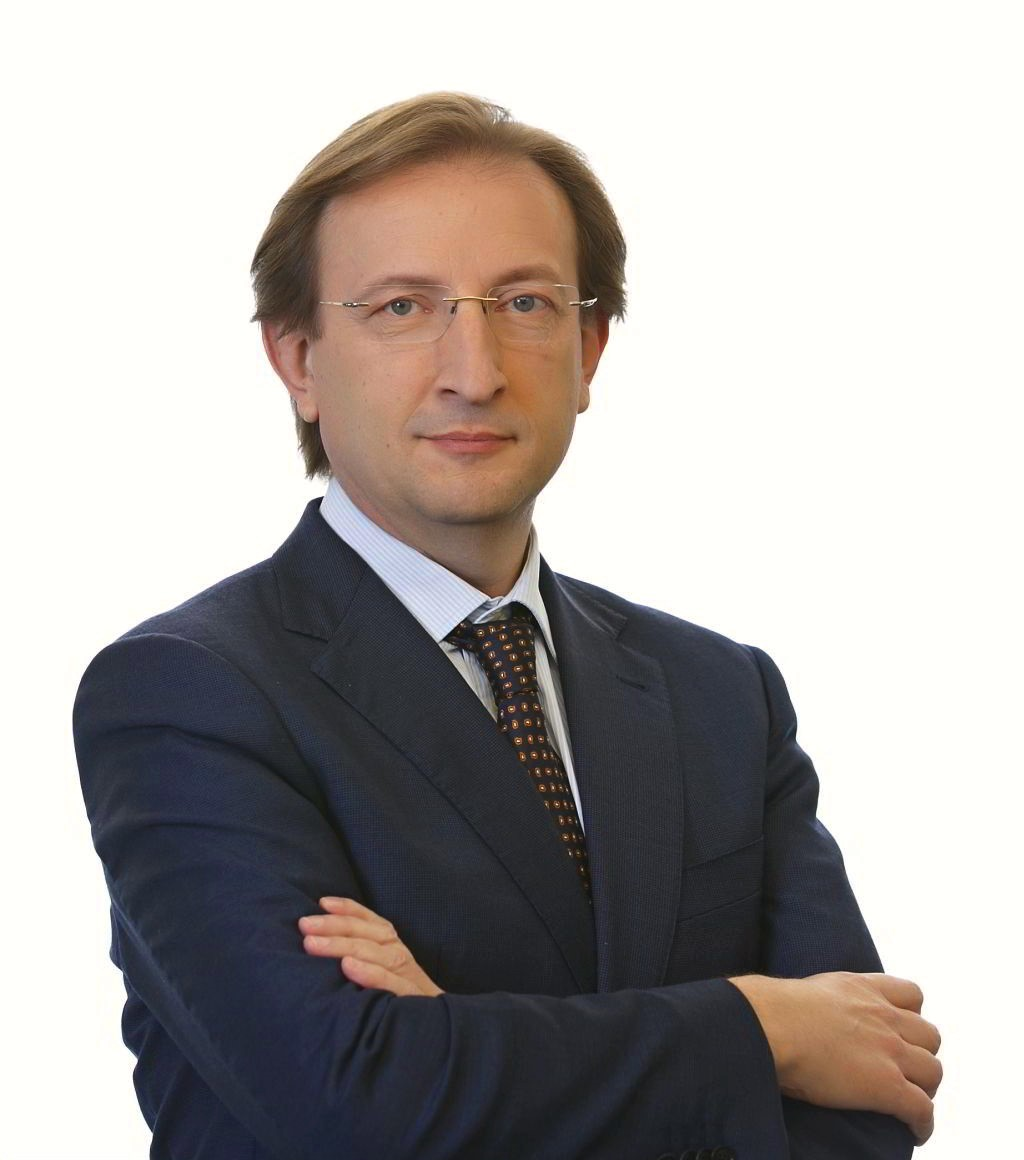
Carlos Simon Valles

Carlos Simón Vallés (Buñol, province of Valencia, 1961) is a Spanish clinical researcher, obstetrician, and gynecologist. He is a Professor of Obstetrics and Gynecology at the University of Valencia, an adjunct professor at Harvard University, and an international expert in assisted reproduction.

== Biography ==
After graduating in Medicine and Surgery at the University of Valencia (1985) with the Outstanding and Extraordinary Degree Award, he became a predoctoral fellow in the Department of Education, Culture and Sport of the Generalitat Valenciana. He completed his doctorate in Medicine and Surgery at the University of Valencia (Apto Cum Laude, 1986) with a doctoral thesis titled "Culture of Amniotic and Chorionic Liquid Amnion Cells. Chorionic biopsy as a diagnostic alternative in the first trimester of pregnancy." He became a specialist in Obstetrics and Gynecology after passing the médico interno residente examination in 1987. He completed his residency in the Department of Obstetrics and Gynecology at the Hospital Clínico Universitario de Valencia (1987–1990) under the direction of Professor Fernando Bonilla. He was an attending physician in this same department until September 1991.

He continued his research training through a postdoctoral fellowship from the Ministry of Education and Science in reproductive endocrinology in the Department of Obstetrics and Gynecology at Stanford University, California (USA, 1991–1994). Having completed his clinical and research training, he directed his career to applied medical research in reproductive and regenerative medicine. He is a Clinical Assistant Professor of Obstetrics and Gynecology at Stanford University (since 2013) and Assistant Professor of Obstetrics and Gynecology at Baylor College of Medicine, Houston, Texas (since 2014).

Due to his pioneering work in Spain on stem cells, he was appointed director of the Valencia Node of the National Stem Cell Bank located at the Centro de Investigación Príncipe Felipe (CIPF), coordinator of the area of Regenerative Medicine (2004–2007), and scientific director of the CIPF (2009–2011).

He has also held visiting professorships at the Universities of Stanford and Yale (USA), Hong Kong (China), and Adelaide (Australia).

He is the inventor of fifteen active patents, which led to the creation of the biotechnology company Igenomix S.L., which has laboratories in Valencia, Sao Paulo, Delhi, Los Angeles, Miami, Dubai, New Jersey, Mexico City, Montreal, and Istanbul.

He is the founder and co-president of the Carlos Simón Foundation for Research in Women's Health.

He has four children.

== Awards and distinctions ==
- King Jaime I Award for Medical Research (2011) for a pioneering study on alterations in human endometrial receptivity, one of the most important causes of infertility in the world.
- Favorite Son of Buñol (2011).
- Distinguished Researcher Award (2016) in recognition of his research career, his pioneering contributions, basic and clinical, in the field of reproductive medicine.
- Lilly Foundation Biomedical Research Award (2021), in the category of Clinical Research, for his pioneering work in studying the human endometrium and its functionality

== Academies and associations ==
- Corresponding member of the Royal Academy of Medicine of the Valencian Community.
- Member of "The Strategic Advisory Board of the Department of Development and Regeneration," Catholic University of Leuven (Belgium).
- Scientific advisor to "Ovascience" (Boston)" and "The Advisory Board".
- Scientific consultant to the World Health Organization as a member of the Human Reproduction Programme Scientific and Ethical Review Group since 1998.
- Spanish representative in the International Society for Stem Cell Research (ISSCR).

== Scientific production ==
Since 1991, he has contributed pioneering research and clinical solutions to infertility-associated problems experienced by 10% of couples of reproductive age worldwide. He has worked on the clinical demonstration and molecular mechanisms that control the deleterious effect of high estradiol levels, changing clinical practice in the use and initiating the concept of "mild stimulation." Using microarray technology, he identified the transcriptomic signature of genes involved in human endometrial receptivity. He has published his findings in twenty papers as the first or last author; the first has been highlighted as the most cited in the Molecular Human Reproduction journal. The clinical translation of his results has given rise to a patent for creating a customized endometrial receptivity array (ERA) for the molecular diagnosis of endometrial receptivity in infertile patients. He has also created an open-access database on endometrial receptivity managed by the University of Valencia. Finally, thanks to funding a PROMETEO project of excellence to investigate the origin of human endometrial stem cells, he discovered endometrial stem cells that, in isolation, can reconstruct the human endometrium.

Since 2001, his work in human embryology has allowed him to expand his research in pluripotent stem cells leading to the derivation, characterization, publication, and registration of 10 human embryonic stem cell lines in the National Cell Line Bank. He was the pioneer in the derivation of the first embryonic stem cell lines in Spain. He has participated with the VAL lines in demonstrating the lack of genetic diversity of the world's most widely used cell lines.

== Publications ==
- Simón C, Pellicer A, editors. Regulators of human implantation. Oxford (UK): Oxford University Press; 1995.
- Remohí J, Simón C, Pellicer A, Bonilla-Musoles F, editors. Reproducción humana. Madrid (ESP): McGraw-Hill Interamericana; 1996.
- Rodríguez L, Bonilla F, Pellicer A, Simón C, Remohí J, editors. Manual práctico de reproducaó humana. Rio de Janeiro (BRA): Livraria e Editora RevinterLtda; 1998.
- Pellicer A, Simón C, Bonilla-Musoles F, Remohí J, editors. Ovarian hyperstimulation syndrome. Pathophysiology, prevention and treatment. Rome (ITA): SeronoFertility Series; 1999.
- Simón C, Pellicer A, Remohí J, editors. Emerging concepts on human implantation. Oxford (UK): Oxford University Press; 1999.
- Remohí J, Romero JL, Pellicer A, Simón C, Navarro J, editors. Manual práctico de esterilidad y reproducción humana. Madrid (ESP): McGraw-Hill Interamericana; 2000.
- Simón C, Pellicer A, Doberska C, editors. Human implantation: recent advances and clinical aspects. Cambridge (UK): The Journal of Reproduction and Fertility Ltd; 2000.
- Simón C, Pellicer A, editors. Proceedings of de 2nd international workshop on human implantation recent advances and clinical aspects. Elsevier; 2001.
- Remohí J, Pellicer A, Simón C, Navarro J, editors. Reproducción humana. 2nd ed. Madrid (ESP): McGraw-Hill Interamericana; 2002.
- Scheffer BB, Remohí J, García-Velasco JA, Pellicer A, Simón C, editors. Reprodução humana asistida. São Paulo (BRA): Atheneu; 2003.
- Remohí J, Cobo A, Romero JL, Pellicer A, Simón C, editors. Manual práctico de esterilidad y reproducción humana. 2nd ed. Madrid (ESP): Mc Graw-Hill. Interamericana; 2004.
- Simón C, Pellicer A, editors. Stem cells in human reproduction, basic science and therapeutic potential. London (UK): InformaHealthcare; 2007.
- Simón C, Horcajadas JA, García-Velasco JA, Pellicer A, editors. El endometrio humano. Desde la investigación a la clínica. Buenos Aires (ARG); Madrid (ESP): Médica Panamericana; 2009.
- Simón C, Pellicer A, editors. Stem cells in human reproduction, basic science and therapeutic potential. 2nd ed. London (UK): InformaHealthcare; 2009.
- Simón C, Pellicer A, Renee Reijo Pera, editors. Stem Cells in Reproductive Medicine, Basic Science and Therapeutic Potential. 3rd ed. London (UK): Cambridge University Press; 2013. ISBN 978-1-107-03447-1
- Simón C, Giudice L, editors. The Essential Uterine Handbook: Current Applications in Clinical Medicine. (USA) CRC Press; 2017.
- Flaws J, Jegou B, McCarrey J, Niederberger C, Simón C, Skinner M, Spencer T, Swanson, Yan W, editors. Encyclopedia of Reproduction. 2nd ed. Elsevier. (USA); 2018.
- Simón C, Rubio C, editors. Handbook of New Genetic Diagnostic Technologies in Reproductive Medicine. (USA) CRC Press; 2018.
- Simón C, Rubio C. Embryo Genetics. MDPI. (CHE); 2021.
- Simón C, Rubio C, editors. Handbook of New Genetic Diagnostic Technologies in Reproductive Medicine, 2nd Edition. Taylor & Francis (USA); 2022.
