= Microbiota =

Community of microorganisms

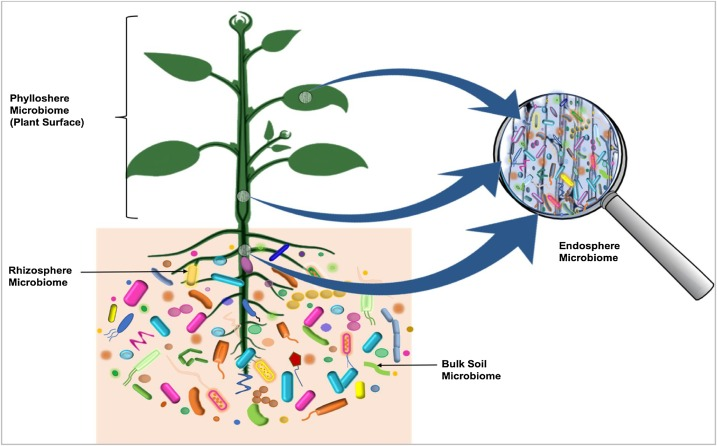
Diverse microbial communities of characteristic microbiota are part of plant microbiomes, and are found on the outside surfaces and in the internal tissues of the host plant, as well as in the surrounding soil.

Microbiota are the range of microorganisms that may be commensal, mutualistic, or pathogenic found in and on all multicellular organisms, including plants. Microbiota include bacteria, archaea, protists, fungi, and viruses, and have been found to be crucial for immunologic, hormonal, and metabolic homeostasis of their host.

The term microbiome describes either the collective genomes of the microbes that reside in an ecological niche or else the microbes themselves.

The microbiome and host emerged during evolution as a synergistic unit from epigenetics and genetic characteristics, sometimes collectively referred to as a holobiont. The presence of microbiota in human and other metazoan guts has been critical for understanding the co-evolution between metazoans and bacteria. Microbiota play key roles in the intestinal immune and metabolic responses via their fermentation product (short-chain fatty acid), acetate.

== Introduction ==
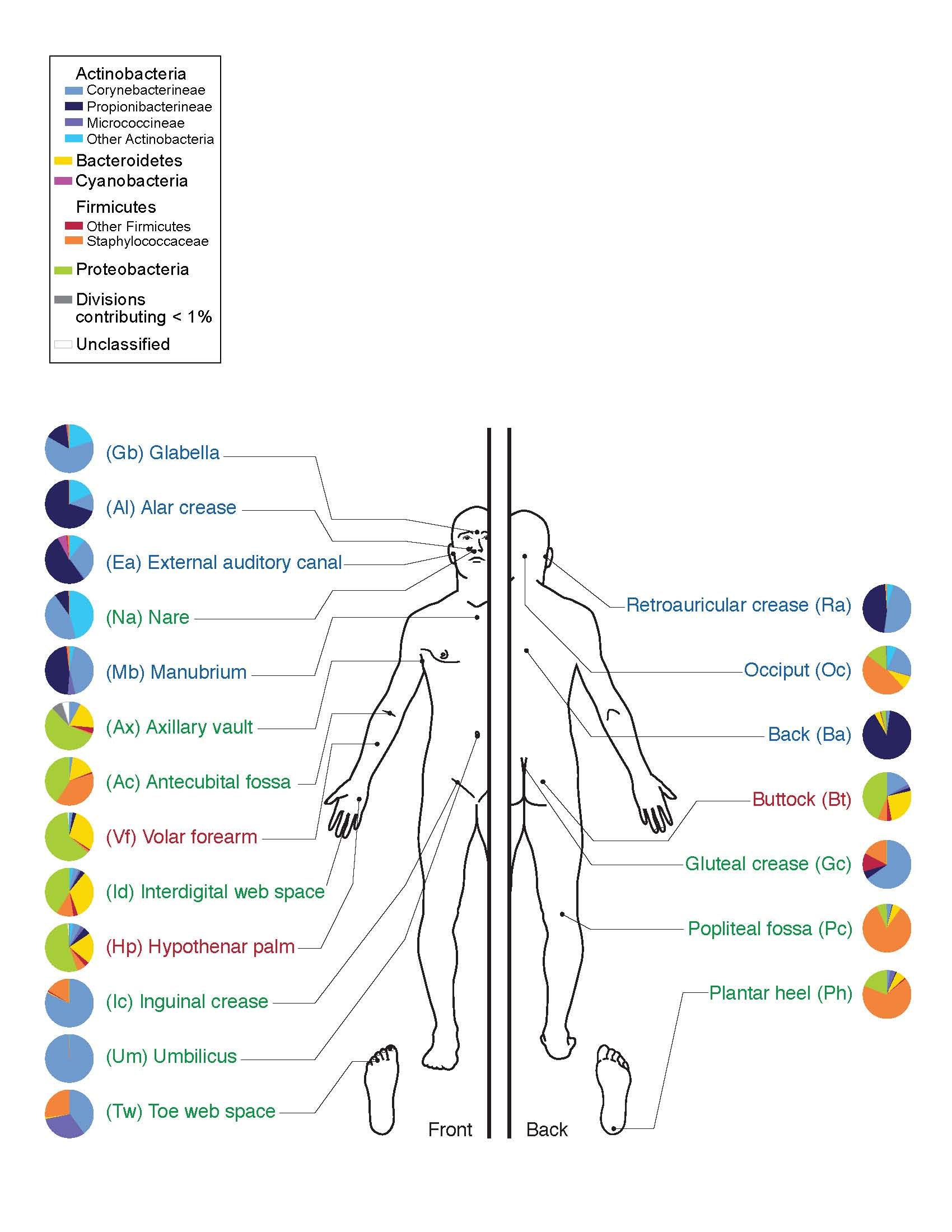
The predominant species of bacteria on human skin

All plants and animals, from simple life forms to humans, live in close association with microbial organisms. Several advances have driven the perception of microbiomes, including:

- the ability to perform genomic and gene expression analyses of single cells and of entire microbial communities in the disciplines of metagenomics and metatranscriptomics
- databases accessible to researchers across multiple disciplines
- methods of mathematical analysis suitable for complex data sets

Biologists discovered that microbes make up an important part of an organism's phenotype, far beyond the occasional symbiotic case study.

=== Types of microbe-host relationships ===
Commensalism, a concept developed by Pierre-Joseph van Beneden (1809–1894), a Belgian professor at the University of Louvain during the nineteenth century is central to the microbiome, where microbiota colonize a host in a non-harmful coexistence. The relationship with their host is called mutualistic when organisms perform tasks that are known to be useful for the host, parasitic, when disadvantageous to the host. Other authors define a situation as mutualistic where both benefit, and commensal, where the unaffected host benefits the symbiont. A nutrient exchange may be bidirectional or unidirectional, may be context dependent and may occur in diverse ways. Microbiota that are expected to be present, and that under normal circumstances do not cause disease, are deemed normal flora or normal microbiota; normal flora can not only be harmless, but can be protective of the host.

=== Acquisition and change ===
The initial acquisition of microbiota in animals from mammalians to marine sponges is at birth, and may even occur through the germ cell line. In plants, the colonizing process can be initiated below ground in the root zone, around the germinating seed, the spermosphere, or originate from the above ground parts, the phyllosphere and the flower zone or anthosphere. The stability of the rhizosphere microbiota over generations depends upon the plant type but even more on the soil composition, i.e. living and non living environment. Clinically, new microbiota can be acquired through fecal microbiota transplant to treat infections such as chronic C. difficile infection.

== Microbiota by host ==
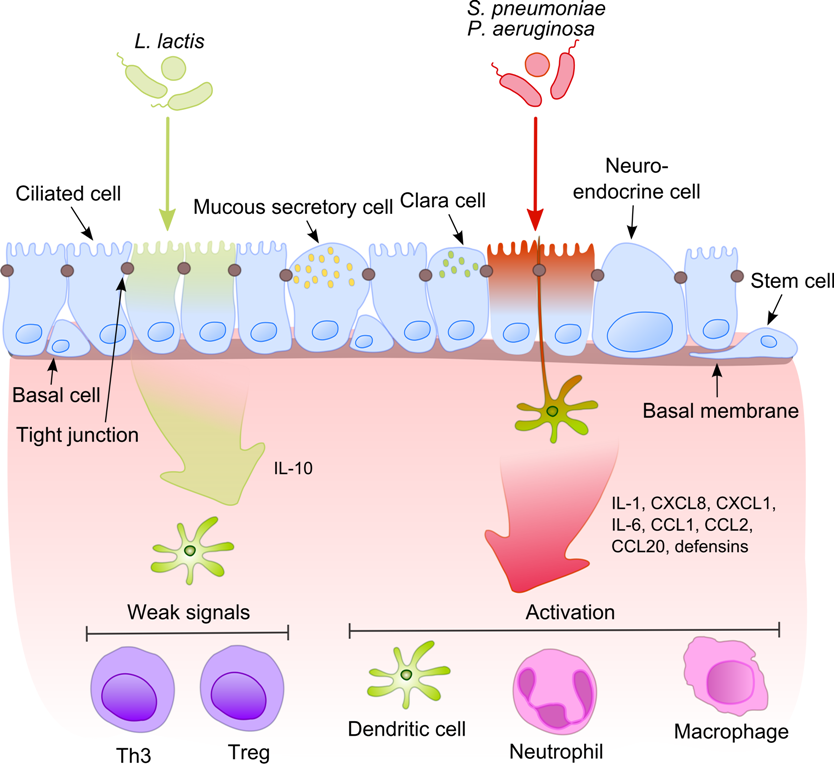
Pathogenic microbiota causing inflammation in the lung

=== Humans ===
The human microbiota includes bacteria, fungi, archaea and viruses. Micro-animals which live on the human body are excluded. The human microbiome refers to their collective genomes.

Humans are colonized by many microorganisms; the traditional estimate was that humans live with ten times more non-human cells than human cells; more recent estimates have lowered this to 3:1 and even to about 1:1 by number (1:350 by mass).

In fact, these are so small that there are around 100 trillion microbiota on the human body, around 39 trillion by revised estimates, with only 0.2 kg of total mass in a "reference" 70 kg human body.

The Human Microbiome Project sequenced the genome of the human microbiota, focusing particularly on the microbiota that normally inhabit the skin, mouth, nose, digestive tract, and vagina. It reached a milestone in 2012 when it published initial results.

=== Non-human animals ===
- Amphibians have microbiota on their skin. Some species are able to carry a fungus named Batrachochytrium dendrobatidis, which in others can cause a deadly infection Chytridiomycosis depending on their microbiome, resisting pathogen colonization or inhibiting their growth with antimicrobial skin peptides.
- Newborn marsupials are born with histologically immature immune tissues and unable to mount their own specific immune defence. They are therefore heavily reliant on their mother's immune system and the milk for their protection. Most marsupials have pouches, and their own microbiota changes throughout the reproductive stages: oestrus, birth/oestrus, and post-oestrus. Some pouch and skin secretions have had antimicrobial peptides identified, that presumably support the young at this vulnerable time.
- In mammals, herbivores such as cattle depend on their rumen microbiome to convert cellulose into proteins, short chain fatty acids, and gases. Culture methods cannot provide information on all microorganisms present. Comparative metagenomic studies yielded the surprising result that individual cattle possess markedly different community structures, predicted phenotype, and metabolic potentials, even though they were fed identical diets, were housed together, and were apparently functionally identical in their utilization of plant cell wall resources.
- Mice have become the most studied mammalian regarding their microbiomes. The gut microbiota have been studied in relation to allergic airway disease, obesity, gastrointestinal diseases and diabetes. Perinatal shifting of microbiota through low dose antibiotics can have long-lasting effects on future susceptibility to allergic airway disease. The frequency of certain subsets of microbes has been linked to disease severity. The presence of specific microbes early in postnatal life, instruct future immune responses. In gnotobiotic mice certain gut bacteria were found to transmit a particular phenotype to recipient germ-free mice, that promoted accumulation of colonic regulatory T cells, and strains that modulated mouse adiposity and cecal metabolite concentrations. This combinatorial approach enables a systems-level understanding of microbial contributions to human biology. But also other mucoide tissues as lung and vagina have been studied in relation to diseases such as asthma, allergy and vaginosis.
- Insects have their own microbiomes. For example, leaf-cutter ants form huge underground colonies harvesting hundreds of kilograms of leaves each year and are unable to digest the cellulose in the leaves directly. They maintain fungus gardens as the colony's primary food source. While the fungus itself does not digest cellulose, a microbial community containing a diversity of bacteria is doing so. Analysis of the microbial population's genome revealed many genes with a role in cellulose digestion. This microbiome's predicted carbohydrate-degrading enzyme profile is similar to that of the bovine rumen, but the species composition is almost entirely different. Gut microbiota of the fruit fly can affect the way its gut looks, by impacting epithelial renewal rate, cellular spacing, and the composition of different cell types in the epithelium. When the moth Spodoptera exigua is infected with baculovirus immune-related genes are downregulated and the amount of its gut microbiota increases. In the dipteran intestine, enteroendocrine cells sense the gut microbiota-derived metabolites and coordinate antibacterial, mechanical, and metabolic branches of the host intestinal innate immune response to the commensal microbiota.
- Fish have their own microbiomes, including the short-lived species Nothobranchius furzeri (turquoise killifish). Transferring the gut microbiota from young killfish into middle-aged killifish significantly extends the lifespans of the middle-aged killfish.

=== Plants ===
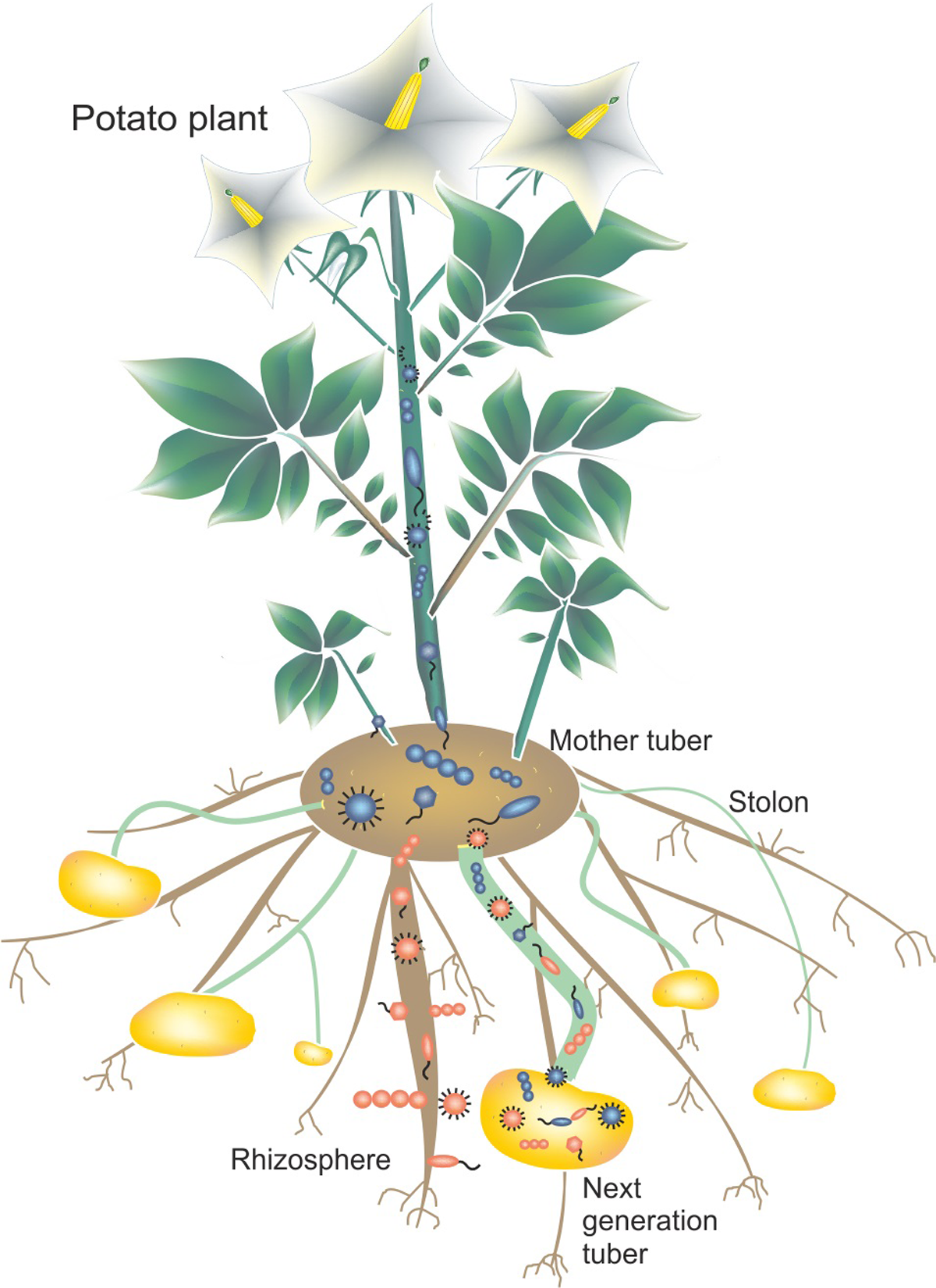
Routes of colonization of potato tubers by bacteria

The plant microbiome was recently discovered to originate from the seed. Microorganism which are transmitted via seed migrate into the developing seedling in a specific route in which certain community move to the leaves and others to the roots. In the diagram on the right, microbiota colonizing the rhizosphere, entering the roots and colonizing the next tuber generation via the stolons, are visualized with a red color. Bacteria present in the mother tuber, passing through the stolons and migrating into the plant as well as into the next generation of tubers are shown in blue.

- The soil is the main reservoir for bacteria that colonize potato tubers
- Bacteria are recruited from the soil more or less independent of the potato variety
- Bacteria might colonize the tubers predominantly from the inside of plants via the stolon
- The bacterial microbiota of potato tubers consists of bacteria transmitted from one tuber generation to the next and bacteria recruited from the soil colonize potato plants via the root.

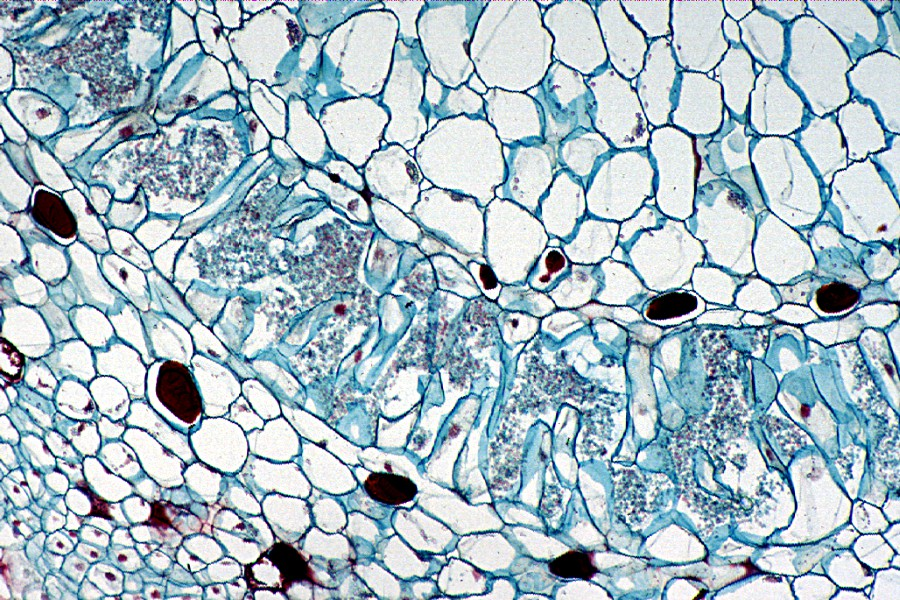
Light micrograph of a cross section of a coralloid root of a cycad, showing the layer that hosts symbiotic cyanobacteria

Plants are attractive hosts for microorganisms since they provide a variety of nutrients. Microorganisms on plants can be epiphytes (found on the plants) or endophytes (found inside plant tissue). Oomycetes and fungi have, through convergent evolution, developed similar morphology and occupy similar ecological niches. They develop hyphae, threadlike structures that penetrate the host cell. In mutualistic situations the plant often exchanges hexose sugars for inorganic phosphate from the fungal symbiont. It is speculated that such very ancient associations have aided plants when they first colonized land. Plant-growth promoting bacteria (PGPB) provide the plant with essential services such as nitrogen fixation, solubilization of minerals such as phosphorus, synthesis of plant hormones, direct enhancement of mineral uptake, and protection from pathogens. PGPBs may protect plants from pathogens by competing with the pathogen for an ecological niche or a substrate, producing inhibitory allelochemicals, or inducing systemic resistance in host plants to the pathogen

== Research ==
The symbiotic relationship between a host and its microbiota is under laboratory research for how it may shape the immune system of mammals. In many animals, the immune system and microbiota may engage in "cross-talk" by exchanging chemical signals, which may enable the microbiota to influence immune reactivity and targeting. Bacteria can be transferred from mother to child through direct contact and after birth. As the infant microbiome is established, commensal bacteria quickly populate the gut, prompting a range of immune responses and "programming" the immune system with long-lasting effects. The bacteria are able to stimulate lymphoid tissue associated with the gut mucosa, which enables the tissue to produce antibodies for pathogens that may enter the gut.

The human microbiome may play a role in the activation of toll-like receptors in the intestines, a type of pattern recognition receptor host cells use to recognize dangers and repair damage. Pathogens can influence this coexistence leading to immune dysregulation including and susceptibility to diseases, mechanisms of inflammation, immune tolerance, and autoimmune diseases.

== Co-evolution of microbiota ==
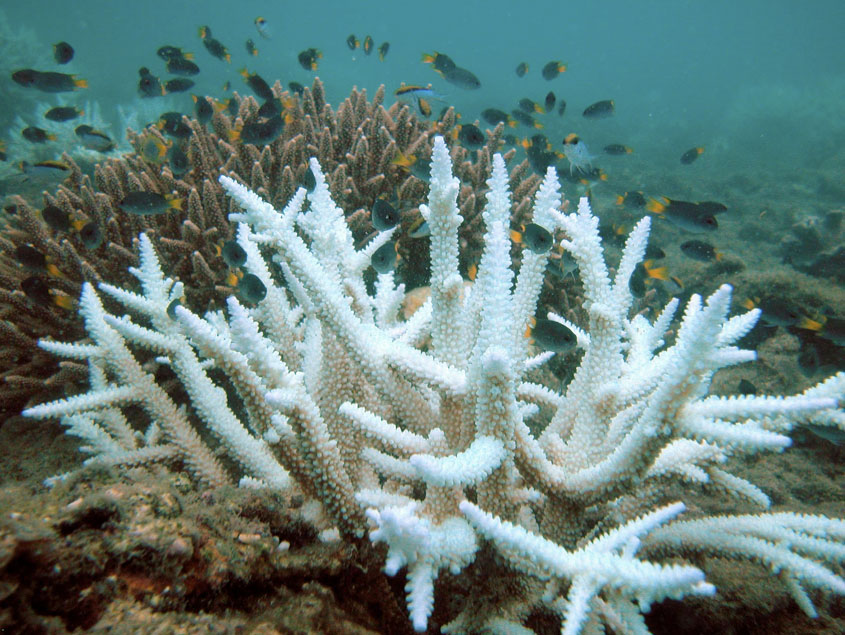
Bleached branching coral (foreground) and normal branching coral (background). Keppel Islands, Great Barrier Reef.

Organisms evolve within ecosystems so that the change of one organism affects the change of others. The hologenome theory of evolution proposes that an object of natural selection is not the individual organism, but the organism together with its associated organisms, including its microbial communities.

Coral reefs. The hologenome theory originated in studies on coral reefs. Coral reefs are the largest structures created by living organisms, and contain abundant and highly complex microbial communities. Over the past several decades, major declines in coral populations have occurred. Climate change, water pollution and over-fishing are three stress factors that have been described as leading to disease susceptibility. Over twenty different coral diseases have been described, but of these, only a handful have had their causative agents isolated and characterized. Coral bleaching is the most serious of these diseases. In the Mediterranean Sea, the bleaching of Oculina patagonica was first described in 1994 and shortly determined to be due to infection by Vibrio shiloi. From 1994 to 2002, bacterial bleaching of O. patagonica occurred every summer in the eastern Mediterranean. Surprisingly, however, after 2003, O. patagonica in the eastern Mediterranean has been resistant to V. shiloi infection, although other diseases still cause bleaching. The surprise stems from the knowledge that corals are long lived, with lifespans on the order of decades, and do not have adaptive immune systems. Their innate immune systems do not produce antibodies, and they should seemingly not be able to respond to new challenges except over evolutionary time scales.

The puzzle of how corals managed to acquire resistance to a specific pathogen led to a 2007 proposal, that a dynamic relationship exists between corals and their symbiotic microbial communities. It is thought that by altering its composition, the holobiont can adapt to changing environmental conditions far more rapidly than by genetic mutation and selection alone. Extrapolating this hypothesis to other organisms, including higher plants and animals, led to the proposal of the hologenome theory of evolution.

As of 2007 the hologenome theory was still being debated. A major criticism has been the claim that V. shiloi was misidentified as the causative agent of coral bleaching, and that its presence in bleached O. patagonica was simply that of opportunistic colonization. If this is true, the basic observation leading to the theory would be invalid. The theory has gained significant popularity as a way of explaining rapid changes in adaptation that cannot otherwise be explained by traditional mechanisms of natural selection. Within the hologenome theory, the holobiont has not only become the principal unit of natural selection but also the result of other step of integration that it is also observed at the cell (symbiogenesis, endosymbiosis) and genomic levels.

== Research methods ==
=== Targeted amplicon sequencing ===
Targeted amplicon sequencing relies on having some expectations about the composition of the community that is being studied. In target amplicon sequencing a phylogenetically informative marker is targeted for sequencing. Such a marker should be present in ideally all the expected organisms. It should also evolve in such a way that it is conserved enough that primers can target genes from a wide range of organisms while evolving quickly enough to allow for finer resolution at the taxonomic level. A common marker for human microbiome studies is the gene for bacterial 16S rRNA (i.e. "16S rDNA", the sequence of DNA which encodes the ribosomal RNA molecule). Since ribosomes are present in all living organisms, using 16S rDNA allows for DNA to be amplified from many more organisms than if another marker were used. The 16S rRNA gene contains both slowly evolving regions and 9 fast evolving regions, also known as hypervariable regions (HVRs); the former can be used to design broad primers while the latter allow for finer taxonomic distinction. However, species-level resolution is not typically possible using the 16S rDNA. Primer selection is an important step, as anything that cannot be targeted by the primer will not be amplified and thus will not be detected, moreover different sets of primers can be selected to amplify different HVRs in the gene, or pairs of them. The appropriate choice of which HVRs to amplify has to be made according to the taxonomic groups of interest, as different target regions has been shown to influence taxonomical classification.

Targeted studies of eukaryotic and viral communities are limited and subject to the challenge of excluding host DNA from amplification and the reduced eukaryotic and viral biomass in the human microbiome.

After the amplicons are sequenced, molecular phylogenetic methods are used to infer the composition of the microbial community. This can be done through clustering methodologies, by clustering the amplicons into operational taxonomic units (OTUs); or alternatively with denoising methodologies, identifying amplicon sequence variants (ASVs).

Phylogenetic relationships are then inferred between the sequences. Due to the complexity of the data, distance measures such as UniFrac distances are usually defined between microbiome samples, and downstream multivariate methods are carried out on the distance matrices. An important point is that the scale of data is extensive, and further approaches must be taken to identify patterns from the available information. Tools used to analyze the data include VAMPS, QIIME, mothur and DADA2 or UNOISE3 for denoising.

=== Metagenomic sequencing ===
Metagenomics is also used extensively for studying microbial communities. In metagenomic sequencing, DNA is recovered directly from environmental samples in an untargeted manner with the goal of obtaining an unbiased sample from all genes of all members of the community. Recent studies use shotgun Sanger sequencing or pyrosequencing to recover the sequences of the reads. The reads can then be assembled into contigs. To determine the phylogenetic identity of a sequence, it is compared to available full genome sequences using methods such as BLAST. One drawback of this approach is that many members of microbial communities do not have a representative sequenced genome, but this applies to 16S rRNA amplicon sequencing as well and is a fundamental problem. With shotgun sequencing, it can be resolved by having a high coverage (50–100x) of the unknown genome, effectively doing a de novo genome assembly. As soon as there is a complete genome of an unknown organism available it can be compared phylogenetically and the organism put into its place in the tree of life, by creating new taxa. An emerging approach is to combine shotgun sequencing with proximity-ligation data (Hi-C) to assemble complete microbial genomes without culturing.

Despite the fact that metagenomics is limited by the availability of reference sequences, one significant advantage of metagenomics over targeted amplicon sequencing is that metagenomics data can elucidate the functional potential of the community DNA. Targeted gene surveys cannot do this as they only reveal the phylogenetic relationship between the same gene from different organisms. Functional analysis is done by comparing the recovered sequences to databases of metagenomic annotations such as KEGG. The metabolic pathways that these genes are involved in can then be predicted with tools such as MG-RAST, CAMERA and IMG/M.

=== RNA and protein-based approaches ===
Metatranscriptomics studies have been performed to study the gene expression of microbial communities through methods such as the pyrosequencing of extracted RNA. Structure based studies have also identified non-coding RNAs (ncRNAs) such as ribozymes from microbiota. Metaproteomics is an approach that studies the proteins expressed by microbiota, giving insight into its functional potential.

== Projects ==
The Human Microbiome Project launched in 2008 was a United States National Institutes of Health initiative to identify and characterize microorganisms found in both healthy and diseased humans. The five-year project, best characterized as a feasibility study with a budget of $115 million, tested how changes in the human microbiome are associated with human health or disease.

The Earth Microbiome Project (EMP) is an initiative to collect natural samples and analyze the microbial community around the globe. Microbes are highly abundant, diverse and have an important role in the ecological system. Yet as of 2010, it was estimated that the total global environmental DNA sequencing effort had produced less than 1 percent of the total DNA found in a liter of seawater or a gram of soil, and the specific interactions between microbes are largely unknown. The EMP aims to process as many as 200,000 samples in different biomes, generating a complete database of microbes on earth to characterize environments and ecosystems by microbial composition and interaction. Using these data, new ecological and evolutionary theories can be proposed and tested.

== Privacy issues ==
Microbial DNA inhabiting a person's human body can uniquely identify the person. A person's privacy may be compromised if the person anonymously donated microbe DNA data. Their medical condition and identity could be revealed.

== See also ==
- Anagenesis
- Biome
- Endophyte
- Human virome
- List of bacterial vaginosis microbiota
- Marine microbiota
- Microbiota of the lower reproductive tract of women
- Phytobiome
- Probiotic
- Psychobiotic
- Skin flora
- Vaginal flora
- Vaginal microbiota in pregnancy
