= Nonpathogenic organisms =

Organisms that do not cause disease

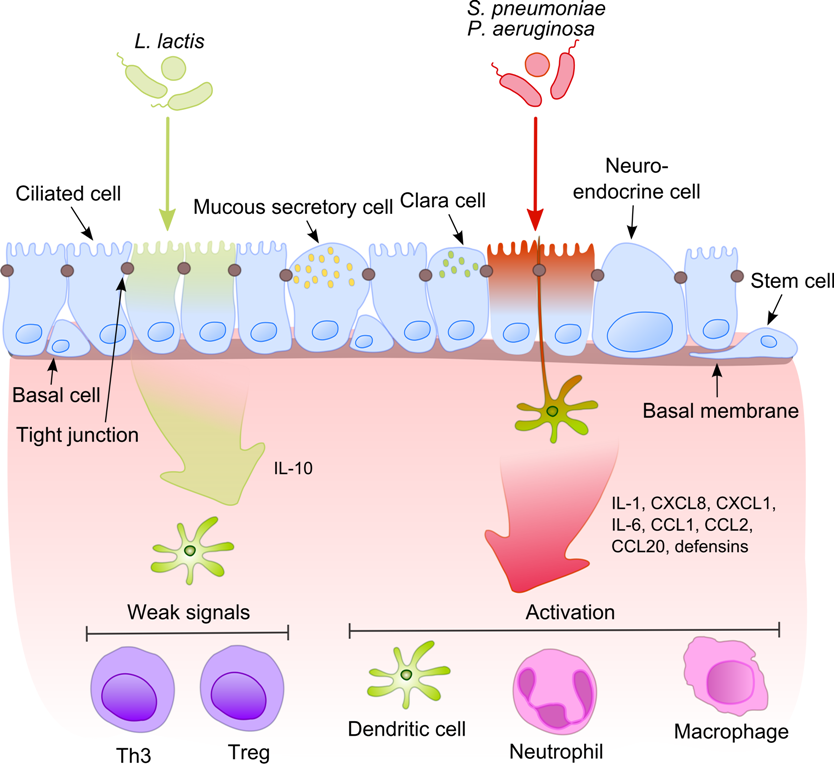
Commensals vs pathogens mechanism. Mechanisms underlying the inflammation in COPD. Airway epithelium has complex structure: consists of at least seven diverse cell types interacting with each other by means of tight junctions. Moreover, epithelial calls can deliver the signals into the underlying tissues taking part in the mechanisms of innate and adaptive immune defence. The key transmitters of the signals are dendritic cells. Once pathogenic bacterium (e.g., S. pneumoniae, P. aeruginosa) has activated particular pattern recognition receptors on/in epithelial cells, the proinflammatory signaling pathways are activated. This results mainly in IL-1, IL-6 and IL-8 production. These cytokines induce the chemotaxis to the site of infection in its target cells (e.g., neutrophils, dendritic cells and macrophages). On the other hand, representatives of standard microbiota cause only weak signaling preventing the inflammation. The mechanism of distinguishing between harmless and harmful bacteria on the molecular as well as on physiological levels is not completely understood.

Nonpathogenic organisms are those that do not cause disease, harm or death to another organism. The term is usually used to describe bacteria. It describes a property of a bacterium – its inability to cause disease. Most bacteria are nonpathogenic. It can describe the presence of non-disease causing bacteria that normally reside on the surface of vertebrates and invertebrates as commensals. Some nonpathogenic microorganisms are commensals on and inside the body of animals and are called microbiota. Some of these same nonpathogenic microorganisms have the potential to cause disease, or being pathogenic, if they enter the body, multiply and cause symptoms of infection. Immunocompromised individuals are especially vulnerable to bacteria that are typically nonpathogenic; because of a compromised immune system, disease occurs when these bacteria gain access to the body's interior. Genes have been identified that predispose disease and infection with nonpathogenic bacteria by a small number of persons. Nonpathogenic Escherichia coli strains normally found in the gastrointestinal tract have the ability to stimulate the immune response in humans, though further studies are needed to determine clinical applications.

A particular strain of bacteria can be nonpathogenic in one species but pathogenic in another. One species of bacterium can have many different types or strains. One strain of a bacterium species can be nonpathogenic and another strain of the same species can be pathogenic.
