= Rob Knight (biologist) =

New Zealand computational microbiologist

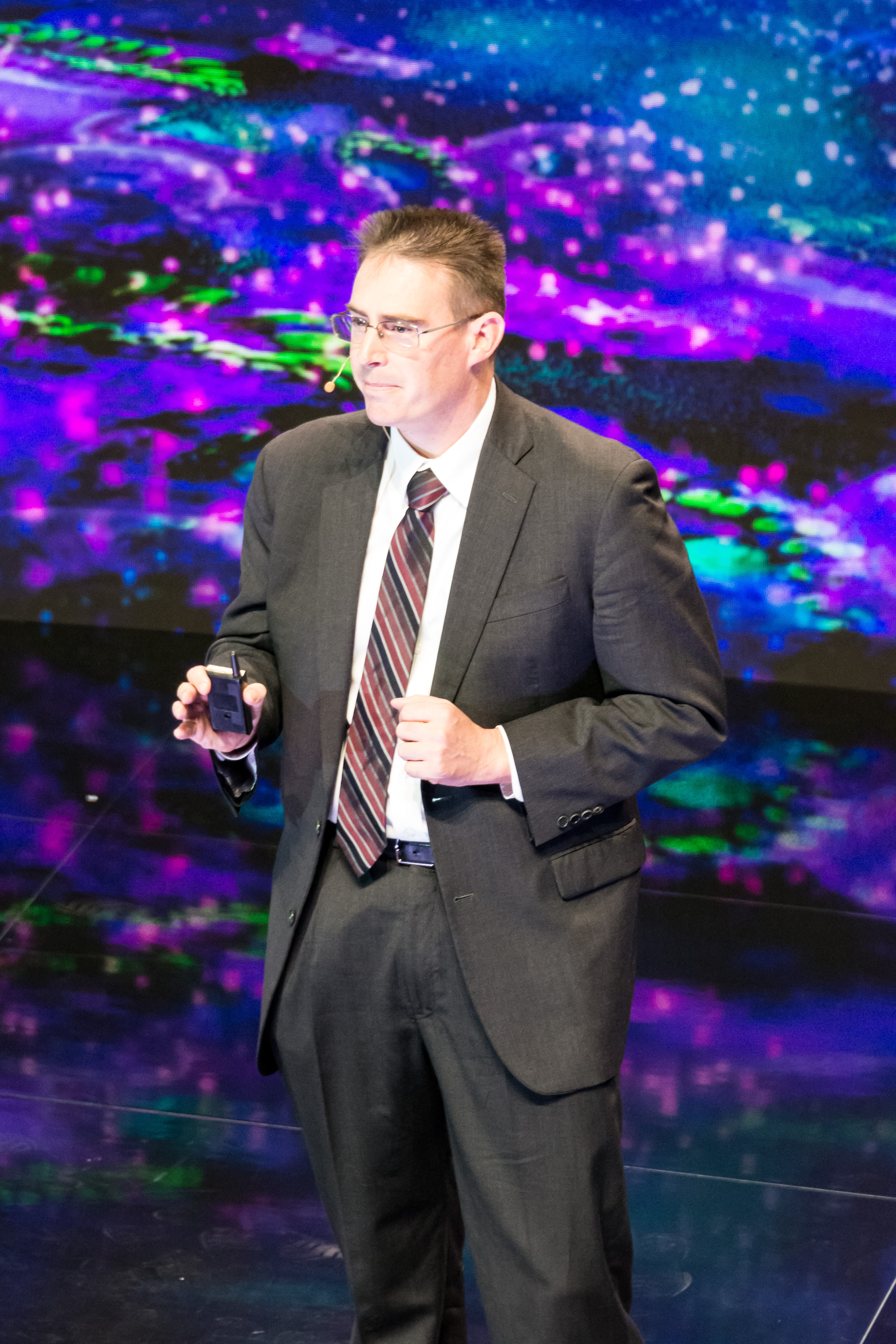
- Knight in 2020
- Born: 1976 (age 49–50); Dunedin, New Zealand

Academic work
- Discipline: Computational microbiology
- Institutions: University of California, San Diego

Rob Knight (born 1976–77) is a computational microbiologist and professor at the University of California, San Diego. His research involves the development of laboratory and computational techniques to characterize the microbiomes of humans, animals, and the environment.

Knight completed a BSc in biochemistry at the University of Otago and a PhD in Ecology and Evolutionary Biology at Princeton University in 2001, where his thesis was "The Origin and Evolution of the Genetic Code." Until 2014, he was a professor at the University of Colorado Boulder.

In 2015, he published the popular science book Follow Your Gut: The Enormous Impact of Tiny Microbes, together with science journalist Brendan Buhler.
