= Vaginal flora in pregnancy =

Microbial community of the vagina during pregnancy

The vaginal flora in pregnancy, or vaginal microbiota in pregnancy, is different from the vaginal flora (the population of microorganisms that resides in the vagina) before sexual maturity, during reproductive years, and after menopause. A description of the vaginal flora of pregnant women who are immunocompromised is not covered in this article. The composition of the vaginal flora significantly differs in pregnancy. Bacteria or viruses that are infectious most often have no symptoms.

== Microbiota in pregnancy ==
In normal pregnancy, the resident vaginal flora is thought to provide protection against infection. The microbiota during pregnancy are predominantly Lactobacillus species. Microbiota composition can change during the course of the pregnancy. If the microbiota populations become more diverse, indicating that the normal Lactobacillus-dominated population has changed to a bacterial vaginosis population, risks of adverse pregnancy outcomes increase. Vaginal discharge is common during pregnancy but is not an indicator of bacterial vaginosis or abnormal microbiota. The treatment of abnormal vaginal microbiota populations with lactobacilli and estriol during pregnancy was found to restore the microbiota to a normal state.

During pregnancy, the vaginal microbiome can contribute and play an important role in spontaneous and preterm labor. The transmission of the flora from mother to children occurs via the vagina, breast milk, and the maternal gut. After the mother has given birth to her child, the Lactobacillus-rich microbiome drops significantly, and it becomes more diverse during the postpartum period.

During pregnancy, the pH is altered due to excessive vaginal discharge, and this alters the microbiota that is present in the vagina. The bacterial species Firmicutes and Actinobacteria are identified in dysbiotic states such as this one.

== Bacterial vaginosis and pregnancy ==
Bacterial vaginosis in pregnancy is an alteration of the normal vaginal microbiota of pregnancy. Intrauterine infections in pregnancy are caused by bacteria that cause inflammation. The women may experience few or no symptoms. This sometimes leads to chorioamnionitis and other negative pregnancy outcomes. Chorioamnionitis is due to the presence of bacteria such as Ureaplasma parvum and Mycoplasma species this generates the release of proinflammatory cytokines and chemokines, IL-8 which causes cervical ripening and can result in premature birth. When there are high bacterial counts in of the vagina during pregnancy is typically due to the presence of the following organisms:

- Gardnerella vaginalis
- Fusobacterium nucleatum
- Bacteroides ureolyticus
- Atopobium vaginae
- Staphylococci species
- Streptococci species
- Mobiluncus species
- Mycoplasma species

A major portion of the vaginal microbiome also includes vaginal viral virome. According studies that have been done so far, it can be seen that there are an abundance of ds DNA viruses, ss DNA viruses and some unidentified viruses that are part of the vaginal microbiome. Only few eukaryotic viruses were detected. Out of the ones that were detected, the pathogenic viruses were Herpesvirales and Papillomaviridae.

== Racial variation in vaginal microbiomes ==
There are racial variations that are present in microbiomes between women of different races. Women who belong to Asian, White, and Caucasian race have been observed to have more anaerobic flora. The dominant member in the microbiome of these women is Lactobacillus. Women who are Hispanic and Black have anaerobic bacteria, but the dominant member of their microbiomes is not Lactobacillus. Black females are seen to have single-species dominant cluster, while Caucasian women have multiple species of Lactobacillus present in their microbiome.

Racial diversity is just of the few factors that is known to influence the variation in microbiomes in women. Other factors that also influence the variation in microbiomes are health, sexual partner, mother being a diabetic or not, and variation between monozygotic and dizygotic twins. All of different modes of delivery of microbiome from the mother to the infant, vaginal delivery can be seen to be the most favorable.

== Abnormal Vaginal Flora (AVF) ==
Vaginal microbiomes are affected and influenced by many exogenous and endogenous factors. These factors can include contraceptive agents, using antibiotics, vaginal douching, and pregnancy. Abnormal vaginal flora (AVF) is when there is an overgrowth and colonization of pathogenic microorganisms. This includes microorganisms that cause infections such as vulvo-vaginal candidiasis (VVC), bacterial vaginosis (BV), cytolytic vaginosis (CV), intermediate flora and mixed vaginitis, and trichomoniasis.

Studies shows that AVF can be one of the contributing risk factors in gynecological complications. There complications include sexually transmitted diseases and pelvic inflammatory disease. AVF has also been associated with issues such as premature rupture of membranes, preterm birth, ascending intrauterine infections, and other adverse outcomes of pregnancy.

== History ==
Investigations into reproductive-associated microbiomes began around 1885 by Theodor Escherich. He wrote that meconium from the newborn was free of bacteria. This was interpreted as the uterine environment was sterile. Other investigations used sterile diapers for meconium collection. No bacteria were able to be cultured from the samples. Bacteria were detected and were directly proportional to the time between birth and the passage of meconium.
