= Prevotella bivia =

Scientific classification
- Domain: Bacteria
- Kingdom: Pseudomonadati
- Phylum: Bacteroidota
- Class: Bacteroidia
- Order: Bacteroidales
- Family: Prevotellaceae
- Genus: Prevotella
- Species: P. bivia

Binomial name
- Prevotella bivia (Holdeman and Johnson 1977) Shah and Collins 1990

Species of bacterium

Prevotella bivia is a species of bacteria in the genus Prevotella. It is gram-negative. It is one cause of pelvic inflammatory disease.

Other Prevotella spp. are members of the oral and vaginal microbiota, and are recovered from anaerobic infections of the respiratory tract. These infections include aspiration pneumonia, lung abscess, pulmonary empyema, and chronic otitis media and sinusitis. Other species have been isolated from abscesses and burns in the vicinity of the mouth, bites, paronychia, urinary tract infection, brain abscesses, osteomyelitis, and bacteremia associated with upper respiratory tract infections. Prevotella spp. predominate in periodontal disease and periodontal abscesses. The genus also includes gut bacteria. Prevotella species dominate with high fiber, plant-based diets.

Human Prevotella spp have been compared genetically with species derived from different body sites of humans.
