= Biovar =

Variant prokaryotic strains with unusual properties

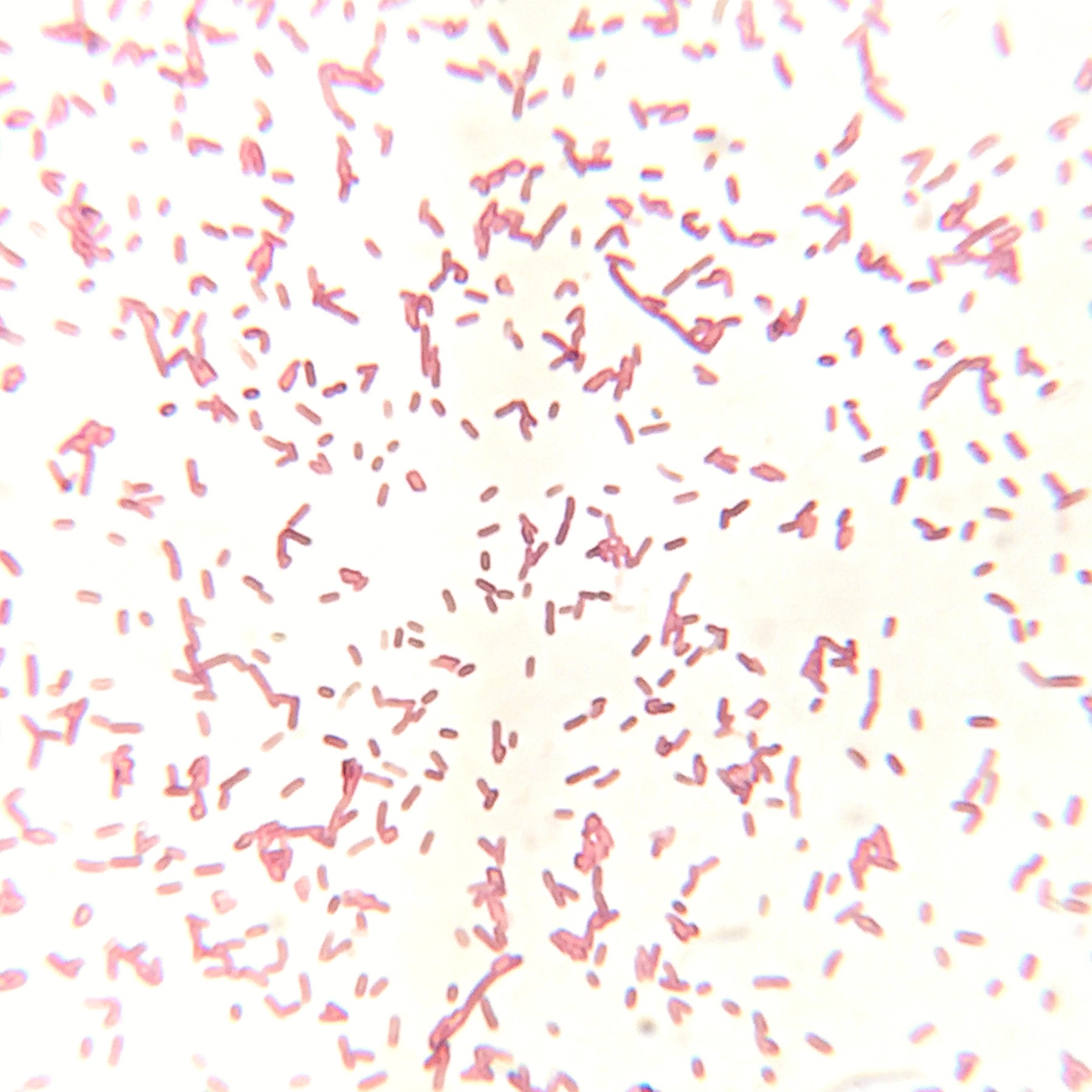
Aeromonas veronii biovar sobria Gram stain on microscope slide

A biovar is a variant prokaryotic strain that differs physiologically or biochemically from other strains in a particular species. Morphovars (or morphotypes) are those strains that differ morphologically. Serovars (or serotypes) are those strains that have antigenic properties that differ from other strains.

== List of biovars ==
This is a list of biovars and strains of biovars listed at the NCBI Taxonomy database:

- Acinetobacter calcoaceticus biovar anitratus, a homotypic synonym for Acinetobacter calcoaceticus subsp. anitratus
- Actinobacillus anseriformium biovar 1
- Actinobacillus anseriformium biovar 2
- Aeromonas veronii bv. sobria
- Aeromonas veronii bv. veronii
- Agrobacterium biovar 1, a synonym for Agrobacterium tumefaciens complex
- Agrobacterium biovar 2, a synonym for Agrobacterium rhizogenes
- Agrobacterium biovar 3, a synonym for Agrobacterium vitis
- Bacillus cereus biovar anthracis
  - Bacillus cereus biovar anthracis str. CI
- Bacillus thuringiensis biovar tenebrionis, a synonym for Bacillus thuringiensis serovar tenebrionis
- Bacillus cereus biovar toyoi, a synonym for Bacillus toyonensis
- Bacillus wiedmannii bv. thuringiensis
- Pasteurella haemolytica biovar T, synonym of Bibersteinia trehalosi
- Bifidobacterium longum bv. Suis, homotypic synonym of Bifidobacterium longum subsp. suis
- Bisgaard taxon 3 biovar 1
- Bradyrhizobium retamae bv. lupini
- Bradyrhizobium valentinum bv. lupini
- Brucella melitensis biovar Abortus, a synonym for Brucella abortus
- Brucella melitensis biovar Abortus 2308, a synonym for Brucella abortus 2308
- Brucella abortus bv. 1
  - Brucella abortus bv. 1 str. 9-941
- Brucella abortus bv. 2
- Brucella abortus bv. 3
- Brucella abortus bv. 4
- Brucella melitensis biovar Canis, a synonym for Brucella canis
- Brucella melitensis biovar Melitensis
- Brucella melitensis bv. 1
- Brucella melitensis bv. 2
- Brucella melitensis bv. 3
- Brucella melitensis biovar Neotomae, synonym for Brucella neotomae
- Brucella melitensis biovar Ovis, synonym for Brucella ovis
- Brucella melitensis biovar Suis, synonym for Brucella suis
  - Brucella melitensis biovar Suis str. 1330, synonym for Brucella suis 1330
- Brucella suis bv. 1
- Brucella suis bv. 2
- Campylobacter sputorum biovar faecalis
- Campylobacter sputorum biovar paraureolyticus
- Campylobacter sputorum biovar sputorum
- Candidatus Streptomyces philanthi bv. albopilosus
- Candidatus Streptomyces philanthi bv. barbiger
- Candidatus Streptomyces philanthi bv. basilaris
- Candidatus Streptomyces philanthi bv. bicinctus
- Candidatus Streptomyces philanthi bv. bilunatus
- Candidatus Streptomyces philanthi bv. capensis
- Candidatus Streptomyces philanthi bv. coarctatus
- Candidatus Streptomyces philanthi bv. crabroniformis
- Candidatus Streptomyces philanthi bv. crotoniphilus
- Candidatus Streptomyces philanthi bv. elongatus
- Candidatus Streptomyces philanthi bv. fuscipennis
- Candidatus Streptomyces philanthi bv. gibbosus
- Candidatus Streptomyces philanthi bv. gloriosus
- Candidatus Streptomyces philanthi bv. histrio
- Candidatus Streptomyces philanthi bv. inversus
- Candidatus Streptomyces philanthi bv. lepidus
- Candidatus Streptomyces philanthi bv. loefflingi
- Candidatus Streptomyces philanthi bv. multimaculatus
- Candidatus Streptomyces philanthi bv. pacificus
- Candidatus Streptomyces philanthi bv. parkeri
- Candidatus Streptomyces philanthi bv. politus
- Candidatus Streptomyces philanthi bv. psyche
- Candidatus Streptomyces philanthi bv. pulcher
- Candidatus Streptomyces philanthi bv. quattuordecimpunctatus
- Candidatus Streptomyces philanthi bv. rugosus
- Candidatus Streptomyces philanthi bv. tarsatus
- Candidatus Streptomyces philanthi bv. triangulum
- Candidatus Streptomyces philanthi bv. triangulum diadema
- Candidatus Streptomyces philanthi bv. ventilabris
- Candidatus Streptomyces philanthi bv. venustus
- Candidatus Streptomyces philanthi bv. zebratus
- Citrobacter sp. biovar 4280, synonym for Citrobacter rodentium
- Corynebacterium diphtheriae bv. belfanti, synonym for Corynebacterium belfantii
- Corynebacterium diphtheriae bv. intermedius
- Corynebacterium diphtheriae bv. mitis
- Corynebacterium ulcerans bv. belfanti
- Francisella tularensis Biovar A str. SCHU S4, synonym for Francisella tularensis subsp. tularensis SCHU S4
- Fusobacterium necrophorum biovar A, synonym for Fusobacterium necrophorum subsp. necrophorum
- Fusobacterium necrophorum biovar B, synonym for Fusobacterium necrophorum subsp. funduliforme
- Fusobacterium necrophorum biovar C, synonym for Fusobacterium varium
- Gallibacterium anatis biovar haemolytica
- Haemophilus influenzae biovar IV, synonym for Haemophilus quentini
- Lactobacillus helveticus biovar jugurti, synonym for Lactobacillus helveticus subsp. jugurti
- Lactococcus lactis subsp. lactis bv. diacetylactis
- Marinilabilia salmonicolor biovar Agarovorans
- Mesorhizobium ciceri biovar biserrulae
- Mesorhizobium ciceri biovar biserrulae WSM1271
- Protomonas extorquens (biovar 2), synonym for Methylorubrum rhodinum
- Protomonas extorquens (biovar 3), synonym for Methylobacterium radiotolerans
- Mycobacterium fortuitum biovar peregrinum, synonym for Mycolicibacterium peregrinum
- Neorhizobium galegae bv. officinalis
- Neorhizobium galegae bv. orientalis
- Phyllobacterium sophorae bv. mediterranense
- Bacteroides (Prevotella) ruminicola subsp. ruminicola biovar 7, synonym for Prevotella albensis
- Bacteroides (Prevotella) ruminicola subsp. ruminicola biovar 3, synonym for Prevotella bryantii
- Prochlorococcus marinus bv. HNLC1
- Prochlorococcus marinus bv. HNLC2
- Pseudomonas fluorescens biovar B
- Ralstonia pickettii biovar 3/'thomasii', synonym for Ralstonia mannitolilytica
- Rhizobium leguminosarum bv. phaseoli
- Rhizobium leguminosarum bv. trifolii
- Rhizobium leguminosarum bv. viciae also known as Rhizobium leguminosarum symbiovar viciae
- Rhizobium sp. (biovar cowpea), synonym for Rhizobium sp. IRc78
- Pasteurella pneumotropica biovar Heyl, synonym for Rodentibacter heylii
- Sinorhizobium meliloti bv. medicaginis
- Streptococcus mitis bv. 2
- Ureaplasma urealyticum biovar 1, synonym for Ureaplasma parvum
- Ureaplasma urealyticum biovar 2, synonym for Ureaplasma urealyticum
- Vibrio cholerae biovar albensis VL426, synonym for Vibrio albensis VL426
- Vibrio cholerae biovar albensis, synonym for Vibrio cholerae
- Vibrio cholerae O1 biovar El Tor
  - Vibrio cholerae O1 biovar El Tor str. Inaba RND18826
  - Vibrio cholerae O1 biovar El Tor str. Inaba RND18899
  - Vibrio cholerae O1 biovar El Tor str. L-3226
  - Vibrio cholerae O1 biovar El Tor str. N16961
  - Vibrio cholerae O1 biovar El Tor str. Ogawa RND19187
  - Vibrio cholerae O1 biovar El Tor str. Ogawa RND6878
- Yersinia pestis biovar Antiqua
  - Yersinia pestis biovar Antiqua str. B42003004
  - Yersinia pestis biovar Antiqua str. E1979001
  - Yersinia pestis biovar Antiqua str. UG05-0454
- Yersinia pestis biovar Mediaevalis
  - Yersinia pestis biovar Mediaevalis str. K1973002
  - Yersinia pestis biovar Mediaevalis str. Harbin 35
- Yersinia pestis biovar Microtus
  - Yersinia pestis biovar Microtus str. 91001
- Yersinia pestis biovar Orientalis
  - Yersinia pestis biovar Orientalis str. AS200901156
  - Yersinia pestis biovar Orientalis str. AS200901434
  - Yersinia pestis biovar Orientalis str. AS200901509
  - Yersinia pestis biovar Orientalis str. AS200901539
  - Yersinia pestis biovar Orientalis str. AS200902147
  - Yersinia pestis biovar Orientalis str. BA200901703
  - Yersinia pestis biovar Orientalis str. BA200901799
  - Yersinia pestis biovar Orientalis str. BA200901990
  - Yersinia pestis biovar Orientalis str. BA200902009
  - Yersinia pestis biovar Orientalis str. F1991016
  - Yersinia pestis biovar Orientalis str. IP275
  - Yersinia pestis biovar Orientalis str. IP674
  - Yersinia pestis biovar Orientalis str. India 195
  - Yersinia pestis biovar Orientalis str. MG05-1020
  - Yersinia pestis biovar Orientalis str. PEXU2
- Yersinia pestis subsp. microtus bv. Altaica
- Yersinia pestis subsp. microtus bv. Caucasica
- Yersinia pestis subsp. microtus bv. Hissarica
- Yersinia pestis subsp. microtus bv. Ulegeica

== See also ==
- Chemovar
- Pathovar
