= Palleniella intestinalis =

Scientific classification
- Domain: Bacteria
- Kingdom: Pseudomonadati
- Phylum: Bacteroidota
- Class: Bacteroidia
- Order: Bacteroidales
- Family: Prevotellaceae
- Genus: Palleniella
- Species: P. intestinalis

Binomial name
- Palleniella intestinalis Hitch et al 2022

Genus of bacteria

Palleniella intestinalis is a species of gram-negative bacterium in the genus Palleniella.

== Etymology ==
N.L. masc./fem. adj. intestinalis, pertaining to the intestines, from where the type strain was isolated

== Taxonomy ==
In 2022, Hitch et al. proposed the reclassification of species previously assigned to the genus Prevotella into seven genera, including four novel genera for which the names Segatella, Hoylesella, Leyella and Palleniella were proposed. In addition to the reclassification of Prevotella, this work described four novel species, Hallella faecis, Xylanibacter rodentium, Xylanibacter muris, and Palleniella intestinalis.

The type strain for the species, Nlrp6High PINT, was isolated from colon fecal contents from Nlrp6-/- mice.
