= Segatella sinensis =

Scientific classification
- Domain: Bacteria
- Phylum: Bacteroidota
- Class: Bacteroidia
- Order: Bacteroidales
- Family: Prevotellaceae
- Genus: Segatella
- Species: S. sinensis

Binomial name
- Segatella sinensis Blanco-Miguez et al. (2023)

Gram-negative bacterium

Segatella sinensis is a Gram-negative, anaerobic, non-spore-forming, non-motile bacterium. The species belongs to the genus Segatella and was previously identified as Segatella copri (also Prevotella copri) before being identified as a distinct species in 2023.

The Segatella genus dominates in individuals living in non-Westernized populations. S. copri and S. sinensis frequently co-occur: both species are present in 13% of Westernized, and 79% of non-Westernized populations.

S. sinensis, specifically, is also associated with the male sex.

== Phylogeny ==
S. sinensis was first identified as a distinct species in 2023, when the genetic diversity of Segatella copri was further investigated through the isolation of 44 distinct strains. Seven distinct Segatella copri-related species were defined: S. sinensis, S. copri, S. brunsvicensis, S. brasiliensis, S. hominis, S. sanihominis, and S. sinica.

=== Locus of enterocyte effacement ===
S. sinensis contains the locus of enterocyte effacement (LEE): a pathogenicity island which encodes a secretion system proteins responsible for attaching to and damaging the intestinal lining. LEE was absent in the other Segatella copri-derived species and can therefore be seen as a unique identifier.

== Pathology ==
An overabundance of Segatella species has been linked to diseases such as rheumatoid arthritis in Westernized populations. Other studies, however, have failed to establish the same association. Some studies even linked Segatella species to an improved metabolic health. The exact effect of Segatella species on human health has therefore yet to be clarified.

The presence of S. sinensis has been associated with a 60% reduced chance of visceral fat and is negatively associated with the number of triglycerides and lipoprotein density. The bacterium has also been positively associated with healthy diet scores.
