= Prevotella marseillensis =

Scientific classification
- Domain: Bacteria
- Kingdom: Pseudomonadati
- Phylum: Bacteroidota
- Class: Bacteroidia
- Order: Bacteroidales
- Family: Prevotellaceae
- Genus: Prevotella
- Species: P. marseillensis

Binomial name
- Prevotella marseillensis Kuete Yimagou et al. 2026

Species of bacterium

Prevotella marseillensis is a species of anaerobic, non-motile, non-spore-forming, Gram-negative coccobacillus in the family Prevotellaceae. The bacterium is found in the human microbiome and is named after the city of Marseille, where the strain was first isolated from the stool of a patient with recurrent Clostridium difficile infection.

Standard cultivation of P. marseillensis occurs on columbia agar with 5% sheep blood in anaerobic conditions at 37°C and pH 7.5. The bacterium's growth temperature ranges from 25-45°C and its optimum growth temperature is 37°C.

== Structure ==
The cells of P. marseillensis are rod-shaped and show oxidase- and catalase-negative activities. The bacterium's colonies are coccobacilli with an average diameter of 2.81μm.
