= Prevotella melaninogenica =

Scientific classification
- Domain: Bacteria
- Kingdom: Pseudomonadati
- Phylum: Bacteroidota
- Class: Bacteroidia
- Order: Bacteroidales
- Family: Prevotellaceae
- Genus: Prevotella
- Species: P. melaninogenica

Binomial name
- Prevotella melaninogenica (Oliver and Wherry 1921) Shah and Collins 1990

Synonyms
- Bacteroides melaninogenicus

Species of bacterium

Prevotella melaninogenica is a species of bacterium in the normal microbiota of the upper respiratory tract. It is an important human pathogen in various anaerobic infections, often mixed with other aerobic and anaerobic bacteria. P. melaninogenica is an anaerobic, Gram-negative rod, named for its black colonies, and black pigment.

Prevotella melaninogenica is associated with hypertension together with Campylobacter rectus and Veillonella parvula.

== Description ==
Prevotella melaninogenica are Gram-negative rod-shaped bacteria. They are obligate anaerobes and cannot survive in the presence of oxygen. They are not motile, and do not form spores. P. melaninogenica grow well on blood agar, where they form circular dark-colored colonies that darken over one to two weeks.

== History ==
Prevotella melaninogenica was originally described as Bacteroides melaninogenicus in 1921 by Wade Oliver and William Wherry at the University of Cincinnati as a new bacterium isolated from various sites of several different human patients. In 1982, Lillian Holdeman and John Johnson determined that some bacteria previously described as B. melaninogenicus were actually a distinct species, which they named Bacteroides loescheii (later renamed Prevotella loescheii). In 1990, Haroun Shah and David Collins at the London Hospital Medical College reclassified several species of Bacteroides, including B. melanogenicus under a new genus called Prevotella. With this, B. melaninogenicus was renamed to Prevotella melaninogenica.
