= Prevotella oralis =

Scientific classification
- Domain: Bacteria
- Kingdom: Pseudomonadati
- Phylum: Bacteroidota
- Class: Bacteroidia
- Order: Bacteroidales
- Family: Prevotellaceae
- Genus: Prevotella
- Species: P. oralis

Binomial name
- Prevotella oralis Shah et al., 1990

Species of bacterium

Prevotella oralis is a species of anaerobic, gram-negative bacteria. P. oralis is a commensal of the oropharynx and vagina. The species is one of the predominant bacteria in the oral cavity. P. oralis can gain access to the gastrointestinal tract, where it can interfere with intestinal bacteria.

P. oralis was formally described in 1990.
