= Alloprevotella rava =

Scientific classification
- Domain: Bacteria
- Kingdom: Pseudomonadati
- Phylum: Bacteroidota
- Class: Bacteroidia
- Order: Bacteroidales
- Family: Prevotellaceae
- Genus: Alloprevotella
- Species: A. rava

Binomial name
- Alloprevotella rava Downes et al. 2013

Bacterium

Alloprevotella rava is a Gram-negative and anaerobic bacterium from the genus of Alloprevotella which has been isolated from the human oral cavity.

Saliva samples of suicidal students are positively correlated with lower Alloprevotella rava levels.
