= Palleniella =

Scientific classification
- Domain: Bacteria
- Kingdom: Pseudomonadati
- Phylum: Bacteroidota
- Class: Bacteroidia
- Order: Bacteroidales
- Family: Prevotellaceae
- Genus: Palleniella; Hitch et al 2022

Species
- Palleniella intestinalis

Genus of bacteria

Palleniella is a genus in the phylum Bacteroidota (Bacteria).

== Etymology ==
The genus is named after the British microbiologist Mark Pallen who pioneered the automation of name creation for microorganisms.

== Species ==
The genus contains the following species:

- Palleniella intestinalis (Hitch et al 2022)

== Taxonomy ==
In 2022, Hitch et al. proposed the reclassification of species previously assigned to the genus Prevotella into seven genera, including four novel genera for which the names Segatella, Hoylesella, Leyella and Palleniella were proposed. In addition to the reclassification of Prevotella, this work described four novel species, Hallella faecis, Xylanibacter rodentium, Xylanibacter muris, and Palleniella intestinalis.

== See also ==
- Bacterial taxonomy
- Microbiology
