= Prevotella nigrescens =

Scientific classification
- Domain: Bacteria
- Kingdom: Pseudomonadati
- Phylum: Bacteroidota
- Class: Bacteroidia
- Order: Bacteroidales
- Family: Prevotellaceae
- Genus: Prevotella
- Species: P. nigrescens

Binomial name
- Prevotella nigrescens Shah & Gharbia, 1992

Species of bacterium

Prevotella nigrescens is a species of bacterium. Prevotella nigrescens has a gram negative gram stain. When P. nigrescens microflora colonize they trigger an over-aggressive response from the immune system and increase the incidence of many diseases and infections. One specific type of bacteria that is part of the normal oral flora but leads to disease when it infects the local tissue. This bacteria has no means of motility and has a Bacilli (rod) shape. Prevotella species are part of the human oral and vaginal flora. They play a role in the pathogenesis of periodontal disease, gingivitis, and extraoral infections such as nasopharyngeal and intra-abdominal infections also some odontogenic infections, and strains are usually carried in families, in so-called intrafamilial carriage. It is also associated with carotid atherosclerosis.
