= Alloprevotella tannerae =

Scientific classification
- Domain: Bacteria
- Kingdom: Pseudomonadati
- Phylum: Bacteroidota
- Class: Bacteroidia
- Order: Bacteroidales
- Family: Prevotellaceae
- Genus: Alloprevotella
- Species: A. tannerae

Binomial name
- Alloprevotella tannerae (Moore et al. 1994) Downes et al. 2013

Synonyms
- Prevotella tannerae

Gram-negative bacterium

Alloprevotella tannerae is a Gram-negative, obligately anaerobic, non-spore-forming, rod-shaped and non-motile bacterium from the genus of Alloprevotella which has been isolated from a human gingival crevice.
