= Prevotella copri =

Scientific classification
- Domain: Bacteria
- Kingdom: Pseudomonadati
- Phylum: Bacteroidota
- Class: Bacteroidia
- Order: Bacteroidales
- Family: Prevotellaceae
- Genus: Prevotella
- Species: P. copri

Binomial name
- Prevotella copri Hayashi et al. 2007

Synonyms
- Segatella copri

Species of bacterium

Prevotella copri, also Segatella copri, is an anaerobe, Gram-negative, rod-shaped bacterium. The species is a prominent bacterium of the human oral and intestinal microbiota of non-Westernized populations and was first isolated from human faeces in 2007 by Hayashi et al.

P. copri has been associated with both beneficial and detrimental effects on human health and has therefore been the subject of intense research, which focusses on identifying which microbial features define beneficial and pathogenic host interactions. P. copri is prevalent in people with plant-rich diets and is thus associated with a healthy lifestyle. It has been suggested that the bacterium might regulate host immune responses via lectin-glycan interactions.

P. copri is capable of producing bioactive amines, including phenylethylamine, tyramine, tryptamine, and ornithine.

== Structure ==
P. copri cells are anaerobic and non-spore forming. Their optimum growth temperature is 37°C. The bacterium's most significant metabolic end products are succinic and acetic acids.

The species has an incubation period of 2-3 days and it can grow and thrive using pectin as a carbon source. P. copri is associated with a fiber-rich diet and cannot grow on starch and animal glycans; it is unable to utilize predominant meat and starch polysaccharides.

== Pathology ==
Decreased abundance of P. copri has also been linked to Western diets and conditions like Parkinson's disease. Increased P. copri abundance, on the other hand, has been linked to systemic inflammatory pathologies/diseases, like type 2 diabetes, non-alcoholic fatty liver disease, obesity, and rheumatoid arthritis (RA). Newly diagnosed RA patients have microbiota with an increased abundance of P. copri and an increased immune response (systemic antibodies and T-cell responses) against P. copri antigens.
