= Paraprevotella =

Scientific classification
- Domain: Bacteria
- Kingdom: Pseudomonadati
- Phylum: Bacteroidota
- Class: Bacteroidia
- Order: Bacteroidales
- Family: Prevotellaceae
- Genus: Paraprevotella; Morotomi et al. 2009

Species
- P. clara P. xylaniphila

Bacterium

Paraprevotella is a Gram-negative, non-spore-forming, pleomorphic and anaerobic genus of bacteria from the family of Prevotellaceae. Paraprevotella clara and Paraprevotella xylaniphila have been isolated from human faeces.
