= Brain abscess =

Accumulation of pus within the brain

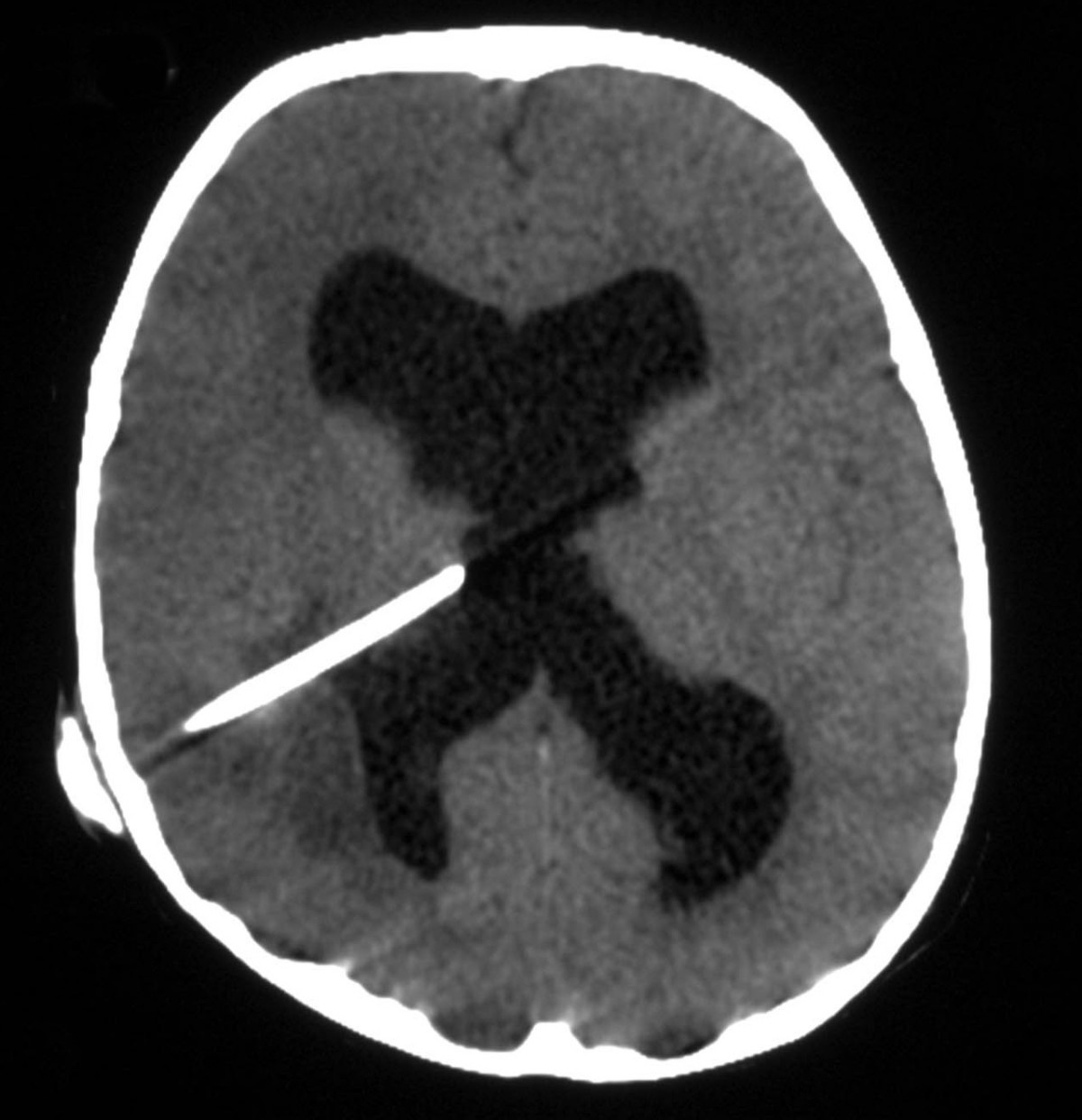
- Brain abscess in a person with a CSF shunt. The abscess is the darker gray region in the lower left of the image (corresponding to the right parietal lobe). The lateral ventricles are visible in black in the center of the brain, adjacent to the abscess.
- Specialty: Neurology, infectious diseases

Brain abscess (or cerebral abscess) is an abscess within the brain tissue caused by inflammation and collection of infected material coming from local (ear infection, dental abscess, infection of paranasal sinuses, infection of the mastoid air cells of the temporal bone, epidural abscess) or remote (lung, heart, kidney etc.) infectious sources. The infection may also be introduced through a skull fracture following a head trauma or surgical procedures. Brain abscess is usually associated with congenital heart disease in young children. It may occur at any age but is most frequent in the third decade of life.

== Signs and symptoms ==
Fever, headache, and neurological problems, while classic, only occur in 20% of people with brain abscess.

Fever, headache, and focal neurologic findings is highly suggestive of a brain abscess. These symptoms are caused by a combination of increased intracranial pressure due to a space-occupying lesion (headache, vomiting, confusion, coma), infection (fever, fatigue etc.) and focal neurologic brain tissue damage (hemiparesis, aphasia etc.).

The most frequent presenting symptoms are headache, drowsiness, confusion, seizures, hemiparesis or speech difficulties together with fever with a rapidly progressive course. Headache is characteristically worse at night and in the morning, as the intracranial pressure naturally increases when in the supine position. This elevation similarly stimulates the medullary vomiting center and area postrema, leading to morning vomiting.

Other symptoms and findings depend largely on the specific location of the abscess in the brain. An abscess in the cerebellum, for instance, may cause additional complaints as a result of brain stem compression and hydrocephalus. Neurological examination may reveal a stiff neck in occasional cases (erroneously suggesting meningitis).

== Pathophysiology ==
=== Bacterial ===
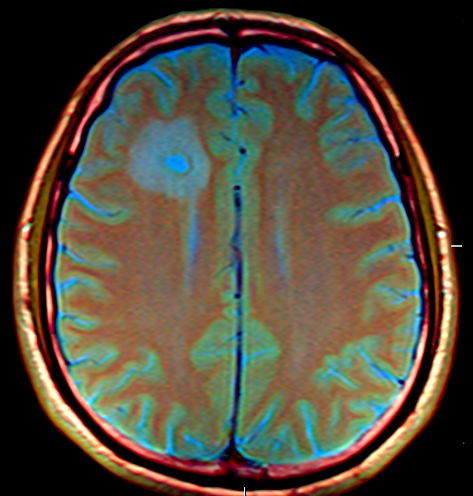
Brain abscess after metastasis treatment

Anaerobic and microaerophilic cocci and gram-negative and gram-positive anaerobic bacilli are the predominant bacterial isolates. Many brain abscesses are polymicrobial. The predominant organisms include: Staphylococcus aureus, aerobic and anaerobic streptococci (especially Streptococcus intermedius), Bacteroides, Prevotella, and Fusobacterium species, Enterobacteriaceae, Pseudomonas species, and other anaerobes. Less common organisms include: Haemophillus influenzae, Streptococcus pneumoniae and Neisseria meningitidis.

Bacterial abscesses rarely (if ever) arise de novo within the brain, although establishing a cause can be difficult in many cases. There is almost always a primary lesion elsewhere in the body that must be sought assiduously because failure to treat the primary lesion will result in relapse. In cases of trauma, for example, in compound skull fractures where fragments of bone are pushed into the substance of the brain, the cause of the abscess is obvious. Similarly, bullets and other foreign bodies may become sources of infection if left in place. The location of the abscess may suggest the location of the primary lesion: infections of the middle ear result in lesions in the middle and posterior cranial fossae; congenital heart disease with right-to-left shunts often result in abscesses in the distribution of the middle cerebral artery; and infection of the frontal and ethmoid sinuses usually results in collection in the subdural sinuses.

=== Other organisms ===
Fungi and parasites may also cause the disease. Fungi and parasites are especially associated with immunocompromised patients. Other causes include: Nocardia asteroides, Mycobacterium, Fungi (e.g. Aspergillus, Candida, Cryptococcus, Mucorales, Coccidioides, Histoplasma capsulatum, Blastomyces dermatitidis, Bipolaris, Exophiala dermatitidis, Curvularia pallescens, Ochroconis gallopava, Ramichloridium mackenziei, Pseudallescheria boydii), Protozoa (e.g. Toxoplasma gondii, Entamoeba histolytica, Trypanosoma cruzi, Schistosoma, Paragonimus), and Helminths (e.g. Taenia solium). Organisms that are most frequently associated with brain abscess in patients with AIDS are poliovirus, Toxoplasma gondii, and Cryptococcus neoformans, though in infection with the latter organism, symptoms of meningitis generally predominate.

These organisms are associated with certain predisposing conditions:

- Sinus and dental infections – Aerobic and anaerobic streptococci, anaerobic gram-negative bacilli (e.g. Prevotella, Porphyromonas, Bacteroides), Fusobacterium, S. aureus, and Enterobacteriaceae
- Penetrating trauma – S. aureus, aerobic streptococci, Enterobacteriaceae, and Clostridium spp.
- Pulmonary infections – Aerobic and anaerobic streptococci, anaerobic gram-negative bacilli (e.g. Prevotella, Porphyromonas, Bacteroides), Fusobacterium, Actinomyces, and Nocardia
- Congenital heart disease – Aerobic and microaerophilic streptococci, and S. aureus
- HIV infection – T. gondii, Mycobacterium, Nocardia, Cryptococcus, and Listeria monocytogenes
- Transplantation – Aspergillus, Candida, Cryptococcus, Mucorales, Nocardia, and T. gondii
- Neutropenia – Aerobic gram-negative bacilli, Aspergillus, Candida, and Mucorales

== Diagnosis ==
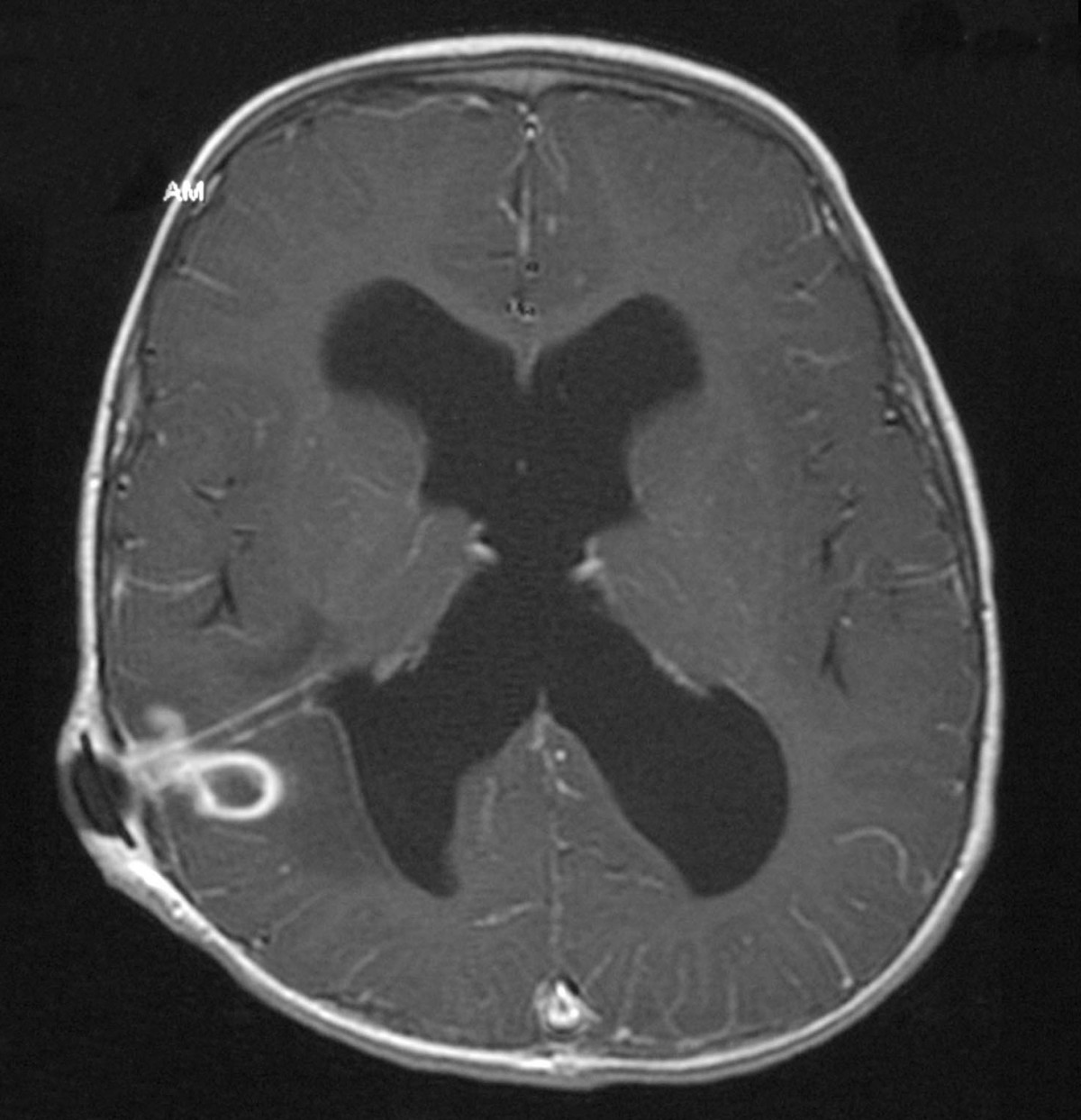
MRI (T1 with contrast) showing the ring-enhancing lesion. From a rare case report of an abscess formed as a complication of the CSF shunt. Jamjoom et al., 2009.

The diagnosis is established by a computed tomography (CT) (with contrast) examination. At the initial phase of the inflammation (referred to as cerebritis), the immature lesion does not have a capsule, and it may be difficult to distinguish it from other space-occupying lesions or infarcts of the brain. Within 4–5 days, the inflammation and the concomitant dead brain tissue are surrounded by a capsule, which gives the lesion the famous ring-enhancing lesion appearance on CT examination with contrast (since intravenously applied contrast material can not pass through the capsule, it is collected around the lesion and looks like a ring surrounding the relatively dark lesion). Lumbar puncture procedure, which is performed in many infectious disorders of the central nervous system is contraindicated in this condition (as it is in all space-occupying lesions of the brain) because removing a certain portion of the cerebrospinal fluid may alter the concrete intracranial pressure balances and causes the brain tissue to move across structures within the skull (brain herniation).

Ring enhancement may also be observed in cerebral hemorrhages (bleeding) and some brain tumors. However, in the presence of the rapidly progressive course with fever, focal neurologic findings (hemiparesis, aphasia, etc.), and signs of increased intracranial pressure, the most likely diagnosis should be the brain abscess.

== Treatment ==
The treatment includes lowering the increased intracranial pressure and starting intravenous antibiotics (and meanwhile identifying the causative organism mainly by blood culture studies).

Hyperbaric oxygen therapy (HBO2 or HBOT) is indicated as primary and adjunct treatment, which provides four primary functions. Firstly, HBOT reduces intracranial pressure. Secondly, high partial pressures of oxygen act as a bactericide and thus inhibit the anaerobic and functionally anaerobic flora common in brain abscess. Third, HBOT optimizes the immune function, thus enhancing the host defense mechanisms, and fourth, HBOT is beneficial when a brain abscess is concomitant with cranial osteomyelitis.

Secondary functions of HBOT include increased stem cell production and up-regulation of VEGF, which aid in the healing and recovery process.

Surgical drainage of the abscess remains part of the standard management of bacterial brain abscesses. The location and treatment of the primary lesion are also crucial, as is the removal of any foreign material (bone, dirt, bullets, and so forth).

There are a few exceptions to this rule: Haemophilus influenzae meningitis is often associated with subdural effusions that are mistaken for subdural empyemas. These effusions resolve with antibiotics and require no surgical treatment. Tuberculosis can produce brain abscesses that look identical to conventional bacterial abscesses on CT imaging. Surgical drainage or aspiration is often necessary to identify Mycobacterium tuberculosis, but once the diagnosis is made, no further surgical intervention is necessary.

CT-guided stereotactic aspiration is also indicated in the treatment of brain abscess. The use of pre-operative imaging, intervention with post-operative clinical and biochemical monitoring used to manage brain abscesses today dates back to the Pennybacker system pioneered by Somerset, Kentucky-born neurosurgeon Joseph Buford Pennybacker, director of the neurosurgery department of the Radcliffe Infirmary, Oxford from 1952 to 1971.

== Prognosis ==
While death occurs in about 10% of cases, people do well about 70% of the time. This is a large improvement from the 1960s due to improved ability to image the head, more effective neurosurgery, and more effective antibiotics.
