= Alloprevotella =

Scientific classification
- Domain: Bacteria
- Kingdom: Pseudomonadati
- Phylum: Bacteroidota
- Class: Bacteroidia
- Order: Bacteroidales
- Family: Prevotellaceae
- Genus: Alloprevotella; Downes et al. 2013

Species
- A. rava A. tannerae

Bacterium

Alloprevotella is a genus of gram-negative bacteria from the family of Prevotellaceae.
