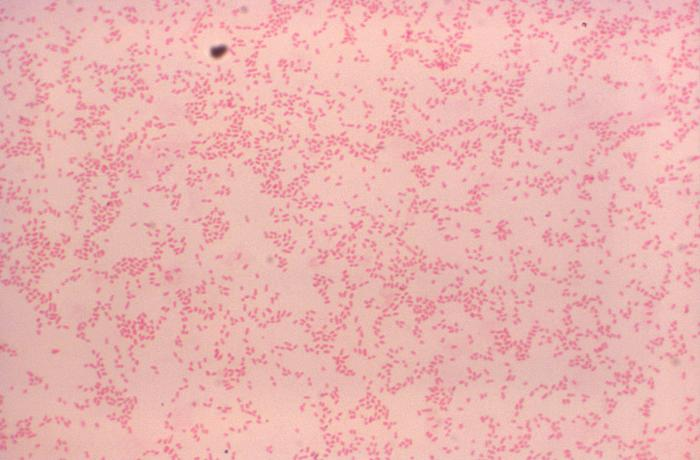
- Gram-stained photomicrograph depicting numerous gram-negative Brucella canis bacteria

Scientific classification
- Domain: Bacteria
- Kingdom: Pseudomonadati
- Phylum: Pseudomonadota
- Class: Alphaproteobacteria
- Order: Hyphomicrobiales
- Family: Brucellaceae
- Genus: Brucella
- Species: B. canis

Binomial name
- Brucella canis Carmichael & Bruner, 1968

= Brucella canis =

Species of bacterium

Brucella canis is a Gram-negative bacterium in the family Brucellaceae that causes brucellosis in dogs, other canids, and in rare cases, humans. It is a non-motile short-rod or coccus-shaped organism, and is oxidase, catalase, and urease positive. B. canis causes infertility in both male and female dogs. It can also cause inflammation in the eyes. The hosts of B. canis range from domestic animals to foxes and coyotes. It is a zoonotic organism, meaning it can be transmitted from animals to humans. It is passed from species to species via bodily fluids such as genital secretions and urine. Treatments such as spaying, neutering, and long-term antibiotics have been used to combat B. canis in dogs. The species was first described in the United States in 1966 where mass abortions of beagles were documented. Brucella canis can be found in both pets and wild animals and causes a lifelong infection in affected animals. B. canis has two distinct circular chromosomes that can attribute to horizontal gene transfer.

== Morphology ==
Brucella canis are non-motile organisms and cannot move independently due to the absence of flagella. Brucella are also non-encapsulated, non-spore forming bacteria that replicate in the ER of their host cells. The bacteria are Gram-negative coccobacilli or short rods measuring 0.6 to 1.5 μm long, and 0.5 to 0.7 μm wide, do not have a capsule, do not form spores, and are aerobic.

On blood or chocolate agar, colonies are small (~0.5-2 mm after 48-72 hours), convex, non-hemolytic and non-pigmented. Often B. canis colonies can present themselves as rough variants, a reflection of their naturally rough lipopolysaccharide (LPS) phenotype. The optimal growth temperature for B. canis is 37°C, but growth is still possible within the range from 20°C to 40°C. Additionally, the pH range in which B. canis grows most effectively is from pH 6.6-7.4, making this organism neutrophilic in nature.

Brucella species, specifically B. canis, possess a highly specialized outer cell envelope characterized by an atypical profile of membrane lipids. Their outer membrane contains very-long-chain fatty acids (VLCFAs) and modified lipid A structures that differ markedly from traditional Gram-negative bacteria. Importantly, B. canis is a "natural rough" Brucella. Its Lipopolysaccharide lacks the O-polysaccharide that is present in smooth strains; an envelope trait that influences colony phenotype and host interaction without implying a-virulence.

B. canis is also unique from other Brucella species in that they demonstrate a distinctive phospholipid arrangement that differ greatly from other Gram-negative bacteria. Their envelope incorporates uncommon lipid species such as altered phosphatidylethanolamine and lipid A derivatives enriched with long-chain and branched fatty acids; features that reflect evolutionary adaptation to an intracellular lifecycle. Additionally, its phospholipid portion is mainly composed of cis-vaccenic cyclopropane with small amounts of lactobaccilic acid. This differs from other Brucella species, as they demonstrate the opposite composition, with lactobacillic acid making up the majority of the phospholipid fraction. Brucella is unusual in this composition because lactobacillic acid is typically within Gram-positive organisms but not common within Gram-negative organisms such as Brucella. These specific envelope features are discussed alongside the organisms hallmark intracellular cycle. After uptake, Brucella replicate within ER-derived Brucella containing vacuoles, a niche specific to replication and survival within B. canis.

=== Identification ===
B. canis is a zoonotic organism. The bacteria are oxidase, catalase and urease positive and non-motile. Unlike haemophilus, which they resemble, they have no requirements for added X (hemin) and V (nicotinamide adenine dinucleotide) factors in cultures. Full identification is established by serology and PCR. Due to B. canis being naturally rough (lacking O-polysaccharide), smooth-antigen serology is unreliable. Modern practice uses B. canis-adapated serological assays such as RSAT/2-ME, IFAT (Immunofluorescence Antibody test) and ELISA to make full identification. B. canis is not acid-fast, but they tend to maintain their color when exposed to weak acids. This results in their red color when stained. When isolated, B. canis is always in a rough form, with hydrophobic LPS imbedded in its outer membrane. MALDI-TOF mass spectrometry with validated databases and whole-genome sequencing (WGS) are now increasingly used for definitive confirmation of B. canis and specific outbreak tracing.

Colonies of Brucella can typically start to be seen after 48 hours. These colonies tend to be 0.5-1.0 mm in diameter, with a convex shape and are typically circular. Growth is often slower than other bacteria, with colonies requiring up to 72 hours for clear visualization. B. canis presents itself as a rough species, so colonies are generally non-mucoid rather than sticky, glue-like of presenting smooth strains. Their colonies are small, white to yellowish white and non-pigmented, consistent with rough Brucella.

=== Metabolism ===
B. canis functions as a chemoorganotroph, deriving energy from the oxidation of organic compounds and utilizing organic electron sources. Studies indicate that B. canis, like other Brucella species, shares a conserved metabolic architecture within the genus. This includes a lack of phosphofructokinase (PFK), an enzyme required for the Embden–Meyerhof–Parnas (EMP) pathway (classical glycolysis). Instead, glucose catabolism is accomplished using the pentose phosphate pathway. While select Brucella species can also rely on a functional Entner–Doudoroff pathway, this pathway is not functional in most Brucella species, including B. canis, due to inactivating mutations. B. canis also possesses a complete tricarboxylic acid (TCA) cycle, which primarily utilizes oxygen as its terminal electron acceptor within its electron transport chain. In anaerobic conditions, nitrate can also function as a terminal electron acceptor because B. canis is capable of producing nitrate reductase.

B. canis also exhibits strong urease activity, producing the enzyme urease to hydrolyze urea into ammonia and carbon dioxide. This enzymatic activity is relevant for its role in nitrogen acquisition and as a notable virulence factor, as it helps to neutralize and facilitate survival within surrounding acidic environments.

For laboratory identification, a relevant metabolic characteristic of B. canis is that it does not require supplemental CO_{2} for growth, unlike some other Brucella species. Additionally, B. canis has demonstrated growth on media containing thionine, but no growth on media containing basic fuchsin.

=== Genome ===
B. canis has two distinct circular chromosomes, a structure conserved across the Brucella genus. For the reference strain ATCC 23365, Chromosome 1 has 2,199 genes, and Chromosome 2 has 1,224 genes. These two circular chromosomes contain multiple distinct shared regions, which can be attributed to horizontal gene transfer. Evidence suggests that Chromosome 2 was derived from a plasmid, though both chromosomes contain essential genes.

B. canis and B. suis in particular share extremely similar genomic content, exceeding what would traditionally be expected from similarities between different species in the same genus. Genomic analysis suggests that B. canis is part of the B. suis clade, and represents a host-adapted variant of B. suis. Despite this significant similarity, it is still possible to differentiate between B. canis and B. suis using PCR assays targeting specific known genetic variations. The most notable distinguishing factor is the lack of O-polysaccharide in its lipopolysaccharide, causing the naturally "rough" phenotype for B. canis in contrast to B. suis which retains the naturally "smooth" phenotype.

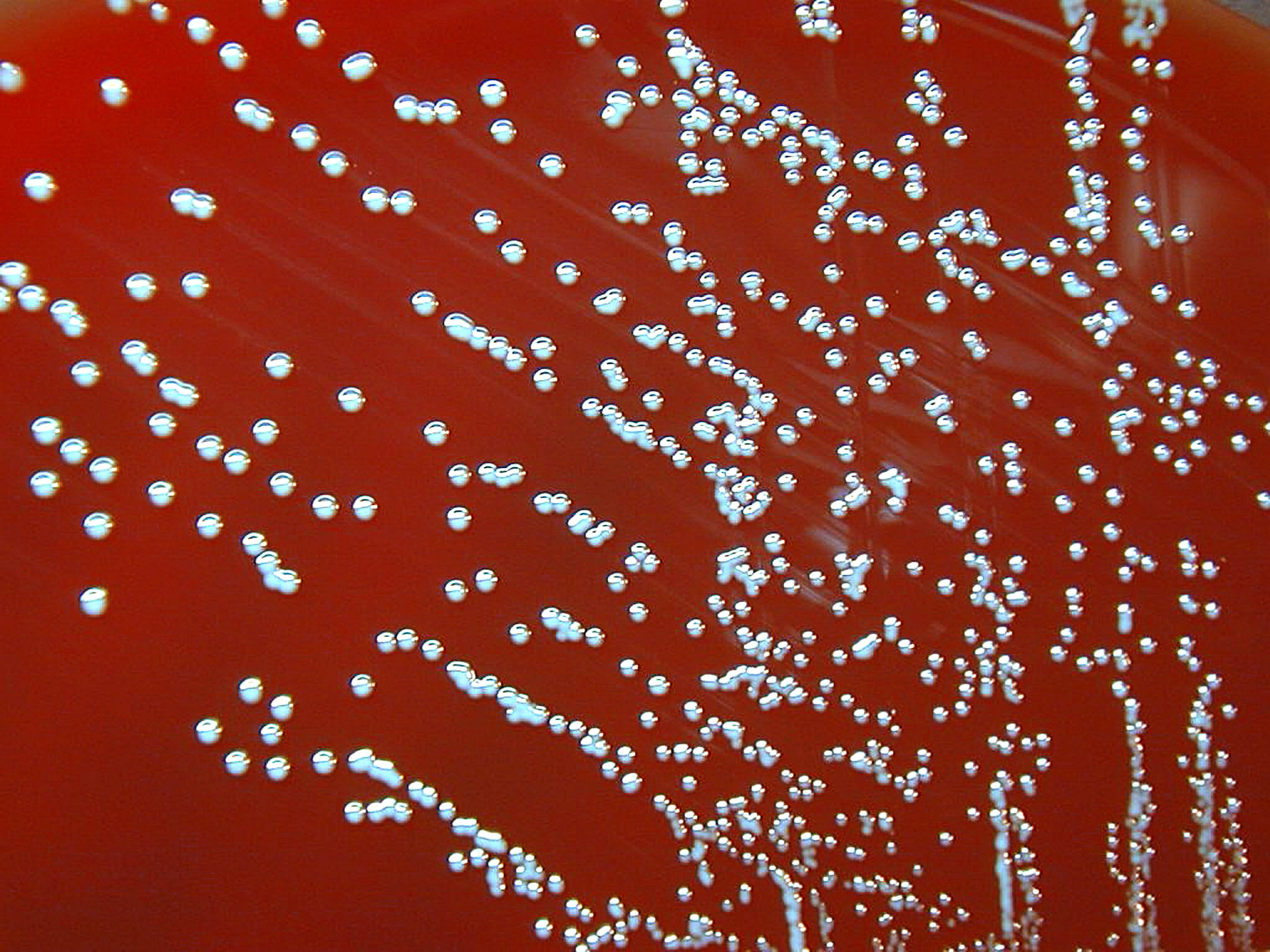
Image of B. canis colonies growing on blood agar culture media.

== Pathogenicity ==
The disease is characterized by epididymitis and orchitis in male dogs, endometritis, placentitis, and abortions in females, and often presents as infertility in both sexes. Other symptoms such as inflammation in the eyes and axial and appendicular skeleton; lymphadenopathy and splenomegaly, are less common. Although there has been an increase in the international movement of dogs, Brucella canis is still very uncommon. Signs of this disease are different in both genders of dogs; females that have B. canis infections face an abortion of their developed fetuses. Males face the chance of infertility, because they develop an antibody against their spermatozoa. This may be followed by inflammation of the testes which generally settles down a while after. Another symptom is the infection of the spinal plates or vertebrae, which is called diskospondylitis. It is generally spotted in the animal's reproductive organs. This infection usually causes the animal to spontaneously abort a fetus and can also cause an animal to become sterile.

=== Host range ===
The host range of the bacterium is mainly domestic dogs but evidence of infections in foxes and coyotes has been reported. B. canis is a zoonotic organism and although rare, humans can contract the infection. It is unlikely, but most common in dog breeders, those in laboratories dealing with the bacteria, or people who are immunocompromised.

=== Transmission ===
B. canis is commonly transmitted during sexual intercourse, as well as physical contact with infected bodily fluids. B. canis is passed through contact with fluids from the mucous membranes of the genitals (semen and vaginal discharge), eyes, and oronasal cavities. The highest bacterial loads of B. canis are found in the genital secretions of dogs infected with the bacteria. Contact can occur during sexual activity as well as other daily grooming and social interactions. Though dog-to-dog transmission is most commonly during breeding, it can also happen after contact with uterine discharge, semen, and aborted material.

High levels of B. canis exist in these secretions in the six weeks following abortion in females, and around six to eight weeks following infection in males. Lower levels of B. canis still remain in the semen of infected males for two years following infection, which can serve as a large source of transmission to other dogs. Offspring of infected females can be infected with B. canis through intrauterine vertical transmission or via drinking the milk of the infected female.

Urine can also serve as a route of transmission in males, as the bladder resides in close proximity to the prostate and epididymus. The bacterial load in the urine of infected dogs is lower than in genital discharges. In their urine, infected dogs can carry up to 10^{6} bacteria per milliliter, compared to the genital discharges that can carry up to 10^{10} bacteria per milliliter. This leads to contamination of the urine making it another vehicle for B. canis transmission. Infected dogs carry the highest bacterial load of B. canis after 1-6 months after infection. Infected neutered animals are not able to display reproductive symptoms, however both intact and neutered dogs are able to shed B. canis in urine. This means that both neutered and intact dogs are able to transmit the disease via urine. B. canis is found to be localized in the prostate of male dogs, thus transmitting through the urine in both intact and neutered males. It has been suggested that male dogs carry higher concentrations of the bacteria when compared to female dogs due contamination from seminal fluid. Neutered dogs are also capable of shedding the bacteria in their saliva and nasal secretions.

B. canis is the least common cause of Brucellosis in humans. Transmission to humans is rarely diagnosed but is possible. It can be transmitted via bodily fluids and aborted material. Signs and symptoms are very non-specific, such as fever, joint pain, and fatigue. The disease can also be debilitating, causing conditions such as endocarditis, splenomegaly, or neurologic symptoms.

=== Diagnosis and treatment ===
In current practice for dogs, B. canis is diagnosed using PCR, cultures, and serologic testing. The most standard test for B. canis is culture. These cultures are typically conducted on the host's blood, vaginal discharge, or semen. However, this method is not effective if the dog has been treated with antimicrobial drugs, as this will clear B. canis bacteria even if the disease has not resolved. Serology is used to evaluate the antibody response against Brucella spp. cell wall antigens, the downfall of this method is its lack of specificity. PCR testing has shown potential as a rapid test, however it is not readily available and is currently considered an experimental test.

Currently, there are no commercially available vaccines for B. canis. Antimicrobial treatment and sterilization of the infected animals is considered an alternative to removing the animal. There have been reports of anti-Brucella vaccines (used for cattle and small ruminants), used along with previously mentioned methods but is not considered practical due to its risk of vaccine strain shedding in a domestic environment with current vaccines maintaining an amount of virulence for humans.

Treatment for B. canis is very difficult to find and often very expensive. This is due to B. canis being a intracellular bacteria, meaning it replicates inside of host cells rather than outside of them. This makes it difficult for antibiotics to reach the bacteria. Different antibiotics have been tried both alone and together, but none are completely effective at eliminating the disease. The combination of minocycline and streptomycin is thought to be useful, but it is often unaffordable. Tetracycline can be a less expensive substitute for minocycline, but it also lowers the effect of the treatment.

Long term antibiotics can be given but usually results in a relapse. Spaying and neutering can be effective, and frequent blood tests are recommended to monitor progress. Dogs in kennels that are affected by B. canis are usually euthanized for the protection of other dogs and the humans caring for them.

B. canis is relatively easy to prevent in dogs. Any dog that will be used for breeding or has the capability to breed should be serologically tested before mating. All dogs new dogs being introduced to a kennel should be examined for signs of the disease and quarantined before being exposed to other dogs.

There are currently no approved serologic tests approved for testing for B. canis in humans. Treatment for human Brucellosis usually includes combination antibiotic treatment for at least 6 weeks. Recovery can range from a few weeks to months, however brucellosis rarely causes death in humans (estimated no more than 2% die from infection).

=== Ecology ===
Under natural conditions Brucella spp, including B. canis are obligate parasites and do not grow outside the host except in laboratory cultures. However, at specific temperatures and moisture levels Brucella can persist in soil and surface water up to 80 days. The bacterium can also survive for months in frozen conditions.

B. canis is mainly found in dogs, but can also affect other wild canine species such as wolves, foxes, and coyotes. The bacterium persists in these hosts, being an adaptive pathogen towards canines. The environment these hosts reside in further contribute to the canine specificity. Dog kennels are a favored environment for the bacterium to spread due to transmission through urine and reproductive fluids. Movement of infected animals through pet trade or shelter transport also plays a critical role in the broader distribution of the bacterium. In wildlife, B. canis is also circulated through hunting and scavenging.

Zoonotic transmission to humans is rare but possible, particularly for people in close contact with infected reproductive tissues. Certain occupations are at higher risk of exposure to B. canis. These persons include veterinarians, kennel workers, dog breeders, and laboratory personnel.

== History ==
Brucella canis was first discovered in the United States by Leland Carmichael in 1966, when the bacterium was identified in canine vaginal discharge and the tissues from mass abortions in beagles. B. canis was said to be a biovar of B. suis. With recent research, PCR assay data was able to contradict B. canis and B. suis. PCR data showed a complete difference between the two strains along with B. suis biovars unattained from B. canis DNA. PCR assays have been proven beneficial when differentiating between Brucella strains and vaccine strains.

Investigations into the bacterium revealed that domestic dogs are primarily affected along with other canine species. B. canis causes reproductive issues in female dogs, usually in the form of late-term spontaneous abortions. While in males, epididymitis, orchitis, and infertility were observed due to the bacterium.

During the 1970s and 1980s, B. canis was reported in North America, Europe, and Asia. The reports were mainly from commercial breeding kennels wherein the bacterium can easily spread. Increase in infections were also attributed to the growing adoption of dogs as pets. By the 2000s, molecular analysis revealed that B. canis is unique from other Brucella species, categorized as a naturally occurring rough species that needs an anti-rough lipopolysaccharide reagent for detection.

B. canis has been recognized as a growing zoonotic risk worldwide, having the ability to infect humans. Laboratory exposure or contact with pet dogs that had aborted fetuses were the main sources of exposure to the bacterium. Human infections are often underdiagnosed due to limited diagnostic awareness and the overlapping clinical presentation with other Brucella species, which hinders precise identification.
