= Hallella =

Scientific classification
- Domain: Bacteria
- Kingdom: Pseudomonadati
- Phylum: Bacteroidota
- Class: Bacteroidia
- Order: Bacteroidales
- Family: Prevotellaceae
- Genus: Hallella; Moore and Moore 1994

Species
- H. seregens

Bacterium

Hallella is a Gram-negative, non-spore-forming, anaerobic and non-motile genus of bacteria from the family of Prevotellaceae with on known species (Hallella seregens). Hallella is named after the American microbiologist Ivan C. Hall. Hallella seregens has been isolated from a gingival crevice of a patient.
