= Prevotella albensis =

Scientific classification
- Domain: Bacteria
- Kingdom: Pseudomonadati
- Phylum: Bacteroidota
- Class: Bacteroidia
- Order: Bacteroidales
- Family: Prevotellaceae
- Genus: Prevotella
- Species: P. albensis

Binomial name
- Prevotella albensis Avgustin et al. 1997

Species of bacterium

Prevotella albensis, previously known as Bacteroides ruminicola subsp. ruminicola, is a species of bacterium.

Prevotella species are part of the human oral and vaginal flora. They play a role in the pathogenesis of periodontal disease, gingivitis, extraoral and some odontogenic infections, and strains are usually carried in families, in so-called intrafamilial carriage. It is also associated with carotid atherosclerosis.
