= Enterotype =

Classification of living organisms based on its gut microbiome

An enterotype is a classification of living organisms based on the bacteriological composition of their gut microbiota. The discovery of three human enterotypes was announced in the April 2011 issue of Nature by Peer Bork and his associates. They found that enterotypes are not dictated by age, gender, body weight, or national divisions. There are indications that long-term diet influences enterotype. Type 1 is characterized by high levels of Bacteroides, type 2 has few Bacteroides but Prevotella are common, and type 3 has high levels of Ruminococcus.

The value of classifying by enterotype has been challenged.

In a study of gut bacteria of children in Burkina Faso (in Africa), Prevotella made up 53% of the gut bacteria, but were absent in age-matched European children.

Studies also indicate that long-term diet is strongly associated with the gut microbiome composition—those who eat plenty of protein and animal fats typical of Western diet have predominantly Bacteroides bacteria, while for those who consume more carbohydrates, especially fibre, the Prevotella species dominate.

Chimpanzees have enterotypes that are compositionally analogous to those found in humans. Using longitudinal samples, researchers found that the enterotype of individual chimpanzees varied over time.
