= Prevotella bryantii =

Scientific classification
- Domain: Bacteria
- Kingdom: Pseudomonadati
- Phylum: Bacteroidota
- Class: Bacteroidia
- Order: Bacteroidales
- Family: Prevotellaceae
- Genus: Prevotella
- Species: P. bryantii

Binomial name
- Prevotella bryantii Avgustin et al. 1997

Species of bacterium

Prevotella bryantii, previously known as Bacteroides ruminicola subsp. brevis biovar 3, is a species of gram-negative bacterium isolated from the bovine rumen.
