= Lactobacillic acid =

Naturally occurring chemical compound from the group of fatty acids

Names
- IUPAC name Lactobacillic acid
- Other names * 10-(2-hexylcyclopropyl)decanoic acid: 10-[(1R,2S)-2-hexylcyclopropyl]decanoic acid; (11R,12S)-methylenoctadecanoic acid; cis-11,12-methylenoctadecanoic acid; Lactobacillus acid; Phytomonic acid

Identifiers
CAS Number	19625-10-6
3D model (JSmol)	Interactive image
ChEBI	CHEBI:34811
ChemSpider	571085
KEGG	C13838
PubChem CID	656761
UNII	SVS08S87RL
- InChI: InChI=1S/C19H36O2/c1-2-3-4-10-13-17-16-18(17)14-11-8-6-5-7-9-12-15-19(20)21/h17-18H,2-16H2,1H3,(H,20,21)/t17-,18+/m0/s1 Key: IJKRDVKGCQRKBI-ZWKOTPCHSA-N
- SMILES: CCCCCC[C@H]1C[C@H]1CCCCCCCCCC(=O)O

Properties
Chemical formula	C_{19}H_{36}O_{2}
Molar mass	296,49 g·mol^{−1}
Melting point	27,8–28,8 °C
Solubility in water	soluble in acetone, chloroform, diethyl ether and petroleum ether
- Except where otherwise noted, data are given for materials in their standard state (at 25 °C [77 °F], 100 kPa). Infobox references

Lactobacillic acid, scientifically 10-(2-hexylcyclopropyl) decanoic acid, is a naturally occurring chemical compound from the group of fatty acids. Its salts are called lactobacillates. A special feature is the cyclopropane ring in the carbon chain. Lactobacillic acid, with 19 carbon atoms, is an odd-chain fatty acid.

The fatty acid was detected in the 1950s in bacteria of the genus Lactobacillus, but is also found in numerous other bacterial species. The bacterial biosynthesis of lactobacillic acid takes place from cis-vaccenic acid (cis-11-octadecenoic acid), a unsaturated fatty acid that has one carbon atom less. Bacteria in a batch culture form the fatty acid at the end of the exponential phase of growth or in the early stationary growth phase. Previous studies have shown that the biosynthesis and storage of lactobacillic acid in the cell membrane is associated with a protective effect for the bacterial cells, although the exact mechanism has not been conclusively clarified. In bacteriology, the fatty acid is mainly used for analytical purposes, for example in the identification of bacteria.

== History ==
=== Discovery ===
In the 1950s, a working group at the University of Pittsburgh conducted research on bacteria of the genus Lactobacillus, which require biotin as a growth factor. It has previously been shown that biotin is no longer necessary for the growth of bacteria if certain fatty acids are present in the culture medium instead. When investigating the influence of biotin on fatty acid metabolism, the researchers initially concentrated on the species L. arabinosus, which according to current systematics is classified as L. plantarum is carried out. They cultivated the bacteria in a semi-synthetic culture medium, harvested the cells and extracted the "free" lipids with acetone and diethyl ether. This fraction makes up about 20% of the total lipids. To obtain the "bound" lipids, an acid hydrolysis was then carried out, in which fatty acids bound as esters were released and also extracted with diethyl ether.

The fatty acids were methylated with diazomethane to the methyl esters and separated according to their boiling points using fractional distillation. Based on the distillation curve, the presence of esters of C_{16}, C_{18} and C_{19} fatty acids was expected. The fatty acid obtained from the C_{19} fraction showed a melting point at 28-29 °C after purification by recrystallization. The compound was investigated using numerous physical and chemical methods and its molecular formula was determined as C_{19}H_{36}O_{2}. In 1950, this was only the second fatty acid with 19 carbon atoms to be isolated from microorganisms. As early as 1929, the tuberculostearic acid, molecular formula C_{19}H_{38}O_{2}) was discovered, which was isolated from the tuberculosis pathogen Mycobacterium tuberculosis. In analogy to its name, the biochemists suggested the English name 'lactobacillic acid', as the fatty acid originated from a Lactobacillus species. Lactobacillic acid has also been isolated from L. casei. In the publication, the scientists emphasized the implications of their discovery, which contradicted the opinion at the time that only fatty acids with an even number of carbon atoms occur in nature.

=== Structure elucidation ===
Hydrogenation reaction scheme of lactobacillic acid: The hydrogenation of lactobacillic acid (1) with hydrogen (H2) results in several hydrogenation products: Cleavage of bond 1 (red) leads to nonadecanoic acid (2), cleavage of bond 2 (blue) or 3 (green) leads to a mixture of methyloctadecanoic acids (3), (4).

The "free" and "bound" lipids do not differ significantly in their fatty acid composition. In addition to lactobacillic acid with a share of 31%, palmitic acid (C16:0), stearic acid (C18:0) and cis-vaccenic acid (C18:1 cis-11) with a proportion of 37%, 2% and 20% respectively. The test results of the newly discovered fatty acid showed that it is a saturated fatty acid. It is stable towards oxidizing agents that would react with a double bond in the carbon chain. In the reaction with hydrogen bromide (HBr), however, an addition of HBr occurs in the molecule. Hydrogenation is also possible, resulting in several isomers fatty acids with the molecular formula C_{19}H_{38}O_{2}, one of which has been identified as nonadecanoic acid. The other compound is a branched-chain fatty acid with a methyl group as a branch (methyloctadecanoic acid), although the scientists could not distinguish at the time whether one or more isomers of it were present. Based on the results of the chemical and physical (infrared spectroscopy and X-ray diffraction) methods for structure elucidation, a saturated fatty acid with a cyclopropane ring in the carbon chain was proposed as the structure.

Proposal of the structural formula of lactobacillic acid (1953)

cis-trans isomerism of lactobacillic acid; above the cis isomer, below the trans isomer

from its lipids. By comparison with synthetically produced fatty acids, they were able to determine the position of the cyclopropane ring and proposed the name 11,12-methyleneoctadecanoic acid, without specifying the stereoisomerism of the structure.

Viewed from the cyclopropane ring, different substituents are present on two carbon atoms, resulting in cis-trans-isomerism (see figure). The substituents can be on the same side (cis) or on different sides (trans) of the ring bond. Hofmann et al. were initially unable to clarify which structure was actually present at the time of discovery. However, in 1954 they hypothesized that the cis isomer was present. This was confirmed by a Canadian research group in 2005. A clear description of the spatial arrangement of the substituents is possible with the help of the Cahn-Ingold-Prelog priority rules, according to which the absolute configuration of the molecule is given as 11R,12S. The derived name (11R,12S)-methylenoctadecanoic acid is commonly used, even if it does not correspond to the recommendations of the IUPAC nomenclature. For the systematic naming of lactobacillic acid, the absolute configuration is given from the cyclopropane ring, with a C_{6} substituent (hexyl group) and a C_{10} substituent containing the carboxy group (decanoic acid), thus giving 10-[(1R,2S)-2-hexylcyclopropyl]decanoic acid

=== Etymology ===
Lactobacillic acid and Lactobacillussäure are translations of the English term 'lactobacillic acid', which scientists proposed when this fatty acid was discovered (1950) in a Lactobacillus species. In the German-language literature, the term lactobacillic acid is used more frequently than lactobacillus acid. As early as 1938, another group of researchers discovered an unusual fatty acid from the bacterium Agrobacterium tumefaciens (at that time called Bacterium tumefaciens or Phytomonas tumefaciens) was isolated and after the generic name as phytomonic acid. According to the knowledge of scientists at the time, this saturated fatty acid had the molecular formula C_{20}H_{40}O_{2}. The proposed structure was a branched-chain fatty acid with a methyl group as a branch, methylnonadecanoic acid. However, K. Homann et al. were able to show in 1955 that this compound isolated from P. tumefaciens was in fact lactobacillic acid. According to them, the substance originally investigated had been contaminated.

== Occurrence ==
=== Occurrence of lactobacillic acid ===
Following the discovery of lactobacillic acid in the lipids of Lactobacillus arabinosus, Klaus Hofmann's team was also able to determine this fatty acid in the lipids of Lactobacillus casei with a content of 16%. It is also present in L. acidophilus, L. buchneri, L. delbrueckii subsp. bulgaricus, L. delbrueckii subsp. lactis, L. fermentum and L. helveticus with a content of 10 to 30% has been detected. However, lactobacillic acid is not restricted to members of the genus Lactobacillus or lactic acid bacteria in general. The fatty acid was also found in higher proportions (10-20%) in gram-negative bacteria, such as Agrobacterium tumefaciens and Escherichia coli detected, in smaller quantities (5-10%) also in Serratia marcescens, Klebsiella aerogenes and Pseudomonas fluorescens. Brucellaspecies also contain lactobacillic acid, as well as Bordetella species, but the content here is only 1-2%.

Lactobacillic acid is found in both Gram-positive and Gram-negative bacteria and is found in strictly aerobic, microaerophilic, facultative and strictly anaerobic genera. genera. Although the fatty acid is widely distributed in bacteria, it is not found in all genera. Bacteria that do not have unsaturated fatty acids in their membrane lipids do not have lactobacillic acid. This applies in particular to thermophilic bacteria and archaea. However, the fatty acid is found rather rarely in eukaryotic organisms. It is contained, for example, in rapeseed oil, which contains little erucic acid (so-called LEAR varieties).

=== Occurrence of other cyclopropane fatty acids ===
The biosynthesis and occurrence of lactobacillic acid is closely linked to dihydrosterculic acid (compare sterculic acid), which is also a saturated fatty acid with the molecular formula C_{19}H_{36}O_{2}, which contains a cyclopropane ring. Here, however, the ring is located at positions 9 and 10 of the carbon chain, which is why it is also referred to as cis-9,10-methylenoctadecanoic acid. Dihydrosterculic acid is also found in the lipids of many bacterial genera, but has also been found in eukaryotes, for example in protozoa from the Trypanosomatida group, here in the genera Crithidia, Leishmania, Leptomonas, Herpetomonas and Phytomonas. According to a study published in 2014, lactobacillic acid and dihydrosterculic acid are also found in cow's milk in very small quantities (< 0.1% of total fatty acids), but not in the milk of goats or sheep.

== Extraction and presentation ==
=== Extraction ===
Lactobacillic acid can be isolated from the lipids of bacteria, as used by the working group during the discovery. First, hydrolysis (saponification) of the phospholipids or triglycerides is carried out, releasing the fatty acid bound as an ester. Since other fatty acids are present in addition to lactobacillic acid, separation is then carried out using urea extraction crystallization or column chromatography. The fractional crystallization process can also be used.

=== Chemical synthesis ===
The chemical synthesis is similar to the biosynthesis, starting from the unsaturated compound without a cyclopropane ring, the vaccenic acid. In a Simmons-Smith reaction, a carbene is added to the double bond of the unsaturated fatty acid; diiodomethane and zinc are used to form the carbene. The Simmons-Smith reaction is stereospecific, for the preparation of cis-11,12-methylenoctadecenoic acid (lactobacillic acid) the cis-11-octadecenoic acid (cis-vaccenoic acid) is used. This can be of natural origin or synthesized from 11-octadecic acid.

=== Biosynthesis in bacteria ===
Biosynthesis of lactobacillic acid: S-adenosylmethionine SAM (1) provides the methylene group for cis-vaccenic acid (2); the reaction mechanism proceeds via the formation of a carbocation (3); lactobacillic acid (4) is formed from this, while SAM is hydrolyzed to homocysteine (5) and adenosine (6); the "R" in the fatty acids indicates that they are not free, but are bound in phospholipids, for example.

The basic principles of the biosynthesis of lactobacillic acid were already clarified in 1961. Lactobacillic acid, as well as other naturally occurring cyclopropane fatty acids (also abbreviated as CFA or CPFA) are formed from the corresponding unsaturated fatty acids, which have one carbon atom less, and have a cis configuration on the cyclopropane ring. The precursor of lactobacillic acid (cis-11,12-methylenoctadecanoic acid) is thus cis-vaccenic acid (cis-11-octadecenoic acid). This was demonstrated by carbon isotope^{14}C labeled precursors.

With the help of the enzymes cyclopropane fatty acid synthase, a methylene group is added to the double bond of cis-vaccenic acid. The methylene group originates from S-adenosylmethionine. The unsaturated fatty acid is not free, but is bound as an ester within phospholipids. The reaction mechanism proceeds via the formation of a carbocation. The enzyme catalyzes the reaction only with unsaturated fatty acids whose double bond has a cis configuration; the corresponding trans isomers are not converted.

When the bacteria are cultivated in a batch culture, the formation of CFA occurs suddenly at a certain point in time rather than steadily increasing in concentration. At the same time, a decrease in the concentration of the unsaturated fatty acid (as a precursor) is observed. The formation of cyclopropane fatty acid occurs at the end of the exponential phase of growth or in the early stationary growth phase.

== Biological significance ==
=== Physiological significance for bacteria ===
As lactobacillic acid was discovered in bacteria that require biotin as a growth factor, studies were initially carried out on these bacteria in the 1950s. In the case of Lactobacillus plantarum (then L. arabinosus), L. casei and L. delbrueckii, it was found that they can grow without biotin if the culture medium contains lactobacillic acid.L. acidophilus, for which biotin is not essential, is promoted in growth by lactobacillic acid. It is now known that biotin is an important component of various enzymes of fat metabolism, e.g. acetyl-CoA carboxylase and propionyl-CoA carboxylase. It was also recognized at the time that several saturated fatty acids have inhibitory effects on bacterial growth, but that this effect is neutralized by lactobacillic acid and some unsaturated fatty acids. Since then, several studies have shown that the synthesis of lactobacillic acid is an advantage for the corresponding bacteria to adapt to unfavorable environmental conditions. Examples of this are non-optimal or even extreme temperatures, falling pH value in the medium or entry into the stationary growth phase.

The significance of cyclopropane fatty acid synthesis is still the subject of research. To this end, mutants of Escherichia coli lacking the cfa gene, which codes for the enzyme cyclopropane fatty acid synthase encode, were examined. The absence of the enzyme has no negative effect on growth and the bacteria show no phenotypeic differences, with the exception that lactobacillic acid or other cyclopropanoic acids do not occur among the fatty acids present. A similar experiment was carried out with artificially produced mutants of Brucella abortus. The bacteria are still able to multiply in macrophages, so lactobacillic acid has no effect on the intracellular life cycle. However, if the bacteria are cultivated in a culture medium with a low pH value and high osmolarity, less growth can be observed compared to the unmodified cells. These conditions can be transferred to the survival of B. abortus in the environment, where an acidic environment with high osmolarity can also occur. The mutants that do not produce lactobacillic acid have poorer chances of survival there and consequently cannot be transferred to a host as easily as is the case with a smear infection, for example. The study of the promoter of the cfa gene also shows that expression is promoted by low pH and high osmolarity, i.e. the enzyme CFA synthase is formed under these conditions.

From the point of view of energy metabolism, the formation of the cyclopropane ring in lactobacillic acid means a relatively high energy expenditure for the cell. The S adenosylmethionine, which acts as a carrier of the methylene group, must then be regenerated from S adenosylhomocysteine. This is associated with the hydrolytic cleavage of three ATP molecules per molecule. It was therefore assumed that the cyclopropane ring serves as a storage for an activated methylene group to enable subsequent methylation reactions. This is contradicted by the fact that the lactobacillic acid content remains constant, at least in E. coli. The time of biosynthesis suggests that the fatty acid has a protective effect on the bacterial cells in the subsequent stationary phase. However, despite intensive research, it has not yet been possible to clarify exactly what this protective effect consists of.

The composition of the fatty acids in the phospholipids of the cell membrane influences their fluidity. A replacement of cis vaccenic acid by lactobacillic acid has different effects depending on the position of the glycerol at which the fatty acid is esterified in the phosphoglyceride. Within the temperature range relevant for most living organisms, the incorporation of a fatty acid with a cyclopropane ring tends to mean that a change in temperature does not have a major influence on fluidity. The biomembrane is therefore fluid over a somewhat wider temperature range. Contrary to what the cyclopropane structure suggests, lactobacillic acid - bound in the phospholipids - is relatively stable. Compared to the unsaturated fatty acid (as a precursor in biosynthesis), it is even more stable in relation to mild oxidizing agents, such as when treated with ozone (ozonolysis) or with photochemically formed singlet oxygen. This is interpreted by some researchers to mean that although the incorporation of lactobacillic acid into the cell membrane has no significant influence on the physical properties of the membrane, it does change its chemical properties, which is an advantage for the organism.

One example of a beneficial effect of lactobacillic acid is provided by Oenococcus oeni. The lactic acid bacterium is used in wine production to convert malic acid into lactic acid during malolactic fermentation into lactic acid, which in turn is converted into ethanol by baker's yeast. In this way, the acidity of the wine is reduced. In the process, Oenococcus oeni is exposed to relatively high concentrations of ethanol produced by yeasts during alcoholic fermentation. Studies of the cell membrane of the bacterium have shown that the biosynthesis rate of phospholidides is increased with increasing ethanol concentration in the surrounding culture medium. In addition, more lactobacillic acid is formed in the membrane lipids, while the content of cis vaccenic acid decreases. This is interpreted as a protective mechanism against the toxic effects of ethanol. The formation of lactobacillic acid helps the bacterium to adapt to unfavorable environmental conditions. A similar protective effect was discovered in L. delbrueckii subsp. bulgaricus. It shows improved survivability against freeze-drying when more lactobacillic acid is present in the cell membrane.

The probiotic The effect of Lactobacillus reuteri is attributed to immunomodulating substances that inhibit the production of the cytokine TNF (tumor necrosis factor) in humans. Examination of the membrane lipids of various strains of Lactobacillus reuteri shows that only the TNF-inhibiting strains have lactobacillic acid. In this experiment, the cfa gene was also inactivated in a lactobacillic acid-producing bacterial strain and the mutants were cultivated. The supernatant was tested in a cell culture and - in contrast to the supernatant of the wild type - suppresses the production of TNF. However, the addition of lactobacillic acid as a pure substance does not lead to the inhibition of cytokine production. Thus, the fatty acid is only indirectly involved in the immunomodulatory activity of L. reuteri; an altered membrane fluidity is cited as a possible explanation.

=== Classification and identification of bacteria ===
With the development of instrumental methods for fatty acid analysis, the detection of different fatty acids in bacteria has become a common analytical feature since the 1970s. The fatty acid patterns are often used for taxonomic classification, as related species often have a similar composition of fatty acids in the lipids. The pattern of fatty acid distribution can be used to differentiate between Brucella and Bordetella species. Research results from 2013 show that the occurrence of lactobacillic acid in Brucella canis depends on the geographical origin of the bacterial strains and indicate that only human pathogenic strains contain this fatty acid. Also used to distinguish Weissella species or other lactic acid bacteria

== Proof ==
The detection as well as the quantitative determination of lactobacillic acid is carried out - as is usual for fatty acids - by gas chromatography of the methyl ester, often as gas chromatography with mass spectrometry coupling (GC/MS). Because of the cyclopropane ring, however, care must be taken to use a suitable methylation reagent. Not suitable, for example, is hydrogen chloride in anhydrous methanol, as this reagent can react with the cyclopropane ring, resulting in a branched-chain fatty acid with a methoxy group. However, sodium methanolate in anhydrous methanol is well suited, as is sodium hydroxide or potassium hydroxide in methanol. The formation of 3-pyridyl methyl esters (picolinyl esters) with nicotinyl alcohol is particularly recommended for structural elucidation using mass spectrometry methods. (pyridylmethanol) is recommended.

== Literature ==
- Hofmann K, Lucas RA, SAX SM (1952). "The chemical nature of the fatty acids of Lactobacillus arabinosus". J Biol Chem. 195 (2): 473–85. doi:10.1016/S0021-9258(18)55754-9. PMID 14946156.
- Dennis W. Grogan, John. E. Cronan, Jr. (1997), "Cyclopropane ring formation in membrane lipids of bacteria", Microbiology and Molecular Biology Reviews, vol. 61, no. 4, pp. 429–441, Bibcode:1997MMBR...61..429G, doi:10.1128/mmbr.61.4.429-441.1997, PMC 232619, PMID 9409147
