= Methylorubrum rhodinum =

Scientific classification
- Domain: Bacteria
- Kingdom: Pseudomonadati
- Phylum: Pseudomonadota
- Class: Alphaproteobacteria
- Order: Hyphomicrobiales
- Family: Methylobacteriaceae
- Genus: Methylorubrum
- Species: M. rhodinum

Binomial name
- Methylorubrum rhodinum (Heumann 1962) Green and Ardley 2018

Synonyms
- Methylobacterium rhodinum corrig. (Heumann 1962) Green and Bousfield 1983; Pseudomonas rhodos Heumann 1962 (Approved Lists 1980); Methylobacterium rhodos (Heumann 1962) Green and Bousfield 1983

Species of bacterium

Methylorubrum rhodinum is a Gram-negative soil bacterium.
