= Anaerobic infection =

Infection caused by anaerobic bacteria

Anaerobic infections are caused by anaerobic bacteria. Obligately anaerobic bacteria do not grow on solid media in room air (0.04% carbon dioxide and 21% oxygen); facultatively anaerobic bacteria can grow in the presence or absence of air. Microaerophilic bacteria do not grow at all aerobically or grow poorly, but grow better under 10% carbon dioxide or anaerobically. Anaerobic bacteria can be divided into strict anaerobes that can not grow in the presence of more than 0.5% oxygen and moderate anaerobic bacteria that are able of growing between 2 and 8% oxygen. Anaerobic bacteria usually do not possess catalase, but some can generate superoxide dismutase which protects them from oxygen.

The clinically important anaerobes in decreasing frequency are: 1. Six genera of Gram-negative rods (Bacteroides, Prevotella, Porphyromonas, Fusobacterium, Bilophila and Sutterella spp.); 2. Gram-positive cocci (primarily Peptostreptococcus spp.); 3. Gram-positive spore-forming (Clostridium spp.) and non-spore-forming bacilli (Actinomyces, Propionibacterium, Eubacterium, Lactobacillus and Bifidobacterium spp.); and 4. Gram-negative cocci (mainly Veillonella spp.).

The frequency of isolation of anaerobic bacterial strains varies in different infectious sites. Mixed infections caused by numerous aerobic and anaerobic bacteria are often observed in clinical situations.

Anaerobic bacteria are a common cause of infections, some of which can be serious and life-threatening. Because anaerobes are the predominant components of the normal flora of the skin and mucous membranes, they are a common cause of infections of endogenous origin. Because of their fastidious nature, anaerobes are hard to culture and isolate and are often not recovered from infected sites. The administration of delayed or inappropriate therapy against these organisms may lead to failures in eradication of these infections. The isolation of anaerobic bacteria requires adequate methods for collection, transportation and cultivation of clinical specimens. The management of anaerobic infection is often difficult because of the slow growth of anaerobic organisms, which can delay their identification by the frequent polymicrobial nature of these infections and by the increasing resistance of anaerobic bacteria to antimicrobials.

== Signs and symptoms ==
Anaerobes have been found in infections throughout the human body. The frequency of the host or patient's recovery depends on the employment of proper methods of collection of specimen, their transportation to the microbiology laboratory and cultivation. The recovery of organisms depends on the site of infection and is related to the adjacent mucous membranes' microbial flora.

=== Central nervous system ===
Anaerobes are able to cause all types of intracranial infections. These often cause subdural empyema, and brain abscess, and rarely cause epidural abscess and meningitis. The origin of brain abscess is generally an adjacent chronic ear, mastoid, or sinus infection oropharynx, teeth or lungs. Mastoid and ear or infections generally progress to the temporal lobe or cerebellum, while facial sinusitis commonly causes frontal lobe abscess. Hematogenous spread of the infection into the CNS often occurs after oropharyngeal, dental, or pulmonary infection. Infrequently bacteremia originating of another location or endocarditis can also cause intracranial infection.

Meningitis due to anaerobic bacteria is infrequent and may follow respiratory tract infection or complicate a cerebrospinal fluid shunt. Neurological shunt infections are often caused by skin bacteria such as Cutibacterium acnes, or in instances of ventriculoperitoneal shunts that perforate the gut, by anaerobes of enteric origin (i.e. Bacteroides fragilis).Clostridium perfringens can cause of brain abscesses and meningitis following intracranial surgery or head trauma.

The anaerobes often isolated from brain abscesses complicating respiratory and dental infections are anaerobic Gram-negative bacilli (AGNB, including Prevotella, Porphyromonas, Bacteroides), Fusobacterium and Peptostreptococcus spp. Microaerophilic and other streptococci are also often isolated. Actinomyces are rarely isolated.

At the stage of encephalitis, antimicrobial therapy and utilization of measures to lower the increase in the intracranial pressure can prevent the formation of an intracranial abscess However, after an abscess has emerged, surgical removal or drainage may be necessary, along with an extended course of antimicrobial therapy (4–8 weeks). Some advocate complete drainage of intracranial abscess, while others use repeated aspirations of the abscess. Repeated aspirations of an abscess are preferable in those with multiple abscesses or when the abscess is located in a predominate brain site. Administration of antimicrobials in a high-dose for an extended period of time can offer an alternative treatment strategy in this type of patients and may substitute for surgical evacuation of an abscess.

Because of the poor penetration of many antimicrobial agents through the blood–brain barrier, there are few agents available for the treatment of intracranial infections. The antimicrobials with good intracranial penetration are metronidazole, chloramphenicol, penicillins, and meropenem. Optimally, the selection of antimicrobial is done according to the recovered isolates and their antimicrobial susceptibilities. A substantial improvement in patients' survival rate has occurred after the introduction of computed tomography (CT) and other scans and utilization of metronidazole therapy.

=== Upper respiratory tract and head and neck infections ===
Anaerobes can be isolated from most types of upper respiratory tract and head and neck infection, and are especially common in chronic ones. These include tonsillar, peritonsillar and retropharyngeal abscesses, chronic otitis media, sinusitis and mastoiditis, eye ocular) infections, all deep neck space infections, parotitis, sialadenitis, thyroiditis, odontogenic infections, and postsurgical and nonsurgical head and neck wounds and abscesses. The predominant organisms are of oropharyngeal flora origin and include AGNB, Fusobacterium and Peptostreptococcus spp.

Anaerobes involve almost all dental infections. These include dental abscesses, endodontal pulpitis and periodontal (gingivitis and periodontitis) infections, and perimandibular space infection. Pulpitis can lead to abscess formation and eventually spread to the mandible and other neck spaces. In addition to strict anaerobic bacteria, microaerophilic streptococci and Streptococcus salivarius can also be present.

Fusobacterium spp. and anaerobic spirochetes are often the cause of acute necrotizing ulcerative gingivitis (or Vincent's angina) which is a distinct form of ulcerative gingivitis.

Deep neck infections that develop as a consequence of oral, dental and pharyngeal infections are generally polymicrobial in nature. These include extension of retropharyngeal cellulitis or abscess, mediastinitis following esophagus perforation, and dental or periodontal abscess.

=== Lung infections ===
In adults the most common source of aspiration pneumonia is aspiration of oropharyngeal secretions or gastric contents. In children the most common cause is aspiration of infected amniotic fluid, or vaginal secretions. Severe periodontal or gingival diseases are important risk factors for establishment of an anaerobic pleuropulmonary infection. Progression of the infection from pneumonitis into necrotizing pneumonia and pulmonary abscess can occur, with or without the development of empyema. The infection is often polymicrobial in nature and isolates of community-acquired infection (in 60–80% of cases) are aerobic and anaerobic belonging to the individual's oropharyngeal flora. The anaerobic bacteria commonly recovered are Prevotella, Porphyromonas, Fusobacterium and Peptostreptococcus spp., and the aerobic bacteria are beta-hemolytic and microaerophilic streptococci. Anaerobic bacteria can also be isolated in about 35% of individuals who have nosocomial-acquired aspiration pneumonia and pneumonia associated with tracheostomy with and without mechanical ventilation, where they are often isolated along with Enterobacteriaceae, Pseudomonas spp. and Staphylococcus aureus. It is important that specimens are obtained in a method that avoids their contamination by the oral microflora.

=== Abdominal infections ===
Secondary peritonitis and intra-abdominal abscesses including splenic and hepatic abscesses generally occur because of the entry of enteric micro-organisms into the peritoneal cavity through a defect in the wall of the intestine or other viscus as a result of obstruction, infarction or direct trauma. Perforated appendicitis, diverticulitis, inflammatory bowel disease with perforation and gastrointestinal surgery are often associated with polymicrobial infections caused by aerobic and anaerobic bacteria, where the number of isolates can average 12 (two-thirds are generally anaerobes). The most common aerobic and facultative bacteria are Escherichia coli, Streptococcus spp. (including Enterococcus spp.), and the most frequently isolated anaerobic bacteria are the B. fragilis group, Peptostreptococcus spp., and Clostridium spp.

Abdominal infections are characteristically biphasic: an initial stages of generalized peritonitis associated with Escherichia coli sepsis, and a later stages, in which intra abdominal abscesses harboring anaerobic bacteria (including B. fragilis group) emerge.

The clinical manifestations of secondary peritonitis are a reflection of the underlying disease process. Fever, diffuse abdominal pain, nausea and vomiting are common. Physical examination generally show signs of peritoneal inflammation, isuch as rebound tenderness, abdominal wall rigidity and decrease in bowel sounds. These early findings may be followed by signs and symptoms of shock.

Biliary tract infection is usually caused by E. coli, Klebsiella and Enterococcus spp. Anaerobes (mostly B. fragilis group, and rarely C. perfringens) can be recovered in complicated infections associated with carcinoma, recurrent infection, obstruction, bile tract surgery or manipulation.

Laboratory studies show elevated blood leukocyte count and predominance of polymorphonuclear forms. Radiographs studies may show free air in the peritoneal cavity, evidence of ileus or obstruction and obliteration of the psoas shadow. Diagnostic ultrasound, gallium and CT scanning may detect appendiceal or other intra-abdominal abscesses. Polymicrobial postoperative wound infections can occur.

Treatment of mixed aerobic and anaerobic abdominal infections requires the utilization of antimicrobials effective against both components of the infection as well as surgical correction and drainage of pus. Single and easily accessible abscesses can be drained percutaneously.

=== Female genital infections ===
Female genital tract infections caused by anaerobic bacteria are polymicrobial and include: soft-tissue perineal, vulvar and Bartholin gland abscesses; bacterial vaginosis; endometritis; pyometra; salpingitis; adnexal abscess; tubo-ovarian abscesses; intrauterine contraceptive device-associated infection; pelvic inflammatory disease, which may include pelvic cellulitis and abscess; amnionitis; septic pelvic thrombophlebitis; septic abortion; and postsurgical obstetric and gynecologic infections. Getting adequate microbiological cultures is essential. It is important to avoid contaminating the culture with the normal genital flora. Methods that can ensure adequate cultures are laparoscopy, culdocentesis, or obtaining quantitative endometrial cultures employing a telescoping catheter.

The anaerobes often recovered include Prevotella bivia, Prevotella disiens, and Peptostreptococcus, Porphyromonas and Clostridium spp. Bacteroides fragilis group is rarely recovered in these infections compared to intra-abdominal infection. Actinomyces spp. and Eubacterium nodatum are often recovered in infections associated with intrauterine devices. Mobiluncus spp. can be associated with bacterial vaginosis. The aerobic bacteria also found mixed with these anaerobic bacteria include Enterobacteriaceae, Streptococcus spp. (including groups A and B), Neisseria gonorrhoeae, Chlamydia spp. and Mycoplasma hominis. Free gas in the tissues, abscess formation and foul-smelling discharge is commonly associated with the presence of anaerobic bacteria. Treatment of these infections includes the use of antimicrobials active against all of the potential aerobic and anaerobic bacterial pathogens. Antimicrobials against sexually transmissible pathogens should also be administered.

=== Skin and soft-tissue infections ===
The infections that frequently involve anaerobic bacteria include superficial infections, including infected paronychia, infected human or animal bites, cutaneous ulcers, cellulitis, pyoderma, and hidradenitis suppurativa. Secondary infected sites include secondary infected diaper rash, gastrostomy or tracheostomy site wounds, scabies or kerion infections, eczema, psoriasis, poison ivy, atopic dermatitis, eczema herpeticum, infected subcutaneous sebaceous or inclusion cysts, and postsurgical wound infection.

Skin involvement in subcutaneous tissue infections includes: cutaneous and subcutaneous abscesses, breast abscess, decubitus ulcers, infected pilonidal cyst or sinus, Meleney's ulcer infected diabetic (vascular or trophic) ulcers, bite wound, anaerobic cellulitis and gas gangrene, bacterial synergistic gangrene, and burn wound infection. Deeper anaerobic soft-tissue infections are necrotizing fasciitis, necrotizing synergistic cellulitis, gas gangrene and crepitus cellulitis. These can involve the fascia as well as the muscle surrounded by the fascia, and may also induce myositis and myonecrosis.

The isolates found in soft-tissue infections can vary depending on the type of infection. The infection's location and the circumstances causing the infection can also influence the nature of the microorganisms recovered. Bacteria that are members of the 'normal flora' of the region of the infection are often also isolated from lesions involving anaerobic bacteria.

Specimens obtained from wounds and subcutaneous tissue infections and abscesses in the rectal area (perirectal abscess, decubitus ulcer) or that are of gut flora origin(i.e. diabetic foot infection) often to yield colonic flora organisms. These are generally B. fragilis group, Clostridium spp., Enterobacteriaceae and Enterococcus spp. On the other hand, infections in and around the oropharynx, or infections that originate from that location, frequently contain oral flora organisms (i.e. paronychia, bites, breast abscess). These bacteria include pigmented Prevotella and Porphyromonas, Fusobacterium and Peptostreptococcus spp. Skin flora organisms such as S. aureus and Streptococcus spp., or nosocomially acquired microorganisms can be recovered at all body locations. Human bite infections often contain Eikenella spp. and animal bites harbor Pasteurella multocida in addition to oral flora.

Anaerobes infections are often polymicrobial in nature, and sometimes (i.e. decubitus ulcers, diabetic foot ulcer) they are complicated by bacteremia and/or osteomyelitis. Infections which are in the deep tissues (necrotizing cellulitis, fasciitis and myositis) often include Clostridium spp., S. pyogenes or polymicrobic combinations of both aerobic and anaerobic bacteria. Gas in the tissues and putrid-like pus with a gray thin quality are often found in these infections, and they are frequently associated with a bacteremia and high mortality rate.

Treatment of deep-seated soft-tissue infections includes: vigorous surgical management that includes surgical debridement and drainage. Even though there are no controlled studies that support this approach improvement of the involved tissues oxygenation by enhancement of blood supply and administration of hyperbaric oxygen, especially in clostridial infection, may be helpful.

=== Osteomyelitis and septic arthritis ===
Anaerobic bacteria are often found in osteomyelitis of the long bones especially after trauma and fracture, osteomyelitis associated with peripheral vascular disease, and decubitus ulcers and osteomyelitis of the facial and cranial bones. Many of these bone infections are polymicrobial in nature.

Cranial and facial bones anaerobic osteomyelitis often originates by the spread of the infection from a contiguous soft-tissue source or from dental, sinus, or ear infection. The high concentration of anaerobic bacteria in the oral cavity explains their importance in cranial and facial bone infections. The high number of gut anaerobes in pelvic osteomyelitis is generally caused by their spread from decubitus ulcers sites. The anaerobic organisms in osteomyelitis associated with peripheral vascular disease generally reach the bone from adjacent soft-tissue ulcers. Long bones osteomyelitis is often caused by trauma, hematogenic spread, or the presence of a prosthetic device.

Peptostreptococcus and Bacteroides spp. are the most frequently recovered isolates at all bone infections, including those caused by bites and cranial infection. Pigmented Prevotella and Porphyromonas spp. are especially common in bite and skull bone infections, whereas members of the B. fragilis group are often found in vascular disease or neuropathy. Fusobacterium spp., which belongs to the oral microflora, are most often isolated from bites and from cranial and facial bone infections. Clostridium spp. are frequently recovered in long bones infections, mostly in association with traumatic wounds. Because Clostridium spp. colonize the lower gastrointestinal tract, they can contaminate compound lower extremities fractures.

Septic arthritis due to anaerobic bacteria is frequently associated with contiguous or hematogenous infection spread, prosthetic joints and trauma. Most septic arthritis cases caused by anaerobic bacteria are monomicrobial. The predominant anaerobic bacteria isolated are Peptostreptococcus spp. and Propionibacterium acnes (frequently found in prosthetic joint infection), B. fragilis and Fusobacterium spp. (frequently found in infections of hematogenic origin), and Clostridium spp. (frequently found in infections after trauma).

=== Bacteremia ===
The incidence of anaerobic bacteria in bacteremia varies between 5% and 15%, The incidence of anaerobic bacteremia in the 1990s declined to about 4% (0.5–12%) of all cases of bacteremias. A resurgence in bacteremia due to anaerobic bacteria was observed recently. This is explained by a greater number of anaerobic bacteremia in patients with complex underlying disease or those that are immunosuppressed. The commonest isolates are B. fragilis group (over 75% of anaerobic isolates), Clostridium spp. (10–20%), Peptostreptococcus spp. (10–15%), Fusobacterium spp. (10–15%) and P. acnes (2–5%).

The type of bacteria involved in bacteremia is greatly influenced by the infection's portal of entry and the underlying disease. The isolation of B. fragilis group and Clostridium spp. is often associated with a gastrointestinal source, pigmented Prevotella and Porphyromonas spp. and Fusobacterium spp.with oropharynx and pulmonary sites, Fusobacterium spp. with the female genital tract locations, Propionibacterium acnes with a foreign body, and Peptostreptococcus spp. with all infection sources, but mostly with oropharyngeal, pulmonary and female genital tract locations. The association of these organisms is related to the origin of the initial infection and the endogenous bacterial flora at that site.

The main factors which predispose to anaerobic bacteremia are: hematologic disorders; organ transplant; recent gastrointestinal, obstetric, or gynecologic surgery; malignant neoplasms intestinal obstruction; decubitus ulcers; dental extraction; sickle cell disease; diabetes mellitus; postsplenectomy; the newborn; and the administration of cytotoxic agents or corticosteroids.

The clinical presentations of anaerobic bacteremia are not different from those observed in aerobic bacteremia, except for the infection's signs observed at the portal of entry of the infection. It often includes fever, chills, hypotension, shock, leukocytosis, anemia and disseminated intravascular coagulation. Clinical features that are characteristic of anaerobicbacteremia include hyperbilirubinemia, metastatic lesions, and suppurative thrombophlebitis. The mortality rate varies between 15% and 30% and can be improved in those who are diagnosed early and receive appropriate antimicrobial therapy and their primary infection when present is resolved.

=== Neonatal infection ===
The newborn's exposure to the maternal vaginal bacterial flora which contains aerobic and anaerobic bacterial flora can lead to the development of anaerobic bacterial infection. These infections include cellulitis of the site of fetal monitoring (caused by Bacteroides spp.), bacteremia, aspiration pneumonia (caused by Bacteroides spp.), conjunctivitis (caused by clostridia), omphalitis (caused by mixed flora), and infant botulism. Clostridial species may play a role in necrotizing enterocolitis. Management of these infection necessitates treating of the underlying condition(s) when present, and administration of proper antimicrobial therapy.

== Causes ==
Condition predisposing to anaerobic infections include: exposure of a sterile body location to a high inoculum of indigenous bacteria of mucous membrane flora origin, inadequate blood supply and tissue necrosis which lower the oxidation and reduction potential which support the growth of anaerobes. Conditions which can lower the blood supply and can predispose to anaerobic infection are: trauma, foreign body, malignancy, surgery, edema, shock, colitis and vascular disease. Other predisposing conditions include splenectomy, neutropenia, immunosuppression, hypogammaglobinemia, leukemia, collagen vascular disease and cytotoxic drugs and diabetes mellitus. A preexisting infection caused by aerobic or facultative organisms can alter the local tissue conditions and make them more favorable for the growth of anaerobes. Impairment in defense mechanisms due to anaerobic conditions can also favor anaerobic infection. These include production of leukotoxins (by Fusobacterium spp.), phagocytosis intracellular killing impairments (often caused by encapsulated anaerobes) and by succinic acid (produced by Bacteroides spp.), chemotaxis inhibition (by Fusobacterium, Prevotella and Porphyromonas spp.), protease degradation of serum proteins (by Bacteroides spp.) and production of leukotoxins (by Fusobacterium spp.).

The hallmarks of anaerobic infection include suppuration, establishment of an abscess, thrombophlebitis and gangrenous destruction of tissue with gas generation. Anaerobic bacteria are very commonly recovered in chronic infections, and are often found following the failure of therapy with antimicrobials that are ineffective against them, such as trimethoprim–sulfamethoxazole (co-trimoxazole), aminoglycosides, and the earlier quinolones.

Some infections are more likely to be caused by anaerobic bacteria, and they should be suspected in most instances. These infections include brain abscess, oral or dental infections, human or animal bites, aspiration pneumonia and lung abscesses, amnionitis, endometritis, septic abortions, tubo-ovarian abscess, peritonitis and abdominal abscesses following viscus perforation, abscesses in and around the oral and rectal areas, pus-forming necrotizing infections of soft tissue or muscle and postsurgical infections that emerge following procedures on the oral or gastrointestinal tract or female pelvic area. Some solid malignant tumors, (colonic, uterine and bronchogenic, and head and neck necrotic tumors, are more likely to become secondarily infected with anaerobes. The lack of oxygen within the tumor that are proximal to the endogenous adjacent mucosal flora can predispose such infections.

== Management ==
Recovery from an anaerobic infection depends on adequate and rapid management. The main principles of managing anaerobic infections are neutralizing the toxins produced by anaerobic bacteria, preventing the local proliferation of these organisms by altering the environment and preventing their dissemination and spread to healthy tissues.

Toxin can be neutralized by specific antitoxins, mainly in infections caused by Clostridia (tetanus and botulism). Controlling the environment can be attained by draining the pus, surgical debriding of necrotic tissue, improving blood circulation, alleviating any obstruction and by improving tissue oxygenation. Therapy with hyperbaric oxygen (HBO) may also be useful. The main goal of antimicrobials is in restricting the local and systemic spread of the microorganisms.

The available parenteral antimicrobials for most infections are metronidazole, clindamycin, chloramphenicol, cefoxitin, a penicillin (i.e. ticarcillin, ampicillin, piperacillin) and a beta-lactamase inhibitor (i.e. clavulanic acid, sulbactam, tazobactam), and a carbapenem (imipenem, meropenem, doripenem, ertapenem). An antimicrobial effective against Gram-negative enteric bacilli (i.e. aminoglycoside) or an anti-pseudomonal cephalosporin (i.e. cefepime) are generally added to metronidazole, and occasionally cefoxitin when treating intra-abdominal infections to provide coverage for these organisms. Clindamycin should not be used as a single agent as empiric therapy for abdominal infections. Penicillin can be added to metronidazole in treating of intracranial, pulmonary and dental infections to provide coverage against microaerophilic streptococci, and Actinomyces.

Oral agents adequate for polymicrobial oral infections include the combinations of amoxicillin plus clavulanate, clindamycin and metronidazole plus a macrolide. Penicillin can be added to metronidazole in the treating dental and intracranial infections to cover Actinomyces spp., microaerophilic streptococci, and Arachnia spp. A macrolide can be added to metronidazole in treating upper respiratory infections to cover S. aureus and aerobic streptococci. Penicillin can be added to clindamycin to supplement its coverage against Peptostreptococcus spp. and other Gram-positive anaerobic organisms.

Doxycycline is added to most regimens in the treatment of pelvic infections to cover chlamydia and mycoplasma. Penicillin is effective for bacteremia caused by non-beta lactamase producing bacteria. However, other agents should be used for the therapy of bacteremia caused by beta-lactamase producing bacteria.

Because the length of therapy for anaerobic infections is generally longer than for infections due to aerobic and facultative anaerobic bacteria, oral therapy is often substituted for parenteral treatment. The agents available for oral therapy are limited and include amoxicillin plus clavulanate, clindamycin, chloramphenicol and metronidazole.
