= Prevotella =

Scientific classification
- Domain: Bacteria
- Kingdom: Pseudomonadati
- Phylum: Bacteroidota
- Class: Bacteroidia
- Order: Bacteroidales
- Family: Prevotellaceae
- Genus: Prevotella; Shah and Collins 1990

Species
- See text

Synonyms
- Hoylesella Hitch et al. 2023; Leyella Hitch et al. 2023; Segatella Hitch et al. 2023; Xylanibacter Ueki et al. 2006

Genus of bacteria

Prevotella is a genus of anaerobic Gram-negative bacteria. The type species is Prevotella melaninogenica.

Prevotella species are widely distributed across varied ecological habitats, with 61 characterized species spanning both human and other mammalian hosts. In mammals, this genus is notably prevalent in the swine gut microbiome.

In humans, Prevotella species are members of the oral, vaginal, and gut microbiota and are often recovered from anaerobic infections of the respiratory tract. These infections include aspiration pneumonia, lung abscess, pulmonary empyema, and chronic otitis media and sinusitis. They have been isolated from abscesses and burns in the vicinity of the mouth, bites, paronychia, urinary tract infection, brain abscesses, osteomyelitis, and bacteremia associated with upper respiratory tract infections. Prevotella spp. predominate in periodontal disease and periodontal abscesses.

== Role in gut microbiota ==
The human gut is mainly inhabited by two phyla of bacteria, Bacillota and Bacteroidota, the latter mostly dominated by Bacteroides and Prevotella genera. Prevotella and Bacteroides are thought to have had a common ancestor. Formally, the two genera were differentiated in 1990. However classification is ongoing. For example, Bacteroides melaninogenicus has been reclassified and split into Prevotella melaninogenica and Prevotella intermedia. Either Prevotella or Bacteroides dominate the gut and may be antagonistic. Prevotella is more common in non-Westernised populations consuming a plant-rich diet. In Western populations it has been associated with diets rich in fruits and vegetables. Genome analysis of Prevotella copri showed it was deficient in the ability to degrade host glycans and is more genetically equipped for plant glycan degradation. In a study of gut bacteria of children in Burkina Faso, Prevotella made up 53% of the gut bacteria but were absent in age-matched European children.

Long-term diet is reported to be associated with gut microbiome composition: those who eat protein and animal fats have predominantly Bacteroides bacteria, while those who consume more carbohydrates, especially fibre, feature Prevotella species.

Prevotella is associated with gut inflammation. Increased levels of P. copri might contribute to chronic inflammation in HIV patients. Single species isolate P. copri CB7 has been reported to be beneficial or detrimental, depending on context. The genus Prevotella exhibits significant genetic diversity, particularly between species associated with humans and those found in other animals. This diversity is highlighted by distinct evolutionary paths and genome sizes, with ranging base pair sizes and notable variation in G+C content. Human-related Prevotella species tend to group separately from those in animals such as swine and ruminants. In addition to genetic and overall microbiota differences, Prevotella's high genetic diversity makes it difficult to predict their function, which can vary across individuals.

There have also been studies uncovering the role of bacteriophages, including the discovery of megaphages in the large intestine associated with Prevotella, highlighting the potential for these phages to influence microbial populations within the host microbiome.

== Vaginal microbiota ==
Prevotella species may be commensal in the vagina, though increased abundance of Prevotella in vaginal mucosa is associated with bacterial vaginosis. A study of 542 Korean women, including identical and fraternal twins, highlighted that the vaginal microbiota's composition is influenced by menopausal status and bacterial vaginosis, with Lactobacillus and Prevotella being the most inheritable among beneficial and potentially harmful bacteria, respectively. An analysis pinpointed a genetic link between interleukin-5 variants and Prevotella abundance. Additionally, obesity was found to significantly diversify the vaginal microbiota, particularly increasing Prevotella presence. Other environmental factors like hormone therapy, human papillomavirus (HPV) infection can also influence the abundance of Prevotella.

Prevotella bivia produces lipopolysaccharides and ammonia that are part of vaginal mucus. It is also associated with epithelial cytokine production and enhances the growth of other bacterial vaginosis-associated organisms, such as Gardnerella vaginalis. The latter in turn was found to stimulate growth of P. bivia. P. bivia in the vaginal tract triggers an immune response similar to lipopolysaccharides, activating genes involved in the Th17 pathway (IL23A, IL6, IL1A, IL1B) through antigen-presenting cells. This activation leads to the recruitment of Th cells to the inflamed area, important for women's health since the presence of CCR5+ Th cells in the vaginal mucosa could increase HIV transmission risk during bacterial vaginosis.

== Pathogenicity ==
Prevotella intermedia and P. nigrescens are associated with inflammatory periodontal diseases, such as pregnancy gingivitis, acute necrotizing ulcerative gingivitis and adult periodontitis. Together with Porphyromonas gingivalis they are known as black-pigmenting anaerobes. All three require haemin to provide iron for their growth. These species were shown to bind lactoferrin that is released together with the contents of neutrophils during inflammation and bleeding in periodontitis patients. Lactoferrin inhibits the growth of P. gingivalis but not Prevotella. Inorganic iron and iron-binding proteins such as transferrin and lactoferrin do not support the growth of P. intermedia, however hemin–iron-containing compounds which include hemin, human hemoglobin, bovine hemoglobin, and bovine catalase stimulate the growth of P. intermedia. Hemoglobin-binding protein on the cell surface of P. intermedia has been described.

Some studies have linked abnormal levels of Prevotella copri and rheumatoid arthritis.

An overgrowth of Prevotella and a reduction of Lactobacillus correlated with the onset of osteomyelitis in mice. The reduction of Prevotella in model mice led to an increase of Lactobacillus showing a protection effect against osteomyelitis. Thus, changes in the Prevotella microbiota may be related to the development of osteomyelitis.

Approximately 70% and 30% of Prevotella are resistant to penicillin and clindamycin, respectively, while resistance to amoxicillin/clavulanate and metronidazole is reported in less than 10% of the clinical strains responsible for bloodstream infections in humans.

== Species ==
- Prevotella albensis
- Prevotella amnii
- Prevotella bergensis
- Prevotella bivia
- Prevotella brevis
- Prevotella bryantii
- Prevotella buccae
- Prevotella buccalis
- Prevotella copri
- Prevotella dentalis
- Prevotella denticola
- Prevotella disiens
- Prevotella histicola
- Prevotella intermedia
- Prevotella maculosa
- Prevotella marshii
- Prevotella melaninogenica
- Prevotella micans
- Prevotella mizrahii
- Prevotella multiformis
- Prevotella nigrescens
- Prevotella oralis
- Prevotella oris
- Prevotella oulorum
- Prevotella pallens
- Prevotella salivae
- Prevotella stercorea
- Prevotella timonensis
- Prevotella veroralis

== See also ==
- Enterotype
- List of bacterial vaginosis microbiota
