= Prevotellaceae =

Scientific classification
- Domain: Bacteria
- Kingdom: Pseudomonadati
- Phylum: Bacteroidota
- Class: Bacteroidia
- Order: Bacteroidales
- Family: Prevotellaceae; Krieg 2012

Type genus
- Prevotella Shah and Collins 1990

Genera
- Alloprevotella Downes et al. 2013; Hallella Moore and Moore 1994; Hoylesella Hitch et al. 2023; "Ihuprevotella" Ricaboni et al. 2016; Leyella Hitch et al. 2023; "Marseilla" Ricaboni et al. 2016; "Massiliprevotella" Ndongo et al. 2017; "Metaprevotella" Ricaboni et al. 2017; Palleniella Hitch et al. 2023; Paraprevotella Morotomi et al. 2009; Prevotella Shah and Collins 1990; Pseudoprevotella Na et al. 2021; "Prevotellamassilia" Ndongo et al. 2016; Segatella Hitch et al. 2023; Xylanibacter Ueki et al. 2006

Family of bacteria

Prevotellaceae is a family of bacteria from the order Bacteroidales. As a member of the phylum Bacteroidota, its species are gram negative – meaning their outer cell wall contains lipopolysaccharides. Since they are anaerobes, members of Prevotellaceae can live in areas where there is little to no oxygen – such as the guts of mammals.

As of January 2024, Prevotellaceae is split into 10 valid genera: Alloprevotella, Hallella, Hoylesella, Leyella, Palleniella, Paraprevotella, Prevotella, Pseudoprevotella, Segatella, and Xylanibacter. These genera include 69 bacterial species.

The genus Prevotella is known for its role in the human gastrointestinal microbiota. Prevotella species are among the most numerous microbes culturable from the rumen and hind gut of cattle and sheep, where they help the breakdown of protein and carbohydrate foods. They are also present in humans, where they can be opportunistic pathogens. Prevotella, credited interchangeably with Bacteroides melaninogenicus, has been a problem for dentists' patients for years. As a human pathogen known for creating periodontal and tooth problems, Prevotella has long been studied to counteract its pathogenesis.

The presence of Prevotella in the human gastrointestinal tract is inversely correlated with Parkinson's disease.
