= Mycoplasma iguanae =

Scientific classification
- Domain: Bacteria
- Kingdom: Bacillati
- Phylum: Mycoplasmatota
- Class: Mollicutes
- Order: Mycoplasmatales
- Family: Mycoplasmataceae
- Genus: Mycoplasma
- Species: M. iguanae

Binomial name
- Mycoplasma iguanae Brown et al. 2006

Bacteria found in iguanas

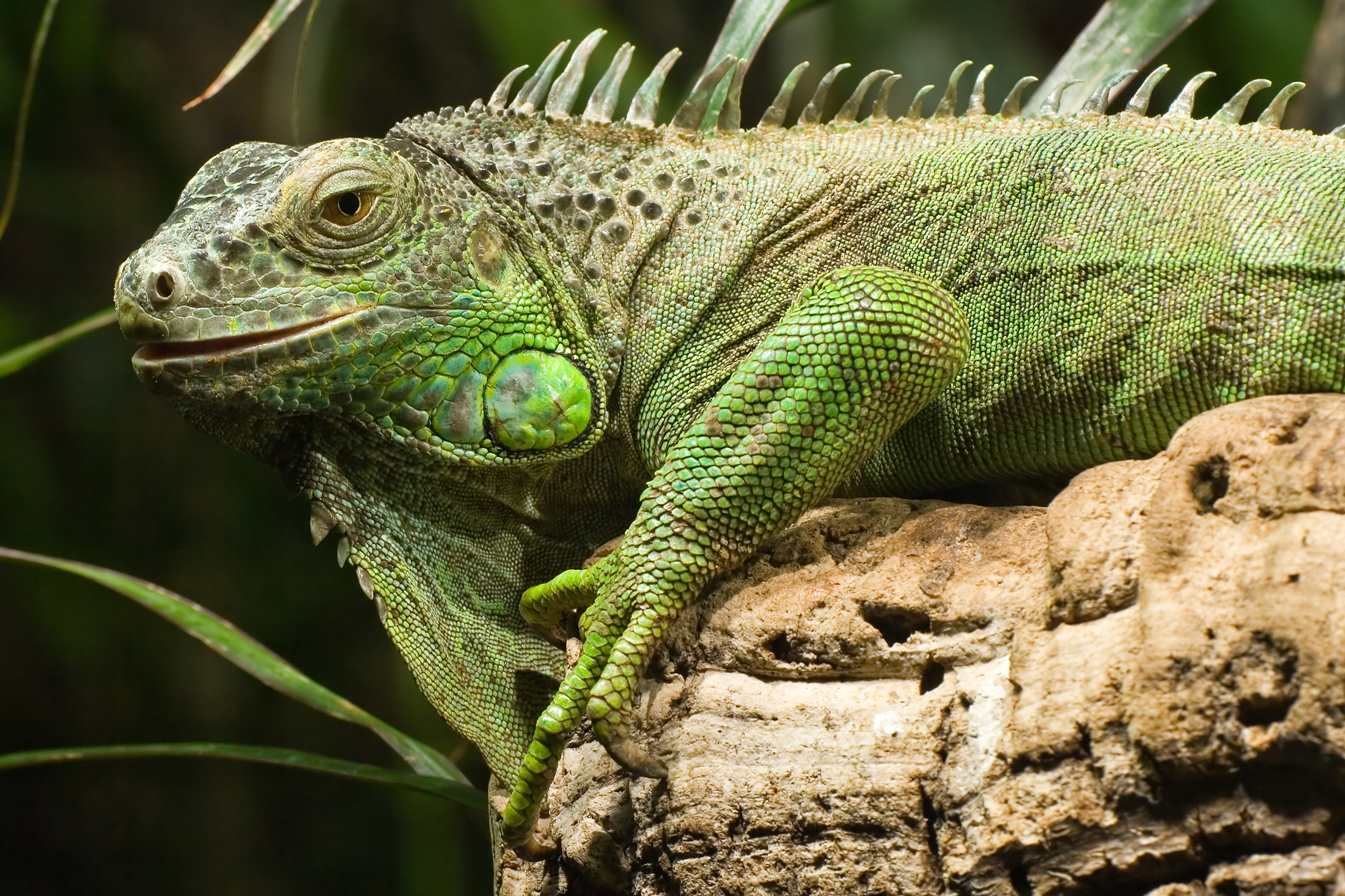
The green iguana, Iguana iguana

Mycoplasma iguanae is a species of bacteria in the genus Mycoplasma.

M. iguanae has been recovered from abscesses of the spine of the green iguana, Iguana iguana.
