= Entomoplasma freundtii =

Scientific classification
- Domain: Bacteria
- Kingdom: Bacillati
- Phylum: Mycoplasmatota
- Class: Mollicutes
- Order: Mycoplasmatales
- Family: Mycoplasmataceae
- Genus: Entomoplasma
- Species: E. freundtii

Binomial name
- Entomoplasma freundtii Tully et al. 1998

Species of bacterium

Entomoplasma freundtii is a mollicute bacteria species that can be isolated from the green tiger beetle (Cicindela campestris, Coleoptera: Cicindelidae).
