= Eperythrozoon muris =

Scientific classification
- Domain: Bacteria
- Kingdom: Bacillati
- Phylum: Mycoplasmatota
- Class: Mollicutes
- Order: Mycoplasmoidales
- Family: Mycoplasmoidaceae
- Genus: Eperythrozoon
- Species: E. muris

Binomial name
- Eperythrozoon muris (Mayer 1921) Gupta et al. 2018

Synonyms
- Haemobartonella muris (Mayer 1921) Tyzzer and Weinman 1939 (Approved Lists 1980); Bartonella muris Mayer 1921; "Ca. Mycoplasma haemomuris" Neimark et al. 2001

Species of bacterium

"Eperythrozoon muris" is a Gram-negative bacillus. It is known to cause anemia in rats and mice.
