= Mycoplasma orale =

Scientific classification
- Domain: Bacteria
- Kingdom: Bacillati
- Phylum: Mycoplasmatota
- Class: Mollicutes
- Order: Mycoplasmatales
- Family: Mycoplasmataceae
- Genus: Mycoplasma
- Species: M. orale

Binomial name
- Mycoplasma orale Taylor-Robinson et al. 1964

Species of bacterium

Mycoplasma orale (also known as Metamycoplasma orale) is a small bacterium found in the class Mollicutes. It belongs to the genus Mycoplasma, a well-known group of bacterial parasites that inhabit humans. It also is known to be an opportunistic pathogen in immunocompromised humans. As with other Mycoplasma species, M. orale is not readily treated with many antibiotics due to its lack of a peptidoglycan cell wall. Therefore, this species is relevant to the medical field as physicians face the task of treating patients infected with this microbe. It is characterized by a small physical size (0.1 micrometer in diameter on average), a small genome size, and a limited metabolism. It is also known to frequently contaminate laboratory experiments. This bacteria is very similar physiologically and morphologically to its sister species within the genus Mycoplasma; however, its recent discovery leaves many questions still unanswered about this microbe.

== Discovery and isolation ==
Taylor-Robinson et al. identified and named M. orale in 1964 after isolating it from the oral cavity of a child at a Washington hospital and three servicemen stationed in North Carolina. Taylor-Robinson et al. cultured the organism under anaerobic conditions on PPLO agar and broth. The resulting colony growth had a "fried egg" appearance when cultured on solid PPLO agar. PPLO is stands for "Pleuropneumonia-like organisms" and was originally designed for growth of parasitic bacteria found in the respiratory tract of cattle; it is now known that these bacteria were Mycoplasma species. PPLO agar is used for isolation and growth of Mycoplasma and Ureaplasma species; it contains beef heart infusion, yeast extract, phenol red, sodium chloride, the antibiotic Polymyxin B, the antifungal Amphotericin B, the antibiotic Penicillin, deionized water, and horse serum. Taylor-Robinson et al. confirmed M. orale was distinct from previously discovered Mycoplasma species with a serological test using haemagglutination of sheep erythrocytes, tannic acid and sonnicated Mycoplasma extracts.

L.G. Tallgren et al. also isolated M. orale in 1974 from a sample of bone marrow taken from a three-year-old boy with Eosinophilic leukaemia. The sample was obtained via a bone marrow biopsy performed at Aurora Hospital in Helsinki, Finland. L.G. Tallgren et al. noted this organism had a typical Mycoplasma "fried egg" appearance when cultured on solid media.

== Taxonomic and phylogenetic classification ==
As determined by 16S rRNA sequencing, M. orale is a bacterium belonging to the genus Mycoplasma. Its closest relative within the genus is M. salivarius, while its most distant is M. mycoides. M. orale and M. salivarius have both been observed in the human oral cavity, evidencing their close proximity in the genus Mycoplasma.

Of the over 100 documented species in the genus Mycoplasma, 14 are known pathogens to humans. This comes as no surprise, as the class Mollicutes contains common commensals or pathogens of several different organisms. Many species in the genus Mycoplasma are commonly found associated with pelvic or genital region infections including M. fermentans and M. hominis. Other species in this genus are the causative agents of respiratory related infections; these species include the well-known Mycoplasma pneumoniae. The family Mycoplastaceae includes the genera Mycoplasma and Ureaplasma. Bacteria in the genus Ureaplasma are known commensals in humans and possess the enzyme Urease (catalyzes urea to carbon dioxide and ammonia). Both Mycoplasma and Ureaplasma species can be grown on the same PPLO medium due to their similarities in metabolism and growth requirement.

== Parasitism and genomics ==
While the genome of M. orale itself has not been fully sequenced, information can be surmised from the sequence data of its close relatives. Members of the genus Mycoplasma are known for their incredibly small genomes, with an average size of 0.6 Mb. This is the smallest discovered self-replicating genome of all known prokaryotes. This significantly reduced genome size is thought to be the result of the taxon's evolution into obligate parasites. Mycoplasma species typically invade and adhere to host cells from which they obtain their nutrients, usually at the expense of the host. All members of this genus, including M. orale, inhabit a wide range of mammalian hosts. Though M. orale usually exists as a commensal in human oral cavities, it is an opputunistic pathogen and will cause illness in human hosts when conditions are right. Due to their small genome size and parasitic lifecycle, they lack many non-essential biosynthetic pathways in their metabolism. These include those for cell wall synthesis as well as purine synthesis. These genomic characteristics make them a good model for the Minimal Genome Concept. Mycoplasma members, including M. orale, also generally have a low G-C content compared to other bacteria. Research has revealed that the 16S rRNA gene of M. orale is about 1,510 bp.

== Growth: metabolism and reproduction ==
As stated previously, M. orale is an obligate parasite found in humans and primates according to the GIDEON Guide of medically relevant bacteria. This evolution into parasitism has resulted in the loss of many functional metabolic pathways. Therefore, these organisms are unable to grow and reproduce in culture without the necessary nutrients and metabolites present in media. M. orale is cultured using a special medium, the 1076b. SP4-Z MEDIUM. This medium contains either glucose or arginine (but not both at the same time) as a carbon source; however, it does not contain yeast extract. For exact information regarding all components of this medium see "DSMZ Medium" in External links. It is considered to be a mesophilic bacteria growing best at a temperature of 37 °C. This is expected, as theoretically it should grow best at the basal temperatures of its host. This organism was also found to grow optimally at pH 6.0 and had phosphatase activity at .2 Ual/Mg of protein. Unlike other Mycoplasmas, M. orale does not have the ability to ferment glucose. It is also unable to aerobically reduce 2-3-5 triphenyl tetrazolium. This demonstrated its close phylogenetic relationship to other Mycoplasma species which inhabit human hosts. M. orale was observed to divide in two ways: by either binary fission or by forming mycelial filaments in colonies. Binary fission was observed deeper within colony growth while mycelial growth was found to occur more toward the air interface. Thus, it was inferred that mycelial growth is associated with aerobic conditions, while growth by binary fission is associated with a more anaerobic environment.

== Medical relevance ==
Mycoplasma orale is considered to be a non-pathogenic commensal, especially in immunocompetent individuals. However, abscesses containing M. orale have been noted in patients who are immunocompromised. A study was conducted on bacterial samples taken from a 33-year-old immunocompromised male. This individual presented with fever, increased weight loss, and shoulder pain among other pathologies. Samples were obtained from the patient and grown on media for testing. 16S rRNA sequencing was completed and revealed the culprit of the infection, M. orale. This revealed the ability of this organism to cause pathology in humans. Infections with Mycoplasma members, including M. orale, can be difficult to treat with antibiotics due to their lack of a cell wall. This lack of peptidoglycan confers resistance to any antibiotics that may target its synthesis, including the commonly used penicillin and its derivatives as well as vancomycin. This presents a challenge to physicians as they try to treat their patients with bacterial Mycoplasma infections.

== Lab contamination ==
Mycoplama species are commonly found in labs as contaminants. Beginning in 1956 through the early 2000s, various organizations including Johns Hopkins, US Food and Drug Administration and the Deutsche Sammlung von Mikroorganismen und Zellkulturen (DSMZ) in Germany, among others, have reported varying degrees of Mycoplasma contamination ranging from 15%-70% of cell cultures. Mycoplasma contaminations are problematic because they are difficult to prevent and negatively impact host cell growth. Contamination is common due to their small physical size, lack of cell wall, and pleomorphism. Pleomorphism is defined as an organism's ability to modify their shape and size as a response to changes in their environment. Pleomorphism in Mycoplasma species allows bypassing of typical membrane filtration systems. As previous stated, their lack of a cell wall prevents the use of antibiotics to inhibit unwanted cell growth on cultured media. In addition to culture contamination, Mycoplasma contaminating cell cultures can have a negative effect on host cell growth by stealing nutrients from host cells. M. orale has been found to inhibit host cell growth by outcompeting the host cell for arginine. It is important to prevent contamination of Mycoplasma for reliable and accurate laboratory research results.
