= Mycoplasma incognitus =

Scientific classification
- Domain: Bacteria
- Kingdom: Bacillati
- Phylum: Mycoplasmatota
- Class: Mollicutes
- Order: Mycoplasmatales
- Family: Mycoplasmataceae
- Genus: Mycoplasma
- Species: M. incognitus

Binomial name
- Mycoplasma incognitus Lo et al. 1989

Species of bacterium

Mycoplasma incognitus is a human invasive Mycoplasma type bacteria, as well as a disease agent that can cause a variety of different diseases. M. incognitus is an immunomodulatory agent, which means that it can weaken the immune response by decreasing the ability of the immune system to produce antibodies. This mycoplasma is highly contagious, and can be passed from person to person via bodily fluids, such as sweat and blood. Since M. incognitus is a mycoplasma, it does not have a cell wall, which means that it is naturally immune to many different antibiotics, such as penicillin or other antibiotics that target the cell wall. This new mycoplasma, however, was later determined to be a close form of Mycoplasma fermentans, although it does differ.

== Genome ==
Mycoplasma incognitus acts as a parasite, and gains most of its nutrients from its host because it has a very small genome, consisting of only the genes essential for life. It is estimated that M. incognitus has fewer than 500 genes.

== Cell structure ==
There have been frequent unsuccessful attempts at isolating a culture of M. incognitus because it is more fastidious in cultivation requirements than other mycoplasmas. It is known that the most frequently colonized sites are epithelial cell surfaces and red and white blood cells inside of the human body.

== Obtention of energy and metabolism ==
Scientists have found that M. incognitus can utilize glucose both aerobically and anaerobically, but prefers to utilize the alternate energy source: fructose. The metabolism of sugars may play an important role in the pathological process of infection, but scientists are not sure how yet. M. incognitus can metabolize arginine, and scientists believe that it is possible that mycoplasmas that utilize arginine may be more pathogenic than those that don't.

== Ecology ==
Mycoplasma incognitus cannot survive unless it is inside a host. Because of this, M. incognitus is also considered by some to be a rickettsia type bacteria, but because it had more traits of a mycoplasma, they stuck with the final name of Mycoplasma incognitus.

== Pathology ==
This mycoplasma acts by entering into the individual cells of the body where it can lie dormant for 10, 20, or 30 years. If the host experiences a severe injury or a vaccination isn't successful, M. incognitus can become triggered and start invading and destroying certain cells. M. incognitus has the ability to alter red blood cells so that they swell and therefore cannot be compressed and passed through the capillaries.
