= Mycoplasma ovipneumoniae =

Scientific classification
- Domain: Bacteria
- Kingdom: Bacillati
- Phylum: Mycoplasmatota
- Class: Mollicutes
- Order: Mycoplasmatales
- Family: Mycoplasmataceae
- Genus: Mycoplasma
- Species: M. ovipneumoniae

Binomial name
- Mycoplasma ovipneumoniae Carmichael et al. 1972 (Approved Lists 1980)

Species of bacterium

Mycoplasma ovipneumoniae is a species of Mycoplasma bacteria that most commonly inhabits and affects ruminant animals, first described from isolates in domestic sheep from Australia in 1972. M. ovipneumoniae contributes to harmful pneumonia in sheep and goats. The duration and severity of M. ovipneumoniae varies from region to region.

== Affected populations ==
M. ovipneumoniae is a respiratory pathogen of domestic sheep, domestic goats, bighorn sheep, auodad, mountain goats, and other Caprinae and can cause both primary atypical pneumonia and also predispose infected animals to secondary pneumonia with other agents, including Mannheimia haemolytica. Recent studies have identified the bacterium in other animals outside of the Caprinae subfamily. M. ovipneumoniae has been detected in bighorn sheep, caribou, mountain goats, beira antelope, Dall sheep, muskoxen, mule deer, white-tailed deer, and domestic cattle, sheep and goats.

== Characteristics ==
Several mechanisms are involved in the pathogenicity of M. ovipneumoniae, including altering macrophage activity, adhering to the ruminants' ciliated epithelium via its polysaccharide capsule, inducing the production of autoantibodies to ciliary antigens, and suppressive activity on lymphocytes, all of which are important factors that contribute to the disease in sheep and other small ruminants. The bacterium also has the ability to act as a predisposing factor for other bacterial and viral infections. Populations of M. ovipneumoniae of infected sheep are often found to have varying strains of the bacterium within one animal, but the different strains vary in virulence. The bacterium can be found within the lungs, trachea, and nasal cavity of small ruminants. M. ovipneumoniae paralyzes cilia in the airways of the infected animal which doesn't allow them to push out the pneumonia-causing bacteria that has entered the lungs. A combination of this with other environmental factors can cause respiratory disease and increased mortality rates in infected individuals.

== Transmission and impacts on susceptible populations ==
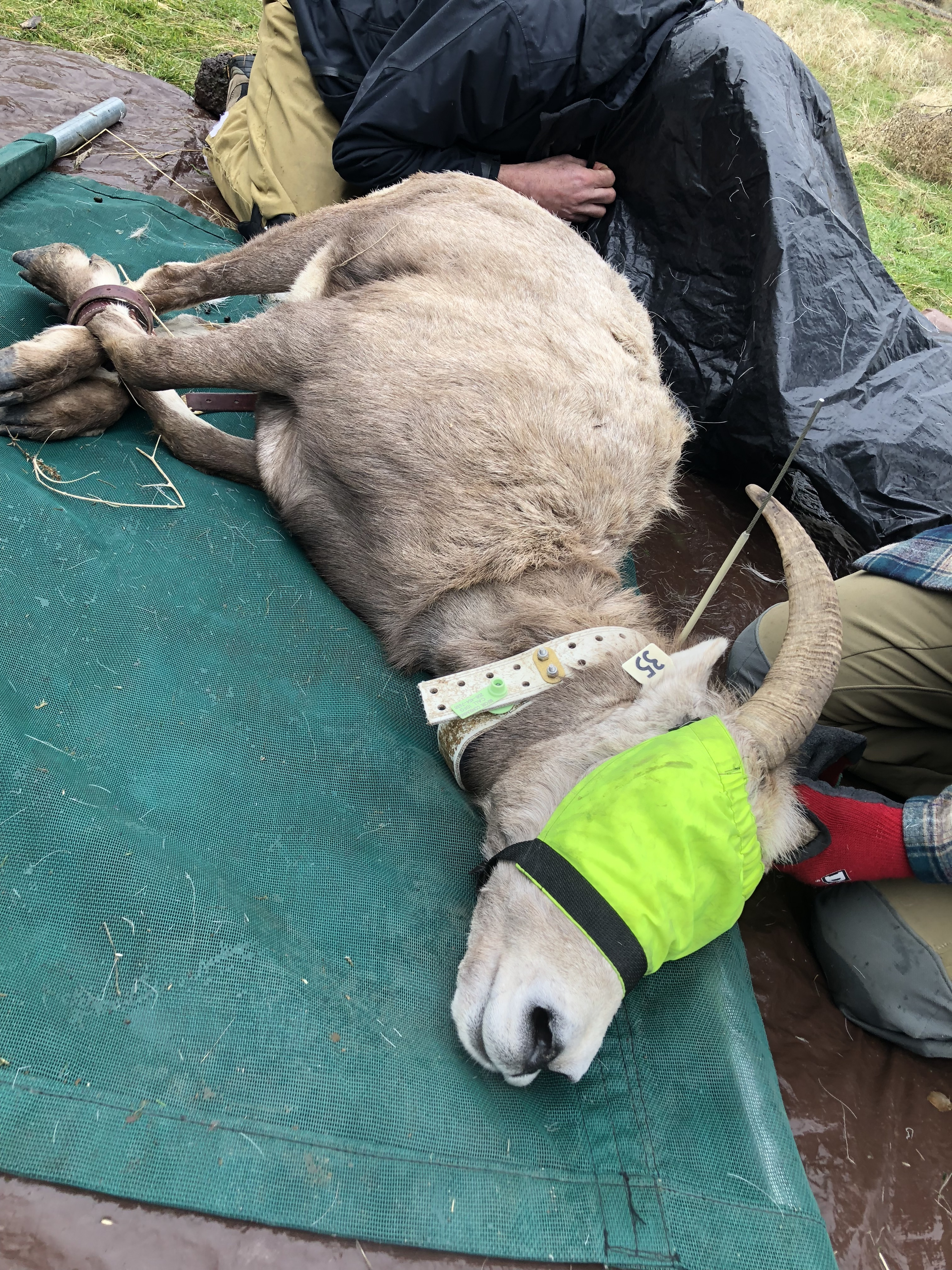
Bighorn sheep tagging after Mycoplasma ovipneumoniae testing

=== Transmission ===
In July 2007, this species of Mycoplasma was linked to the deaths of bighorn sheep in the Western United States. M. ovipneumoniae is also a predominant bacterium associated with broncopneumonia lesions in free-ranging bighorn lambs. Introductions come from either domestic sheep and goats (which harbour M. ovipneumoniae with limited morbidity), or through contact with other infected bighorn sheep which survived initial infection events to become long-term chronic carriers. Transmission comes from animal secretions or respiratory droplets. There have been a minimum of thirteen studies where bighorns and domestic sheep were penned together, resulting in 98% bighorn mortality rates. Domestic sheep and goats that are infected with M. ovipneumoniae come into contact with healthy bighorn sheep can transmit the bacteria to bighorn sheep and cause large population die-offs.

=== Declining population rates ===
Once a bighorn population is infected with M. ovipneumoniae, the pathogen is difficult to eliminate, and is associated with stagnant-to-declining population growth rates. M. ovipneumoniae is also associated with population declines in several other wild caprinae, including the Norwegian muskox. Mycoplasma species are labile organisms which are easily destroyed by heat, dehydration, sunlight, and common disinfectants, so they do not survive for a long time outside the body of the animal. As of 2022, and with many Mycoplasma diseases, no commercially available animal vaccine is available for M. ovipneumoniae.

Biologists deduced that the greatest limiting factor for bighorn sheep populations is the deadly disease caused by contact with domestic sheep and goats. Domestic sheep are seemingly unaffected by M. ovipneumoniae and to compound the problems in bighorn sheep, lamb survival can remain dangerously low for decades after an outbreak. Adult bighorns that survive become carriers and pass the disease onto the young lambs.

== Symptoms, testing and prevention ==
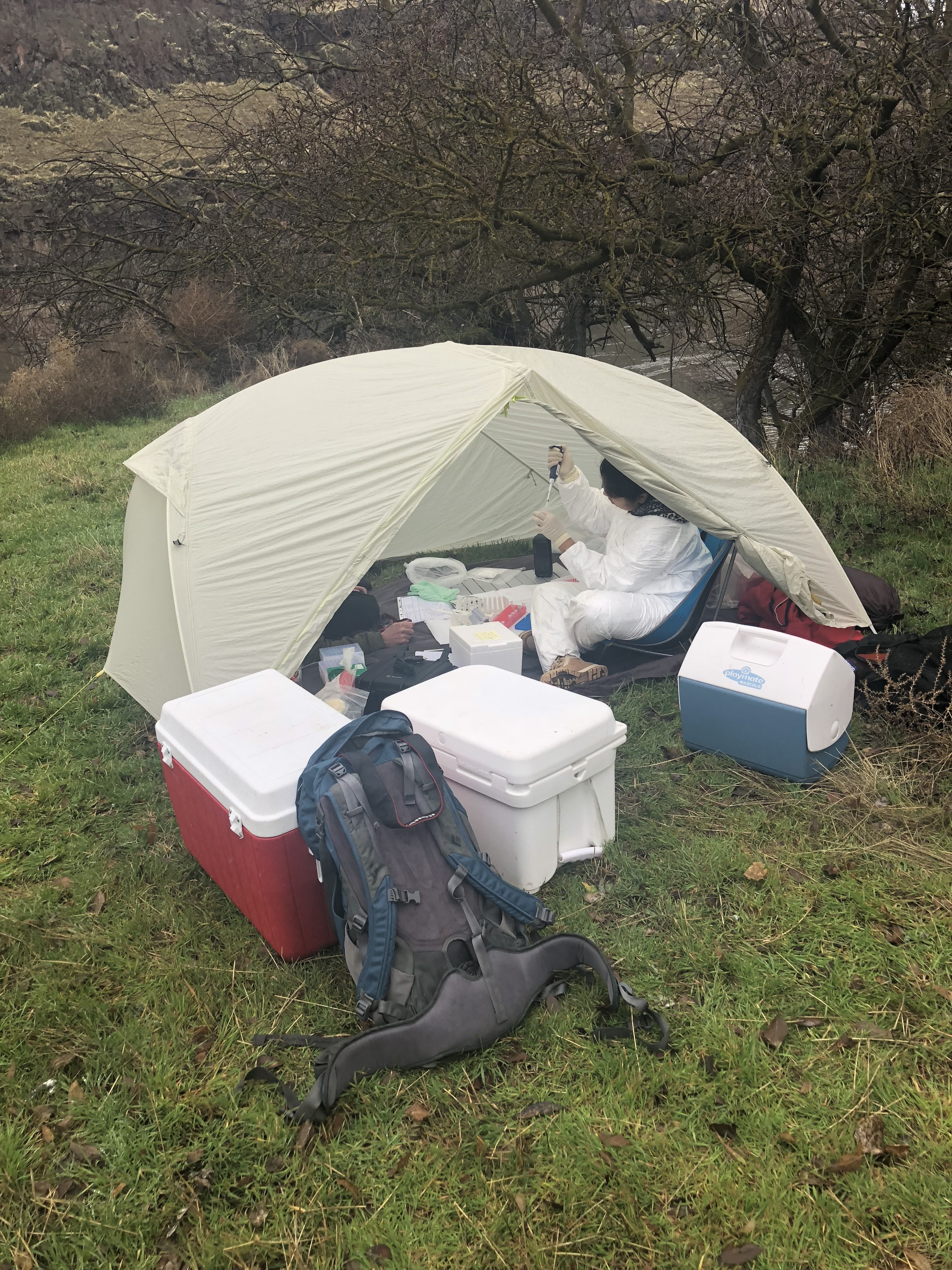
On-site testing for Mycoplasma ovipneumoniae in Hells Canyon

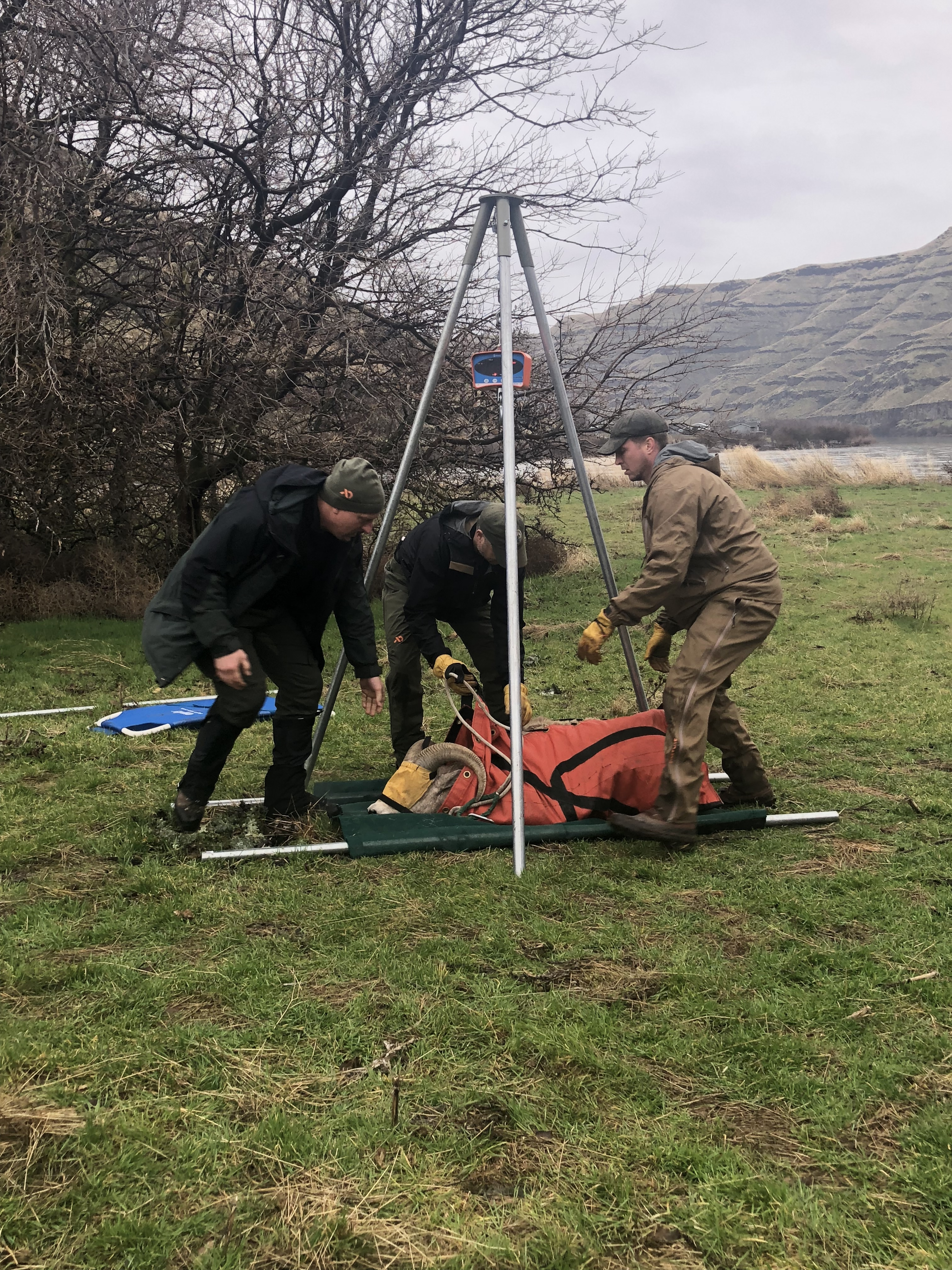
Bighorn sheep capture in Hells Canyon for Mycoplasma ovipneumoniae testing

=== Symptoms ===
The symptoms of M. ovipneumoniae vary between domestic and bighorn sheep, as well as other Caprinae. Symptoms in domestic sheep can range from mild respiratory disease, severe pneumonia and even death. Clinical and subclinical symptoms may be present in domestic sheep. Clinical symptoms may include fever, lethargy, decreased appetite, nasal discharge, coughing, and decreased milk production in ewes. Subtle and often unnoticeable clinical symptoms are present until severe damage associated with secondary bacterial infection sets in. Clinical signs such as fever, lethargy, head shaking, coughing, nasal discharge, and sudden death are common in bighorn sheep possessing M. ovipneumoniae.

=== Testing options ===
There are multiple different options for testing Caprinae for M. ovipneumoniae such as antibody-based tests, DNA based tests, and bacteria cultures. Polymerase chain reaction (PCR) detection of M. ovipneumoniae, indirect hemagglutination (IH), and competitive enzyme-linked immunosorbent assay (cELISA) detection of exposure to M. ovipneumoniae all exist as options. The detection of M. ovipneumoniae can be obtained by bacteriologic culture, molecular diagnostics, and serology, allowing for the bacterium to be grown in culture, species-specific DNA sequences, and specific antibodies identified, respectively. If antibodies are present after testing, this indicates that the tested animal has at some point been exposed to M. ovipneumoniae bacteria, but does not establish alone that the individual is currently infected.

=== Preventative measures ===
Although there are no current vaccine options available to prevent M. ovipneumoniae, the best preventative measure for the disease is keeping wild free-ranging sheep out of contact with domestic sheep and goats. Preliminary research shows that having M. ovipneumoniae–free domestic sheep and goats could be not only be beneficial to bighorns, but to domestic sheep producers as well. Domestic lambs, that are M. ovipneumoniae free, experience higher daily gains and better carcass traits, which would lead to higher profits for producers and fewer die-offs in bighorn sheep populations.
