= Mycoplasma pneumoniae =

Scientific classification
- Domain: Bacteria
- Kingdom: Bacillati
- Phylum: Mycoplasmatota
- Class: Mollicutes
- Order: Mycoplasmoidales
- Family: Mycoplasmoidaceae
- Genus: Mycoplasmoides
- Species: M. pneumoniae

Binomial name
- Mycoplasmoides pneumoniae (Somerson et al.) Gupta et al. 2018

Synonyms
- Mycoplasma pneumoniae Somerson et al., 1963

Species of bacterium

Mycoplasma pneumoniae is a species of very small-cell bacteria that lack a cell wall, in the class Mollicutes. M. pneumoniae is a human pathogen that causes the disease Mycoplasma pneumonia, a form of atypical bacterial pneumonia related to cold agglutinin disease.

It is one of the smallest self-replicating organisms and its discovery traces back to 1898 when Nocard and Roux isolated a microorganism linked to cattle pneumonia. This microbe shared characteristics with pleuropneumonia-like organisms (PPLOs), which were soon linked to pneumonias and arthritis in several animals. A significant development occurred in 1944 when Monroe Eaton cultivated an agent thought responsible for human pneumonia in embryonated chicken eggs, referred to as the "Eaton agent." This agent was classified as a bacteria due to its cultivation method and because antibiotics were effective in treating the infection, questioning its viral nature. In 1961, a researcher named Robert Chanock, collaborating with Leonard Hayflick, revisited the Eaton agent and posited it could be a mycoplasma, a hypothesis confirmed by Hayflick's isolation of a unique mycoplasma, later named Mycoplasma pneumoniae. Hayflick's discovery proved M. pneumoniae was responsible for causing human pneumonia.

Taxonomically, Mycoplasma pneumoniae is part of the Mollicutes class, characterized by their lack of a peptidoglycan cell wall, making them inherently resistant to antibiotics targeting cell wall synthesis, such as beta-lactams. With a reduced genome and metabolic simplicity, mycoplasmas are obligate parasites with limited metabolic pathways, relying heavily on host resources. This bacterium uses a specialized attachment organelle to adhere to respiratory tract cells, facilitating motility and cell invasion. The persistence of M. pneumoniae infections even after treatment is associated with its ability to mimic host cell surface composition.

Pathogenic mechanisms of M. pneumoniae involve host cell adhesion and cytotoxic effects, including cilia loss and hydrogen peroxide release, which lead to respiratory symptoms and complications such as bronchial asthma and chronic obstructive pulmonary disease. Additionally, the bacterium produces a unique CARDS toxin, contributing to inflammation and respiratory distress. Treatment of M. pneumoniae infections typically involves macrolides or tetracyclines, as these antibiotics inhibit protein synthesis, though resistance has been increasing, particularly in Asia. This resistance predominantly arises from mutations in the 23S rRNA gene, which interfere with macrolide binding, complicating management and necessitating alternative treatment strategies.

== Discovery and history ==
In 1898, Nocard and Roux isolated an agent assumed to be the cause of cattle pneumonia and named it microbe de la peripneumonie Microorganisms from other sources, having properties similar to the pleuropneumonia organism (PPO) of cattle, soon came to be known as pleuropneumonia-like organisms (PPLO), but their true nature remained unknown. Many PPLO were later proven to be the cause of pneumonias and arthritis in several lower animals.

In 1944, Monroe Eaton used embryonated chicken eggs to cultivate an agent thought to be the cause of human primary atypical pneumonia (PAP), commonly known as "walking pneumonia." This unknown organism became known as the "Eaton agent". At that time, Eaton's use of embryonated eggs, then used for cultivating viruses, supported the idea that the Eaton agent was a virus. Yet it was known that PAP was amenable to treatment with broad-spectrum antibiotics, making a viral etiology suspect.

Robert Chanock, a researcher from the NIH who was studying the Eaton agent as a virus, visited the Wistar Institute in Philadelphia in 1961 to obtain a cell culture of a normal human cell strain developed by Leonard Hayflick. This cell strain was known to be exquisitely sensitive to isolate and grow human viruses. Chanock told Hayflick of his research on the Eaton agent, and his belief that its viral nature was questionable. Although Hayflick knew little about the current research on this agent, his doctoral dissertation had been done on animal diseases caused by PPLO. Hayflick knew that many lower animals suffered from pneumonias caused by PPLOs (later to be termed mycoplasmas). Hayflick reasoned that the Eaton agent might be a mycoplasma, and not a virus. Chanock had never heard of mycoplasmas, and at Hayflick's request sent him egg yolk containing the Eaton agent.

Using a novel agar and fluid medium formulation he had devised, Hayflick isolated a unique mycoplasma from the egg yolk. This was soon proven by Chanock and Hayflick to be the causative agent of PAP. When this discovery became known to Emmy Klieneberger-Nobel of the Lister Institute in London, the world's leading authority on these organisms, she suggested that the organism be named Mycoplasma hayflickiae. Hayflick demurred in favor of Mycoplasma pneumoniae.

This smallest free-living microorganism was the first to be isolated and proven to be the cause of a human disease. For his discovery, Hayflick was presented with the Presidential Award by the International Organization of Mycoplasmology. The inverted microscope under which Hayflick discovered Mycoplasma pneumoniae is kept by the Smithsonian Institution.

== Taxonomy and classification ==
The term mycoplasma (mykes meaning fungus, and plasma, meaning formed) is derived from the fungal-like growth of some mycoplasma species. The mycoplasmas were classified as Mollicutes ("mollis", meaning soft and "cutis", meaning skin) in 1960 due to their small size and genome, lack of cell wall, low G+C content and unusual nutritional needs.

Mycoplasmas, which are among the smallest self-replicating organisms, are parasitic species that lack a cell wall and periplasmic space, have reduced genomes, and limited metabolic activity. M. pneumoniae has also been designated as an arginine nonfermenting species. Mycoplasmas are further classified by the sequence composition of 16s rRNA. All mycoplasmas of the pneumoniae group possess similar 16s rRNA variations unique to the group, of which M. pneumoniae has a 6.3% variation in the conserved regions, that suggest mycoplasmas formed by degenerative evolution from the gram-positive eubacterial group that includes bacilli, streptococci, and lactobacilli. M. pneumoniae is a member of the family Mycoplasmataceae and order Mycoplasmatales.

== Cell biology ==
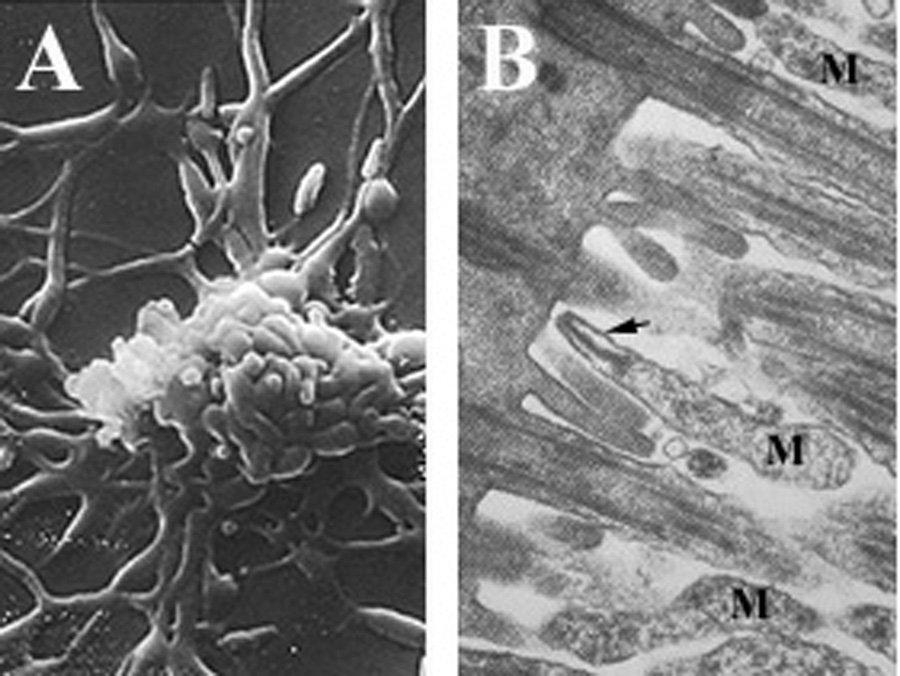
A) Filamentous Mycoplasma pneumoniae cells B) M. pneumoniae cells (M) attached to ciliated mucosal cells by the attachment organelle (indicated by arrow)

Mycoplasma pneumoniae cells have an elongated shape that is approximately 0.1–0.2 μm (100–200 nm) in width and 1–2 μm (1000–2000 nm) in length. The extremely small cell size means they are incapable of being examined by light microscopy; a stereomicroscope is required for viewing the morphology of M. pneumoniae colonies, which are usually less than 100 μm in length. The inability to synthesize a peptidoglycan cell wall is due to the absence of genes encoding its formation and results in an increased importance in maintenance of osmotic stability to avoid desiccation. The lack of a cell wall also calls for increased support of the cell membrane(reinforced with sterols), which includes a rigid cytoskeleton composed of an intricate protein network and, potentially, an extracellular capsule to facilitate adherence to the host cell. M. pneumoniae are the only bacterial cells that possess cholesterol in their cell membrane (obtained from the host) and possess more genes that encode for membrane lipoprotein variations than other mycoplasmas, which are thought to be associated with its parasitic lifestyle. M. pneumoniae cells also possess an attachment organelle, which is used in the gliding motility of the organism by an unknown mechanism.

=== Genomics and metabolic reconstruction ===
Sequencing of the M. pneumoniae genome in 1996 revealed it is 816,394 bp in size. The genome contains 687 genes that encode for proteins, of which about 56.6% code for essential metabolic enzymes; notably those involved in glycolysis and organic acid fermentation. M. pneumoniae is consequently very susceptible to loss of enzymatic function by gene mutations, as the only buffering systems against functional loss by point mutations are for maintenance of the pentose phosphate pathway and nucleotide metabolism. Loss of function in other pathways is suggested to be compensated by host cell metabolism. In addition to the potential for loss of pathway function, the reduced genome of M. pneumoniae outright lacks a number of pathways, including the TCA cycle, respiratory electron transport chain, and biosynthesis pathways for amino acids, fatty acids, cholesterol and purines and pyrimidines. These limitations make M. pneumoniae dependent upon import systems to acquire essential building blocks from their host or the environment that cannot be obtained through glycolytic pathways. Along with energy costly protein and RNA production, a large portion of energy metabolism is exerted to maintain proton gradients (up to 80%) due to the high surface area to volume ratio of M. pneumoniae cells. Only 12 – 29% of energy metabolism is directed at cell growth, which is unusually low for bacterial cells, and is thought to be an adaptation of its parasitic lifestyle.

Unlike other bacteria, M. pneumoniae uses the codon UGA to code for tryptophan rather than using it as a stop codon.

=== Comparative metabolomics ===
Mycoplasma pneumoniae has a reduced metabolome in comparison to other bacterial species. This means that the pathogen has fewer metabolic reactions in comparison to other bacterial species such as B.subtilis and Escherichia coli.

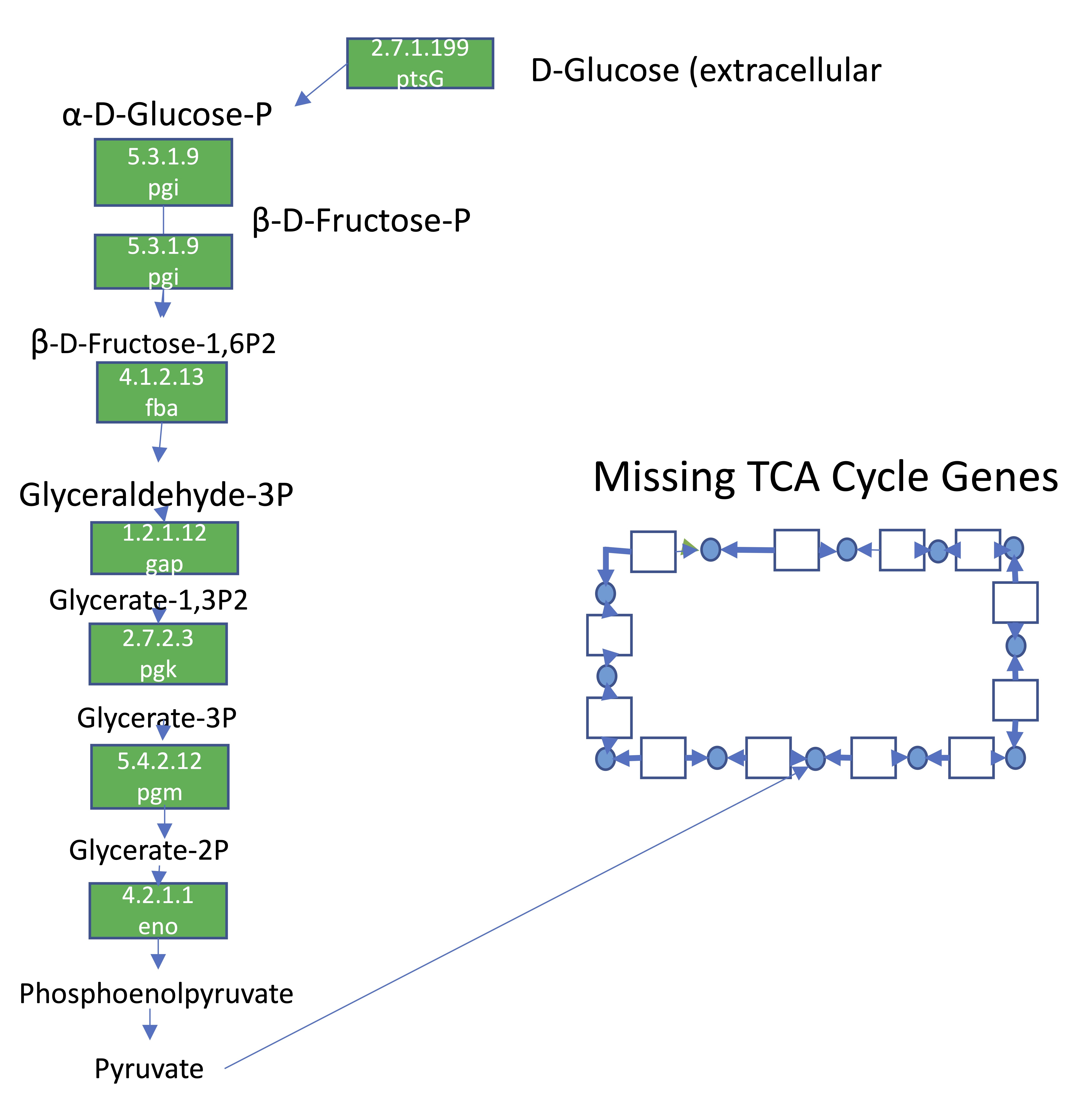
Metabolic pathway map depicting the enzymes of glycolysis in Mycoplasma pneumoniae.Green boxes signify enzymes that are present in the pathway. The white boxes symbolize missing enzymes. Enzymes of the TCA cycle are missing in M. pneumoniae. The complete pathway can be found at KEGG.

Since Mycoplasma pneumoniae has a reduced genome, it has a smaller number of overall paths and metabolic enzymes, which contributes to its more linear metabolome. A linear metabolome causes Mycoplasma pneumoniae to be less adaptable to external factors. Additionally, since Mycoplasma pneumoniae has a reduced genome, the majority of its metabolic enzymes are essential. This is in contrast to another model organism, Escherichia coli, in which only 15% of its metabolic enzymes are essential. In summary, the linear topology of Mycoplasma pneumoniae's metabolome leads to reduced efficiency in its metabolic reactions, but still maintains similar levels of metabolite concentrations, cellular energetics, adaptability, and global gene expression.

Species	M. pneumoniae	L. lactis	B. subtilis	E. coli
Mean # Of Paths	8.17	5.37	7.54	6.12

The table above depicts the mean path length for the metabolomes of M. pneumoniae, E. coli, L. lactis, and B. subtilis. This number describes, essentially, the mean number of reactions that occur in the metabolome. Mycoplasma pneumoniae, on average, has a high number of reactions per path within its metabolome in comparison to other model bacterial species.

One effect of Mycoplasma pneumoniae's unique metabolome is its longer duplication time. It takes the pathogen significantly more time to duplicate on average compared to other model organism bacteria. This may be due to the fact that Mycoplasma pneumoniae's metabolome is less efficient than that of Escherichia coli.

The metabolome of Mycoplasma pneumoniae can also be informative in analyzing its pathogenesis. Extensive study of the metabolic network of this organism has led to the identification of biomarkers that can potentially reveal the presence of the extensive complications the bacteria can cause. Metabolomics is increasingly being used as a useful tool for the verification of biomarkers of infectious pathogens.

== Pathogenicity ==
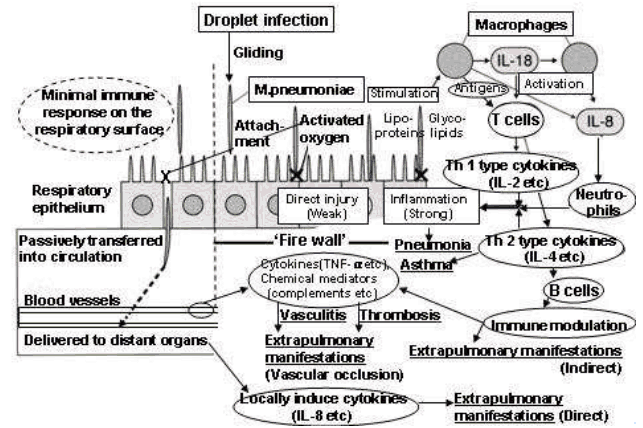
Pathogenicity of Mycoplasma pneumoniae in vasculitic/thrombotic disorders

Mycoplasma pneumoniae parasitizes the respiratory tract epithelium of humans. Adherence to the respiratory epithelial cells is thought to occur via the attachment organelle, followed by evasion of host immune system by intracellular localization and adjustment of the cell membrane composition to mimic the host cell membrane. Mycoplasma pneumoniae grows exclusively by parasitizing mammals. Reproduction, therefore, is dependent upon attachment to a host cell. According to Waites and Talkington, specialized reproduction occurs by "binary fission, temporally linked with duplication of its attachment organelle, which migrates to the opposite pole of the cell during replication and before nucleoid separation". Mutations that affect the formation of the attachment organelle not only hinder motility and cell division, but also reduce the ability of M. pneumoniae cells to adhere to the host cell.

=== Cytoadherence ===
Adherence of M. pneumoniae to a host cell (usually a respiratory tract cell, but occasionally an erythrocyte or urogenital lining cell) is the initiating event for pneumonic disease and related symptoms. The specialized attachment organelle is a polar, electron dense and elongated cell extension that facilitates motility and adherence to host cells. It is composed of a central filament surrounded by an intracytoplasmic space, along with a number of adhesins and structural and accessory proteins localized at the tip of the organelle. A variety of proteins are known to contribute to the formation and functionality of the attachment organelle, including the accessory proteins HMW1–HMW5, P30, P56, and P90 that confer structure and adhesin support, and P1, P30 and P116 which are involved directly in attachment. This network of proteins participates not only in the initiation of attachment organelle formation and adhesion but also in motility. The P1 adhesin (trypsin-sensitive protein) is a 120 kDa protein highly clustered on the surface of the attachment organelle tip in virulent mycoplasmas. Both the presence of P1 and its concentration on the cell surface are required for the attachment of M. pneumoniae to the host cell. M. pneumoniae cells treated with monoclonal antibodies specific to the immunogenic C-terminus of the P1 adhesin have been shown to be inhibited in their ability to attach to the host cell surface by approximately 75%, suggesting P1 is a major component in adherence. These antibodies also decreased the ability of the cell to glide quickly, which may contribute to decreased adherence to the host by hindering their capacity to locate a host cell. Furthermore, mutations in P1 or degradation by trypsin treatment yield avirulent M. pneumoniae cells. Loss of proteins in the cytoskeleton involved in the localization of P1 in the tip structure, such as HMW1–HMW3, also cause avirulence due to the lack of adhesin clustering. Another protein considered to play an important role in adherence is P30, as M. pneumoniae cells with mutations in this protein or that have had antibodies raised against P30 are incapable of adhering to host cells. P30 is not involved in the localization of P1 in the tip structure since P1 is trafficked to the attachment organelle in P30 mutants, but rather it may function as a receptor-binding accessory adhesin. P30 mutants also display distinct morphological features such as multiple lobes and a rounded shape as opposed to elongated, which suggests P30 may interact with the cytoskeleton during formation of the attachment organelle. A number of eukaryotic cell surface components have been implicated in the adherence of M. pneumoniae cells to the respiratory tract epithelium. Among them are sialoglycoconjugates, sulfated glycolipids, glycoproteins, fibronectin, and neuraminic acid receptors. Lectins on the surface of the bacterial cells are capable of binding oligosaccharide chains on glycolipids and glycoproteins to facilitate attachment, in addition to the proteins TU and pyruvate dehydrogenase E1 β, which bind to fibronectin.

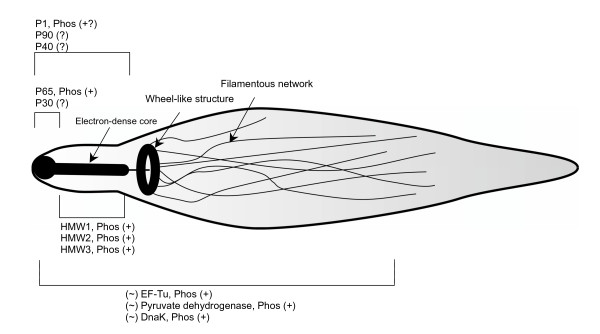
Schematic of the phosphorylated proteins in the attachment organelle of Mycoplasma pneumoniae

=== Intracellular localization ===
Mycoplasma pneumoniae fuses with host cells and survive intracellularly. Thus it can evade host immune system detection, resist antibiotic treatment, and cross mucosal barriers,. In addition to the close physical proximity of M. pneumoniae and host cells, the lack of cell wall and peculiar cell membrane components, like cholesterol, may facilitate fusion. Internal localization may produce chronic or latent infections as M. pneumoniae is capable of persisting, synthesizing DNA, and replicating within the host cell even after treatment with antibiotics. The exact mechanism of intracellular localization is unknown, however the potential for cytoplasmic sequestration within the host explains the difficulty in completely eliminating M. pneumoniae infections in afflicted individuals.

=== Immune response ===
In addition to evasion of host immune system by intracellular localization, M. pneumoniae can change the composition of its cell membrane to mimic the host cell membrane and avoid detection by immune system cells. M. pneumoniae cells possess a number of protein and glycolipid antigens that elicit immune responses, but variation of these surface antigens would allow the infection to persist long enough for M. pneumoniae cells to fuse with host cells and escape detection. The similarity between the compositions of M. pneumoniae and human cell membranes can also result in autoimmune responses in several organs and tissues.

=== Cytotoxicity and organismal effects ===
The main cytotoxic effect of M. pneumoniae is local disruption of tissue and cell structure along the respiratory tract epithelium due to its attachment to host cells. Attachment of the bacteria to host cells can result in loss of cilia, a reduction in metabolism, biosynthesis, and import of macromolecules, and, eventually, infected cells may be shed from the epithelial lining. Local damage may also be a result of lactoferrin acquisition and subsequent hydroxyl radical, superoxide anion and peroxide formation.

Secondly, M. pneumoniae produces a unique virulence factor known as Community Acquired Respiratory Distress Syndrome (CARDS) toxin. The CARDS toxin most likely aids in the colonization and pathogenic pathways of M. pneumoniae, leading to inflammation and airway dysfunction.

The third virulence factor is the formation of hydrogen peroxide in M. pneumoniae infections. When M. pneumoniae is attached to erythrocytes, hydrogen peroxide diffuses from the bacteria to the host cell without it being detoxified by catalase or peroxidase, thus injuring the host cell by reducing glutathione, damaging lipid membranes and causing protein denaturation, i.e. oxidation of heme and hemolysis.

Most recently it was shown that hydrogen peroxide plays a minor if any role in haemolysis, but that hydrogen sulfide is the true culprit.

The cytotoxic effects of M. pneumoniae infections translate into common symptoms like coughing and lung irritation that may persist for months after infection has subsided. Local inflammation and hyperresponsiveness by infection induced cytokine production has been associated with chronic conditions such as bronchial asthma and has also been linked to progression of symptoms in individuals with cystic fibrosis and COPD.

== Antimicrobial activity ==
Infections can be treated with antibiotics from the macrolide, fluoroquinolone, or tetracycline classes. Beta-lactam antibiotics, like penicillin and amoxicillin, are not effective because M. pneumoniae does not have a cell wall.

Macrolide antibiotics work by inhibiting Mycoplasma protein biosynthesis. The Chinese Journal of Pediatrics recommends macrolides for mild infections in children, with azithromycin as the first choice, followed by erythromycin or clarithromycin. Alternatively, tetracyclines (eg, doxycycline), and respiratory fluoroquinolones (eg, levofloxacin or moxifloxacin) can be used, but the United States CDC does not recommend them as a first line treatment for children.

=== Resistance ===
Resistance to macrolides has been reported as early as 1967. Increased antibiotic usage has been followed by an increase in resistance since 2000. Resistance in the 2020s has been highest in Asia, as high as 100%, while rates in the United States have varied from 3.5% to 13%. A single base mutation in the V region of 23S rRNA, like A2063/2064G is responsible for more than 90% of the macrolide-resistant infections.

Since routine culture and susceptibility testing is not performed, as M. pneumoniae is difficult to grow, clinicians will select an antibiotic based on an estimate of local resistance, on treatment response and on other factors.

== See also ==
External videos
- Robert Chanock and the Eaton Agent, Leonard Hayflick interview, 61st of 187 parts, Web of Stories.

- Bacterial pneumonia
