= Mycoplasma hyorhinis =

Scientific classification
- Domain: Bacteria
- Kingdom: Bacillati
- Phylum: Mycoplasmatota
- Class: Mollicutes
- Order: Mycoplasmatales
- Family: Mycoplasmataceae
- Genus: Mycoplasma
- Species: M. hyorhinis

Binomial name
- Mycoplasma hyorhinis Switzer 1955 (Approved Lists 1980)

Species of bacterium

Mycoplasma hyorhinis is a species of bacteria in the Mycoplasmataceae family. It is often found as a commensal in the respiratory tract of pigs, and rarely in the skin of humans. M. hyorhinis is thought to facilitate and exacerbate the development of diseases such as porcine enzootic pneumonia and porcine reproductive and respiratory syndrome (PRRS). Rarely, it may cause mycoplasma arthritis, mycoplasmal polyserositis or mycoplasma septicaemia in piglets without the involvement of other bacteria. This presents as polyarthritis or polyserositis.

M. hyorhinis can prevent cell death caused by nicotinamide phosphoribosyltransferase inhibitors.

== Clinical signs and diagnosis ==
A variety of clinical signs are seen in piglets less than 10-weeks old.

Lameness, polyserositis and joint swelling are the most common symptoms. A foul-smelling discharge from the ears can occur secondary to otitis. Less specific signs include poor coat quality, pyrexia, cardiovascular, gastrointestinal, neurological and respiratory signs.

Bacterial culture, immunofluorescent antibody testing (IFAT), complement fixation test and haemagglutination can all be used to confirm the diagnosis.

== Human pathogenicity ==
There is some evidence implicating M. hyorhinis in the pathogenesis of scleroderma, a chronic systemic disease of humans. One study isolated the bacteria from scleroderma patients. Another study found that injecting M. hyorhinis into mice induces a scleroderma-like autoimmune disease. However, more research is needed to confirm or refute the link between M. hyorhinis and scleroderma.

== Treatment ==
Antibiotics are the treatment of choice.

== See also ==
- Mycoplasma
