= Mycoplasma spumans =

Scientific classification
- Domain: Bacteria
- Kingdom: Bacillati
- Phylum: Mycoplasmatota
- Class: Mollicutes
- Order: Mycoplasmatales
- Family: Mycoplasmataceae
- Genus: Mycoplasma
- Species: M. spumans

Binomial name
- Mycoplasma spumans Edward 1955

Synonyms
- "Asterococcus spumans" (Edward 1955) Prévot 1961.

Species of bacterium

Mycoplasma spumans is a species of bacteria in the genus Mycoplasma. This genus of bacteria lacks a cell wall around their cell membrane. Without a cell wall, pathogenic species in this genus are unaffected by many antibiotics such as penicillin or other beta-lactam antibiotics that target cell wall synthesis. Mycoplasma are the smallest bacterial cells yet discovered, can survive without oxygen and are typically about 0.1 μm in diameter.

The etymology of the name of the species comes from the Latiny: L. part. adj. spumans, foaming, presumably alluding to thick dark markings that suggest the presence of globules inside the coarsely reticulated colonies. The type strain is ATCC 19526 = IFO (now NBRC) 14849 = NCTC 10169. Its genome has been determined.

It is associated with respiratory infections in dogs. M. spumans is Gram-negative and appears round or coccobacillary in form. Individual cells vary in diameter from 300 to 600 nm, and each is surrounded by a three-layered cytoplasmic membrane. The cell has a 'fried-egg' resemblance on a variety of growth media. It is anaerobic.
