= Mycoplasmoides pirum =

Scientific classification
- Domain: Bacteria
- Kingdom: Bacillati
- Phylum: Mycoplasmatota
- Class: Mollicutes
- Order: Mycoplasmatales
- Family: Mycoplasmataceae
- Genus: Mycoplasma
- Species: M. pirum

Binomial name
- Mycoplasma pirum (Del Giudice et al. 1985) Gupta et al. 2018

Synonyms
- Mycoplasma pirum Del Giudice et al. 1985

Species of bacterium

Mycoplasmoides pirum is a species of bacteria in the genus Mycoplasmoides. This genus of bacteria lacks a cell wall around their cell membrane. Without a cell wall, they are unaffected by many common antibiotics such as penicillin or other beta-lactam antibiotics that target cell wall synthesis. Mollicutes are the smallest bacterial cells yet discovered, can survive without oxygen and are typically about 0.1 μm in diameter.

It has been isolated from those who immune systems are compromised. It has been isolated from those being treated for HIV infection. The type strain is HRC 70-159 = ATCC 25960 = NCTC 11702. Its natural host is unknown.
