= Mycoplasma adleri =

Scientific classification
- Domain: Bacteria
- Kingdom: Bacillati
- Phylum: Mycoplasmatota
- Class: Mollicutes
- Order: Mycoplasmatales
- Family: Mycoplasmataceae
- Genus: Mycoplasma
- Species: M. adleri

Binomial name
- Mycoplasma adleri Del Giudice et al. 1995

Species of bacterium

Mycoplasma adleri is a species of bacteria in the genus Mycoplasma. This genus of bacteria lacks a cell wall around their cell membrane. Without a cell wall, they are unaffected by many common antibiotics such as penicillin or other beta-lactam antibiotics that target cell wall synthesis. Mycoplasma are the smallest bacterial cells yet discovered, can survive without oxygen and are typically about 0.1 μm in diameter. It is found in goats where it causes infection. The type strain is strain G145 = ATCC 27948 = CIP 105676. Its genome has been determined. M. adleri is gram negative and appears round or coccobacillary in form. Individual cells vary in diameter from 300 to 600 nm, and each is surrounded by a single cytoplasmic membrane. The cell has a ‘fried-egg’ resemblance on a variety of growth media. It is anaerobic.

== See also ==
- Veterinary pathology
