= Eperythrozoon =

Scientific classification
- Domain: Bacteria
- Kingdom: Bacillati
- Phylum: Mycoplasmatota
- Class: Mollicutes
- Order: Mycoplasmoidales
- Family: Mycoplasmoidaceae
- Genus: Eperythrozoon; Schilling 1928 (Approved Lists 1980)

Synonyms
- Heterotypic: Haemobartonella Tyzzer and Weinman 1939 (Approved Lists 1980)

Genus of bacteria

Eperythrozoon is a genus of bacteria in the family Mycoplasmoidaceae. Members of this family live inside red blood cells and are largely unculturable. As a result, many species are Candidatus. Under the old understanding of this genus as a phylogenetically divergent group under Mycoplasma, the included bacteria are also known as hemoplasmas or hemotrophic mycoplasmas.

== Taxonomy ==
The members of this genus have variously been named under Eperythrozoon, Haemobartonella (before that, Bartonella), and Mycoplasma. When they were under Mycoplasma, most species had a specific epithet starting with hemo or haemo (meaning "blood"), giving them the informal name "hemoplasmas" or "hemotrophic mycoplasmas". The merge into Mycoplasma is now known to be misguided and resulted in a polyphyletic Mycoplasma. The current circumscription of the genus is by Gupta et al. (2018).

According to LPSN, several renames in Gupta et al. (2018) have not yet been made valid or pro-valid. This article nevertheless uses these names because they imply a monophyletic Mycoplasma. For more background on resistance to renaming medically-important bacteria, see Bacterial taxonomy § Pathology vs. phylogeny.

Species include:

- "E. canis" (Kreier and Ristic 1984 ex Kikuth 1928) Gupta et al. 2018
- E. coccoides Schilling 1928 (Approved Lists 1980) – type species
- "Candidatus E. haematobovis" corrig. (Tagawa et al. 2008) Gupta et al. 2018
- "Candidatus E. haematolamae" corrig. (Messick et al. 2002) Gupta et al. 2018
- "Candidatus E. haematominutum" corrig. (Foley and Pedersen 2001) Gupta et al. 2018
- "Candidatus E. haemobos" (Tagawa et al. 2008) Gupta et al. 2018
- "Candidatus E. haemolamae" (Messick et al. 2002) Gupta et al. 2018
- "Candidatus E. haemominutum" (Foley and Pedersen 2001) Gupta et al. 2018
- "E. muris" (Mayer 1921) Gupta et al. 2018
- E. ovis Neitz et al. 1934 (Approved Lists 1980)
- E. parvum Splitter 1950 (Approved Lists 1980)
- E. suis Splitter 1950 (Approved Lists 1980)
- E. wenyonii corrig. Adler and Ellenbogen 1934 (Approved Lists 1980)

Additional possible members can be found in Mycoplasma § Unassigned species. Several hemotrophic species published after 2018 were named under Mycoplasma despite the 2018 change.

== Clinical relevance ==
Eperythrozoon infection can cause fever, hemolytic anemia, and jaundice in infected animals (domestic, wild, and humans).

=== Domestic animals ===
Eperythrozoon is a major pathogen of domestic animals. The specific epithets in this genus are, in fact, mostly named after the animal the species is discovered in. Diagnosis is by blood smear microscopy or the more sensitive PCR. Treatment is by tetracyclines, similar to other Mollicutes.

=== Humans ===
Eperythrozoon ovis and Eperythrozoon parvum have been implicated in human infections. It is believed to spread by contact with animals or arthropods, but cases have been reported without extensive contact. Diagnosis is by blood smear microscopy or PCR. Definite identification of the species responsible can be achieved through gene sequencing.

"Ca. Mycoplasma haemohominis", as the name suggests, is originally found in a human. A case report describes identification of the bacterium and its quinolone antibiotic resistance mutation through genome sequencing. The patient was treated successfully with moxifloxacin and minocycline combination.

== Phylogeny ==
For now, consult Gupta et al. (2018). Trees extracted from 'The All-Species Living Tree' Project (16S ribosomal RNA) and GTDB (120 marker genes) will be included in the article at a later date.
