= Mycoplasma spermatophilum =

Scientific classification
- Domain: Bacteria
- Kingdom: Bacillati
- Phylum: Mycoplasmatota
- Class: Mollicutes
- Order: Mycoplasmatales
- Family: Mycoplasmataceae
- Genus: Mycoplasma
- Species: M. spermatophilum

Binomial name
- Mycoplasma spermatophilum Hill 1991

Species of bacterium

Mycoplasma spermatophilum is a species of bacteria in the genus Mycoplasma. This genus of bacteria lacks a cell wall around their cell membrane. Without a cell wall, they are unaffected by many common antibiotics such as penicillin or other beta-lactam antibiotics that target cell wall synthesis. Mycoplasma are the smallest bacterial cells yet discovered, can survive without oxygen and are typically about 0. 1 μm in diameter.

This mycoplasma species was originally isolated from human spermatozoa and a human cervix. It has been rare in humans because it was recovered from only 1 to 2% of the samples examined in two surveys. These initial samples were collected at a fertility clinic where it was noted that either eggs did not become fertilized with infected sperm or fertilized eggs did not implant in in-vitro fertilization procedures. The genome of this species has been partially sequenced.

The type strain is AH159 = ATCC 49695 = CIP 105549 = NCTC 11720.
