= Mycoplasma primatum =

Scientific classification
- Domain: Bacteria
- Kingdom: Bacillati
- Phylum: Mycoplasmatota
- Class: Mollicutes
- Order: Mycoplasmatales
- Family: Mycoplasmataceae
- Genus: Mycoplasma
- Species: M. primatum

Binomial name
- Mycoplasma primatum Del Giudice et al. 1985

Species of bacterium

Mycoplasma primatum is a species of bacteria in the genus Mycoplasma. This genus of bacteria lacks a cell wall around their cell membrane. Without a cell wall, they are unaffected by many common antibiotics such as penicillin or other beta-lactam antibiotics that target cell wall synthesis. Mycoplasma are the smallest bacterial cells yet discovered, can survive without oxygen and are typically about 0. 1 μm in diameter.

This species is common in the oral and urogenital tracts of cercopithecine monkeys where it was first isolated in 1971. It was also isolated a human with an infected umbilicus and vagina in 1955. It has not been identified as a pathogen. Its genome has been sequenced. The type strain is ATCC 25948 = NCTC 10163.
