= Mycoplasma amphoriforme =

Scientific classification
- Domain: Bacteria
- Kingdom: Bacillati
- Phylum: Mycoplasmatota
- Class: Mollicutes
- Order: Mycoplasmatales
- Family: Mycoplasmataceae
- Genus: Mycoplasma
- Species: M. amphoriforme

Binomial name
- Mycoplasma amphoriforme Pitcher et al. 2005

Species of bacterium

Mycoplasma amphoriforme is a species of bacteria in the genus Mycoplasma. This genus of bacteria lacks a cell wall around their cell membrane. Without a cell wall, they are unaffected by many common antibiotics such as penicillin or other beta-lactam antibiotics that target cell wall synthesis. Mycoplasma are the smallest bacterial cells yet discovered, can survive without oxygen and are typically about 0.1 μm in diameter.

It has been found in human respiratory infections and is associated with chronic bronchitis in immunosuppressed patients. It has been observed to possess gliding motility, a protruding polar tip resembling that of M. gallisepticum, and cytoskeletal structure at its polar tip similar to M. pneumonia's. Those infected show symptoms of lower respiratory tract infections such as increased respiratory rates and increased pulse rates.

The type strain is strain A39 = ATCC BAA-992 = NCTC 11740 .

== See also ==
- Lower respiratory tract infection
