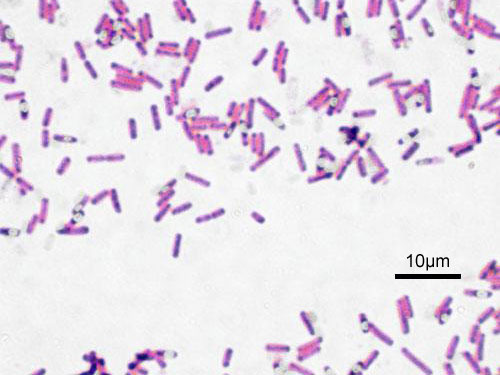
- Bacillus subtilis, Gram stain

Scientific classification
- Domain: Bacteria
- Kingdom: Bacillati
- Phylum: Bacillota
- Class: Bacilli; Ludwig et al. 2010

Orders
- Alicyclobacillales; Aneurinibacillales; Bacillales; Brevibacillales; "Brockiales"; Caldalkalibacillales; Calditerricolales; Culicoidibacterales; Desulfuribacillales; Exiguobacteriales; Haloplasmatales; "Harrysmithimonadales"; Kyrpidiales; Lactobacillales; Paenibacillales; "Pasteuriales"; "Rubeoparvulales"; Staphylococcales; Tepidibacillales; Thermicanales; Thermoactinomycetales; Tumebacillales

Synonyms
- Alicyclobacillia Chuvochina et al. 2024; "Bacillia" Oren, Parte & Garrity 2016; Culicoidibacteria Neupane et al. 2020; Desulfuribacillia Sorokin et al. 2021; Firmibacteria Murray 1988; Teichobacteria Cavalier-Smith 2002

= Bacilli =

Class of bacteria in the phylum Firmicutes

Bacilli is a taxonomic class of bacteria that includes two orders, Bacillales and Lactobacillales, which contain several well-known pathogens such as Bacillus anthracis (the cause of anthrax). Bacilli are almost exclusively gram-positive bacteria.

The name Bacillus, capitalized and italicized, refers to a specific genus of bacteria. The name Bacilli, capitalized but not italicized, can also refer to a less specific taxonomic group of bacteria that includes two orders, one of which contains the genus Bacillus. When the word is formatted with lowercase and not italicized, 'bacillus', it will most likely be referring to shape and not to the genus at all.

== Ambiguity ==
Several related concepts make use of similar words, and the ambiguity can create considerable confusion. The term "Bacillus" (capitalized and italicized) is also the name of a genus (Bacillus anthracis) that, among many other genera, falls within the class Bacilli.

The word "bacillus" (or its plural "bacilli") with a lowercase b is also a generic term to describe the morphology of any rod-shaped bacterium. This general term does not mean that the subject is a member of class Bacilli or genus Bacillus. Thus, it does not necessarily imply a similar group of characteristics. Not all members of class Bacilli are rod-shaped (Staphylococcus is spherical), and many other rod-shaped bacteria that do not fall within that class exist (e.g., Clostridium is rod-shaped but very different taxonomically). Moreover, the general term "bacillus" does not necessarily indicate the Gram-positive staining common to class Bacilli. For example, E. coli is a rod-shaped bacterium that can be described as "a bacillus", but it stains Gram-negative and does not belong to the genus Bacillus or the class Bacilli. Some microbiologists have forsaken the general "bacillus" term because of the confusion it can create.

== Phylogeny ==
The currently accepted taxonomy based on the List of Prokaryotic names with Standing in Nomenclature (LPSN) and the National Center for Biotechnology Information (NCBI).

16S rRNA based LTP_10_2024

- "Bacillia" {Bacillota}
  - - - Hydrogenibacillus
      - Thermicanales
    - - Alicyclobacillales (incl. Kyrpidiales, Tumebacillales)
      - Paenibacillales
  - - Thermoactinomycetales
    - - - Novibacillaceae
        - - Caldalkalibacillales
          - - Caldibacillaceae
            - Calditerricolales
      - - - - Microaerobacter
            - - Desulfuribacillales
              - Tepidibacillales
          - - Oxalophagaceae
            - - Aneurinibacillales
              - Brevibacillales
        - - "Bacillus thermozeamaize"
          - - Bacillales (incl. Planococcaceae)
            - - Listeriaceae
              - - Exiguobacteriales
                - - Staphylococcales
                  - - - Gemellaceae
                      - - Culicoidibacterales
                        - - Turicibacteraceae
                          - - Haloplasmatales
                            - - Acholeplasmatales
                              - - Erysipelotrichales
                                - Mycoplasmatales
                    - Lactobacillales

120 marker proteins based GTDB 09-RS220

- Mycoplasmatota
  - Mollicutes
    - "Aphodocolales"
    - - - "Bathyoplasmales"
        - - "Izemoplasmatales"
          - Acholeplasmatales [incl.Anaeroplasmatales]
      - - - "Caccosomales"
          - Erysipelotrichales
        - Mycoplasmatales [incl. Entomoplasmatales; Mycoplasmoidales]

- "Bacillia" {Bacillota}
  - "Pasteuriales"
  - - - Kyrpidiales
      - - Tumebacillales
        - Alicyclobacillales
    - - Desulfuribacillales
      - - - Calditerricolales
          - - "Bacillus thermozeamaize" {Bacillales_F}
            - - Thermicanales
              - "Brockiales"
        - - Thermoactinomycetales
          - - Paenibacillales
            - - - Microaerobacter {DSM-22679}
                - - Aneurinibacillales
                  - Brevibacillales
              - - Tepidibacillales
                - - "Rubeoparvulales"
                  - - Caldalkalibacillales
                    - - Exiguobacteriales
                      - - "Harrysmithimonadales"
                        - - - "Bacillidae"
                              - Bacillales_B
                              - - Bacillales
                                - - Bacillales_C
                                  - - - - Bacillales_E
                                        - - Sporolactobacillaceae {Bacillales_K}
                                          - Bacillales_G
                                      - Bacillales_H
                                    - - - - Bacillus marinisedimentorum {Bacillales_I}
                                          - Aureibacillaceae {DSM-28697}
                                        - Bacillales_D
                          - - Caryophanaceae {Caryophanales}
                            - - - Staphylococcales
                                - - Culicoidibacterales
                                  - - Turicibacteraceae {MOL361}
                                    - Haloplasmatales
                              - Lactobacillales

== See also ==
- List of bacterial orders
- List of bacteria genera
