= Mesoplasma =

Mesomoplasma

Scientific classification
- Domain: Bacteria
- Kingdom: Bacillati
- Phylum: Mycoplasmatota
- Class: Mollicutes
- Order: Mycoplasmatales
- Family: Mycoplasmataceae
- Genus: Mesoplasma; Tully et al. 1993

Type species
- Mesoplasma flora (McCoy et al. 1984) Tully et al. 1993

Species
- M. chauliocola; M. coleopterae; M. entomophilum; M. flora; M. grammopterae; M. melaleucae; M. tabanidae

Genus of bacteria

Mesoplasma is a genus of bacteria belonging to the class Mollicutes. Mesoplasma is related to the genus Mycoplasma but differ in several respects.

== Phylogeny ==
The currently accepted taxonomy is based on the List of Prokaryotic names with Standing in Nomenclature (LPSN) and National Center for Biotechnology Information (NCBI).

16S rRNA based LTP_10_2024

- Mesoplasma
  - M. chauliocola
  - - M. tabanidae
    - - M. coleopterae
      - - M. grammopterae
        - - M. entomophilum
          - M. flora

120 marker proteins based GTDB 09-RS220

- Mesoplasma
  - M. chauliocola Tully et al. 1994
  - - M. melaleucae (Tully et al. 1990) Gupta, Son & Oren 2019
    - - - M. flora (McCoy et al. 1984) Tully et al. 1993
        - M. grammopterae Tully et al. 1994
      - - M. tabanidae Tully et al. 1994
        - - M. coleopterae Tully et al. 1994
          - M. entomophilum (Tully et al. 1988) Tully et al. 1993

== See also ==
- List of bacteria genera
- List of bacterial orders
