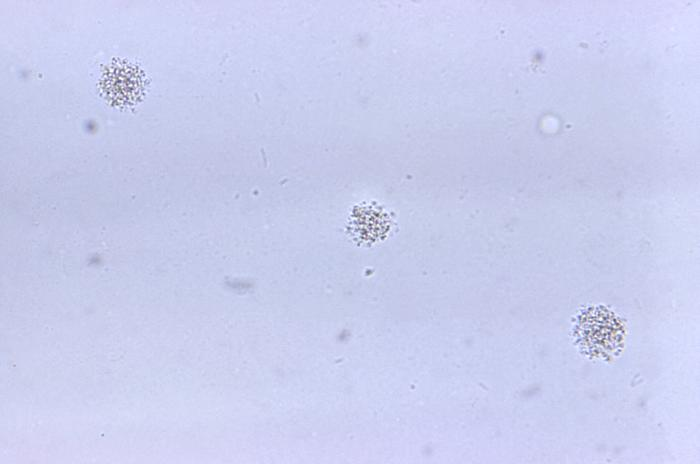
- A number of medium-sized, Ureaplasma urealyticum colonies, otherwise known as T-strain mycoplasma, under magnification of 500×

Scientific classification
- Domain: Bacteria
- Kingdom: Bacillati
- Phylum: Mycoplasmatota
- Class: Mollicutes
- Order: Mycoplasmoidales
- Family: Mycoplasmoidaceae
- Genus: Ureaplasma
- Species: U. urealyticum

Binomial name
- Ureaplasma urealyticum Shepard et al. 1974 (Approved Lists 1980)

= Ureaplasma urealyticum =

Species of bacterium

Ureaplasma urealyticum is a bacterium belonging to the genus Ureaplasma and class Mollicutes. The Mycoplasmatota family consists of the genera Mycoplasma and Ureaplasma. Its type strain is T960. These strains of bacteria are commonly found as a commensal organisms in the human urogenital tracts where it can exist as part of the normal microbiota without causing symptoms. Unlike most bacteria, Ureaplasma urealyticum lacks a peptidoglycan cell wall making it unique in physiology and medical treatment.

A distinguishing feature of U. urealyticum is its ability to hydrolyze urea into ammonia and carbon dioxide through the enzyme urease. This process contributes to the electrochemical gradient that supports adenosine triphosphate (ATP) synthesis.

Although it is often present in the urogenital tract without symptoms, it has been associated with several clinical conditions. In some instances U. urealyticum overgrowth can be correlated urogenital infections, potential pregnancy complications, and pelvic inflammatory disease. While infections can be treated with antibiotics, detection of the bacteria does not mean it must be treated. Research has also investigated potential associations with infertility, chorioamnionitis, premature rupture of membranes, preterm birth, and adverse neonatal outcomes. However, its potential pathogenicity is currently being evaluated as its clinical significance remains unknown. This is because colonization of U. urealyticum is common and detection of it does not equate to disease.

When treatment is clinically indicated, antibiotics such as macrolides, tetracyclines, and fluoroquinolones may be considered. Because U. urealyticum lacks a cell wall, anitbiotics that inhibit cell wall synthesis are ineffective. Increasing antimicrobial resistance among some strains has raised concerns about treatment effectiveness and emphasizes the importance of appropriate antibiotic selection.

== Classification ==
Ureaplasma urealyticum is one of two Ureaplasma species commonly identified within humans. A defining characteristic of the genus is that they perform urea hydrolysis, which creates ammonia as a product. Some strains that were originally classified as U. urealyticum are now classified as a new species, U. parvum.

Historically, 14 serovars of human-associated Ureaplasma were classified under Ureaplasma urealyticum. These were divided into two biovars based on differences in genome size, DNA sequence, and other biological characteristics. Further genetic analysis supported the separation of these groups into two distinct species. Serovars 1, 3, 6, 14 were reclassified as Ureaplasma parvum, while serovars 2, 4, 5, and 7-13 retained the Ureaplasma urealyticum designation. The reclassification allows for more accurate identification and differentiation of the two species.

== Genome ==
Ureaplasma urealyticum has a relatively small genome. Comparative genomic studies have identified genome sizes ranging from approximately 0.84 to 0.95 megabases (Mbp) among U. urealyticum strains, compared with approximately 0.75 to 0.78 Mbp in U. parvum. All the strains of U. urealyticum had two rRNA operons and tRNA coding genes. These differences in genome size help show variation in genetic content between the two species. But in general the two species are extremely similar at the genome level.

== Microbiology ==
=== Gram staining ===
U. urealyticum represents one of the 14 distinct types within the Ureaplasma genus. Classified within the Mollicutes class, Ureaplasma species have undergone significant evolutionary adaptations from their Gram-positive bacterial ancestors, a phenomenon termed degenerative evolutions. This evolutionary trajectory has resulted in the loss of the peptidoglycan cell wall, a hallmark characteristic of Gram-positive and Gram-negative bacteria. Due to this evolutionary divergence, it is imperative to recognize that the U. urealyticum does not prove to be reactive with Gram staining. Since Gram staining depends on differences in cell-wall structure, Ureaplasma cannot be characterized as Gram-positive or Gram-negative using this method. The absence of a cell wall contributes to intrinsic resistance toward antibiotics that inhibit cell wall synthesis, therefore they are not effective in treating U. urealyticum infections.

=== ATP Synthesis and Metabolism ===
Metabolic pathway diagram illustrating urea hydrolysis and associated ATP synthesis in Ureaplasma diversum, including urease activity and membrane-associated energy metabolism. U. diversum and U. urealyticum are similar in basic biological structure, family classification, and metabolism, but they differ significantly in their natural hosts and the specific health conditions they cause.

Ureaplasma species use a distinctive mechanism to produce energy, in which the breakdown of urea provides most of the energy required for ATP synthesis. Approximately 95% of ATP production in Ureaplasma studied were associated with urea hydrolysis, while the remaining 5% was speculated to be from substrate level phosphorylation.

First, the enzyme urease catalyzes the hydrolysis of urea into ammonia and carbon dioxide. The accumulation of ammonia and ammonium molecules within the bacterial cell creates an electrochemical gradient across the membrane. Researchers have proposed that the movement of ammonia out of the cell establishes a chemiosmotic potential that drives ATP synthesis through a membrane-associated F₀F₁-ATPase. This enzyme consists of a membrane-spanning F₀ component involved in proton transport and an F₁ component for ATP synthesis.

Genes encoding urease, two ammonia transporters belonging to the Amt family, and the F-type ATPase complex have been identified in genomic analysis. Although Ureaplasma can also metabolize carbohydrates, this pathway contributes relatively little to its overall ATP production compared with urea hydrolysis.

In addition to urea hydrolysis, Ureaplasma species possess genes involved in several other metabolic processes, including carbohydrate metabolism, nucleotide biosynthesis, and phospholipid synthesis. However it is important to mention these bacteria have limited biosynthetic capabilities due to their small genomes. Genomic analysis has identified enzymes associated with glycolysis, including phosphofructokinase, phosphoglycerate kinase, and pyruvate kinase, however several metabolic pathways are incomplete due to genome size. Ureaplasma species mostly depend on nutrients obtained from their surrounding environment to support growth and cellular functions.

== Clinical relevance ==
In men higher levels of Ureaplasma urealyticum can be associated with urethritis, as studies have shown positive correlations between white blood cell count and bacteria concentration when looking at urine samples.

In females it may also be linked to bacterial vaginosis (BV). This study demonstrated that the colonization of the vaginal tract by U. urealyticum increased the chances of BV four times compared to those without. Infection can occur in extragenital sites in special cases where immunosuppression or instrumentation occurs allowing it to appear outside of the urogenital tracts. In 2019 in an experimental mouse study, researchers hypothesized that U. urealyticum might contribute to the development of endometriosis by triggering an immune response. Researchers found that U. urealyticum induced the production of inflammatory mediators by peritoneal mesothelial cells (PMC) through TLR2 signals. This study suggests that infection-induced pelvic inflammation by U. urealyticum helps contribute to the progression of endometriosis.

Co-colonization with U. urealyticum and human papillomavirus (HPV) has been researched as a potential factor associated with cervical disease. This study reported that a large colonization of Ureaplasma urealyticum had a significant correlation with the appearance of HPV and could be a cofactor in its infection. It also stated that the infection of both HPV and Ureaplasma urealyticum could lead to the development of cervical intraepithelial neoplasia (CIN)

500x magnification of Ureaplasma urealyticum colonies on 4mL agar. Image from the CDC.

=== Infertility ===
U. urealyticum has been linked to infertility. However, in males, there has been mixed results due to other studies finding that the sperm concentration, motility, and morphology were similar in groups that were positive and negative for Ureaplasma urealyticum, though the positive group having a significantly higher count of anti-sperm antibodies.

=== Pregnancy and neonatal outcomes ===
U. urealyticum can colonize the reproductive tract and has been detected in amniotic fluid, placental tissues, and the fetal membrane during pregnancy. Infection during pregnancy has been associated with chorioamnionitis or intra-amniotic infection as well as pre-term birth. In a study it was demonstrated that women infected with chorioamnionitis carried Ureaplasma urealyticum at rates from 40% to 57%, however the presence of the bacteria does not establish causation for the infection. Ureaplasma urealyticum infection has been associated with premature rupture of membranes (PROM), which can be a direct cause of preterm birth.

Neonatal complications associated with maternal or neonatal U. urealyticum exposure have included children with bronchopulmonary dysplasia, Intraventricular hemorrhage, and necrotizing enterocolitis. In a study done in 2024 it found increased odds in bronchopulmonary dysplasia, and Intraventricular hemorrhage but found the correlation in necrotizing enterocolitis was not significant However, in another study it found that the genus of Ureaplasma causes higher odds of necrotizing enterocolitis in very low birth weight (VLBW) infants.

Many of these findings are associations as there are other confounding variables such as gestational age or birth weight. Patients can evolve resistances to normal antibiotic treatments due to the distinctive physiology of these organisms. Patients who are pregnant have further limitations on the treatment course of a Ureaplasma urealyticum infection as they are not safely allowed to use tetracyclines and fluoroquinolones, which makes it far harder to successfully cure.

== Treatment ==
The Ureaplasma species can colonize the human urogenital tract without producing symptoms making it difficult to detect and determine an active infection. Since Ureaplasma urealyticum lacks a cell wall, it is resistant to β-lactam antibiotics including cephalosporins and penicillins, which are commonly used to treat urinary tract infections.

Common antibiotics used to treat U. urealyticum infections include fluoroquinolones, tetracyclines and macrolides because they target DNA replication or protein synthesis rather than the cell wall, which the bacterium lacks. However, there are new movements to use azithromycin, a macrolide, to treat these infections. When Azithromycin is ingested, macrophages take it up and deliver it to the sites of infection. Azithromycin has been studied for its ability to eliminate respiratory tract Ureaplasma and potentially reduce associated complications. Additionally, it is a good alternative when a pregnant woman is infected to prevent harm to the fetus. This is because the antibiotic is transported and acts locally. However, the clinical significance of asymptomatic maternal colonization remains uncertain, and evidence is insufficient to establish that routine antibiotic treatment of colonization prevents adverse pregnancy outcomes.

Petri dish culture plate streaked with Ureaplasma urealyticum. The disk containing the letter “E” was soaked with the antibiotic erythromycin. This disk was placed on the plate to determine the level of antibiotic sensitivity Ureaplasma urealyticum expresses to the antibiotic. Image from the CDC.

=== Antibiotic resistance ===
Some strains of the Ureaplasma species are resistant to fluoroquinolones, tetracyclines and macrolides making treatment options limited. Treatment can be difficult due to the bacterium’s ability to develop genetic mutations which contributes to antibiotic resistance. These mutations may alter the antibiotic target sites reducing the effectiveness of treatments.

A 2025 study of 415 clinical Ureaplasma isolates in the United States and Canada found that 14.7% were resistant to at least one of the antimicrobial drugs tested. The antibiotics tested were erythromycin, tetracycline and levofloxacin. Resistance was detected in 6.7% of isolates for levofloxacin, 2.4% for erythromycin, and 6.5% for tetracycline. Further genetic analysis linked erythromycin resistance to mutations in 23S rRNA and rpiD, tetracycline resistance to tet(M) determinant, and levofloxacin resistance to parC mutations.

Despite antibiotic resistant strains, many isolates tested remained susceptible to other antimicrobial drugs tested. Suggesting that tetracyclines, fluoroquinolones and macrolides still remain as possible treatment options for Ureaplasma infections.

== See also ==
- Mycoplasma
- International Organization for Mycoplasmology (IOM)
- Uterine microbiome
- Sexually transmitted infection
- Vaginal infection
- Vaginal health
- List of bacterial vaginosis microbiota
