= Mycoplasma salivarium =

Scientific classification
- Domain: Bacteria
- Kingdom: Bacillati
- Phylum: Mycoplasmatota
- Class: Mollicutes
- Order: Mycoplasmatales
- Family: Mycoplasmataceae
- Genus: Mycoplasma
- Species: M. salivarium

Binomial name
- Mycoplasma salivarium Edward 1955

Synonyms
- "Asterococcus salivarius" (Edward 1955) Prévot 1961, "Schizoplasma salivarium" (Edward 1955) Furness 1970

Species of bacterium

Mycoplasma salivarium (also known as Metamycoplasma salivarium) is a species of bacteria in the genus Mycoplasma. This genus of bacteria lacks a cell wall around their cell membrane. Without a cell wall, they are unaffected by many common antibiotics such as penicillin or other beta-lactam antibiotics that target cell wall synthesis. Mycoplasma are the smallest bacterial cells yet discovered, and are typically about 0. 1 μm in diameter. Mycoplasma can survive without oxygen.

Mycoplasma salivarium is found in the mouths of 97% of the healthy population, and is generally considered to be a commensal organism and part of the normal oral flora.

Mycoplasma salivarium has, however, been implicated in eye and ear disorders, oral infection, septic arthritis and periodontal disease. This species has been isolated from synovial fluid from patients with chronic arthritis and from primates. It has been recovered from a biliary stent. It also was recovered from the pleural cavity of a hospitalized man who did not respond to the normal treatment of conventional antibiotics, and it has been cultured from brain abscesses. It has also been recently identified as a common finding in patients with ventilator-acquired pneumonia, a severe infection which can occur in patients in the intensive care unit, and it may play a role in dampening down the immune response to other pathogens so allowing opportunistic infection to develop.

The type strain is ATCC 23064 = IFO (now NBRC) 14478 = NCTC 10113.
