= Mycoplasma lipophilum =

Scientific classification
- Domain: Bacteria
- Kingdom: Bacillati
- Phylum: Mycoplasmatota
- Class: Mollicutes
- Order: Mycoplasmatales
- Family: Mycoplasmataceae
- Genus: Mycoplasma
- Species: M. lipophilum

Binomial name
- Mycoplasma lipophilum Del Giudice et al. 1974

Synonyms
- "Mycoplasma lipophiliae" (sic) Del Giudice and Carski 1968.

Species of bacterium

Mycoplasma lipophilum is a species of bacteria in the genus Mycoplasma. This genus of bacteria lacks a cell wall around their cell membrane. Without a cell wall, they are unaffected by many common antibiotics such as penicillin or other beta-lactam antibiotics that target cell wall synthesis. Mycoplasma are the smallest bacterial cells yet discovered, can survive without oxygen and are typically about 0.1 μm in diameter.

Mycoplsma lipophilum appears to be relatively rare in humans and was initially isolated from the human oral cavity. It also has been cultured from primates.

The type strain is strain ATCC 27104 = IFO (now NBRC) 14895 = NCTC 10173.
