= Entomoplasma =

Scientific classification
- Domain: Bacteria
- Kingdom: Bacillati
- Phylum: Mycoplasmatota
- Class: Mollicutes
- Order: Mycoplasmatales
- Family: Mycoplasmataceae
- Genus: Entomoplasma; Tully et al. 1993

Type species
- Entomoplasma ellychniae (Tully et al. 1989) Tully et al. 1993

Species
- Entomoplasma ellychniae; Entomoplasma freundtii

Genus of bacteria

Entomoplasma is a mollicute bacteria genus. Entomoplasma freundtii can be isolated from the green tiger beetle (Cicindela campestris, Coleoptera: Cicindelidae).

== Phylogeny ==
The currently accepted taxonomy is based on the List of Prokaryotic names with Standing in Nomenclature (LPSN) and National Center for Biotechnology Information (NCBI).

16S rRNA based LTP_10_2024

- Entomoplasma
  - "E. corruscae" (Tully et al. 1994) Gasparich & Kuo 2019
  - E. ellychniae (Tully et al. 1989) Tully et al. 1993

120 marker proteins based GTDB 09-RS220

- Entomoplasma
  Entomoplasma ellychniae [incl. "E. corruscae"]
