= Mycoplasma buccale =

Scientific classification
- Domain: Bacteria
- Kingdom: Bacillati
- Phylum: Mycoplasmatota
- Class: Mollicutes
- Order: Mycoplasmatales
- Family: Mycoplasmataceae
- Genus: Mycoplasma
- Species: M. buccale

Binomial name
- Mycoplasma buccale Freundt et al. 1974

Species of bacterium

Mycoplasma buccale is a species of bacteria in the genus Mycoplasma. This genus of bacteria lacks a cell wall around their cell membrane. Without a cell wall, they are unaffected by many common antibiotics such as penicillin or other beta-lactam antibiotics that target cell wall synthesis. Mycoplasma are the smallest bacterial cells yet discovered, can survive without oxygen and are typically about 0. 1 μm in diameter.

It was first described in 1974 and is considered a rare inhabitant of humans. The type strain is strain ATCC 23636 = CIP 105530 = IFO (now NBRC) 14851 = NCTC 10136. This species is noted for its ability to recover from the damaging effects of UV light, which usually is fatal to other mycoplasma species tested.
