= Malacoplasma penetrans =

Scientific classification
- Domain: Bacteria
- Kingdom: Bacillati
- Phylum: Mycoplasmatota
- Class: Mollicutes
- Order: Mycoplasmoidales
- Family: Mycoplasmoidaceae
- Genus: Malacoplasma
- Species: M. penetrans

Binomial name
- Malacoplasma penetrans (Lo et al.) Gupta et al. 2018

Synonyms
- Mycoplasma penetrans Lo et al. 1992

Species of bacterium

Malacoplasma penetrans (formerly Mycoplasma penetrans). It is pathogenic, though many infected show no symptoms. It is a sexually transmitted disease, though an infant may be infected during birth.

== Description ==
It has an elongated shape and its cells possess two internal compartments, one packed with granules, the other filled with coarse granules (consistent with ribosomal structures). The organism has properties of adherence through a specific organelle called the tip organelle. M. Penetrans has a coding sequence (MYPE1570) similar to that of MYPE470 in Mycoplasma pneumoniae which codes for an accessory protein that aids in cytadherence, the adherence to respiratory epithelium. This similarity suggests M. penetrans could attach to host cells through cytadherence. Also, the CDS MYPE1550, which is near MYPE1570, of M. penetrans is orthologous to the hemadsorption protein HMW2 of M pneumoniae, suggesting the potential for M. penetrans to attach to and invade red blood cells.

== Virulence factors ==
Mycoplasma penetrans, like many bacteria, exhibits a mechanism by which it can avoid an immune response in the host cells. This avoidance of immune responses is known as a virulence factor. The virulence factor that M. penetrans displays is antigenic variation, the ability to exchange or switch antigens against which the host cell produces antibodies. The mpl gene encodes for the bacteria's antigens and, like most genes, it contains a promoter region. In M. penetrans, this promoter region can undergo reversible inversion, allowing for variation in antigen production and, thus, the source for M. penetrans antigenic variation.

== Diseases ==
Mycoplasma penetrans has been shown to hinder p53, a tumor suppressing gene that aids in regulating the cell cycle. There have also been cases of malignant pleural effusion, when patients exhibited chronic M. penetrans infection with various immunodeficiencies (such as HIV infections or anticancer treatment). This particular species is also a sexually transmitted disease and one cause of pelvic inflammatory disease.
