= Mycoplasma faucium =

Scientific classification
- Domain: Bacteria
- Kingdom: Bacillati
- Phylum: Mycoplasmatota
- Class: Mollicutes
- Order: Mycoplasmatales
- Family: Mycoplasmataceae
- Genus: Mycoplasma
- Species: M. faucium

Binomial name
- Mycoplasma faucium Freundt et al. 1974 (Approved Lists 1980)

Species of bacterium

Mycoplasma faucium is a species of bacteria in the genus Mycoplasma. This genus of bacteria lacks a cell wall around their cell membrane. Without a cell wall, they are unaffected by many common antibiotics such as penicillin or other beta-lactam antibiotics that target cell wall synthesis. Mycoplasma are the smallest bacterial cells yet discovered, can survive without oxygen and are typically about 0.1 μm in diameter.

It was first described in 1974 and has been considered a rare inhabitant of humans. It is considered to usually be a commensal and is a rare bacteria of the normal microbiota of the human oropharynx; it is sometimes cultured from oropharynx of nonhuman primates. However, recent reports have proposed that in common with Mycoplasma hominis, M. faucium may be a pathogen in some brain abscesses.

The type strain is strain ATCC 25293 = NCTC 10174.
