= Mycoplasma fermentans =

Scientific classification
- Domain: Bacteria
- Kingdom: Bacillati
- Phylum: Mycoplasmatota
- Class: Mollicutes
- Order: Mycoplasmatales
- Family: Mycoplasmataceae
- Genus: Mycoplasma
- Species: M. fermentans

Binomial name
- Mycoplasma fermentans Edward, 1955

Species of bacterium

Mycoplasma fermentans is a very small bacterium in the class Mollicutes. Like other mycoplasmas M. fermentans is characterized by the absence of a peptidoglycan cell wall and resulting resistance to many antibacterial agents. It is a possible human pathogen with roles suggested in many illness such as respiratory, genital, and rheumatoid diseases among others. Investigations have focused on a possible link to it being a cofactor in HIV infection as well as fibromyalgia, Gulf War syndrome and Chronic fatigue syndrome, however the belief that M. fermentans is pathogenic in such conditions has largely been disregarded after the failure of several large scale studies to find a link. Due to its incredibly small size it is difficult to determine the full extent of its role in human diseases, while M. fermentans has been implicated in a myriad of diseases, research at the current point has not conclusively proven its pathogenicity in humans outside of opportunistic infections.

== Discovery ==
Mycoplasma fermentans was first described by Ruiter and Wentholt in 1952 from isolate of a human genital infection, which led to the initial name G-strain. In 1954 D.G. Edward identified a strain of mycoplasma in his laboratory isolated from 91 different samples collected from humans that differed in its ability to ferment sugars, he labeled this strain human type 3 as it was the 3rd strain he found in the group of samples. This was later identified to be the same strain as Ruiter and Wentholt's G-strain. In 1955 Edward proposed a new naming structure renaming his human type 3 strain and Ruiter and Wentholt's G-strain to M. fermentans due to its believed unique ability amongst the group to ferment multiple sugars. It has since been found that several other mycoplasma are capable of fermenting multiple sugar sources.

== Mycoplasma incognitus ==
In the late 1980s a mycoplasma infection was isolated during autopsy of AIDS patients. This new mycoplasma, dubbed M. incognitus was concerning as it could either be an opportunistic co-infection or a sexually transmitted infectious cofactor to the HIV disease process. This "new" mycoplasma however was later determined to be a strain of M. fermentans. Since then however, several more mycoplasmas have been described as being co-infectious with HIV.

== Characteristics ==
Mycoplasma fermentans is capable of fermenting both glucose and arginine as well as other sugars.
