= Haloplasma =

Scientific classification
- Domain: Bacteria
- Kingdom: Bacillati
- Phylum: Mycoplasmatota
- Class: Mollicutes
- Order: Haloplasmatales; Rainey et al. 2008
- Family: Haloplasmataceae; Rainey et al. 2008
- Genus: Haloplasma; Antunes et al. 2008
- Species: H. contractile

Binomial name
- Haloplasma contractile Antunes et al. 2008

Genus of bacteria

Haloplasma contractile is a halophilic, cell wall-less bacterium. It is the only known representative of a deep lineage, and is classified in its own family (Haloplasmataceae) and order (Haloplasmatales), in the class Mollicutes. In terms of genetics, the bacterium Haloplasma contractile contains a dcw gene cluster is responsible for containing all the genes of the organism and promoting peptidoglycan synthesis. Also, MreB/Mbl are specific homologous parts of this bacterium that are vital in the contractility of the cell. Regarding its physical attributes, this organism consists of a spherical body with approximately two protrusions which alternate between straight and contracted forms.
