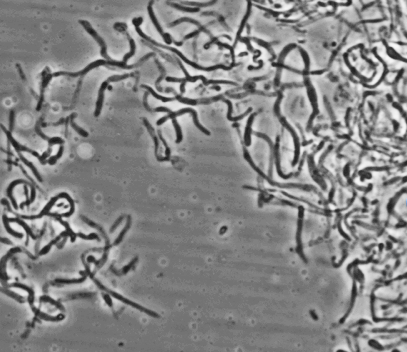
- Turicibacter sp. H121 cells under microscope
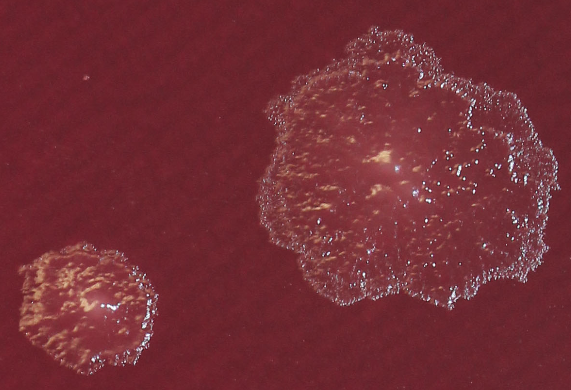
- Turicibacter sp. H121 colonies

Scientific classification
- Domain: Bacteria
- Kingdom: Bacillati
- Phylum: Bacillota
- Class: Erysipelotrichia
- Order: Erysipelotrichales
- Family: Turicibacteraceae; Verbarg et al. 2020
- Genus: Turicibacter; Bosshard, Zbinden & Altwegg 2002

Type species
- Turicibacter sanguinis Bosshard, Zbinden & Altwegg 2002

Species
- Turicibacter bilis; Turicibacter faecis; Turicibacter sanguinis

= Turicibacter =

Genus of bacteria

Turicibacter is a genus in the Bacillota phylum of bacteria that has most commonly been found in the guts of animals. The genus is named after the city in which it was first isolated from the blood of a human, Zurich (Latin = Turicum), Switzerland.

== Phylogeny ==
The position of Turicibacter within the Bacillota could not be resolved using 16S rRNA gene-based analyses. However, it was tentatively placed in the class Bacilli, then the class Erysipelotrichia.

In a tree built using a concatenated protein alignment containing data from two draft Turicibacter genomes, the group was placed at the base of the class Bacilli. Later analyses that also included amino acid sequences predicted by a complete Turicibacter genome came to the same conclusion.

The currently accepted taxonomy is based on the List of Prokaryotic names with Standing in Nomenclature (LPSN) and National Center for Biotechnology Information (NCBI).

16S rRNA based LTP_10_2024

- Turicibacter
  - T. bilis Maki & Looft 2022
  - T. sanguinis Bosshard, Zbinden & Altwegg 2002

120 marker proteins based GTDB 09-RS220

- Turicibacter
  - T. bilis Maki & Looft 2022
  - T. sanguinis Bosshard, Zbinden & Altwegg 2002
