= Mycoplasmoidaceae =

Scientific classification
- Domain: Bacteria
- Kingdom: Bacillati
- Phylum: Mycoplasmatota
- Class: Mollicutes
- Order: Mycoplasmoidales
- Family: Mycoplasmoidaceae; Gupta et al. 2018

Family of bacteria

Mycoplasmoidaceae is a family of bacteria under the order Mycoplasmoidales. It contains the genera Eperythrozoon, Malacoplasma, Mycoplasmoides, and Ureaplasma. Members infect animals, including humans. Before 2018, they were known as the "pneumoniae group" of Mycoplasma. Many species are sexually transmitted and cause pelvic inflammatory disease.

== Genera ==
=== Eperythrozoon ===
This genus includes the so-called "hemoplasmas", the uncultivated organisms that parasitise their hosts by adhering to erythrocytes.

=== Mycoplasmoides ===
This genus contains important human pathogens such as Mycoplasmoides genitalium and Mycoplasmoides pneumoniae.

=== Malacoplasma ===
This genus contains Malacoplasma penetrans, a known human pathogen.

=== Ureaplasma ===
As the name implies, ureaplasma is urease positive. This genera is distinct from other genera in Mollicutes in that it hydrolyses urea for generation of ATP.

==== Ureaplasma spp. as human pathogens ====
Both Ureaplasma urealyticum and Ureaplasma parvum have been identified as important human pathogens, causing infection in the urogenital tract and, rarely, at distal sites. Their role in neonatal disease and adverse pregnancy outcomes has been well established, and semantic classifications are changing to reflect the nature of the detrimental outcomes these infections are associated with. In the 2010s, Mycoplasmoides genitalium has been re-classified as an STI, and it is possible that with more research, Ureaplasma spp. will follow this trend. Similar to other pathogens such as Chlamydia trachomatis, infection with Ureaplasma spp. is associated with adverse fertility outcomes in both men and women. Both cause non-gonococcal urethritis. Ureaplasma spp. were implicated in conditions such as prostatitis and chronic pelvic pain syndrome as early as the 1980s. Research in women has lagged several decades behind, but it is now becoming more clear how Ureaplasma spp. contribute to etiologies such as interstitial cystitis/painful bladder syndrome. Ureaplasma spp. are associated with alterations in host environment that increase susceptibility to other infections such as bacterial vaginosis and vaginal candidiasis. Ureaplasma spp. can cause reactive arthritis as well as directly infect the synovium. Some case studies have suggested a causative role in complex regional pain syndrome/reflex sympathetic dystrophy syndrome.
