= Mycoplasmoidales =

Scientific classification
- Domain: Bacteria
- Kingdom: Bacillati
- Phylum: Mycoplasmatota
- Class: Mollicutes
- Order: Mycoplasmoidales; Gupta et al. 2018

Order of bacteria

Mycoplasmoidales is an order of bacteria in the class Mollicutes. The order consists of the families Mycoplasmoidaceae (formerly the "pneumoniae" group) and Metamycoplasmataceae (formerly the "hominis" group). It includes most human pathogens formerly classified in the genus Mycoplasma.

== Phylogeny ==
The currently accepted taxonomy is based on the List of Prokaryotic names with Standing in Nomenclature (LPSN) and National Center for Biotechnology Information (NCBI).

16S rRNA based LTP_10_2024

- - Metamycoplasmataceae
  - - Mycoplasmoidales
      - Spiroplasma~1
      - Mycoplasmoidaceae
    - Mycoplasmatales sensu Gupta

120 marker proteins based GTDB 09-RS220

- Mycoplasmatales sensu GTDB
  - Mycoplasmoidales sensu Gupta
    - - "Ca. Spiroplasma holothuricola" {MT37}
      - Mycoplasmoidaceae
    - - "Ca. Hepatoplasma" {"Hepatoplasmataceae"}
      - Metamycoplasmataceae
  - Mycoplasmatales sensu Gupta
