= Mollicutes =

Scientific classification
- Domain: Bacteria
- Kingdom: Bacillati
- Phylum: Mycoplasmatota
- Class: Mollicutes; Edward and Freundt 1967

Orders
- Acholeplasmatales; Anaeroplasmatales; Haloplasmatales; Mycoplasmatales; Mycoplasmoidales

Synonyms
- Culicoidibacteria Neupane et al. 2020; Erysipelotrichia Ludwig, Schleifer & Whitman 2010; "Erysipelotrichidae" corrig. Cavalier-Smith 2020; "Izemaplasma" (sic) Skennerton et al. 2016; "Izemoplasmatia" corrig. Zheng et al. 2021; "Paramycetes" Sabin 1941

Class of bacteria

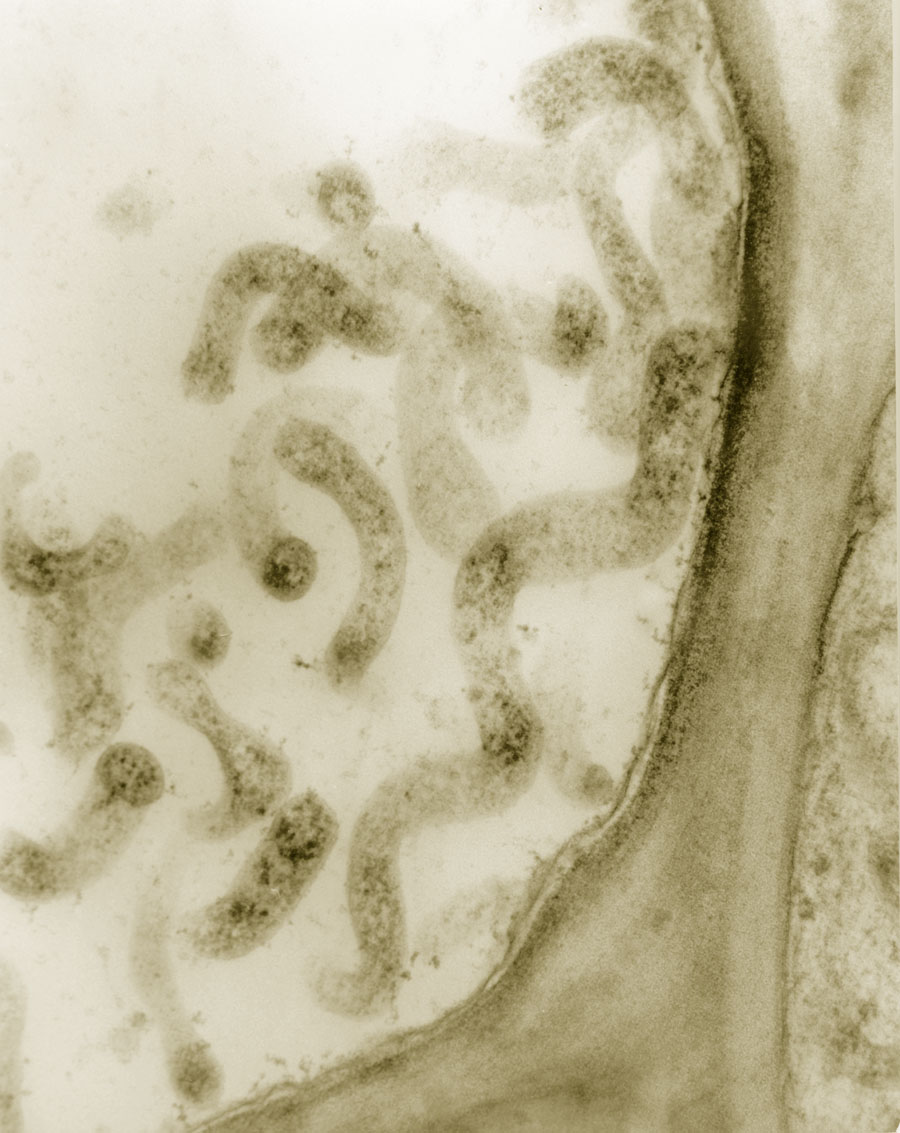
Corn Stunt Spiroplasma in phloem cells. Thick section (0.4 micrometers) observed in a TEM. Magnified 75,000X.

Mollicutes is a class of bacteria distinguished by the absence of a cell wall and its peptidoglycan. The word Mollicutes is derived from Latin mollis 'soft, pliable' and cutis 'skin'. Individuals are very small, typically only 0.2–0.3 μm (200–300 nm) in size and have a very small genome size. They vary in form, although most have sterols that make the cell membrane somewhat more rigid. Many move about by gliding, but members of the genus Spiroplasma are helical and move by twisting. The best-known genus in the Mollicutes is Mycoplasma, though it has been split in 2018 into several genera. Colonies show the typical "fried-egg" appearance.

Mollicutes can be parasitic or saprotrophic. They can be parasites of various animals and plants, living on or in the host's cells. Many cause diseases in humans, attaching to cells in the respiratory or urogenital tracts, particularly species of Mycoplasma and Ureaplasma. Phytoplasma and Spiroplasma are plant pathogens associated with insect vectors.

The absence of peptidoglycan makes them naturally resistant to antibiotics such as the beta-lactam antibiotics that target cell wall synthesis. Several species are pathogenic in humans, including Mycoplasmoides pneumoniae, which is an important cause of "walking" pneumonia and other respiratory disorders, and Mycoplasmoides genitalium, which is believed to be involved in pelvic inflammatory diseases. Mollicutes species are among the smallest organisms yet discovered, can survive without oxygen, and come in various shapes. For example, Md. genitalium is flask-shaped (about 300 x 600 nm), while Md. pneumoniae is more elongated (about 100 x 1000 nm), many Mollicutes species are coccoid. Hundreds of Mollicutes species, mainly those formerly classified in Mycoplasma, infect animals.

Whereas formerly the trivial name "mycoplasma" (plural: "mycoplasmas") has commonly denoted any member of the class Mollicutes, it now in scientific classification refers exclusively to a member of the genus Mycoplasma. A reorganization of Mycoplasma in 2018 has moved many species out of the genus, making this old interpretation once again useful. The smallest taxonomic node that covers all members of pre-2018 Mycoplasma is Mollicutes.

== Origin and evolution to parasitic life ==
Analysis of the genomes of Mollicutes ("mycoplasmas") gives solid support for the hypothesis that Mollicutes evolved from Gram-positive bacteria by a process of reductive evolution. By adopting a parasitic mode of life with use of nutrients from their hosts, many Mollicutes reduced their genetic material considerably. On the other hand, they lost the genes for many assimilative processes. Thus, Mycoplasma possibly became the smallest self-replicating organism in nature. Mycoplasmoides genitalium, with 580,000 base pairs, has an especially small genome size. Some phytoplasmas also have a very small genome size. The genera with the smallest genome are considered to be phylogenetically the most "recent" mollicutes.

To maintain their parasitic mode of life the Mollicutes have developed rather sophisticated mechanisms to colonize their hosts and resist the host immune system.

=== Proliferation ===
Mollicutes (formerly also called pleuropneumonia-like organisms, PPLO) as well as L-form bacteria (formerly also called L-phase bacteria), both lacking cell walls, do not proliferate by binary fission but by a budding mechanism. In 1954, this mode of proliferation has been shown by continual observations of live cells using phase-contrast microscopy.

Previously, Mollicutes were sometimes considered stable L-form bacteria, but phylogenetic analysis has identified them as bacteria that have lost their cell walls in the course of evolution.

== History of the classification ==
The classification of the Mollicutes has always been difficult. The individuals are tiny, and being parasites, they have to be cultivated on special media. Until now, many species could not be isolated at all. In the beginning, whether they were fungi, viruses, or bacteria was not clear. Also, the resemblance to L-forms was confusing. At first, all members of the class Mollicutes were generally named "mycoplasma" or pleuropneumonia-like organism (PPLO). Mollicutes other than some members of genus Mycoplasma were still unidentified. The first species of Mycoplasma/Mollicutes, that could be isolated was Mycoplasma mycoides. This bacterium was cultivated by Nocard and Roux in 1898.

In 1956, D.G. Edward and E.A. Freundt made a first proposal for classifying and naming PPLOs. They left undecided, however, whether they belong to the bacteria (prokaryotes, in 1956 called "Schizomycetes") or to the eukaryotes. As type species (name-giving species) of the PPLOs/mycoplasmas, Edward and Freundt proposed Mycoplasma mycoides, being the causative organism of bovine pleuropneumonia and referring to the pleuropneumonia-like organisms. Until then, Mycoplasma mycoides was known as Asterococcus mycoides, but later that name was not recognized as valid. In their publication of 1956, they described 15 species of Mycoplasma. In 1967 the class Mollicutes, containing the order Mycoplasmatales, was proposed by the Subcommittee on Taxonomy of the Mycoplasmata. Now, the name Mycoplasma should exclusively be used for members of the genus Mycoplasma, rather than the use as a trivial name for any Mollicute. As the trivial name has been used in literature for a long time, this is yet not always the case.

For classification and nomenclature of Mollicutes, there are special rules, which are maintained by the International Committee on Systematics of Prokaryotes (ICSP) Subcommittee on the Taxonomy of Mollicutes (formerly the International Committee on Systematic Bacteriology (ICSB) Subcommittee on taxonomy of Mycoplasmatales).

Traditionally, Mollicutes taxonomy has been based on serology and phenotypic characteristics. However, most modern classifications are based on DNA or RNA sequences, especially 16S rRNA sequences (see Figure).

=== Three divisions of the bacteria ===
Traditionally, the taxonomy of bacteria was based on similarities and differences in morphology (Linnaean taxonomy).

In 1962, R.G.E. Murray proposed to divide the "kingdom" (now domain) Bacteria into three divisions (= phyla) on the basis of the cell wall types:

1. Gram-negative Gracilicutes, with a thin cell wall and little peptidoglycan;
2. Gram-positive Firmicutes, with a thicker cell wall and more peptidoglycan (the name was later changed in "Firmicutes"), and
3. the "Mollicutes", without a cell wall.

=== The phylum for Mollicutes ===
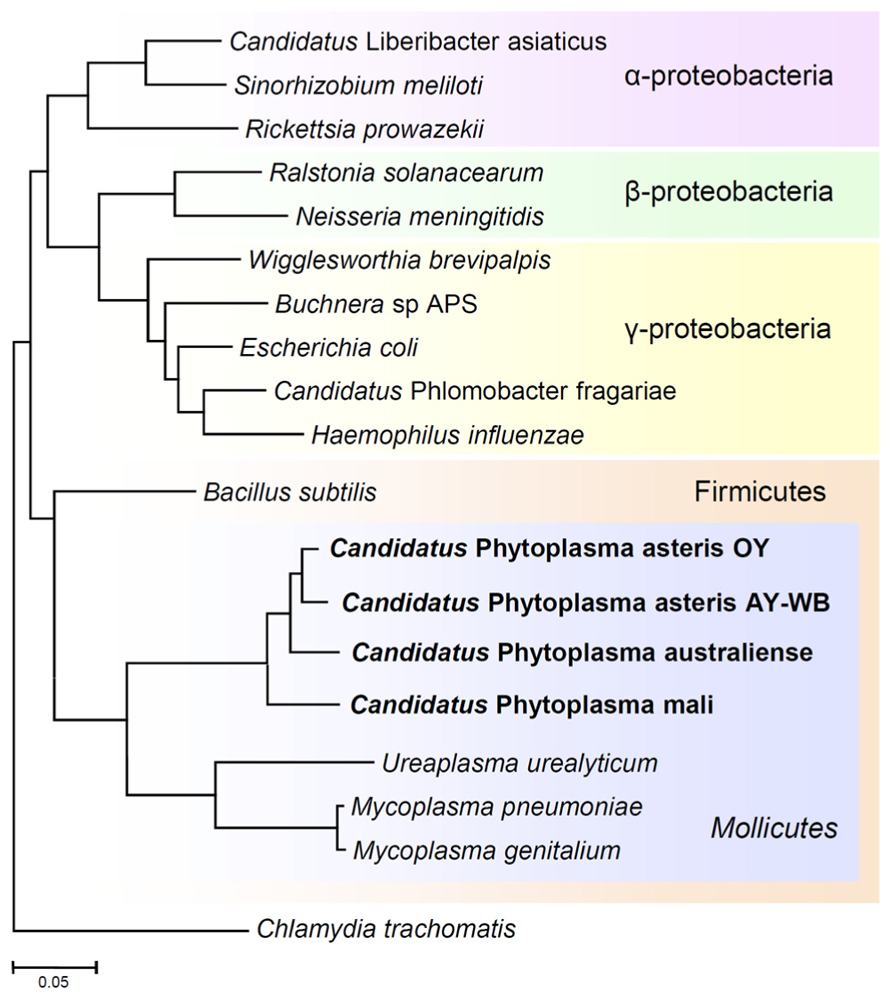
Phylogenetic position of Mollicutes among bacteria, using 16S rRNA sequences.

The results of Mollicutes phylogenetic analyses have been controversial. Some taxonomists place them in Bacillota, others in Mycoplasmatota. Woese et al. suggested that the Mollicutes might have been derived from different branches of bacteria. They concluded, that the Mollicutes are not a phylogenetically coherent group and therefore do not form a distinct higher level taxon. Instead, they cluster within Gram-positive bacteria of the phylum Bacillota. The results of molecular phylogenetic analyses have been partly dependent on the chosen molecular marker, like rRNA, elongation factor or another protein. Phylogenetic trees based on phosphoglycerate kinase (Pgk) amino acid sequences' indicated a monophyletic origin for the Mollicutes within the Bacillota.

An early edition of Bergey's Manual of Systematic Bacteriology placed class Mollicutes within phylum Bacillota, whereas in the announced 2nd edition, they are moved to a separate phylum Tenericutes (later renamed Mycoplasmatota). The change is motivated by "their unique phenotypic properties, in particular the lack of rigid cell walls, and the general low support by alternative markers". In the Taxonomic Outline of Bacteria and Archaea (TOBA Release 7.7), March 2007, the Mollicutes are a class in the phylum Bacillota.

Up-to-date analysis of the SSU (16S) rRNA puts Mollicutes in Bacillota (see LTP below). GTDB's 120-protein approach does the same (see below).

=== The 2018 Mycoplasma split ===
It has been known since the 1990s that Mycoplasma includes several groups that were not very related to its type species. Four lineages were defined by 2007.

In 2018, Gupta et al. re-circumscribed the genus Mycoplasma around M. mycoides. A total of 78 species were removed from Mycoplasma, creating five new genera and a number of higher taxonomic levels. Under this new scheme, a new family Mycoplasmoidaceae was created to correspond to the "pneumoniae" group, with M. pneumoniae and related species transferred to a new genus Mycoplasmoides. Another new family Metamycoplasmataceae was created to correspond to the "hominis" group. Both families belong to a new order Mycoplasmoitales, distinct from the Mycoplasmatales of Mycoplasma. The taxonomy was accepted by the ICSB with validation list 184 in 2018 and became the correct name. Both List of Prokaryotic names with Standing in Nomenclature (LPSN) and National Center for Biotechnology Information (NCBI) now use the new nomenclature.

Gupta's proposed taxonomy, as expected, moved the medically important "pneumoniae" group out of Mycoplasma into its own genus. As a result, a number of mycoplasmologists petitioned to the ICSB to reject the name in 2019. They argue that although Gupta's phylogenetic methods were likely solid, the proposed name changes are too sweeping to be practically adopted, citing some principles of the Code such as "name stability". Gupta and Oren wrote a rebuttal in 2020, further detailing the pre-existing taxonomic problems. In 2022, the ICSP's Judicial Opinion 122 ruled in favor of the name changes proposed by Gupta, meaning they remain valid under the Prokaryotic Code (and for the purpose of the LPSN, they remain the "correct names"). However, the older names also remain valid; their use remains acceptable under the Code.

Gupta et al. 2019 performed some uncontroversial sorting of the order Mycoplasmatales.

== Phylogeny ==
The currently accepted taxonomy is based on the List of Prokaryotic names with Standing in Nomenclature (LPSN) and National Center for Biotechnology Information (NCBI).

16S rRNA based LTP_10_2024

- - - Culicoidibacterales
      Culicoidibacteraceae
  - - Turicibacteraceae
    - Mollicutes
      - - Haloplasmatales
          Haloplasmataceae♦
      - - - Acholeplasmatales♦ /Anaeroplasmatales(1)
            - Anaeroplasmataceae
            - - Paracholeplasma
              - Acholeplasmataceae
        - (2)
          - Erysipelotrichales [incl. Asteroleplasma♦]
          - - Mycoplasmatales♦ /Entomoplasmatales
              - - - Spiroplasma~1
                  - Mycoplasmoidaceae
                - Mycoplasmataceae [incl.
                  Entomoplasmataceae; Spiroplasmataceae]
              - Metamycoplasmataceae [Mycoplasma~5]

120 marker proteins based GTDB 10-RS226

- - - - Mycoplasmatota Mollicutes
        - - - - "Aphodocolales" {RF39}
                "Aphodocolaceae" {UBA660}
            - - (1)
                - - "Bathyoplasmales" (sic) {MAG‑NZ}
                    "Bathyoplasmaceae" (sic) {MAG-NZ}
                - - "Izemoplasmatales"
                    "Izemoplasmataceae"
                  - Acholeplasmatales♦ /Anaeroplasmatales
                    - Anaeroplasmataceae
                    - - Paracholeplasma {UBA5453}
                      - Acholeplasmataceae
              - (2)
                - - - "Caccosomales" (sic) {RFN20}
                      - "Caccosomataceae" {CAG-631}
                      - - "Enterosomataceae" {CAG-288}
                        - "Enteromonadaceae" {CAG-826}
                  - Erysipelotrichales
                - - Mycoplasmatales♦ /Entomoplasmatales
                    - - Spiroplasma_D {VBWQ01}
                      - Mycoplasmataceae [incl.
                        Entomoplasmataceae; Spiroplasmataceae]
                    - - - "Ca. Spiroplasma holothuricola" {MT37}
                        - Mycoplasmoidaceae
                      - - "Hepatoplasmataceae"
                        - Metamycoplasmataceae
        - - Haloplasmatales
            Haloplasmataceae
      - MOL361
        Turicibacteraceae
    - Culicoidibacter
  - - "Staphylococcales"
      Staphylococcaceae

♦ Mollicutes

Mycoplasmatota and Mollicutes are not listed in GTDB, but they are recovered as a monophyletic node (marked in cladogram) in RS226 with a low non-parametric bootstrap support of 32%. In RS220, Haloplasmataceae was not grouped in under the same node as the rest of the Mollicutes.

The taxa labels only reflect an approximate match to the current taxonomy. An alternative match has what is labeled "Mollicutes" (or an inner node excluding Haloplasma, as this genus has a peptidoglycan cell wall) be "Mycoplasmatota", the node labelled "(1)" as Izemoplasmatia, and the node labelled as "(2)" as Mollicutes sensu stricto.

== Species which infect humans ==
Species in Mollicutes, other than those listed below, have been recovered from humans, but are assumed to have been contracted from a non-human host. The following species use humans as the primary host (modified for 2018 taxonomy):

- Malmycoplasma
  - Ma. penetrans
- Metamycoplasma
  - Me. buccale
  - Me. faucium
  - Me. hominis
  - Me. orale
  - Me. salivarium
- Mycoplasmoides
  - Md. amphoriforme
  - Md. genitalium
  - Md. pirum
  - Md. pneumoniae
- Mycoplasmopsis
  - Mp. fermentans
    - M. incognitus
  - Mp. lipophilum
  - Mp. primatum
  - Mp. spermatophilum

== Pathogenicity ==
Several species in Mollicutes can cause disease, including Md. pneumoniae, which is an important cause of atypical pneumonia (also known as "walking pneumonia"), and Md. genitalium, which has been associated with pelvic inflammatory diseases. Mycoplasma infections in humans are associated with skin eruptions in 17% of cases.

=== P1 antigen ===
The P1 antigen is the primary virulence factor of Mycoplasmoides. P1 is a membrane associated protein that allows adhesion to epithelial cells. The P1 receptor is also expressed on erythrocytes which can lead to autoantibody agglutination from mycobacteria infection.

=== Sexually transmitted infections ===
Ureaplasma, Malmycoplasma, and Metamycoplasma species are not part of the normal vaginal flora. Some Mollicutes species are spread through sexual contact. These species have a negative effect on fertility. Mollicutes species colonizing the human genital tract are:

- U. urealyticum
- Me. hominis
- Md. genitalium
- Ma. penetrans
- Mp. primatum (considered nonpathogenic)
- Mp. spermatophilum (considered nonpathogenic)

Me. hominis causes male sterility/Genitals inflammation in humans.

Mollicutes species have been isolated from women with bacterial vaginosis. Md. genitalium is found in women with pelvic inflammatory disease. In addition, infection is associated with increased risk of cervicitis, infertility, preterm birth, and spontaneous abortion. Mycoplasmoides genitalium has developed resistance to some antibiotics.

==== Infant disease ====
Low birth-weight, preterm infants are susceptible to Ureaplasma, Malmycoplasma, and Metamycoplasma infections. Malmycoplasma and Metamycoplasma species are associated with infant respiratory distress syndrome, bronchopulmonary dysplasia, and intraventricular hemorrhage in preterm infants.

=== Links to cancer ===
Several species in Mollicutes are frequently detected in different types of cancer cells. These species are:

- Mp. fermentans
- Md. genitalium
- Mesomycoplasma hyorhinis (Ms. hyorhinis hereafter)
- Ma. penetrans
- U. urealyticum

The majority of these Mollicutes species have shown a strong correlation to malignant transformation in mammalian cells in vitro.

==== Infection and host cell transformation ====
The presence of Mollicutes was first reported in samples of cancer tissue in the 1960s. Since then, several studies tried to find and prove the connection between Mollicutes and cancer, as well as how the bacterium might be involved in the formation of cancer. Several studies have shown that cells that are chronically infected with the bacteria go through a multistep transformation. The changes caused by chronic Mollicutes infections occur gradually and are both morphological and genetic. The first visual sign of infection is when the cells gradually shift from their normal form to sickle-shaped. They also become hyperchromatic due to an increase of DNA in the nucleus of the cells. In later stages, the cells lose the need for solid support to grow and proliferate, as well as the normal contact-dependent inhibition cells.

==== Possible intracellular mechanisms ====
===== Karyotypic changes related to infections =====
Cells infected with Mollicutes for an extended period of time show significant chromosomal abnormalities. These include the addition of chromosomes, the loss of entire chromosomes, partial loss of chromosomes, and chromosomal translocation. All of these genetic abnormalities may contribute to the process of malignant transformation. Chromosomal translocation and extra chromosomes help create abnormally high activity of certain proto-oncogenes, which caused by these genetic abnormalities and include those encoding c-myc, HRAS, and vav. The activity of proto-oncogenes is not the only cellular function that is affected; tumour suppressor genes are affected by the chromosomal changes induced by Mollicutes, as well. Partial or complete loss of chromosomes causes the loss of important genes involved in the regulation of cell proliferation. Two genes whose activities are markedly decreased during chronic infections with Mollicutes are the Rb and the p53 tumour suppressor genes. Another possible mechanism of carcinogenesis is RAC1 activation by a small GTPase-like protein fragment of Mycoplasmopsis pulmonis. A major feature that differentiates Mollicutes from other carcinogenic pathogens is that the Mollicutes do not cause the cellular changes by insertion of their own genetic material into the host cell. The exact mechanism by which the bacterium causes the changes is not yet known.

===== Partial reversibility of malignant transformations =====
The malignant transformation induced by Mollicutes species is also different from that caused by other pathogens in that the process is reversible. The state of reversal is, however, only possible up to a certain point during the infection. The window of time when reversibility is possible varies greatly; it depends primarily on the Mollicutes involved. In the case of Mp. fermentans, the transformation is reversible until around week 11 of infection and starts to become irreversible between weeks 11 and 18. If the bacteria are killed using antibiotics (i.e. ciprofloxacin or Clarithromycin) before the irreversible stage, the infected cells should return to normal.

==== Connections to cancer in vivo and future research ====
Epidemiologic, genetic, and molecular studies suggest infection and inflammation initiate certain cancers, including those of the prostate. Md. genitalium and Ms. hyorhinis induce malignant phenotype in benign human prostate cells (BPH-1) that were not tumorigenic after 19 weeks of exposure.

==== Types of cancer associated ====
Colon cancer: In a study to understand the effects of Mollicutes contamination on the quality of cultured human colon cancer cells, a positive correlation was found between the number of Ms. hyorhinis cells present in the sample and the percentage of CD133-positive cells (a glycoprotein with an unknown function).

Gastric cancer: Strong evidence indicates the infection of Ms. hyorhinis contributes to the development of cancer within the stomach and increases the likelihood of malignant cancer cell development.

Lung cancer: Studies on lung cancer have supported the belief that more than a coincidental positive correlation exists between the appearance of Mollicutes strains in patients and the infection with tumorigenesis.

Prostate cancer: p37, a protein encoded for by Ms. hyorhinis, has been found to promote the invasiveness of prostate cancer cells. The protein also causes the growth, morphology, and gene expression of the cells to change, causing them to become a more aggressive phenotype.

Renal cancer: Patients with renal cell carcinoma (RCC) exhibited a significantly high amount of Mollicutes sp. compared with the healthy control group. This suggests Mollicutes may play a role in the development of RCC.

== Laboratory contaminant ==
Mollicutes species are often found in research laboratories as contaminants in cell culture. Mollicutes cell culture contamination occurs due to contamination from individuals or contaminated cell culture medium ingredients. A 2002 report lists Me. orale, Ms. hyorhinis, Mp. arginini, Mp. fermentans, Me. hominis, and Acholeplasma laidlawii as the most common contaminants. Mollicutes cells are physically small – less than 1 μm, so are difficult to detect with a conventional microscope.

Mollicutes may induce cellular changes, including chromosome aberrations, changes in metabolism, and cell growth. Severe Mollicutes infections may destroy a cell line. Detection techniques include DNA probe, enzyme immunoassays, PCR, plating on sensitive agar, and staining with a DNA stain including DAPI or Hoechst.

An estimated 11–15% of U.S. laboratory cell cultures are contaminated with Mollicutes. A Corning study showed that half of U.S. scientists did not test for Mollicutes contamination in their cell cultures. The study also stated that, in former Czechoslovakia, 100% of cell cultures that were not routinely tested were contaminated while only 2% of those routinely tested were contaminated (study p. 6). Since the U.S. contamination rate was based on a study of companies that routinely checked for Mollicutes, the actual contamination rate may be higher. European contamination rates are higher and that of other countries are higher still (up to 80% of Japanese cell cultures). About 1% of published Gene Expression Omnibus data may have been compromised. Several antibiotic-containing formulations of antimycoplasmal reagents have been developed over the years.

== See also ==
- List of bacterial orders
- List of bacteria genera
