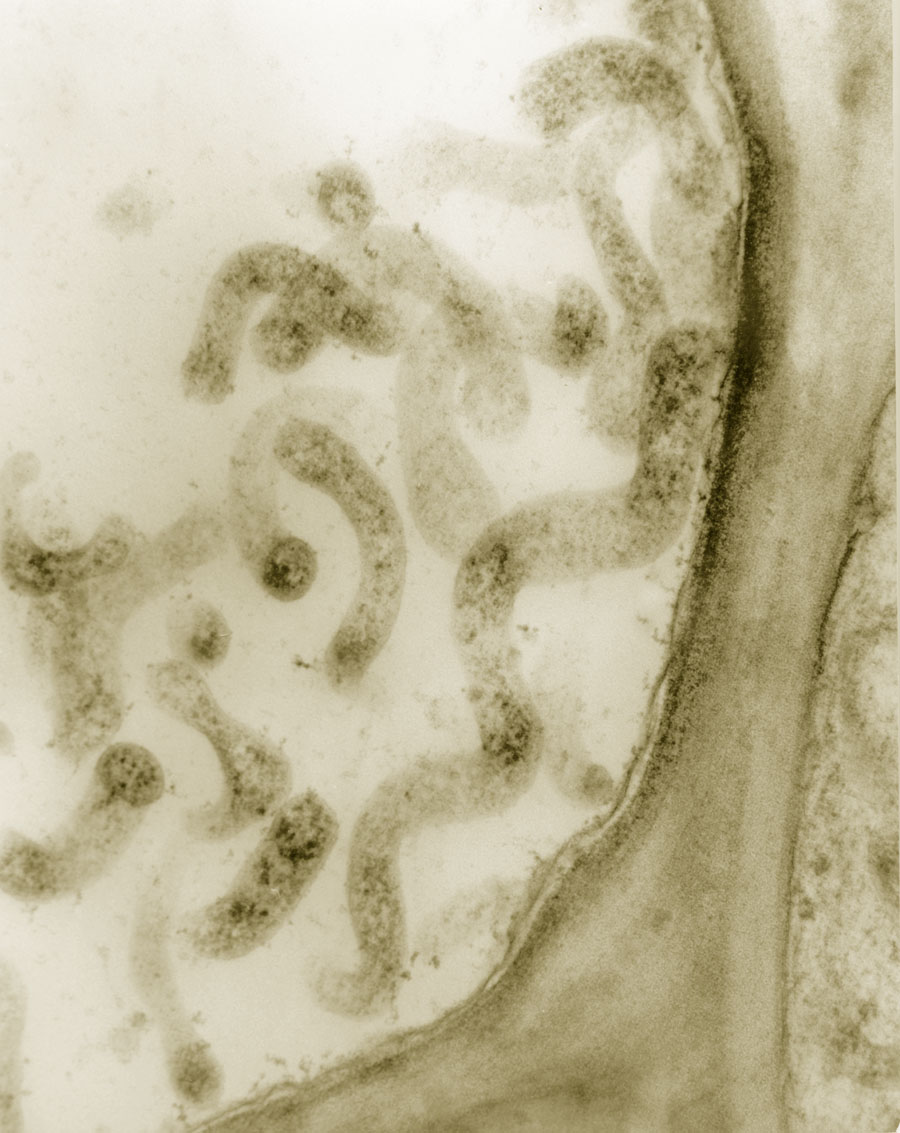
- Corn Stunt Spiroplasma in phloem cells. Thick section (0.4 micrometers) observed in a TEM. Magnified 75,000X.

Scientific classification
- Domain: Bacteria
- Kingdom: Bacillati
- Phylum: Mycoplasmatota
- Class: Mollicutes
- Order: Mycoplasmatales; Freundt, 1955

Synonyms
- Entomoplasmatales Tully et al. 1993

= Mycoplasmatales =

Order of bacteria

Mycoplasmatales is an order of bacteria in the class Mollicutes. The order consists of the families Spiroplasmataceae and Mycoplasmataceae.

As currently (2025) defined by LPSN, this class is synonymous to Entomoplasmatales, a class originally intended to include the arthropod-associated mollicutes. Newer phylogenetic studies have found that Entomoplasmatales was not monophyletic like Tully had believed, but paraphyletic. The family Entomoplasmataceae of Tully was also paraphyletic by the exclusion of Mycoplasma.

== Phylogeny ==
The currently accepted taxonomy is based on the List of Prokaryotic names with Standing in Nomenclature (LPSN) and National Center for Biotechnology Information (NCBI).

16S rRNA based LTP_10_2024

- - Metamycoplasmataceae
  - - Mycoplasmoidales
      - Spiroplasma~1
      - Mycoplasmoidaceae
    - Mycoplasmatales /Entomoplasmatales
      - Spiroplasma {Spiroplasmataceae}
      - - Spiroplasma species-group 2
        - - Mycoplasmataceae /Entomoplasmataceae
            - "Edwardiiplasma"
            - - Williamsoniiplasma
              - - "Tullyiplasma"
                - - - Entomoplasma
                    - Mesoplasma
                  - Mycoplasma

120 marker proteins based GTDB 09-RS220

- Mycoplasmatales sensu GTDB
  - Mycoplasmoidales sensu Gupta
    - - "Ca. Spiroplasma holothuricola" {MT37}
      - Mycoplasmoidaceae
    - - "Ca. Hepatoplasma" {"Hepatoplasmataceae"}
      - Metamycoplasmataceae
  - Mycoplasmatales sensu Gupta
    - VBWQ01
      Spiroplasma_D
    - Mycoplasmataceae sensu GTDB
      - Spiroplasma
      - - - Spiroplasma_B
          - Spiroplasma_A
        - Mycoplasmataceae sensu Gupta
          - "Edwardiiplasma"
          - - Williamsoniiplasma
            - - "Tullyiplasma"
              - - - Entomoplasma
                  - Mesoplasma
                - Mycoplasma
