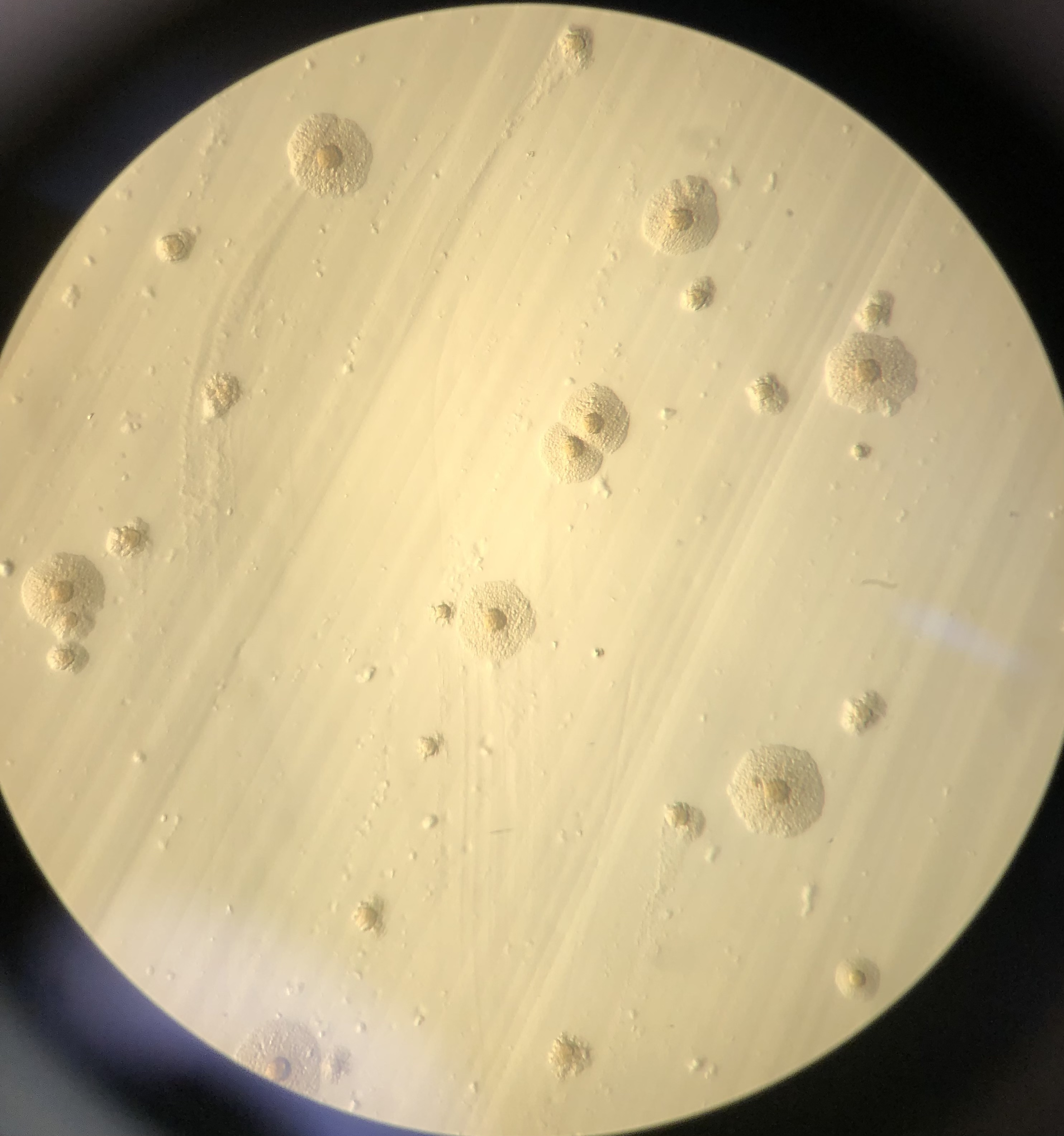
- Mycoplasma growth on Hayflick agar from a bovine mastitis infection sample

Scientific classification
- Domain: Bacteria
- Kingdom: Bacillati
- Phylum: Mycoplasmatota
- Class: Mollicutes
- Order: Mycoplasmatales
- Family: Mycoplasmataceae; Freundt, 1955

Genera
- "Edwardiiplasma"; Entomoplasma; "Ca. Mariplasma"; "Ca. Medusoplasma"; Mesoplasma; Mycoplasma; "Tullyiplasma"; "Ca. Vermiplasma"; Williamsoniiplasma

Synonyms
- "Borrelomycetaceae" Turner 1935; Entomoplasmataceae Tully et al. 1993; "Haemobartonellaceae" Yanokov 1973; "Parasitaceae" Sabin 1941; "Pleuropneumoniaceae" Tulasne & Brisou 1955

= Mycoplasmataceae =

Family of bacteria

Mycoplasmataceae is a family of bacteria in the order Mycoplasmatales. This family consists of Mycoplasma and four more genera.

In 1967, the order Mycoplasmatales was incorporated into the class Mollicutes. Sexually transmitted species and Ureaplasma are classified in Mycoplasmoidaceae since 2018.

== Taxonomy ==
=== Mycoplasma ===
Mycoplasma is a genus of bacteria that lack a cell wall and possess a three-layered cellular membrane. They can be parasitic or saprotrophic.

Several species formerly classified as Mycoplasma are sexually transmitted and pathogenic in humans (see Mollicutes § Species which infect humans). Others are found on cats, dogs, and barnyard fowl.

=== Taxa infecting insects ===
A few genera infecting insects were added to this family in 2019 using molecular phylogenetic evidence. These genera were originally called Entomoplasmataceae and believed to be monophyletic. However, work in 2019 found it to be a paraphyletic group by the exclusion of Mycoplasma. The two original genera (Mesoplasma and Entomoplasma) were also found to be in need of breaking up due to polyphyly. As a result five genera were finally added:

- Mesoplasma (formerly "Mesoplasma clade I")
- Entomoplasma (formerly "Entomoplasma clade I")
- Tullyiplasma (formerly "Mesoplasma clade II")
- Williamsoniiplasma (formerly "Entomoplasma clade II")
- Edwardiiplasma (formerly "Mesoplasma clade III")

== Phylogeny ==
The currently accepted taxonomy is based on the List of Prokaryotic names with Standing in Nomenclature (LPSN) and National Center for Biotechnology Information (NCBI).

16S rRNA based LTP_10_2024

- - Metamycoplasmataceae
  - - Mycoplasmoidales
      - Spiroplasma~1
      - Mycoplasmoidaceae
    - Mycoplasmatales
      - Spiroplasma {Spiroplasmataceae}
      - - Spiroplasma species-group 2
        - - Mycoplasmataceae /Entomoplasmataceae
            - "Edwardiiplasma"
            - - Williamsoniiplasma
              - - "Tullyiplasma"
                - - - Entomoplasma
                    - Mesoplasma
                  - Mycoplasma

120 marker proteins based GTDB 09-RS220

- Mycoplasmatales sensu GTDB
  - - - "Ca. Spiroplasma holothuricola" {MT37, Spiroplasma_C}
      - Mycoplasmoidaceae
    - - "Ca. Hepatoplasma" {"Hepatoplasmataceae"}
      - Metamycoplasmataceae
  - - VBWQ01
      Spiroplasma_D
    - Mycoplasmataceae sensu GTDB
      - Spiroplasma
      - - - Spiroplasma_B
          - Spiroplasma_A
        - Mycoplasmataceae sensu Gupta
          - "Edwardiiplasma"
          - - Williamsoniiplasma
            - - "Tullyiplasma"
              - - - Entomoplasma
                  - Mesoplasma
                - Mycoplasma

== See also ==
- List of bacterial orders
- List of bacteria genera
