= Mycoplasmatota =

Scientific classification
- Domain: Bacteria
- Kingdom: Bacillati
- Phylum: Mycoplasmatota; Murray 2021

Classes
- "Izemoplasmatia"; Mollicutes

Synonyms
- "Aphragmabacteria" Margulis & Schwartz 1982; "Mollicutaeota" Oren et al. 2015; "Mollicutota" Whitman et al. 2018; "Tenericuteota" Panda, Islam & Sharma 2022; "Tenericutes" Murray 1984 ex Brown 2010

Phylum of bacteria

Mycoplasmatota is a phylum of bacteria that contains the class Mollicutes. The phylum was originally named "Tenericutes" (tener cutis: soft skin). Notable genera include Mycoplasma, Spiroplasma, Ureaplasma, and Candidatus Phytoplasma. Moreover, it lacks a cell wall, its cells and genome sizes are small, and has a low guanine plus cytosine ratio. Due to being one of the smallest bacteria, animals are prone to a disease without showing any type of symptoms, thus serving as carriers and ultimately contribution to the spread of disease.

This phylum was first published as Tenericutes by Murray in a 1984 version of Bergey's Manual. It was republished in 2021 by Oren and Garrity under the revised Prokaryotic Code.

This phylum is not phylogenetically sound: it branches within Bacillota in phylogenomic and 16S analyses. See also Mollicutes § The phylum for Mollicutes.

== See also ==
- List of bacteria genera
- List of bacterial orders
