= GO Campaign =

U.S. nonprofit organization

GO Campaign is a national nonprofit organization based in Santa Monica, California, United States, that raises awareness and funds to help orphans and vulnerable children in the US and throughout the world. Founded in 2006, the organization supports projects at the grassroots level that bring direct relief to children in need of education and vocational training, medical care, enrichment programs, and basic human rights. The grants are executed by partnering with pioneering local leaders who are delivering local solutions. These are often projects that have not been able to garner the attention of larger grant-making organizations and where small grants can have great impact. In addition to funds, GO Campaign provides capacity-building expertise to help protect the sustainability and longevity of struggling grassroots nonprofits.

Actors Lily Collins, Evangeline Lilly, Ewan McGregor and Robert Pattinson are the organization's official ambassadors.

== Background ==
GO has funded children's programs in over 40 countries ranging from Haiti and Peru to Cambodia and Vietnam to Kenya and South Africa, impacting over 470,000 children. GO also funds programs for youth in the United States, in rural Mississippi, Chicago, Colorado, New York City, Native American reservations, and in Los Angeles. In April 2020, GO established a COVID-19 emergency fund to funnel donations quickly to address the urgent needs of children and families during the global COVID-19 crisis. Emergency grants from this fund provide food for families with no access to food in India's largest slum, groceries for families who have lost their income in the Watts section of Los Angeles, counseling services for children who have lost loved ones to the virus in Brooklyn NYC, sanitizer and medical supplies to children in a leper colony in Tanzania, home school supplies for children in one of Chicago's poorest neighborhoods, and more.

In September 2020, with funding from Beachbody Foundation, GO Campaign convened several of their local heroes working in the Watts community of Los Angeles and launched two "Safe Zones" to address the school closures of LAUSD due to COVID. Following all COVID safety precautions, this "Hands Across Watts Initiative" provides academic tutoring, access to the internet, STEM programming, and mental health counseling to children and youth who are at risk of falling behind due to lack of resources in the community.

In 2010, Malawi's William Kamkwamba, author of The Boy Who Harnessed the Wind, was one of four winners of GO Campaign's inaugural GO Ingenuity Award, a financial grant that allows inventors and artists to share ingenuity and invention with youth in developing nations.

In 2013, GO Campaign became the first US nonprofit to directly partner with the Recycled Orchestra of Cateura, subject of the documentary Landfill Harmonic.

In 2014, one of GO Campaign's local heroes from India, Kailash Satyarthi, won the Nobel Peace Prize, while other GO Campaign Local Heroes have been named as CNN Heroes.

GO projects around the world have been featured in Vogue (magazine), People (magazine) and 60 Minutes.

To celebrate its 10-year anniversary in 2016, GO's board of directors decided to amplify the work of one of their Tanzanian Local Heroes by committing to building a state-of-the-art centre for autistic and intellectually challenged children in Kilimanjaro. The new Gabriella Rehabilitation Centre opened its doors at the end of 2018, and had its official grand opening in 2019, welcoming children and young adults and their families from all over Africa.

In 2021, the Beachbody Foundation donated $1 million to GO Campaign to fund an inner city youth center on Chicago's South Side led by CNN Hero Jennifer Maddox for her local community organization Future Ties, serving hundreds of underserved children and families.

== Events ==
The GO Gala is GO Campaign's annual Hollywood fundraiser. Sponsored by Beachbody and other corporate sponsors, the event brings together celebrities, project partners from the field, social activists, supporters and top-rate entertainment. On occasion, GO Campaign presents an honoree with the Giving Opportunity Award at the Gala in recognition of their work for children throughout the developing world. Past recipients have included Cameron Sinclair, founder of Architecture for Humanity, Blake Mycoskie, founder of TOMS Shoes, Lauren Bush-Lauren and Ellen Gustafson, founders of FEED Projects, UN Human Rights Advocate Chris Mburu from the HBO documentary A Small Act, and anti-trafficking activist Ruchira Gupta. The 2011 gala hosted by Ewan McGregor included an online auction including a set visit to the Twilight Saga: Breaking Dawn movie set and meeting with the film's star Robert Pattinson which sold for $80,000. In 2011, Sumner Redstone donated $100,000 to GO Campaign for the building of two new schools in Cambodia. At the 2012 GO GO Gala co-hosted by Mike White, the grandchildren of Robert F. Kennedy presented Redstone with a special gift from Cambodia in recognition of his generosity. To date, Redstone has donated $350,000 to GO Campaign's efforts to help children around the world. The 2013 Gala was hosted by Adam Shankman and featured performances by Melissa Etheridge, Beth Behrs, and Dermot Mulroney, and guests included Robert Pattinson who was the high bidder on a cello made from recycled trash in Paraguay. Pattinson made a repeat appearance at the 2015 Gala, which was hosted by Ewan McGregor. Guests at the event included Katy Perry, Vin Diesel, Kate Hudson and Julia Ormond. The 2016 Gala featured a performance by Jackson Browne. 2017 Gala guests included Gal Gadot and Lily Collins. 2018's Gala speakers included Fifer, Pattinson, Collins, and Evangeline Lilly. The 2019 Gala was hosted by Robert Pattinson with a musical performance by Aloe Blacc and with guests John David Washington, Rami Malek, Paris Hilton, and Emily Ratajkowski attending. The Gala also featured the auction of two Vandal Gummy sculptures by artist WhIsBe as part of GO's work to raise awareness of gun violence against children in America.

The 2020 Gala was virtual and raised money for COVID-19 relief across the globe and for racial equality projects for youth across the USA. Hosted by GO's 3 ambassadors, the online Gala also featured Evangeline Lilly, Heidi Klum, HAIM, David Foster, Katharine McPhee, Judith Hill, Mary Elizabeth Winstead and French Thyme. 2021's virtual Gala included performances by Sia, MILCK, Jewel, a duet from Ewan McGregor and Mary Elizabeth Winstead, and a performance by Levi Evans. Sponsors included Beachbody, Dior, Lancome, Netflix, and Warner Media among others.

Smaller events have included GO Rocks at the Roxy, where youth bands take the stage along with accomplished artists such as Glenn Frey, Ziggy Marley, Don Was and Dennis Quaid; Cars & Casino hosted at TLC/ICON 4x4 (attended by Phoebe Dahl and then fiancée Ruby Rose in 2014 and hosted by Joel McHale in 2015; and hosted events at Soho House West Hollywood. In 2014, Ewan McGregor and his wife hosted an event for GO Campaign at FIKA NYC in Manhattan to celebrate his Broadway debut in The Real Thing.

In 2015, artist Shepard Fairey, who frequently deejays at the GO GO Gala, created a GO Campaign t-shirt for his company OBEY with profits from the shirts being donated to GO Campaign.

In 2015, McGregor and Pattinson became official ambassadors of GO Campaign. They were joined by Lily Collins in 2018, making her the first female ambassador of the organization. In 2024, Evangeline Lilly joined as the org's 4th ambassador.

In 2017, Facebook and Oculus announced that GO Campaign was selected by as one of only ten international charities to be championed in the 'VR for Good Creators Lab', with GO Campaign's work to be featured in an upcoming virtual film. The resulting film Children Do Not Play War was featured at the Tribeca Film Festival in 2019.

In 2018, Lupita Nyong'o posted on social media that GO Campaign was "near and dear to my heart". Included among GO Campaign's many projects is the SOM Chess Academy in Uganda, the subject of the Disney film Queen of Katwe. Nyong'o also spoke at the 2021 GO Campaign virtual Gala, celebrating GO's 15 year anniversary.

In December 2021, Robert Pattinson announced an auction on Omaze to benefit GO Campaign, the winner meeting him at the red carpet premiere of his movie The Batman in February 2022.

The 2022 Gala was hosted in downtown Los Angeles by Lily Collins with sponsors including Netflix, Dior, Discovery Warner, Lancôme, Peacock, and the Congdon Family Foundation among others. The evening highlighted GO's work for inner-city youth from Watts to Chicago.

GO's 2023 GO Gala was hosted by Robert Pattinson. Attendees included Suki Waterhouse, Lupita Nyong'o and Robin Wright, among others. Sponsors included Morphus, Dior, Warner Bros. Discovery, Lancôme, Urban Mystic and others. The evening featured GO's Local Heroes from Watts and from the Congo.

GO's 2024 Gala was hosted by Ewan McGregor and his wife Mary Elizabeth Winstead, attendees included Gerard Butler and Tony Curran and featured a performance by Ewan, Mary, and the Recycled Orchestra of Paraguay.

GO's 2025 Gala honored Rob McElhenney, Ryan Reynolds and Wrexham A.F.C. for their work bringing sports to underprivileged youth. Guests included Judith Hill, Kaitlin Olsen, Danny DeVito, Glenn Howerton, Kristen Bell, Dax Shepard, and Ally Walker. The Gala raised over $1,000,000 for grassroots programs benefiting children around the globe.

In 2026, Lily Collins raised money for GO at the Desert Smash celebrity pickleball event in Palm Springs, CA by auctioning off a set visit to meet her in-laws Ted Danson and Mary Steenburgen on the set of the TV series Inside Man.
