= International Panel of Experts on Sustainable Food Systems =

International food system organization

The International Panel of Experts on Sustainable Food Systems (IPES-Food) is an international non-profit association, with the goal to promote transition to sustainable food systems around the world and it was registered in Belgium in the year 2015. It was founded by Daniel et Nina Carasso, Olivier De Schutter, former UN special rapporteur on the right to food, and Emile Frison, former Director General of Bioversity International to inform debates on food system reforms around the world. It conducts research focused in the domains of political economy, nutrition, climate change, ecology, agronomy, agroecology, and economics, as well as direct involvement in political processes.

== History ==
IPES-Food is an international non-profit organization (“AISBL” in French) under Belgian law. It is composed of 24 panel members from different disciplines, including environmental scientists, development economists, nutritionists, agronomists, and sociologists, as well as experienced practitioners from civil society and social movements, originating from 18 countries across 5 continents.

The panel is co-chaired by Olivier De Schutter, who is also UN Special Rapporteur on extreme poverty and human rights, and Lim Li Ching, a senior researcher at Third World Network. 22 further panel members form its General Assembly: Bina Agarwal, Molly Anderson, Jane Battersby, Million Belay, Nicolas Bricas, Joji Carino, Susan Chomba, Jennifer Clapp, Mamadou Goïta, Emile Frison, Shalmali Guttal, Hans Herren, Phil Howard, Melissa Leach, Desmond McNeill, Sofía Monsalve Suárez, Pat Mooney, Raj Patel, Elisabetta Recine, Ricardo Salvador, Jomo Sundaram, Nettie Wiebe. Prominent past members of the panel include: Johan Rockström, Claude Fischler, Martin Kohr, Corinna Hawkes. The experts are appointed by invitation, for a three-year renewable mandate.

An administrative council is the executive body of the association, and is composed of the two co-chairs plus one to three members elected by the panel. It is supported by a small secretariat of 5 staff located in Brussels, under the responsibility of the co-chairs of IPES-Food.

IPES-Food's work is guided by four principles: a holistic approach that addresses food systems in their entirety; a sustainability approach that includes environmental, health, social, cultural, and economic dimensions; a political economy approach that recognizes the power relations and influences exercised by actors within the food system; and a democratic approach to knowledge that identifies the value of state-of-the-art research in natural and social sciences, while recognizing the importance of experiential, indigenous and traditional knowledge.

The main way in which IPES-Food seeks to achieve change is by preparing and disseminating reports on different aspects of the global food system, which are rigorous in both empirical and analytical terms. These reports are heavily critical of the productivist approach to agriculture, demonstrating its negative impacts on the environment and human wellbeing. IPES-Food has advocated for agroecology.

== Notable publications ==
- “The New Science of Sustainable Food Systems” (2015) calls for a joined-up picture of food systems and their political economy as a unit of analysis.
- “From Uniformity to Diversity” (2016) argues for a paradigm shift from industrial agriculture to diversified agroecological systems, and identifies ‘lock-ins’ blocking this transition.
- “Too Big To Feed” (2017) explores the impacts of mega-mergers, consolidation and concentration of power in the agri-food sector.
- “Unraveling the Food-Health Nexus” (2017) co-developed with the Global Alliance for the Future of Food, provides insight into the health impacts of industrial food systems and highlights the need for significant human health reforms.
- “What Makes Urban Food Policy Happen?” (2017) draws lessons from five cities on how to overcome barriers to implementing sustainable food policies at the municipal level.
- “Breaking away from industrial food and farming systems” (2018) compiles case studies of seven experiences of agroecological transitions around the world.
- “Towards a Common Food Policy for the EU” (2019) proposes a Common Food Policy for the European Union to replace the Common Agriculture Policy, with policy reforms required in order to deliver sustainable food systems. It draws on the collective intelligence of more than 400 farmers, food entrepreneurs, civil society activists, scientists and policymakers consulted through a three-year process of research and deliberation. This report was endorsed by the European Parliament in a motion adopted in 2021 in favor of a EU farm to fork strategy.
- “COVID-19 and the Crisis in Food Systems” (2020) draws insights from the weaknesses and inequalities in food systems exposed by the COVID-19 pandemic, and proposes structural reforms to build resilience to future shocks.
- “Money Flows: What is holding back investment in agroecological research for Africa?” (2020) co-developed with Biovision and the Institute of Development Studies, analyzes financial flows in food and agricultural research in sub-Saharan Africa.
- “The Added Value(s) of Agroecology: Unlocking the potential for transition in West Africa” (2020) identifies eight key obstacles to agroecology in West Africa, but also four leverage points. It draws on a three-year participatory research process with family farmers, researchers and policymakers in West Africa.
- “A Long Food Movement: transforming food systems by 2045” (2021) published with ETC Group lays out a series of strategies for the food movement to build sustainable food systems over 25 years.
- “The Politics of Protein” (2022) scrutinizes key claims about the future of protein (including livestock and alternative proteins), identifies five ways in which these claims result in oversimplified discussions, and sets out recommendations to reduce polarization.
- “Another Perfect Storm?” (2022) takes stock of the impacts of the Russian invasion of Ukraine on global food security, highlighting the vicious cycles of climate change, conflict, poverty, and food insecurity that are leaving millions of people highly vulnerable to shocks.
- “Smoke and Mirrors” (2022) examines competing framings of food system sustainability: agroecology, regenerative agriculture, and nature-based solutions.
- “Breaking the Cycle of Unsustainable Food Systems, Hunger, and Debt” (2023) identifies unsustainable food systems as a critical factor behind rising debt and hunger today
- “Who’s Tipping the Scales?” (2023) examines the implications of the growing influence of large agribusiness corporations on the international governance of food systems for people and the planet, criticizing multi-stakeholder governance.

== Events ==
At the 2021 U.N. Climate Conference (COP26) in Glasgow, IPES-Food launched the Glasgow Food and Climate Declaration alongside 100 regional and subnational governments pledging to tackle the climate crisis through integrated food policies. During the 2022 U.N. Climate Conference (COP27) in Sharm El-Sheikh, Egypt, IPES-Food partnered with the Food4Climate Pavilion with Food Tank, Compassion in World Farming, FOUR PAWS, and ProVeg International.

In 2023, IPES-Food partnered with Compassion in World Farming and the Institute of Development Studies for the second Extinction Or Regeneration conference on Transforming food systems for human, animal and planetary health.

== Funding ==
IPES-Food receives funding from the Fondation Daniel et Nina Carasso, the Fondation Charles Léopold Mayer pour le progrès de l'Homme, the 11th Hour Foundation, and Rosa Luxemburg Foundation. It does not accept funding from governments or corporations, allowing the panel to deliver independent analysis.
