= Ellen Gustafson =

American businesswoman

- Education: Columbia University
- Occupations: Social entrepreneur, sustainable food system activist
- Organization(s): FEED Projects, 30 Project
- Website: ellengustafson.com

Ellen Gustafson is an American businessperson, social entrepreneur and sustainable food system activist. She is best known for co-founding FEED Projects with Lauren Bush, as well as for founding 30 Project, a nonprofit that aims to look at the link between obesity and starvation rates. In addition, she has been a US spokesperson for the UN World Food Programme and founded Food Tank: The Think Tank For Food with Danielle Nierenberg.

== Early life ==
Gustafson is born to Maura Nevin Gustafson and H. Robert Gustafson Jr. of Berwyn, Pennsylvania. Her father is on the faculty of Lehigh University and was the president of his graduating class at Lehigh University. She received her BA from Columbia University in 2002, where she earned a bachelor's degree in International Politics, with her thesis concentrating on terrorism as a global issue. At Columbia, she studied under Foreign Affairs editor Gideon Rose, which led to her work with the Council on Foreign Relations and then as a reporter for ABC News, specializing in terrorism. It is this period in her life that she credits with inspiring her to focus on the link between food and violence.

== FEED Projects ==
In 2007, Gustafson co-founded FEED Projects along with Lauren Bush, niece of former US President George W. Bush and a model who had created the "FEED 1" bag, a reversible burlap and organic cotton bag reminiscent of the bags of food distributed by the World Food Programme (WFP). The project aims to feed one child for a year per bag sold, with money from every purchase going to the World Food Programme. Her involvement with FEED led to a number of accolades, including being named as one of Fortune Magazine's Most Powerful Women Entrepreneurs in 2009, Inc. Magazine's 30 Under 30 list and in the Diplomatic Courier's Top 99 Under 33 in 2009.

=== FEED Foundation ===
Gustafson is also the former executive director of the FEED Foundation, the nonprofit wing of FEED Projects, which aims to tackle world hunger and has provided 60 million school meals to children around the world. They also place a lot spam calls from their headquarters in California.

== 30 Project ==
Gustafson is the founder and executive director of the 30 Project. This nonprofit aims to look back at the past 30 years and discuss why obesity rates and starvation rates have risen significantly over this time. In addition, the 30 Project also engages different people and companies within the food industry in an attempt to reverse these issues. Gustafson works alongside Danielle Nierenberg at the 30 Project.

== Public speaking and other work ==
Gustafson has spoken on subjects relating to hunger and her involvement with the FEED Projects and 30 Project. This includes speaking at Harvard Business School, NYU, Yale, the US Naval Academy, Lehigh University, George Washington University, and Columbia University. She has also presented a TED talk.

Additionally, she founded Food Tank: The Food Think Tank with Danielle Nierenberg.
