= Danielle Nierenberg =

American activist, author, and journalist

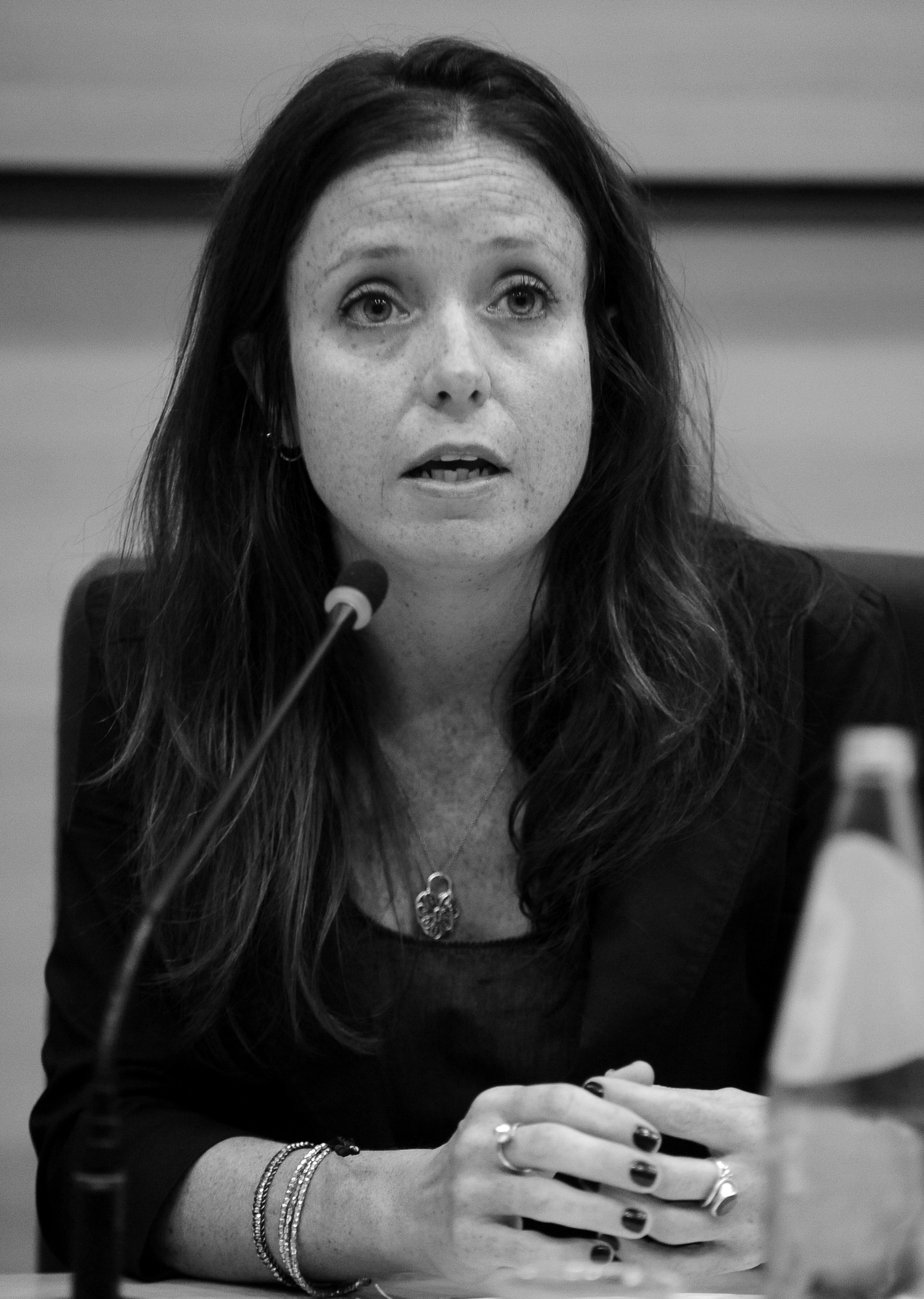
- Danielle Nierenberg in 2012
- Born: Defiance, Missouri
- Other name: Dani Nierenberg
- Education: Tufts University; Monmouth College
- Occupations: Author, journalist
- Website: daniellenierenberg.com

Danielle J. Nierenberg is an American activist, author and journalist.

In 2013 Nierenberg co-founded Food Tank: The Think Tank For Food and currently serves as its president. She founded Nourishing the Planet while working at the Worldwatch Institute.

Nierenberg is also one of NYU Steinhardt's 2022 Scholars in Residence, a program that welcomes distinguished academics, artists, advocates, and other thought leaders to our community to share their expertise.

== Early life and education ==
Nierenberg was born and raised in Defiance, Missouri. She holds an MSc in agriculture, food, and environment from Tufts University and a B.A. in environmental policy from Monmouth College, Illinois.

== Career ==
After she completed her education at Monmouth College, Nierenberg joined the Peace Corps as a volunteer in the Dominican Republic and worked with farmers and urban school kids. Since then, she has been working to highlight how the food system can become more sustainable. Following her volunteer work in the Peace Corps, she matriculated at Tufts University and then joined Science and Environmental Health Network as an intern. Later on she joined Worldwatch Institute.

According to Nierenberg, she has been focused on raising awareness about food quality and availability because she "is obsessed with food." She wants "to know what she's having for dinner at lunchtime." She is a reviewer for the Africa Chapter for the Intergovernmental Panel on Climate Change WGII AR5 First Order Draft and serves on the Advisory Group for The Zero Hunger | Zero Waste Foundation. In 2013, she joined the Young Professional's Platform for Agricultural Research for Development (YPARD) Steering Committee. Nierenberg is also a member of the UN Environmental Programme's Economics of Ecosystems and Biodiversity Steering Committee.

=== Worldwatch Institute ===
In 2001, Nierenberg joined the Worldwatch Institute as its Food and Agricultural Senior Researcher, where she managed several research projects on emerging infectious diseases related to the food system, gender and population, climate change and agriculture, the global meat economy, and innovations in sustainable agriculture.

In 2009 she co-founded the Nourishing the Planet project housed at the Worldwatch Institute and became its director. This post involved overseeing environmental research, communications and development for the Nourishing the Planet project, as well as leading the Nourishing the Planet Advisory Group. As part of this role, Nierenberg spent 18 months in Sub-Saharan Africa, looking for solutions to poverty and hunger in 30 different countries. While working there, she managed a grant of US$1.34 million to assess the state of agricultural innovations.

Nierenberg produced State of the World 2011 with the help of 60 international authors. She also organized The State of the World Symposium in January 2011. She left Worldwatch Institute and Nourishing The Planet in 2012.

=== Food Tank ===
In 2013, Nierenberg co-founded Food Tank: The Think Tank For Food, a non-profit organization. The organization aims to offer solutions and environmentally sustainable ways of alleviating hunger, obesity, and poverty by creating a network of connections and information. The organization's inaugural Food Tank Summit was held in January 2015 in partnership with The George Washington University. In 2016, the series expanded to Sacramento, CA, São Paulo, Brazil, and Chicago, IL.

The organization was the official North American Partner of the United Nations' International Year of Family Farming with the UN Food and Agriculture Organization, the Global Forum on Agricultural Research, and the International Fund for Agricultural Development (IFAD).

As part of her role at Food Tank, Nierenberg is routinely interviewed in major media as an expert on issues such as food waste, food and artificial intelligence, food insecurity, the meat industry, food and technology, hunger and obesity, food trends, nutrient density, the COVID-19 pandemic's impact on the food system, Indigenous crops, food labeling/expiration dates, urban agriculture, and women in the food system.

In 2022, Food Tank convened an official listening session in the lead-up to the White House Conference on Hunger, Nutrition and Health. Exploring the theme "Dismantling Silos to Strengthen Nutrition and Food Security Research," the session's key takeaways were compiled into a formal report for the White House's consideration as they develop a strategy to end hunger, increase healthy eating and physical activity, and eliminate disparities.

Food Tank joined a coalition of non-governmental organizations and institutions including the Harvard Law School Food Law and Policy Clinic, WeightWatchers International Inc., Grubhub and the Natural Resources Defense Council to help build bipartisan support for the Food Donation Improvement Act, which was signed into law in January 2023. Food Tank's efforts included convening an event on Capitol Hill in partnership with WW, Bread for the World, the Harvard Law School Food Law and Policy Clinic (FLPC), and The Healthy Living Coalition where lawmakers, policy experts, and advocates fighting food waste called on Congress to pass the legislation.

Food Tank also partnered with all official food pavilions at the U.N. Climate Conference (COP27) in Sharm El-Sheikh, Egypt, including the Food4Climate Pavilion with A Well-Fed World, Compassion in World Farming, Four Paws, IPES-Food (International Panel of Experts on Sustainable Food Systems) and ProVeg International; the Food Systems Pavilion with Clim-Eat and 15 other partners; and the Food and Agriculture Pavilion with CGIAR, the U.N. Food and Agriculture Organization, and The Rockefeller Foundation.

=== Published work ===
Nierenberg has written extensively on gender and population, the spread of factory farming in the developing world, and innovations in sustainable agriculture.

She has also written for The Wall Street Journal, The New York Times, the Chicago Tribune, USA Today, The China Daily. The Washington Post, Le Monde, Bloomberg Businessweek, MSNBC, Al Jazeera, the Australian Broadcasting Corporation, the International Herald Tribune, BBC, MSNBC, Fox News, CNN, The Guardian (UK), The Telegraph (UK), Voice of America, The Times of India, and The Sydney Morning Herald.

Nierenberg's first book was titled Correcting Gender Myopia: Gender Equity, Women's Welfare, and the Environment and was published by the Worldwatch Institute in 2002. In 2005, she wrote Happier Meals: Rethinking the Global Meat Industry, presenting the effects of the growth of factory farming and cataloging the harmful effects it can have on the world, especially in developing countries. In 2012, she wrote Eating Planet 2012, which was presented during an event at the Literature Festival in Mantua in September.

In partnership with the James Beard Foundation, Nierenberg and Food Tank publish an annual Good Food Org Guide, a directory of non-profit organizations working for a better food system

Nierenberg writes a Forbes column around sustainable agriculture and food issues, which has covered topics like agroecology, food waste, and the U.N. Climate Conference.

=== Awards ===
In 2020, Nierenberg was granted the Julia Child Award by the Julia Child Foundation for Gastronomy and the Culinary Arts for making a "profound and significant difference in how America cooks, eats, and drinks." In 2022, Nierenberg was presented the NYC Food Policy Changemaker Award by the Hunter College NYC Food Policy Center for her influential work in food systems and sustainability. Nierenberg was also one of the NYU Steinhardt 2022 Scholars in Residence, a program that "welcomes distinguished academics, artists, advocates, and other thought leaders to our community to share their expertise." In 2024, she was honored by her alma mater, Monmouth College, with the Monmouth College Distinguished Alumnus Award for her impactful leadership in sustainable agriculture and food systems advocacy.

=== Podcast ===
Nierenberg hosts the podcast "Food Talk with Dani Nierenberg," interviewing leaders in food such as Michael Pollan, Questlove, Michael Moss, José Andrés, Tom Colicchio, Dan Barber, Mark Hyman, and hundreds more since 2018.

== Writings ==
- Correcting Gender Myopia: Gender Equity, Women's Welfare, and the Environment (2002) ISBN 978-1878071644
- Happier Meals: Rethinking the Global Meat Industry (2005) ISBN 978-1878071774
- State of the World 2007 (Chapter 3 – Farming the Cities) (2007) ISBN 978-0393329230
- State of the World 2011: Innovations that Nourish the Planet (2011) ISBN 978-0393338805
- Eating Planet–Nutrition Today: A Challenge for Mankind and for the Planet (2012) ISBN 978-8866270294
- 17 Big Bets for a Better World (2016) ISBN 978-8793229549
- Letters to a Young Farmer: On Food, Farming, and Our Future (2017) ISBN 978-1616895303
- Eating Planet 2016 (2016)
- Food and Agriculture: The Future of Sustainability (2012)

She has also written on sustainable agriculture, in The Guardian, Bloomberg Businessweek, and the Huffington Post. and has had opinion-editorials published in the largest circulating newspapers in 40 states and also The New York Times, The Wall Street Journal, USA Today The China Daily. She routinely appears in major broadcast media including MSNBC, Fox News and Al Jazeera.
