= Synthetic Gene Database =

SGDB

Content
- Description: synthetic genes re-designed for optimizing protein over-expression.

Contact
- Primary citation: Wu & al. (2007)
- Release date: 2006

Access
- Website: http://www.umbc.edu/codon/sgdb/index.php

The Synthetic Gene Database (SGDB) is a database of artificially engineered genes.

== See also ==
- Gene
