= Agroecology in West Africa =

A number of movements seek to expand the practice of agroecology in West Africa. Agroecology is a scientific discipline, movement and practice that integrates ecology in agriculture with strong emphasis on diversification, food sovereignty, energy efficiency and sustainability. Agroecological practices apply the systems and knowledge that traditional farmers in the region have developed and inherited. The agroecological social movement empowers smallholder farmers that hold the knowledge of indigenous farming systems, however are recently engulfed by larger farms or are migrating to urban areas, looking for better paying jobs.

Smallholder farmers constitutes a substantial percentage of the population and agriculture makes up a large portion of GDP in many West African countries with some variation. The agricultural sector constitutes 35% of West African GDP and employs 65% of the population. At the same time, small farmers in the rural areas of West African countries face the economical, social and political challenges. There have been agroecological movements in West Africa led by international organizations such as La Via Campesina, The International Panel of Experts on Sustainable Food Systems (IPES-Food), Agronomes et Vétérinaires Sans Frontières, Groundswell, and ILEIA(Centre for Learning on Sustainable Agriculture) as well as regional organizations such as ROPPA (Réseau des organisations paysannes et de producteurs de l'Afrique de l'Ouest) and ECOWAS (Economic Community of West African States).

== Background ==
=== Emergence of agroecology ===
Agroecology is a concept first emerged during the 1930s, expanded as a discipline of science during the 1970s and 1980s, and was institutionalized in the 1990s. There has been an increasing number of publications related to agroecology since the 2000s. Agroecology as a movement was especially developed in the US and in Latin America, in reconsideration of the relationship between agriculture and the society and in response to the consequences of the Green Revolution. In 2018, FAO published a report for scaling up agroecology initiative globally, to meet the agenda of SDG 2, Zero Hunger.

=== History ===
The 20th Century model of the Green Revolution was introduced to West Africa by Rockefeller Foundation and Bill and Melinda Gates Foundation in 2006. However the model that requires heavy inputs of machines, fertilizers, and other resources was not sustainable and strangled the small farmers. In February 2015, a global peasant alliance, La Via Campesina and Confederation of Peasants Organizations of Mali (CNOP) held the International Forum on Agroecology in Sélingué, south Mali, aiming to reinforce the shared vision of agroecology and synergy of a variety of sectors including farmers, workers, indigenous peoples, nomads, fisherfolk, consumers, the urban poor, etc. to induce a bottom-up approach of transformation.

In April 2018, 8 million euros was budgeted for the Agro-ecological Transition Support Project in West Africa (AETSP) coordinated by Regional Agency for Agriculture and Food (ARAA) of ECOWAS, covering Côte d'Ivoire, Burkina Faso, Mali, Senegal and Togo for 4 years. At the West African multi-stakeholder conference organized by the ROPPA and IPES-Food held in Dakar the same month, the Alliance for Agroecology in West Africa was formed with the purpose to further promote agroecological transition in West Africa, encourage cooperation between varied scales of research institutes, NGOs, farmers' organizations and social movements, and empower agroecological movements in West Africa. In January 2020, the alliance hosted a meeting in Dakar to finalize the extensive action plan to actualize agroecology in West Africa, where institutions such as FAO, IFAD, and DG DEVCO of the European Commission and donor organizations from Germany and France also participated actively.

=== Principles ===
The principle of agroecology is to apply the systems that traditional farmers in the region have developed and inherited. Agroecologists argue that such complex and diversifying farming systems help small farmers to survive harsh environments and produce what is necessary for subsistence with minimum usage of external inputs. La Via Campesina and other agroecological organizations claim that free trade policies and industrialized agricultural system with heavy use of chemicals and imported inputs destroys the environment, diminish resources, and disturb the health and wellbeing of small farmers that are large portion of the West African population as well as the consumers. The Declaration of the International Forum for Agroecology at Nyéléni in Mali (2015) suggests that the solution to the climate change, malnutrition and other issues that West African countries are facing needs to come from transforming the industrial model and build the local food systems with new rural-urban links, with agroecological food production by peasants, artisanal fishers, pastoralists, indigenous peoples, urban farmers, etc.

== Agroecological practices in the region ==
The types of agroecological practices existing in the region includes diversification, cropping associations and sequences, agroforestry, crop and livestock integration, management and conservation of soils and water, biological control and other pesticide alternatives, and peasant seeds, with the combination of traditional and more recently innovated practices, either native to the region or imported.

An example of agroecological practices in West Africa is Zaï, a traditional water harvesting technique that was revived in Mali and Burkina Faso. Farmers fill zaï or holes in the ground with organic matter, which induces fertilization and draws termites that improve the soil structure, leading to penetration of water that will be held in the soil. The farmers grow millet or sorghum in the zaï, which would be harvested, leaving the stalks with some height so that the young trees are protected from animals. The thousands of farmers in Yatenga region of Burkina Faso refined this technique and revived their land, which resulted in increasing the yields of cereal harvest per hector.

== Impacts ==
=== Socio-economic Impacts ===
A research by AVSF in their CALAO project has shown positive impact of agroecological practices on agricultural income, generating two or three times higher income per working family for same surface area, compared to families that are not practicing agroecology. For example, an evaluation of the farming practice in Senegal comparing farms on the scale of the same surface area and climate environment indicates that the traditional Sérère practice of integration of agriculture and animal husbandry results in higher agricultural income per worker compared to a group of farms that do not follow this practice but have larger land and fairy equipped holdings. The former type of farms produce agricultural income average of 809,000 FCFA per a year with land availability of 1.5 ha, while the latter farms produced the average of 215,000 FCFA per a year within the same amount of land surface.

The same report also denote that labour intensiveness of agroecology can contribute to the improvement of underemployment, which is seen in areas researched in the report (parts of Burkina Faso, Senegal and Togo).

=== Environmental Impacts ===
The environmental benefits of agroecological practices in the region is still not significantly visual. There has been positive impact of the fertility of soils and carbon capture in soils. In Senegal, agroecological practices has had positive impacts on reforestation and increasing biodiversity according to the research by AVSF.

== Challenges and critiques ==
=== Challenges ===
There are challenges that the movement faces and limits the development of the practices in the region.

- Farmers may not find short-term benefits in applying agroecological practices.
- The transmission of traditional knowledge may be discontinued, and spreading the knowledge and practices brought by outside organizations can be overly complex.
- Difficulty in initiating the growth process due to the necessity for heavy labour.
- Access to water necessary for agricultural practices in dry areas.
- Availability and access to production capital and favorable environment for the agroecological transition.
- Public policies favoring agri-business and export oriented economy may come in the way of the transition.
- Agroecological transformation in West Africa requires coherent interventions of public policies.

== Organizations ==
=== ROPPA ===
ROPPA, which stands for Réseau des organisations paysannes et de producteurs de l'Afrique de l'Ouest, meaning "Network of West African Farmer Organizations and Agricultural Producers" is an initiative specific to farmers and agricultural producers in West Africa, launched in Cotonou, June 2000. There are 13 member national farmer organizations including Benin, Burkina Faso, Côte d'Ivoire, Gambia, Ghana, Guinea, Bissau Guinea, Liberia, Mali, Niger, Senegal, Sierra Leone, and Togo, and 2 associated member farmer organizations from Cap-Verde and Nigeria.

The purpose of the organization is the improvement of rural family's working conditions and the protection and advocacy of small farms which are the main structure of agricultural production in West Africa. The organization also aims to influence policies that enhance liberalization of the economy and socioeconomic development in West Africa, based on socially and environmentally sustainable agriculture, sustainable management of natural resources, and decent incomes and jobs in rural areas. ROPPA address the issues in the current agricultural industry in West Africa as lack of long-term funding to support the improvement of production, lack of decent income for production thus not enough pressures on the use of natural resources, lack of decent socioeconomic infrastructures in the rural areas, and the need to work on the capacity building of farmers.

The main principles of operation are

- Achieve peasant solidarity through the inclusion of all categories of peasant organizations and agricultural producers in the member states and support their recognition of identity, their rights and roles.
- Consensus is the preferred method of decision making.
- Maintain transparency by reporting and updating mandates regularly.

ROPPA published in June 2016, their vision on the "Capitalization of Economic and Agroecological Initiatives from Farmers Organizations in Africa", in which they stated their priorities to be

1. Promotion of local products and local consumption.
2. Establishing the structure that benefits the weakest stakeholders in the value chains, such as small family farms and female farmers.
3. Agroecological intensification.
4. Financial support and intermediation of family farms and capacity building of farmers.

=== JAFOWA ===
JAFOWA (The Joint Action for Farmers' Organisations in West Africa) aims to enable joint actions of small farmers, pastoralists and fishers in West Africa, to establish and manage local food systems. JAFOWA is an action by Fondation de France, Compagnia di San Paolo, Fondazione Cariplo and Foundation for a Just Society, and is operated by the Network of European Foundations. The purpose of JAFOWA is to back up farmers organizations through grants, sharing of knowledge, aiding in capacity development, proposes local and regional policies, and encourages ecological solutions and leadership by women and youth. The initial focus of the activities are in Burkina Faso, Ghana and Senegal.
