= ILEIA =

Independent organisation based in the Netherlands

ILEIA - Centre for learning on sustainable agriculture is an independent organisation based in the Netherlands that supports agro-ecological approaches and family farming.

ILEIA builds knowledge through documentation and systematisation, publishes Farming Matters magazine, and engages in advocacy in order to contribute to farmers' resilience and the improvement of their development options. ILEIA is one of the partners in, and the secretariat of, the AgriCultures Network.
