= FEED Projects =

American fashion company

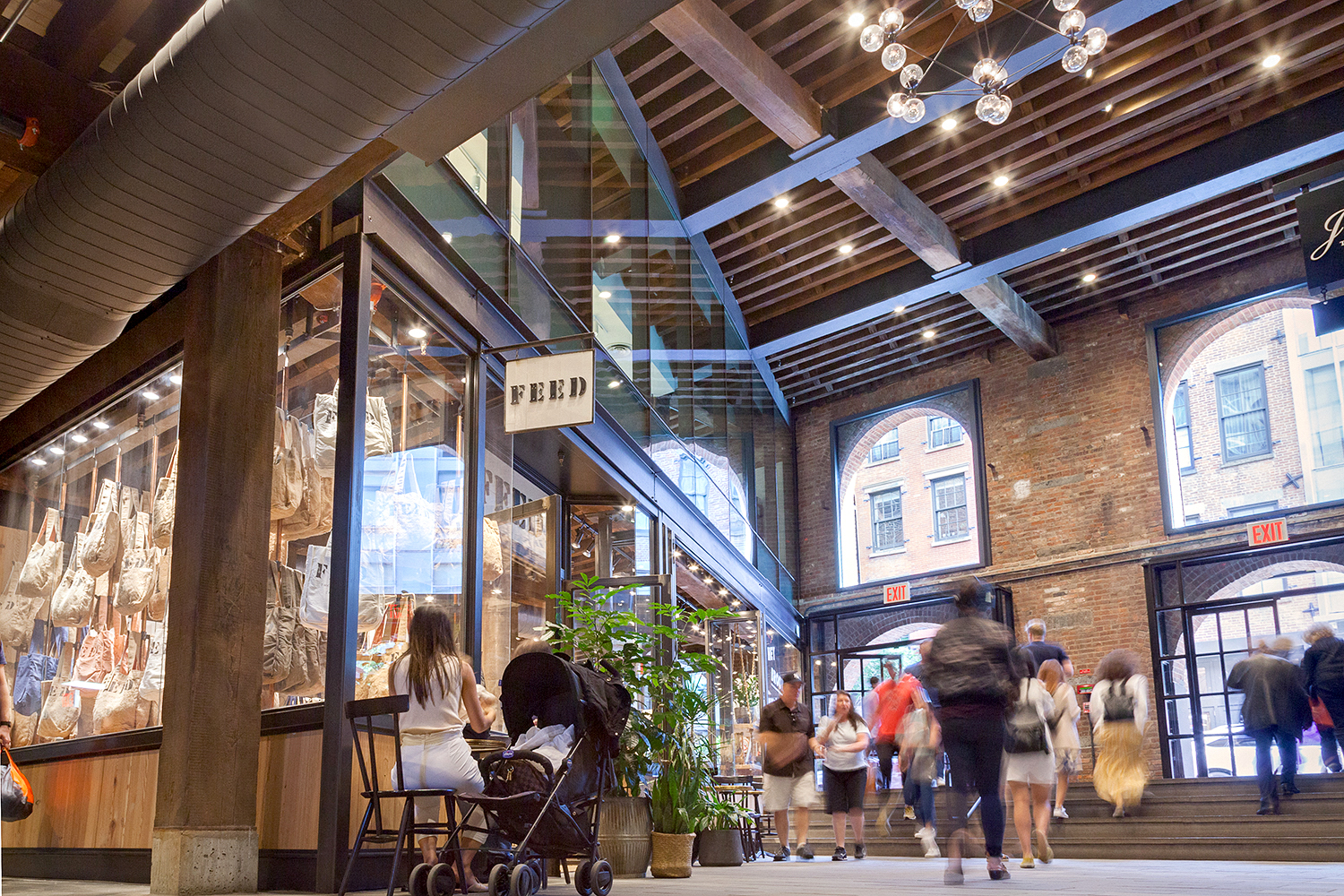
A FEED store in Brooklyn

FEED is an American fashion company, founded by Lauren Bush-Lauren and Ellen Gustafson in 2007.

== History ==
FEED was co-founded by Lauren Bush-Lauren, granddaughter of George H. W. Bush and wife of David Lauren, and Ellen Gustafson in 2007.

Bush-Lauren's initial idea was to create a tangible and shareable way to show consumers their impact. She did so by stamping a number on every product. The number represents the quantity of school meals donated by their purchase. Bush-Lauren was inspired by her travels as a student ambassador with the World Food Programme. By combining fashion and philanthropy she designed her first product the ''FEED 1'' Bag.

In 2012, FEED Projects was listed as a partner of the (RED) campaign, with other brands such as Nike, Girl, American Express and Converse. The campaign's mission is to prevent the transmission of HIV from mothers to their children by 2015 (the campaign's byline is "Fighting For An AIDS Free Generation").

In July 2019, FEED Projects signed a partnership with Ralph Lauren on a capsule collection. In May 2020, FEED Projects signed a partnership with Clarins to sell limited-edition bags filled with products from the cosmetics brand.

== Description ==
FEED is an impact-driven lifestyle brand, the goal of the company is to help feed children in need. FEED has provided more than 110 million meals to date globally through the World Food Programme and domestically through Feeding America along with No Kid Hungry.

Every FEED product has a number on the packaging, indicating the number of school meals that will be provided to a child as a result to the purchase.
