= Pat Roy Mooney =

Canadian scientist

Pat Mooney
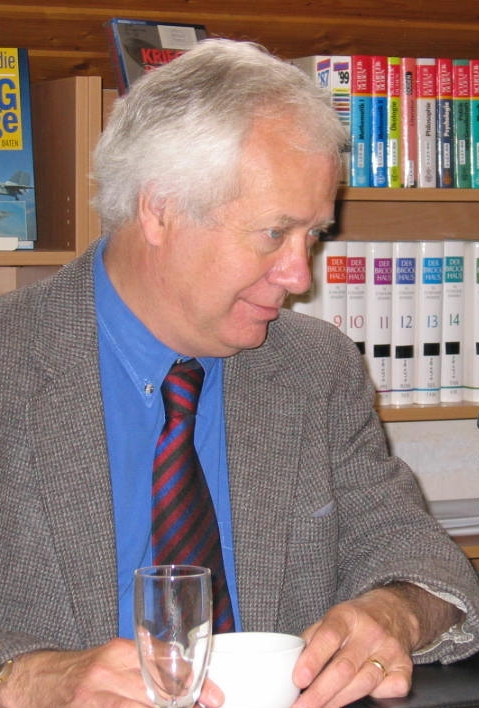
- Born: February 24, 1947 (age 79)
- Awards: Right Livelihood Award; Pearson Medal of Peace; Giraffe Hero
- Scientific career
- Fields: Biodiversity
- Workplaces: Rural Advancement Foundation International, ETC Group

Pat Mooney (born February 24, 1947) has worked with civil society organizations on international trade and development issues related to agriculture, biodiversity and emerging technologies for over 40 years.

== Career ==
Pat Mooney had no formal university training, and in fact did not graduate high school, but, together with Cary Fowler and Hope Shand, he began working on the 'Seeds' issue - the problem that legislation was enabling agribusiness corporations to control access to the seeds to grow the decreasing variety of crops that supported global food supply - in the 1970s. In 1984, the three co-founded RAFI (Rural Advancement Foundation International), whose name was changed to ETC Group (pronounced "etcetera" group) in 2001. ETC Group is a small international CSO addressing the impact of new technologies on vulnerable communities.

Mooney’s more recent work has focused on geoengineering, nanotechnology, synthetic biology and global governance of these technologies as well as corporate involvement in their development. He is a member of the International Panel of Experts on Sustainable Food Systems, and led their Long Food Movement project.

== Awards and recognition ==
- 1985 - Right Livelihood Award (with Cary Fowler) for "working to save the world's genetic plant heritage."
- 1998 - Pearson Medal of Peace
- Giraffe Heroes award for "people who have the courage to stick their necks out for the common good"
- 2017 - Honorary Doctorate of Laws from the University of Waterloo, Canada
- 2017 - Doctor Honoris Causa from 17, Instituto de Estudios Criticos, Mexico.

== Selected works ==
- Mooney, Patrick Roy (1979). Seeds of the Earth: A Private Or Public Resource?. Inter Pares. ISBN 978-0-9690149-0-4. Alt URL
- Fowler, Cary; Mooney, Patrick R. (1990). Shattering: Food, Politics, and the Loss of Genetic Diversity. University of Arizona Press. ISBN 978-0-8165-1181-5.

== Personal life ==
Mooney lived on the Canadian prairies for many years; he now resides just outside the village of Wakefield, Quebec with his second wife in retirement. He has five children and eleven grandchildren.
