= YPARD =

Agricultural Organisation

YPARD - Young Professionals for Agricultural Development
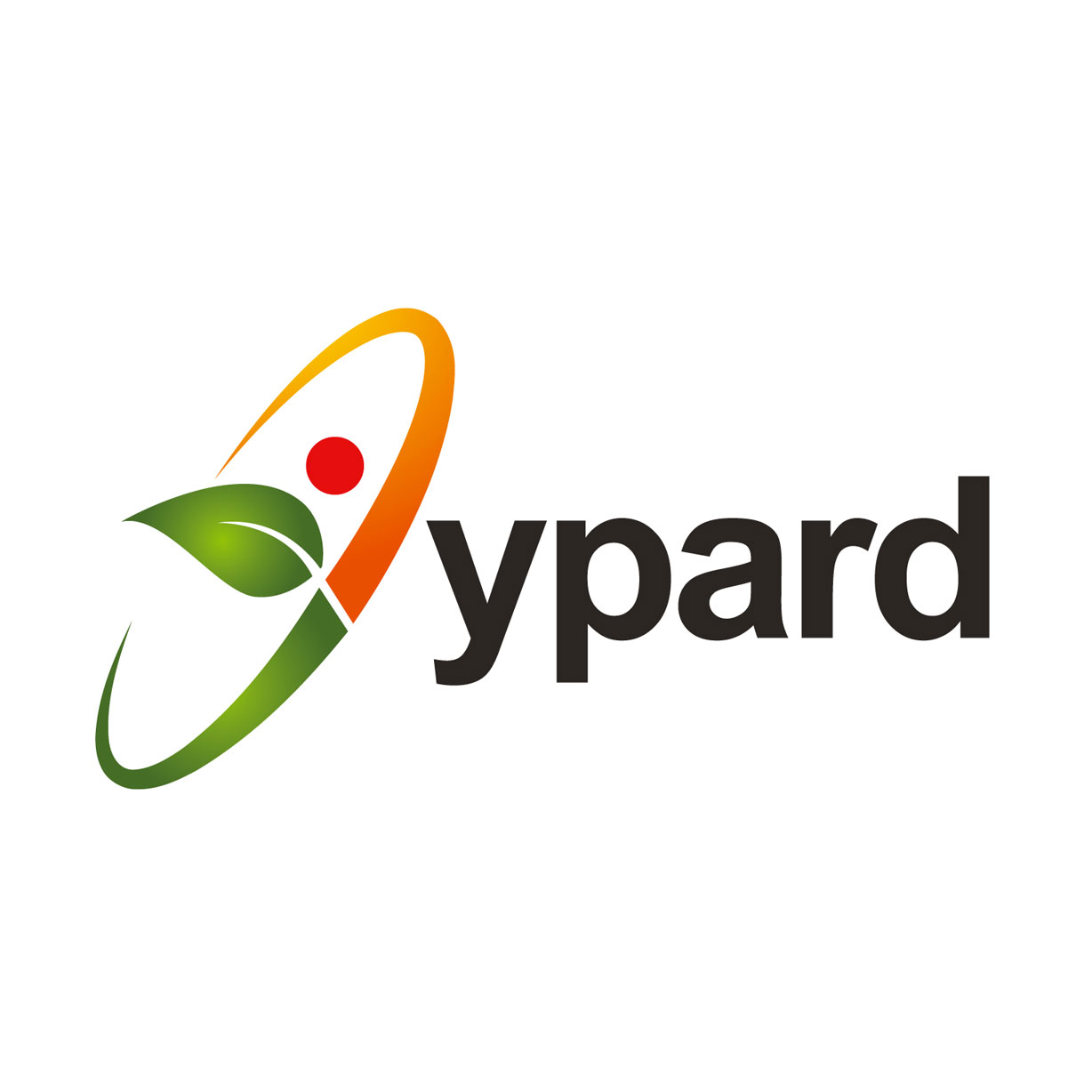
- Formation: 2006
- Type: Non profit organization
- Purpose: Agricultural development
- Headquarters: Berlin
- Location: Germany
- Region served: Worldwide
- Director: Genna Tesdall
- Website: www.ypard.net

Young Professionals for Agricultural Development (YPARD) is an international movement for young professionals. YPARD operates as a network in 72 countries through its chapters. This multi-stakeholder platform's main mission is to serve as a collective global network that enables young professionals to realize their full potential and contribute proactively towards innovative and sustainable agricultural development.

The idea of YPARD was born at an EFARD (European Forum for Agricultural Research for Development) meeting held in Zurich, Switzerland in May 2005 and was formally launched during a side meeting at the GFAR Triennial conference in New Delhi, India, on 8 November 2006.

In 2023 YPARD was registered as a non-profit organization in Berlin, Germany.

== History ==
The FAO (Food and Agriculture Organization) states that in the next 35 years the world's population will increase from 7 billion to over 10 billion. At the same time, agriculture is an ageing and undervalued profession for which there is a declining interest among young people.

Young professionals face numerous challenges including making their voices heard and exerting influence in the field of AR4D. Lack of youth involvement in AR4D has negative implications for the sector, reducing the potential for innovation, use of new communication technologies, inclusivity and future sustainability.

In response to this, in April 2005, at EFARD in Zurich, a small group of young scientists observed that an important policy debate was taking place. This debate had little involvement of young scientists and decides to take action. Two months later in Rome a meeting was held between the group of young professionals and representatives from the Food and Agriculture Organization of the United Nations (FAO), the GFAR, Biodiversity International and the International Fund for Agricultural Development (IFAD).

In December 2005, at the Annual General Meeting (AGM) of the Consultative Group on International Agricultural Research (CGIAR), in Marrakesh, took place a roundtable with the topic: "How to Increase Young People's Involvement in Agricultural Research for Development (ARD)?" That was the seed, hence between March and June 2006, in Bern, gave the input for the meeting with Swiss Agency for Development and Cooperation (SDC) where the initial funding proposal was discussed and signed.

Between May and July 2006 in Wageningen and Leibniz University of Hannover the vision, the mission, the objectives, the governance structure, and the short and long-term activities for the platform were formulated and preparations for the official launch of YPARD began. At the triennial conference of the GFAR, in New Delhi, on 8 November 2006, the Young Professional's Platform for Agricultural Research for Development is officially launched during a side event. A detailed strategic plan for 2018 to 2020 was created in Prague, and the YPARD Charter was revised. YPARD began our new hosting at AGRIDEA and CZU. The Global Policy Working group was launched- this set the stage for key partnerships in the UNFSS Youth Liaison Group and in the Youth Working Group of the CSIPM to the CFS. In 2022 The launch of the YPARD Global Policy Working group culminated in partnership in the Food Systems Pavilion at the UNFCCC COP. We also held the YUFRAS-YPARD Young Rural Advisers Training and Mentorship Program.

Another huge growth step for YPARD in 2023 when we founded YPARD eV, a non-profit registered in Germany. We also started the agroecology GP-SAEP project on Agroecology and the CEA-FIRST project in AU-EU research partnership as a consortium partner. An incubator project was launched in Africa and Asia-Pacific, and a massive youth summit was held in LAC, encouraging youth ideas to grow to the next level. Finally in 2024 We hold an in-person Steering Committee and Staff Retreat in Berlin, revisiting YPARD's vision, mission, values, and strategic way forward. As a board member of the Food and Agriculture for Sustainable Transformation (FAST) Partnership, we strategize with key stakeholders on access to quality climate finance. A brand new website is launched, and we focus on connecting the Rio Conventions with youth efforts.

== Goal and objectives ==
YPARD's goal is to enable and empower young agricultural leaders shaping sustainable food systems.

YPARD seeks to ensure sustainably improved livelihoods worldwide, through these key objectives:

- To ensure long term sustainability of YPARD
- To be a key influencer in the strategic direction of youth engagement in sustainable food systems
- To enable young people in agriculture shape sustainable food systems
- To be an innovative and supportive global team

Two supporting objectives are securing diversified funding sources and ensuring strong management.

All of YPARD's decisions - on global, regional, country and local levels - are made with these objectives in mind. As reflected in the Content Driven Agenda 2014–2018.

Underlying these objectives, YPARD believes that youth in agriculture must be empowered to lead their own development. With an ageing global agricultural system and increasing lack of interest among young people in pursuing agricultural-related careers across the globe, we face a problem of sustainability of the sector. Therefore, "It is necessary to create the next generation of agricultural leaders, thinkers and entrepreneurs who will be able to address these critical development issues", YPARD states.

== Partners ==
YPARD is working in partnership to empower youth in agricultural development. It is supported by the SDC. YPARD has contributed to the generation of the Consultative Group on International Agricultural Research's Program on Dryland Systems youth strategy 2014–2017.

YPARD is hosted by institutions that work in the agricultural field:

- YPARD Global Coordination Unit is hosted by the Czech University of Life Sciences Prague, Prague, Czech Republic;
- YPARD Asia is hosted by CAAS, China;
- YPARD Africa is hosted by FARA, Forum for Agricultural Research in Africa, Ghana;
- YPARD Europe is hosted by Czech University of Life Sciences Prague, Czech Republic

YPARD works in partnership with:

- ACTS - African Centre for Technology Studies, Nairobi, Kenya;
- APAARI - Asia- Pacific Association of Agricultural Research Institutions, Bangkok, Thailand;
- Ardyis Project, Wageningen, Netherlands;
- CGIAR - Consultative Group on International Agricultural Research
- CTA - Technical Center for Agricultural and Rural cooperation ACP – EU, Wageningen, Netherlands;
- e-agriculture, Rome, Italy;
- European Marketing Research Forum EMRC AgriBusiness Forum;
- FARM - The Forum for Agricultural Risk Management in Development;
- Farming First;
- GFRAS - Global Forum for Rural Advisory Services, Lindau, Switzerland;
- GYIN - Global Youth Innovation Network, Washington, D.C., United States;
- ICT-KM;
- IFAD - International Fund for Agricultural Development, Rome, Italy;
- IAAS - International Association of students in Agricultural and related Sciences, Leuven, Belgium;
- LEAD International, London, United Kingdom;
- TVG - Terra Viva Grants
- YPLD - Young Professionals in Local Development, Iași, Romania.

== Membership ==
Conceived as a multi-stakeholder platform, YPARD is a "movement" and does not intend to become a formalized institution. In order to ensure accountability and continuity, as well as enable financial contributions, a small structure is nevertheless established. Participation and contribution to YPARD is on a non-remunerated and voluntary basis with a few exceptions to run the Coordination Units.

YPARD's Charter defines YPARD and the terms of reference of its governance bodies, which are:

- Constituents (the Members: young professionals between 18 and 39 years old and supporting members)
- Steering Committee (SC)
- Regional Coordinators (RC)
- Country representatives (CR)
- Local Representatives (LR)
- Global Coordination Unit (GCU)
- Advisory Group (AG).
