= ETC Group (eco-justice) =

Environmental justice organization

- Action Group on Erosion, Technology and Concentration
- Pronunciation: Et cetera group
- Predecessor: National Sharecroppers Fund
- Formation: 1977; 49 years ago
- Headquarters: 5961 Jeanne-Mance, Montréal, QC H2V 4K9, CANADA
- Board of directors: 10
- Revenue: 710,216 USD (2021)
- Expenses: 618,982 USD (2021)
- Staff: 13
- Website: https://www.etcgroup.org
- Formerly called: Rural Advancement Foundation International

The Action Group on Erosion, Technology, and Concentration (ETC), pronounced "et cetera," is an advocacy organization based around "the conservation and sustainable advancement of cultural and ecological diversity and human rights." ETC frequently publishes opinions on scientific research by its staff and board members, covering topics such as community and regional planning, ecology, evolutionary biology, and political science.

== History ==
The ETC Group, known until September 1, 2001 as the Rural Advancement Foundation International (RAFI), has historical roots linked to the National Sharecroppers Fund which was established in the 1930s. Initiated by Eleanor Roosevelt and other reformers, the Fund aimed to provide support for predominantly black tenant farmers in the United States and advocate for their rights.

In the early 1970s, Pat Mooney, Hope Shand, and Cary Fowler began focusing on seed-related issues under the auspices of the Rural Advancement Foundation. This initiative led to the development of an international branch that prioritized programs to protect farmers' rights and address agricultural challenges in the global south. Over time, the group expanded its scope to include broader issues related to biodiversity and sustainable agriculture.

RAFI was a pioneer in civil society research, critiques, and advocacy related to farmers' rights and seed monopoly laws. The organization opposed the adoption of genetic engineering in agriculture, patents on life, biopiracy (a term coined by RAFI), and emerging life science technologies such as terminator technology, genomic technologies, and nanotechnology. RAFI played a crucial role in advocating for and influencing UN recognition of farmers' rights and the establishment of the International Treaty on Plant Genetic Resources for Food and Agriculture.

In order to secure nonprofit status in the United States, RAFI conducted a name change contest on their website in early 2001, eventually selecting the name ETC Group (etcetera) after considering numerous suggestions from the public.

== Geoengineering ==
The organization has been active against geoengineering, as highlighted through their "Hands off Mother Earth!" campaign, which was launched in April 2010. In October 2010, they published a detailed report titled "Geopiracy: The Case Against Geoengineering," which examined various dimensions of geoengineering. The report covered proposed technologies, governance frameworks, key stakeholders in the geoengineering field, and the involvement and interests of military forces and corporations.

Diana Bronson, a spokesperson for the ETC Group, argued that global warming was largely caused by the actions of the scientific, corporate, and political elites in developed nations. She expressed concerns about entrusting these same entities to resolve the climate crisis and protect the biosphere, highlighting her skepticism regarding their motivations and effectiveness in addressing environmental issues. The organization continues to advocate for sustainable and community-led solutions, warning against quick technological fixes that may have long-term consequences.

== Synthetic biology ==
The ETC Group actively advocates for increased regulation within the emerging scientific domain of synthetic biology, which they characterize as "extreme genetic engineering." The group's primary concerns regarding this field encompasses issues related to corporate involvement as well as potential threats to biosafety and biosecurity. They have sought to raise public awareness and understanding of synthetic biology through the creation and dissemination of comic-style illustrations concerning "Synthia," the cell with the first synthetic genome, engineered by Craig Venter and the J. Craig Venter Institute. Another illustration, titled "The Story of Synthia," was later released as a small video clip.

On December 16, 2010, the Presidential Commission for the Study of Bioethical Issues issued a report recommending self-regulation by synthetic biologists, asserting that the fledgling technology posed minimal risks to society. This recommendation faced strong opposition from Jim Thomas of the ETC Group, who characterized the commission's suggestions as "disappointingly empty and timid." The ETC Group aligned with more than 50 environmental organizations, urging a moratorium on synthetic biology through a letter to government officials. They labeled the commission's conclusions as "irresponsible and dangerous," contending that "self-regulation amounts to no regulation."

On January 23, 2012, UC Berkeley's Richmond Field Station was selected as the site for the Lawrence Berkeley National Lab's secondary campus. In a press conference addressing concerns about synthetic biology at local, national, and international levels, a panel comprising five members, including Jim Thomas of the ETC Group, highlighted the risks associated with synthetic biology. The panel criticized the laboratory's affiliation with UC Berkeley as a superficial endorsement for an inadequately regulated industry with potentially perilous consequences. Additionally, Thomas characterized the industry as a "1.6 billion dollar industry" akin to "genetic engineering on steroids."

== See also ==
- Climate engineering
- Marine cloud brightening
- Mycoplasma laboratorium
- Biological patent
