= Food Tank =

US non-profit organization

- Type: NGO
- Legal status: 501(c)(3)
- Purpose: publication, advocacy
- Headquarters: Baltimore, Maryland
- President: Danielle Nierenberg
- Chairman of the Board: Bernard Pollack
- Treasurer: Nabeeha Mujeeb Kazi-Hutchins
- Board of directors: Regina Anderson, William Burke, Brian Halweil, Julie Kunen, Kerri McClimen, Nabeeha Kazi-Hutchins, Marc Zornes
- Website: foodtank.com

Food Tank: The Think Tank for Food is a global non-profit community working towards positive transformation in how food is produced and consumed. Founded in 2013, it is a research and advocacy organization that educates, advocates, and collaborates with local partners to amplify on-the-ground solutions.

== Food Tank Summits ==
In 2015, Food Tank launched its first Food Tank Summit in Washington, D.C. Since then, Food Tank has been holding a series of summits in various cities focused on sustainability and equity in food systems. Food Tank has hosted summits in Boston, Chicago, New York City, Sacramento, San Francisco, Seattle, and Washington, D.C. The conferences gather experts across all sectors of the food industry including business, government, nonprofit organizations, farmers, unions, and chefs.

== United Nations Climate Change Conference (COP) Programming ==
Food Tank has hosted annual programming at the United Nations Climate Change Conference (COP) since 2021, discussing how food and agriculture offer solutions to the climate crisis. At COP26 in Glasgow, Scotland, Food Tank partnered with Aleph Farms and Nourish Scotland for a discussion around "A New Approach to Meat". Food Tank also partnered with organizations like Compassion in World Farming, ProVeg International, CGIAR, and the Inter-American Institute for Cooperation on Agriculture (IICA) at COP27 in Sharm El Sheikh, Egypt, COP28 in Dubai, the United Arab Emirates, and COP29 in Baku, Azerbaijan. Topics range from sustainable meat to the role of finance in transforming the food system. The events have included a journalists' lunch with the Future Economy Forum.

Food Tank President Danielle Nierenberg has also joined discussions at various Pavilions within the COP Blue Zone, including the panels on food security at the Food Systems Pavilion and the intersection of food waste and climate change at the Penn Pavilion and Nordic Pavilion.

== Climate Week NYC Programming ==
Food Tank hosts and participates in annual programming at Climate Week NYC. The events explore food and agriculture as key solutions to the climate crisis, hosted with organizations like Wholechain, WWF, NYU Steinhardt, the UN Global Compact Ocean Accelerator Network, Envisible LLC, the UN Environment Programme, and ReFED. Events have included a discussion around the film "Food Inc 2" with Marion Nestle, Michael Pollan, and Eric Schlosser, and a summit around climate resilience through agriculture with the American Farmland Trust. In 2025, Food Tank will host a performance of "Little Peasants," an immersive play about a union-organizing effort at a coffeehouse.

== London Climate Action Week Programming ==
Food Tank hosts annual programming at London Climate Action Week with partners like the UN Environment Programme, Unilever, and Google Cloud. In June 2024, Food Tank, Google Cloud, and Nomad Foods hosted “The Intersection of Food, Technology, Investment, and the Climate Crisis" with panelists from the Sustainable Food Trust, Google, the University of Nottingham, the Climate Policy Initiative, and Oatly. In June 2025, Food Tank hosted a Chief Sustainability Officers Summit, "Building the Future of the Food System" with speakers representing TEDWomen and FAIRR.

== SXSW Programming ==
In 2026, Food Tank hosted its 7th Annual “All Things Food” Official SXSW Summit, a day of immersive programming at the Barr Mansion in East Austin featuring the debut of Food Tank’s Short Film Festival, live music, workshops, and “Voices of Female Farmers: A Love Story,” an evening of live storytelling and reception celebrating women shaping the future of farming and food culture.

The free event drew approximately 2,500 rotating attendees throughout the day and covered topics like urban food policy, climate-resilient agriculture, culture, media, and community storytelling. It was held in partnership with Huston-Tillotson University, SXSW, the City of Austin, and Organic Valley. More than 50 speakers and participants included Chef Adrian Lipscomb, executive director of the Muloma Heritage Center; Jason Buechel and Cathy Strange of Whole Foods Market; filmmaker and farmer John Chester of FarmLore Films; Michelle Hughes, executive director of the National Young Farmers Coalition; Elle Gadient, farmer advocate and communications manager for Niman Ranch; Karen Bassarab of the Johns Hopkins Center for a Livable Future; Hayley and Stephanie Painter, the co-founders of Painterland Sisters Yogurt; Paul Greive, farmer and founder of Pasturebird, and more.

== Advocacy ==
Food Tank convened an official listening session in the lead-up to the White House Conference on Hunger, Nutrition and Health in 2022. The session explored the theme "Dismantling Silos to Strengthen Nutrition and Food Security Research" and key takeaways were compiled into a formal report for the White House's consideration as they develop a strategy to end hunger, increase healthy eating and physical activity, and eliminate disparities.

Food Tank joined a coalition of non-governmental organizations and institutions including the Harvard Law School Food Law and Policy Clinic, WeightWatchers International Inc., Grubhub and the Natural Resources Defense Council to help build bipartisan support for the Food Donation Improvement Act, which was signed into law in January 2023. Food Tank's efforts included convening an event on Capitol Hill in partnership with WW, Bread for the World, the Harvard Law School Food Law and Policy Clinic (FLPC), and The Healthy Living Coalition where lawmakers, policy experts, and advocates fighting food waste called on Congress to pass the legislation.

In 2025, Food Tank convened a Capitol Hill luncheon titled “Eating Ourselves Sick? Ultraprocessed Foods and US Health Policy” to discuss bipartisan consensus on removing ultra-processed foods from the U.S. food supply. Speakers included Dariush Mozaffarian, the director of the Food is Medicine Institute; Kyle Diamantas, the deputy commissioner for human foods at the Food and Drug Administration; Jay Bhattacharya, director of the National Institutes of Health; Robert Paarlberg, an adjunct professor of public policy at the Harvard Kennedy School and emeritus professor of political science at Wellesley College; Sen. Roger Marshall, R-Kan.; and Rep. Shri Thanedar, D-Mich.

At the event, cosponsored by the Tufts University Food is Medicine Institute and Food Tank, Rep. Shri Thandehar, D-Mich., said, “Congress needs to act on ultra-processed foods in a bipartisan way.”

== Publications ==
The organization's website is a publishing platform for news about the food industry and system, and it also provides research and analysis with the goal of building a science-based foundation for changing the food system. Topics covered include sustainable agriculture, climate change, food waste, urban agriculture, and policy and organizing.

In 2014, Food Tank partnered with the James Beard Foundation to publish an annual "Good Food Org Guide," a comprehensive directory of nonprofit organizations that are working toward a better food system.

== Podcast ==
In 2018, Food Tank launched an original podcast, Food Talk with Dani Nierenberg, on which Nierenberg invites chefs, experts, and activists to outline their ideal food system and how their projects are making a better food system more attainable.

== Sundance Film Festival ==
Food Tank hosts annual programming at the Sundance Film Festival. In January 2023, Food Tank collaborated with The Lodge at Blue Sky Auberge Resort and Fed by Blue to host a three-day event of screenings, tastings, talks, and live music. The event included a screening of and discussion about "Hope in the Water," a docuseries produced by celebrity chef Andrew Zimmern, Brian Peter Falk, and David E. Kelly about the foods that come from the Earth's bodies of water, including wetlands, streams, and lakes.

On January 20, 2024, Food Tank hosted a day of discussions during the Sundance Film Festival in Park City, Utah, around the relationship between climate change and the food system. Topics included Indigenous foods, food as medicine, the intersections of food and technology, the potential of restaurants in community revitalization, with celebrity speakers including Kimbal Musk and Chef Susan Feniger.

== Arts ==
WeCameToDance is Food Tank's interactive original musical about the climate crisis. It was developed by Creative Producer Bernard Pollack with choreography by House of Jack, original language by David Peterson of Game of Thrones, and original music by Rocky Dawuni. The show debuted a month-long run at 2021 Edinburgh Fringe Festival and is commissioned perform at the U.N. Climate Change Conference (COP26) in Glasgow.

During its initial run, WeCameToDance was featured in the New York Times, The List, Scotsman, The Herald (Scotland), and Edinburgh Reporter and the cast performed live on Good Morning Britain, Al Jazeera, and the BBC.

In 2024, Food Tank debuted Little Peasants, an immersive theatrical showcase by playwright Bernard Pollack and director Dori A. Robinson that spotlights how baristas at a fictional chain called Unicorn Coffee come together to unionize. The audience gains firsthand experience with employer and employee struggles during a unionizing campaign by participating in a meeting with the baristas during the show. At the end, the audience decides if Unicorn Coffee unionizes and the workers and managers must abide by their decision.

A one-act iteration of Little Peasants was previously featured at SXSW in March 2023, where it received critical acclaim and multiple standing ovations.

In 2025, Food Tank launched a farmer storytelling event series at Climate Week NYC. The events invite farmers such as Sea Matias, regenerative farmer at Serra Vida Farm in New York, to tell their stories on stage. Through theatre productions and multimedia projects highlighting farmer stories and indigenous growers and producers, voices often marginalized in mainstream dialogues can provoke new lines of thinking among an audience with the potential to really affect change. The Curt Bergfors Food Planet Prize writes, "Through theatre productions and multimedia projects highlighting farmer stories and indigenous growers and producers, voices often marginalized in mainstream dialogues can provoke new lines of thinking among an audience with the potential to really affect change."

The concept has expanded internationally: As part of the 2026 Scene And Heard festival in Dublin, Ireland, Food Tank premiered Voices of Irish Farmers: A Love Story. Adapted and facilitated by Lucy Holmes, an Irish actor and writer, the event brought "farming, the storytelling tradition and our food sources to the fore through the stories of three women who work in the farming industry." The series is also produced as a documentary, Voices of Irish Farmers, featuring Irish Farmers Sophie Bell, Carina Roseingrave, and Ailbhe Gerrard.

In February 2026, Voice of Australian Farmers: A Love Story premiered opening night of the Adelaide Fringe Show with regenerative farmers from across Australia, including opera singer Hannah Greenshields.
