= Karelsulcia muelleri =

"Candidatus Karelsulcia muelleri"

Scientific classification (Candidatus)
- Domain: Bacteria
- Phylum: Bacteroidota
- Class: Flavobacteriia
- Order: Flavobacteriales
- Family: Blattabacteriaceae
- Genus: "Candidatus Karelsulcia" corrig. Moran et al. 2005 in Oren 2017

Binomial name
- "Candidatus Karelsulcia muelleri" corrig. Moran et al. 2005

Synonyms
- "Ca. Sulcia muelleri" Moran et al. 2005, nom. illeg.

Species of bacterium

Candidatus Karelsulcia muelleri is an aerobic, gram-negative, bacillus bacterium that is a part of the phylum Bacteroidota. Ca. K. muelleri is an obligate and mutualistic symbiotic microbe commonly found occupying specialized cell compartments of sap-feeding insects called bacteriocytes. A majority of the research done on Ca. K. muelleri has detailed its relationship with the host Homalodisca vitripennis. Other studies have documented the nature of its residency in other insects like the maize leafhopper (Cicadulina) or the spittlebug (Cercopoidea). Ca. K. muelleri is noted for its exceptionally minimal genome and it is currently identified as having the smallest known sequenced Bacteroidota genome at only 245 kilobases.

Various "Ca. Karesulcia" strains have an intimate relationship with plant sap-feeding auchenorrhynchan insects of the order Hemiptera, with the initial symbiotic event dating back to 340 million years ago, providing 8 essential amino acids to the host. The "Ca. Karesulcia" symbioant genome is highly conserved among insects and has co-evolved with the host ever since the initial event.

== History and Etymology ==
Ca. K. muelleri was classified under microscope in 2005 by the evolutionary biologist Nancy A. Moran. The endosymbiont was found in the dissected bacteriocyte of the spittlebug (Calstopter arizonana).

The genus "Candidatus Sulcia" is named after Karel Šulc, a Moravian embryologist who was one of the first scientists to recognize that the insect bacteriome is an organ where bacteria reside. The name was amended to "Ca. Karelsulcia" in 2017 to avoid breach of the nomenclatural code, as Sulcia is already a genus of spiders.

The species, muelleri, has been named in the honor of H. J. Müller, (not to be confused with Hermann Joseph Muller) who speculated in 1960 that there was a parallel evolutionary history between endosymbionts and a select clade of insect hosts known as Auchenorrhyncha.

== Morphology ==
Little has been documented about the morphology of Ca. K. muelleri.

Ca. K. muelleri is a rod-shaped bacterium measuring 5–7 μm in length, 0.7 μm in diameter and 2–5 μm in width. Because Ca. K. muelleri lacks most of the genes responsible for cell division and membrane synthesis, it is sometimes observed to extend to unusual lengths of up to 100 μm during part of its life cycle.

Like all other Flavobacteriales, Ca. K. muelleri is gram-negative.

== Phylogeny ==
The phylogeny of Ca. K. muelleri has been discovered to follow the phylogeny of the Hemiptera clade, Auchenorrhyncha.

As of February 2026, the NCBI Genome page lists 195 genomes of "Ca. Karelsulcia".

Phylogeny using 120 bacterial markers from known genomes (see GTDB) places the bacterium under family Blattabacteriaceae. Using 67 full genomes of acceptable quality, the database is able to define 7 species-level groups.

=== "Candidatus Karelsulcia" and the Flavobacteria ===
The tree below demonstrates the position of Ca. K. muelleri with respect to some other members of the class Flavobacteriia. The tree was constructed by comparing the peptide sequences of ten different types of proteins. The proteins used were the DNA polymerase III beta-subunit, initiation factor IF-2, leucyl-tRNA synthetase, the phenylalanine—tRNA ligase beta-subunit, VARS, elongation factor Tu, the RNA polymerase beta-subunit, and the ribosomal proteins L2, S5, and S11. Where Ca. K. muelleri is found occupying the body of Auchenorrhyncha hosts, the other members of Flavobacteriia are found residing in freshwater bodies and soils. The inference for the long, isolated stretch of the Ca. K. muelleri branch is that there has been a high frequency of base-pair substitution which has led to noticeable genetic differences between Ca. K. muelleri and most other Flavobacteriia.

- - - - - - - - - - - - - - Croceibacter
                          - Gramella
                        - - Cellulophaga
                      - - - - Robiginitalea
                    - Flavobacterium
                  - - Polaribacter
                - - - - - - - - - - - "Candidatus Karelsulcia"
              - - - - Bacteroides
                  - - Prevotella
            - - - - Algoriphagus
                - - - Microscilla
                  - - Cytophaga
  - - - outgroup
        - - Salinibacter

== Genomics ==
The Ca. K. muelleri, strain GWSS genome was completely sequenced at McDonnell Genome Institute using Illumina dye sequencing. The genome is an exceptionally reduced genome, where the genetic range of Ca. K. muelleri is only 10% of that of Escherichia coli's. It is composed of one circular chromosome that measures 245,530 base pairs long. There are neither any plasmids nor any other mobile genetic elements. The genome contains a total of 263 genes: 227 protein genes, 36 RNA genes and one pseudogene. Of the 227 different polypeptides, 99 of them are enzymes and another 9 are transport proteins. The GC-content is 22.4%.

A distinct feature of the Ca. K. muelleri genome is the presence of three unique rRNA sequences at the positions of (486-504), (1001-1016), (1418-1431). The implications of these unique sequences are not identified.

It has lost most regulatory genes due to its dependence on the host environment.

=== Reduced genome ===
The Ca. K. muelleri genome is what scientists refer to as a reduced genome; it is categorized by the apparent evolutionary loss of many ostensibly essential genes related to processes like DNA repair, translation or cell membrane biosynthesis. The conditions required for genome reduction can be multifaceted, however they often involve some form of stability. The occurrence of genome reduction raises interesting questions about what the minimal requirements for a functioning genome are. Scientists are currently testing their hypotheses about the matter by engineering their own reduced genomes.

== Symbiosis ==
Ca. K. muelleri is an obligate endosymbiont of sap-feeding insects, primarily cicadas and leafhoppers, where it provides essential amino acids missing from their plant sap diet. Almost all insects that associate with "Ca. Karesulcia" carry a second symbioant to provide additional essential nutrients to the host. In most cases the second symbioant is of class Betaproteobacteria (Zinderia, Nasuia, Vidania), but Alpha- ("Ca. Hodgkinia") and Gammaproteobacteria (Baumannia) are also seen. In one extreme case, a fungus Ophiocordyceps has replaced a degraded "Ca. Hodgkinia" symbioant in some cicada species. It is unclear whether the betaproteobacterial symbioants were ancestral or later independently acquired.

Insect-associated symbionts have been found to share a similar set of features. All symbionts appear to possess a reduced genome, have a high GC-content and bear a more frequent base-pair substitution rate compared to their free-living ancestors.

Because of symbiosis, hosts may be able to utilize metabolic pathways they might not be able to use if their endosymbionts were absent; one relevant example is the ability for sap-feeding insects to survive off of relatively nutrient-poor food sources, e.g. xylem and phloem.

=== Glassy-winged sharpshooter ===
Most of the contemporary research concerning the nature of the symbiosis between Ca. K. muelleri and its hosts has been conducted on the glassy-winged sharpshooter (Homalodisca vitripennis). Ca. K. muelleri is always found inside the bacteriocyte of a host along with at least one other endosymbiont; The GSWW strain of Ca. K. muelleri is found within the glassy-winged sharpshooter along with the Gammaproteobacterium, Baumannia cicadellinicola. Genomic analysis has revealed the respective metabolic roles for each other members of this symbiotic triangle. The glassy-winged sharpshooter, which feeds on the xylem of plants, supplies simple amino acids and carbon sources for the two endosymbionts. In return, Ca. K. muelleri uses the basic materials to synthesize complex amino acids like homoserine or L-threonine. Baumannia cicadellinicola is reported to provide most of the cofactors and vitamins for the system.

One unanswered question about this symbiotic relationship asks how the endosymbionts receive a sufficient amount of nitrogen. This speculation arises due to the dilute and nutrient-poor character of xylem. Although nitrogen assimilation was hypothesized, genomic analysis suggests that Ca. K. muelleri lacks the ability to perform this function.

Listed below is a model of the symbiotic metabolic exchange based on the metabolites that are used by Ca. K. muelleri and the metabolites that are produced by Ca. K. muelleri. The glassy-winged sharpshooter is mostly responsible for providing Ca. K. muelleri with nutrients and basic amino acids received from the xylem it feeds on. Ca. K. muelleri, in return, produces more complex substrates.

Metabolic exchange in the Homalodisca vitripennis symbiosis
Produced by Ca. K. muelleri	Received from Homalodisca vitripennis	Received from Baumannia cicadellinicola
2-ketovaline	cysteine	Erythrose 4-phosphate
L-threonine	L-serine	Phosphoenolpyruvic acid
homoserine	L-aspartate	Ribose 5-phosphate
L-Lysine	Erythrose 4-phosphate	octaprenyl-diphosphate
LL-2,6-diaminoheptanedioate	Ribose 5-phosphate	Oxaloacetic acid

=== Cicadas ===
Cicadas have a multipartite symbiostic system including vertically-transmitted "Ca. Karelsulcia", "Ca. Hodgkinia", and Arsenophonus. The metabolic roles within this symbiosis are divided: Ca. Karelsulcia produces phenylalanine and tryptophan via chorismate from PEP, arginine via ornithine from glutamate, valine and leucine via 2-ketovaline from pyruvate, and lysine, threonine, isoleucine, and L,L-cystathionine from aspartate. Meanwhile, Ca. Hodgkinia produces methionine from L,L-cystathionine and histidine from PRPP, while Arsenophonus provides four B vitamins: biotin, folate, pyridoxine, and riboflavin.

In some individuals of Chremistica ochracea, the degraded "Ca. Hodgkinia" lives inside the "Ca. Karelsulcia" cells while Ophiocordyceps takes its role as the second endosymbioant partner.

=== Planthoppers ===
Most planthoppers harbor both "Ca. Karelsulcia" and Vidania. Their "Ca. Karelsulcia" genomes are more reduced compared to the GWSS strain, many being no more than 150 kilobases long. Some planthoppers have "Ca. Karelsulcia" with fragmented genomes and others have even lost it completely. Every sampled planthopper species that has lost its "Ca. Karelsulcia" has acquired new symbioants, usually an alphaproteobacterium, a gammaprotobacterium, and/or a Hypocreales fungus.

==== Dictyopharidae ====
The Dictyopharidae planthoppers harbor a microbiome consisting of the ancestral primary symbioants "Ca. Karelsulcia" and Vidania as well as an independently acquired co-primary symbionts, either Arsenophonus or Sodalis.

== Biology and metabolism ==
Ca. K. muelleri is found in the bacteriocytes of their insect hosts. The only time when the bacterial cells are not found in the bacteriocyte compartments is when they are transferred vertically from the host to their host's offspring.

Evidence suggests that Ca. K. muelleri utilizes aerobic respiration. ATP is synthesized by way of a cytochrome c oxidase catalyzed termination, specifically using a cbb-3 type cytochrome. The electron donor for the bacterium is implied to be carbon sources retrieved from the host's sap-feeding diet, such as glutamate, malate, and glucose, all of which are present in xylem sap. The symbiont also harvests reducing power in the form of NADH.

The analysis of Ca. K. muelleri, strain GWSS's reduced genome suggests that a proportionate amount of the genes preserved over its evolution are dedicated to amino acid biosynthesis. 21.3% of its protein-coding genes are dedicated to creating amino acids, while another 33% is dedicated to translation-related processes. Ca. K. muelleri is usually capable of synthesizing 8 of its essential amino acids: leucine, valine, threonine, isoleucine, lysine, arginine, phenylalanine, and tryptophan. Some strains of Ca. K. muelleri are incapable of making the amino acid, tryptophan. It receives its other two amino acids – methionine and histidine from either its host or its co-symbiont. Sulcia muelleri is responsible for making two complex amino acids for its host: homoserine and 2-ketovaline. Ca. K. muelleri lacks a full set of Aminoacyl tRNA synthetases; surprisingly, however, it possesses all of the genes necessary to code for all 20 amino acids.

Other proteins that Ca. K. muelleri makes include a couple of transport proteins; the microbe creates organic cation transport proteins, antibiotic-related transporters and heavy-metal ion transporters.

Ca. K. muelleri is marked down for containing only two genes dedicated to cofactor or vitamin production; these genes code for the synthesis of menaquinone. Ca. K. muelleri receives most of its cofactors or vitamins from its cosymbiont.

Ca. K. muelleri has a minimal set of genes assigned for DNA housekeeping purposes. The only genes it has for DNA repair are the mutL and mutS genes.
