= Essential gene =

Gene thought to be critical for an organism's survival

Essential genes are indispensable genes for organisms to grow and reproduce offspring under certain environment. However, being essential is highly dependent on the circumstances in which an organism lives. For instance, a gene required to digest starch is only essential if starch is the only source of energy. Recently, systematic attempts have been made to identify those genes that are absolutely required to maintain life, provided that all nutrients are available. Such experiments have led to the conclusion that the absolutely required number of genes for bacteria is on the order of about 250–300. Essential genes of single-celled organisms encode proteins for three basic functions including genetic information processing, cell envelopes and energy production. Those gene functions are used to maintain a central metabolism, replicate DNA, translate genes into proteins, maintain a basic cellular structure, and mediate transport processes into and out of the cell. Compared with single-celled organisms, multicellular organisms have more essential genes related to communication and development. Most of the essential genes in viruses are related to the processing and maintenance of genetic information. In contrast to most single-celled organisms, viruses lack many essential genes for metabolism, which forces them to hijack the host's metabolism. Most genes are not essential but convey selective advantages and increased fitness. Genome minimization studies have also revealed a limited number of genes that though not essential, they are rarely eliminated when constructing minimal metabolic networks, suggesting that it is difficult for metabolism to be re-routed. Hence, the vast majority of genes are not essential and many can be deleted without consequences, at least under most circumstances.

== Bacteria: genome-wide studies ==
Two main strategies have been employed to identify essential genes on a genome-wide basis: directed deletion of genes and random mutagenesis using transposons. In the first case, annotated individual genes (or ORFs) are completely deleted from the genome in a systematic way. In transposon-mediated mutagenesis, transposons are randomly inserted in as many positions in a genome as possible, aiming to disrupt the function of the targeted genes (see figure below). Insertion mutants that are still able to survive or grow suggest the transposon inserted in a gene that is not essential for survival. The location of the transposon insertions can be determined through hybridization to microarrays or through transposon sequencing . With the development of CRISPR, gene essentiality has also been determined through inhibition of gene expression through CRISPR interference. A summary of such screens is shown in the table.

Organism	Mutagenesis	Method	Readout	ORFs	Non-ess.	Essential	% Ess.	Notes	Ref.
Mycoplasma genitalium/pneumoniae	Random	Population	Sequencing	482	130	265–350	55–73%	---	
Mycoplasma genitalium	Random	Clones	Sequencing	482	100	382	79%	b,c	
Staphylococcus aureus WCUH29	Random	Clones	Sequencing	2,600	n/a	168	n/a	b,c	
Staphylococcus aureus RN4220	Random	Clones	Sequencing	2,892	n/a	658	23%	---	
Haemophilus influenzae Rd	Random	Population	Footprint-PCR	1,657	602	670	40%	---	
Streptococcus pneumoniae Rx-1	Targeted	Clones	Colony formation	2,043	234	113	n/a	c	
Streptococcus pneumoniae D39	Targeted	Clones	Colony formation	2,043	560	133	n/a	c	
Streptococcus pyogenes 5448	Random	Transposon	Tn-seq	1,865	?	227	12%	---	
Streptococcus pyogenes NZ131	Random	Transposon	Tn-seq	1,700	?	241	14%	---	
Streptococcus sanguinis SK36	Targeted	Clones	Colony formation	2,270	2,052	218	10%	a,j	
Mycobacterium tuberculosis H37Rv	Random	Population	Microarray	3,989	2,567	614	15%	---	
Mycobacterium tuberculosis	Random	Transposon	?	3,989	?	401	10%	---	
Mycobacterium tuberculosis H37Rv	Random	Transposon	NG-Sequencing	3,989	?	774	19%	---	
Mycobacterium tuberculosis H37Rv	Random	Transposon	NG-Sequencing	3,989	3,364	625	16%	h,i	
Mycobacterium tuberculosis	---	Computational	Computational	3,989	?	283	7%	---	
Mycobacterium tuberculosis H37Rv	Targeted	CRISPRi	NG-Sequencing	4,052	33,15	737	18%	---	
Bacillus subtilis 168	Targeted	Clones	Colony formation	4,105	3,830	261	7%	a,d,g	
Escherichia coli K-12 MG1655	Random	Population	Footprint-PCR	4,308	3,126	620	14%	---	
Escherichia coli K-12 MG1655	Targeted	Clones	Colony formation	4,308	2,001	n/a	n/a	a,e	
Escherichia coli K-12 BW25113	Targeted	Clones	Colony formation	4,390	3,985	303	7%	a	
Pseudomonas aeruginosa PAO1	Random	Clones	Sequencing	5,570	4,783	678	12%	a	
Porphyromonas gingivalis	Random	Transposon	Sequencing	1,990	1,527	463	23%	---	
Pseudomonas aeruginosa PA14	Random	Clones	Sequencing	5,688	4,469	335	6%	a,f	
Salmonella typhimurium	Random	Clones	Sequencing	4,425	n/a	257	~11%	b,c	
Helicobacter pylori G27	Random	Population	Microarray	1,576	1,178	344	22%	---	
Corynebacterium glutamicum	Random	Population	?	3,002	2,352	650	22%	---	
Francisella novicida	Random	Transposon	?	1,719	1,327	392	23%	---	
Mycoplasma pulmonis UAB CTIP	Random	Transposon	?	782	472	310	40%	---	
Vibrio cholerae N16961	Random	Transposon	?	3,890	?	779	20%	---	
Salmonella Typhi	Random	Transposon	?	4,646	?	353	8%	---	
Staphylococcus aureus	Random	Transposon	?	~2,600	?	351	14%	---	
Caulobacter crescentus	Random	Transposon	Tn-Seq	3,876	3,240	480	12.2%	---	
Neisseria meningitidis	Random	Transposon	?	2,158	?	585	27%	---	
Desulfovibrio alaskensis	Random	Transposon	Sequencing	3,258	2,871	387	12%	---	

Table 1. Essential genes in bacteria. Mutagenesis: targeted mutants are gene deletions; random mutants are transposon insertions. Methods: Clones indicate single gene deletions, population indicates whole population mutagenesis, e.g. using transposons. Essential genes from population screens include genes essential for fitness (see text). ORFs: number of all open reading frames in that genome. Notes: (a) mutant collection available; (b) direct essentiality screening method (e.g. via antisense RNA) that does not provide information about nonessential genes. (c) Only partial dataset available. (d) Includes predicted gene essentiality and data compilation from published single-gene essentiality studies. (e) Project in progress. (f) Deduced by comparison of the two gene essentiality datasets obtained independently in the P. aeruginosa strains PA14 and PAO1. (g) The original result of 271 essential genes has been corrected to 261, with 31 genes that were thought to be essential being in fact non-essential whereas 20 novel essential genes have been described since then. (h) Counting genes with essential domains and those that lead to growth-defects when disrupted as essential, and those who lead to growth-advantage when disrupted as non-essential. (i) Involved a fully saturated mutant library of 14 replicates, with 84.3% of possible insertion sites with at least one transposon insertion. (j) Each essential gene has been independently confirmed at least five times.

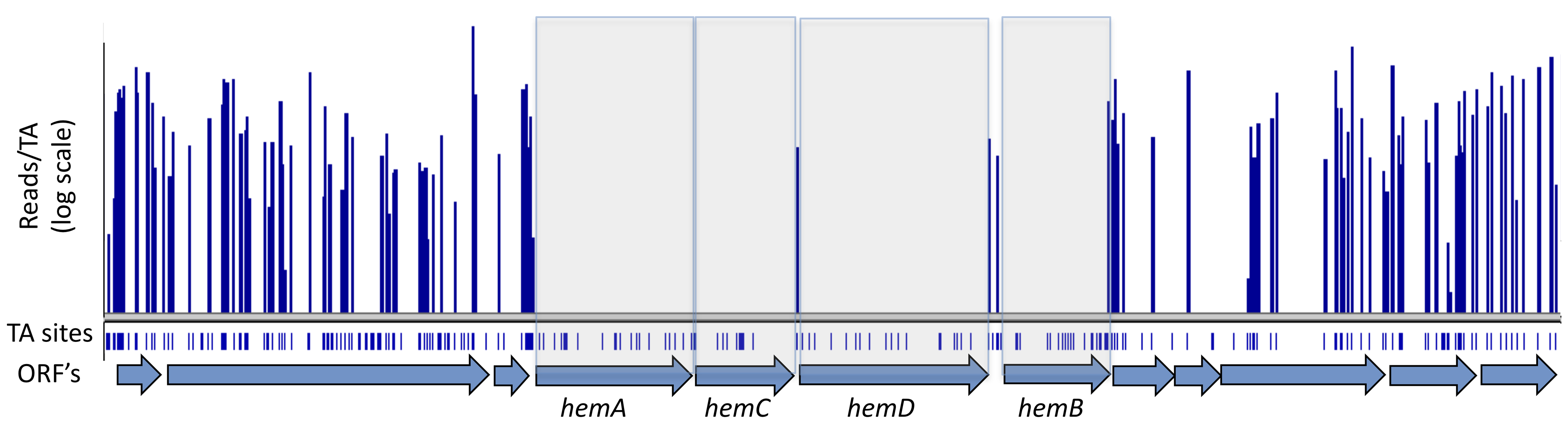
Essential genes in Mycobacterium tuberculosis H37Rv as found by using transposons which insert in random positions in the genome. If no transposons are found in a gene, the gene is most likely essential as it cannot tolerate any insertion. In this example, essential heme biosynthetic genes hemA, hemB, hemC, hemD are devoid of insertions. The number of sequence reads (reads/TA) is shown for the indicated region of the H37Rv chromosome. Potential TA dinucleotide insertions sites are indicated. Image from Griffin et al. 2011.

On the basis of genome-wide experimental studies and systems biology analysis, an essential gene database has been developed by Kong et al. (2019) for predicting > 4000 bacterial species.

== Eukaryotes ==
=== Yeast ===
In Saccharomyces cerevisiae (budding yeast) 15-20% of all genes are essential. In Schizosaccharomyces pombe (fission yeast) 4,836 heterozygous deletions covering 98.4% of the 4,914 protein coding open reading frames have been constructed. 1,260 of these deletions turned out to be essential. Genome minimization studies have also revealed a limited set of metabolic genes that though not essential, they are difficult to remove without significantly affecting the efficiency of the global metabolism. These genes have more genetic and protein-protein interactions, are single copy and more conserved than the average metabolic gene.

=== Animals ===
Similar screens are more difficult to carry out in other multicellular organisms, including mammals (as a model for humans), due to technical reasons, and their results are less clear. However, various methods have been developed for the nematode worm C. elegans, the fruit fly, and zebrafish (see table). A recent study of 900 mouse genes concluded that 42% of them were essential although the selected genes were not representative.

=== Humans ===
Gene knockout experiments are not possible or at least not ethical in humans. However, natural mutations have led to the identification of mutations that lead to early embryonic or later death. Note that many genes in humans are not absolutely essential for survival but can cause severe disease when mutated. Such mutations are catalogued in the Online Mendelian Inheritance in Man (OMIM) database. In a computational analysis of genetic variation and mutations in 2,472 human orthologs of known essential genes in the mouse, Georgi et al. found strong, purifying selection and comparatively reduced levels of sequence variation, indicating that these human genes are essential too.

While it may be difficult to prove that a gene is essential in humans, it can be demonstrated that a gene is not essential or not even causing disease. For instance, sequencing the genomes of 2,636 Icelandic citizens and the genotyping of 101,584 additional subjects found 8,041 individuals who had 1 gene completely knocked out (i.e. these people were homozygous for a non-functional gene). Of the 8,041 individuals with complete knock-outs, 6,885 were estimated to be homozygotes, 1,249 were estimated to be compound heterozygotes (i.e. they had both alleles of a gene knocked out but the two alleles had different mutations). In these individuals, a total of 1,171 of the 19,135 human (RefSeq) genes (6.1%) were completely knocked out. It was concluded that these 1,171 genes are non-essential in humans — at least no associated diseases were reported. Similarly, the exome sequences of 3222 British Pakistani-heritage adults with high parental relatedness revealed 1111 rare-variant homozygous genotypes with predicted loss of gene function (LOF = knockouts) in 781 genes. This study found an average of 140 predicted LOF genotypes (per subject), including 16 rare (minor allele frequency <1%) heterozygotes, 0.34 rare homozygotes, 83.2 common heterozygotes and 40.6 common homozygotes. Nearly all rare homozygous LOF (homLoF) genotypes were found within autozygous segments (94.9%). Even though most of these individuals had no obvious health issue arising from their defective genes, it is possible that minor health issues may be found upon more detailed examination. A recent study sequenced the genomes of people living in Pakistan, due to their high levels of family relatedness (that is, relatives frequently marry each other). They found naturally occurring homLoF variants in 6,476 genes, that is, these genes were clearly not essential for survival. Of these, 3,323 genes (51%) were unique homLoF mutants compared to 761,616 non-South Asian individuals in the Genome Aggregation Database (gnomAD). The combined set of homLOF variants included 7,954 genes, suggesting that about 8,000 humans are not essential for survival.

A summary of essentiality screens is shown in the table below (mostly based on the Database of Essential Genes.

Organism	Method	Essential genes	Ref.
Arabidopsis thaliana	T-DNA insertion	777	
Caenorhabditis elegans (worm)	RNA interference	294	
Danio rerio (zebrafish)	Insertion mutagenesis	288	
Drosophila melanogaster (fruit fly)	P-element insertion mutagenesis	339	
Homo sapiens (human)	Literature search	118	
Homo sapiens (human)	CRISPR/Cas9-based screen	1,878	
Homo sapiens (human)	Haploid gene-trap screen	~2,000	
Homo sapiens (human)	mouse orthologs	2,472	
Mus musculus (mouse)	Literature search	2114	
Saccharomyces cerevisiae (yeast)	Single-gene deletions	878	
Saccharomyces cerevisiae (yeast)	Single-gene deletions	1,105	
Schizosaccharomyces pombe (yeast)	Single-gene deletions	1,260	

== Viruses ==
Viruses lack many genes necessary for metabolism, forcing them to hijack the host's metabolism. Screens for essential genes have been carried out in a few viruses. For instance, human cytomegalovirus (CMV) was found to have 41 essential, 88 nonessential, and 27 augmenting ORFs (150 total ORFs). Most essential and augmenting genes are located in the central region, and nonessential genes generally cluster near the ends of the viral genome.

Tscharke and Dobson (2015) compiled a comprehensive survey of essential genes in Vaccinia Virus and assigned roles to each of the 223 ORFs of the Western Reserve (WR) strain and 207 ORFs of the Copenhagen strain, assessing their role in replication in cell culture. According to their definition, a gene is considered essential (i.e. has a role in cell culture) if its deletion results in a decrease in virus titre of greater than 10-fold in either a single or multiple step growth curve. All genes involved in wrapped virion production, actin tail formation, and extracellular virion release were also considered as essential. Genes that influence plaque size, but not replication were defined as non-essential. By this definition 93 genes are required for Vaccinia Virus replication in cell culture, while 108 and 94 ORFs, from WR and Copenhagen respectively, are non-essential. Vaccinia viruses with deletions at either end of the genome behaved as expected, exhibiting only mild or host range defects. In contrast, combining deletions at both ends of the genome for VACV strain WR caused a devastating growth defect on all cell lines tested. This demonstrates that single gene deletions are not sufficient to assess the essentiality of genes and that more genes are essential in Vaccinia virus than originally thought.

One of the bacteriophages screened for essential genes includes mycobacteriophage Giles. At least 35 of the 78 predicted Giles genes (45%) are non-essential for lytic growth. 20 genes were found to be essential. A major problem with phage genes is that a majority of their genes remain functionally unknown, hence their role is difficult to assess. A screen of Salmonella enterica phage SPN3US revealed 13 essential genes although it remains a bit obscure how many genes were really tested.

A sequencing-based technique, Phage-TnSeq, has ben applied to a Pseudomonas aeruginosa-infecting phage (ΦKZ, 280,334 bp) and shown that of the 371 predicted genes 110 genes are "fitness-conferring", identifying unknown essential genes as well as ∼261 non-essential genes.

== Quantitative gene essentiality analysis ==
In theory, essential genes are qualitative. However, depending on the surrounding environment, certain essential gene mutants may show partial functions, which can be quantitatively determined in some studies. For instance, a particular gene deletion may reduce growth rate (or fertility rate or other characters) to 90% of the wild-type. If there are isozymes or alternative pathways for the essential genes, they can be deleted completely. Using CRISPR interference, the expression of essential genes can be modulated or "tuned", leading to quantitative (or continuous) relationships between the level of gene-expression and the magnitude of fitness cost exhibited by a given mutant.

== Synthetic lethality ==
Two genes are synthetic lethal if neither one is essential but when both are mutated the double-mutant is lethal. Some studies have estimated that the number of synthetic lethal genes may be on the order of 45% of all genes.

== Conditionally essential genes ==
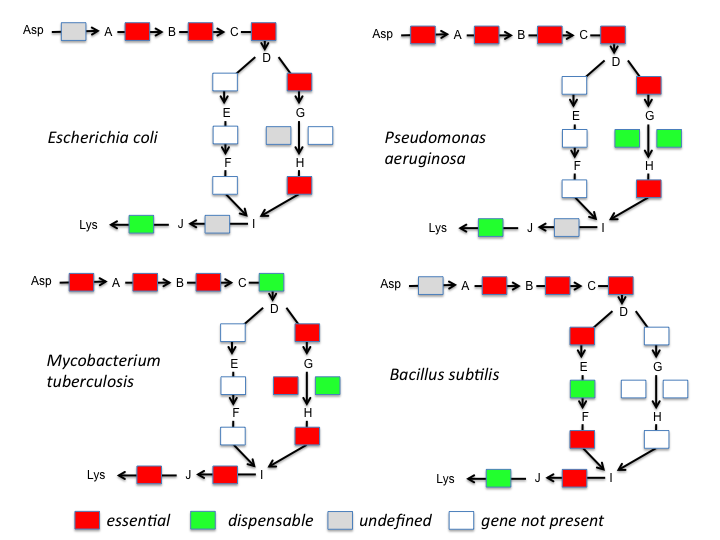
A schematic view of essential genes (or proteins) in lysine biosynthesis of different bacteria. The same protein may be essential in one species but not another.

Many genes are essential only under certain circumstances. For instance, if the amino acid lysine is supplied to a cell any gene that is required to make lysine is non-essential. However, when there is no lysine supplied, genes encoding enzymes for lysine biosynthesis become essential, as no protein synthesis is possible without lysine.

Streptococcus pneumoniae appears to require 147 genes for growth and survival in saliva, more than the 113-133 that have been found in previous studies.

The deletion of a gene may result in death or in a block of cell division. While the latter case may implicate "survival" for some time, without cell division the cell may still die eventually. Similarly, instead of blocked cell division a cell may have reduced growth or metabolism ranging from nearly undetectable to almost normal. Thus, there is gradient from "essential" to completely non-essential, again depending on the condition. Some authors have thus distinguished between genes "essential for survival" and "essential for fitness".

The role of genetic background. Similar to environmental conditions, the genetic background can determine the essentiality of a gene: a gene may be essential in one individual but not another, given his or her genetic background. Gene duplications are one possible explanation (see below).

Metabolic dependency. Genes involved in certain biosynthetic pathways, such as amino acid synthesis, can become non-essential if one or more amino acids are supplied by culture medium or by another organism. This is the main reason why many parasites (e.g. Cryptosporidium hominis) or endosymbiontic bacteria lost many genes (e.g. Chlamydia). Such genes may be essential but only present in the host organism. For instance, Chlamydia trachomatis cannot synthesize purine and pyrimidine nucleotides de novo, so these bacteria are dependent on the nucleotide biosynthetic genes of the host.

Another kind of metabolic dependency, unrelated to cross-species interactions, can be found when bacteria are grown under specific nutrient conditions. For example, more than 100 genes become essential when Escherichia coli is grown on nutrient-limited media. Specifically, isocitrate dehydrogenase (icd) and citrate synthase (gltA) are two enzymes that are part of the tricarboxylic acid (TCA) cycle. Both genes are essential in M9 minimal media (which provides only the most basic nutrients). However, when the media is supplementing with 2-oxoglutarate or glutamate, these genes are not essential any more.

== Gene duplications and alternative metabolic pathways ==
Many genes are duplicated within a genome and many organisms have different metabolic pathways (alternative metabolic pathway) to synthesis same products. Such duplications (paralogs) and alternative metabolic pathways often render essential genes non-essential because the duplicate can replace the original copy. For instance, the gene encoding the enzyme aspartokinase is essential in E. coli. By contrast, the Bacillus subtilis genome contains three copies of this gene, none of which is essential on its own. However, a triple-deletion of all three genes is lethal. In such cases, the essentiality of a gene or a group of paralogs can often be predicted based on the essentiality of an essential single gene in a different species. In yeast, few of the essential genes are duplicated within the genome: 8.5% of the non-essential genes, but only 1% of the essential genes have a homologue in the yeast genome.

In the worm C. elegans, non-essential genes are highly over-represented among duplicates, possibly because duplication of essential genes causes overexpression of these genes. Woods et al. found that non-essential genes are more often successfully duplicated (fixed) and lost compared to essential genes. By contrast, essential genes are less often duplicated but upon successful duplication are maintained over longer periods.

== Conservation ==
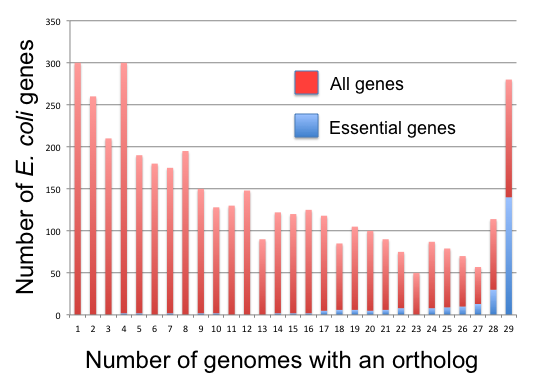
Conservation of essential genes in bacteria, adapted from

In bacteria, essential genes appear to be more conserved than nonessential genes but the correlation is not very strong. For instance, only 34% of the B. subtilis essential genes have reliable orthologs in all Bacillota and 61% of the E. coli essential genes have reliable orthologs in all Gamma-proteobacteria. Fang et al. (2005) defined persistent genes as the genes present in more than 85% of the genomes of the clade. They found 475 and 611 of such genes for B. subtilis and E. coli, respectively. Furthermore, they classified genes into five classes according to persistence and essentiality: persistent genes, essential genes, persistent nonessential (PNE) genes (276 in B. subtilis, 409 in E. coli), essential nonpersistent (ENP) genes (73 in B. subtilis, 33 in E. coli), and nonpersistent nonessential (NPNE) genes (3,558 in B. subtilis, 3,525 in E. coli). Fang et al. found 257 persistent genes, which exist both in B. subtilis (for the Bacillota) and E. coli (for the Gamma-proteobacteria). Among these, 144 (respectively 139) were previously identified as essential in B. subtilis (respectively E. coli) and 25 (respectively 18) of the 257 genes are not present in the 475 B. subtilis (respectively 611 E. coli) persistent genes. All the other members of the pool are PNE genes.

In eukaryotes, 83% of the one-to-one orthologs between Schizosaccharomyces pombe and Saccharomyces cerevisiae have conserved essentiality, that is, they are nonessential in both species or essential in both species. The remaining 17% of genes are nonessential in one species and essential in the other. This is quite remarkable, given that S. pombe is separated from S. cerevisiae by approximately 400 million years of evolution.

In general, highly conserved and thus older genes (i.e. genes with earlier phylogenetic origin) are more likely to be essential than younger genes - even if they have been duplicated.

== Study ==
The experimental study of essential genes is limited by the fact that, by definition, inactivation of an essential gene is lethal to the organism. Therefore, they cannot be simply deleted or mutated to analyze the resulting phenotypes (a common technique in genetics).

There are, however, some circumstances in which essential genes can be manipulated. In diploid organisms, only a single functional copy of some essential genes may be needed (haplosufficiency), with the heterozygote displaying an instructive phenotype. Some essential genes can tolerate mutations that are deleterious, but not wholly lethal, since they do not completely abolish the gene's function.

Computational analysis can reveal many properties of proteins without analyzing them experimentally, e.g. by looking at homologous proteins, function, structure etc. (see also below, Predicting essential genes). The products of essential genes can also be studied when expressed in other organisms, or when purified and studied in vitro.

Conditionally essential genes are easier to study. Temperature-sensitive variants of essential genes have been identified which encode products that lose function at high temperatures, and so only show a phenotype at increased temperature.

== Reproducibility ==
If screens for essential genes are repeated in independent laboratories, they often result in different gene lists. For instance, screens in E. coli have yielded from ~300 to ~600 essential genes (see Table 1). Such differences are even more pronounced when different bacterial strains are used (see Figure 2). A common explanation is that the experimental conditions are different or that the nature of the mutation may be different (e.g. a complete gene deletion vs. a transposon mutant). Transposon screens in particular are hard to reproduce, given that a transposon can insert at many positions within a gene. Insertions towards the 3' end of an essential gene may not have a lethal phenotype (or no phenotype at all) and thus may not be recognized as such. This can lead to erroneous annotations (here: false negatives).

Comparison of CRISPR/cas9 and RNAi screens. Screens to identify essential genes in the human chronic myelogenous leukemia cell line K562 with these two methods showed only limited overlap. At a 10% false positive rate there were ~4,500 genes identified in the Cas9 screen versus ~3,100 in the shRNA screen, with only ~1,200 genes identified in both.

=== Different essential genes in different organisms ===
Different organisms may have different essential genes. For instance, Bacillus subtilis has 271 essential genes. About one-half (150) of the orthologous genes in E. coli are also essential. Another 67 genes that are essential in E. coli are not essential in B. subtilis, while 86 E. coli essential genes have no B. subtilis ortholog. In Mycoplasma genitalium at least 18 genes are essential that are not essential in M. bovis. Many of these different essential genes are caused by paralogs or alternative metabolic pathways.

Such different essential genes in bacteria can be used to develop targeted antibacterial therapies against certain specific pathogens to reduce antibiotic resistance in the microbiome era. Stone et al (2015) have used the difference in essential genes in bacteria to develop selective drugs against the oral pathogen Porphyromonas gingivalis, rather than the beneficial bacteria Streptococcus sanguis.

== Prediction ==
Essential genes can be predicted computationally. However, most methods use experimental data ("training sets") to some extent. Chen et al. determined four criteria to select training sets for such predictions: (1) essential genes in the selected training set should be reliable; (2) the growth conditions in which essential genes are defined should be consistent in training and prediction sets; (3) species used as training set should be closely related to the target organism; and (4) organisms used as training and prediction sets should exhibit similar phenotypes or lifestyles. They also found that the size of the training set should be at least 10% of the total genes to yield accurate predictions. Some approaches for predicting essential genes are:

Comparative genomics. Shortly after the first genomes (of Haemophilus influenzae and Mycoplasma genitalium) became available, Mushegian et al. tried to predict the number of essential genes based on common genes in these two species. It was surmised that only essential genes should be conserved over the long evolutionary distance that separated the two bacteria. This study identified approximately 250 candidate essential genes. As more genomes became available the number of predicted essential genes kept shrinking because more genomes shared fewer and fewer genes. As a consequence, it was concluded that the universal conserved core consists of less than 40 genes. However, this set of conserved genes is not identical to the set of essential genes as different species rely on different essential genes.

A similar approach has been used to infer essential genes from the pan-genome of Brucella species. 42 complete Brucella genomes and a total of 132,143 protein-coding genes were used to predict 1252 potential essential genes, derived from the core genome by comparison with a prokaryote database of essential genes.

Network analysis. After the first protein interaction networks of yeast had been published, it was found that highly connected proteins (e.g. by protein-protein interactions) are more likely to be essential. However, highly connected proteins may be experimental artifacts and high connectivity may rather represent pleiotropy instead of essentiality. Nevertheless, network methods have been improved by adding other criteria and therefore do have some value in predicting essential genes.

Machine Learning. Hua et al. used Machine Learning to predict essential genes in 25 bacterial species.

Hurst index. Liu et al. (2015) used the Hurst exponent, a characteristic parameter to describe long-range correlation in DNA to predict essential genes. In 31 out of 33 bacterial genomes the significance levels of the Hurst exponents of the essential genes were significantly higher than for the corresponding full-gene-set, whereas the significance levels of the Hurst exponents of the nonessential genes remained unchanged or increased only slightly.

Minimal genomes. It was also thought that essential genes could be inferred from minimal genomes which supposedly contain only essential genes. The problem here is that the smallest genomes belong to parasitic (or symbiontic) species which can survive with a reduced gene set as they obtain many nutrients from their hosts. For instance, one of the smallest genomes is that of Hodgkinia cicadicola, a symbiont of cicadas, containing only 144 Kb of DNA encoding only 188 genes. Like other symbionts, Hodgkinia receives many of its nutrients from its host, so its genes do not need to be essential.

Metabolic modelling. Essential genes may be also predicted in completely sequenced genomes by metabolic reconstruction, that is, by reconstructing the complete metabolism from the gene content and then identifying those genes and pathways that have been found to be essential in other species. However, this method can be compromised by proteins of unknown function. In addition, many organisms have backup or alternative pathways which have to be taken into account (see figure 1). Metabolic modeling was also used by Basler (2015) to develop a method to predict essential metabolic genes. Flux balance analysis, a method of metabolic modeling, has recently been used to predict essential genes in clear cell renal cell carcinoma metabolism.

Genes of unknown function. Surprisingly, a significant number of essential genes has no known function. For instance, among the 385 essential candidates in M. genitalium, no function could be ascribed to 95 genes even though this number had been reduced to 75 by 2011. Most of unknown functionally essential genes have potential biological functions related to one of the three fundamental functions.

ZUPLS. Song et al. presented a novel method to predict essential genes that only uses the Z-curve and other sequence-based features. Such features can be calculated readily from the DNA/amino acid sequences. However, the reliability of this method remains a bit obscure.

Essential gene prediction servers. Guo et al. (2015) have developed three online services to predict essential genes in bacterial genomes. These freely available tools are applicable for single gene sequences without annotated functions, single genes with definite names, and complete genomes of bacterial strains. Kong et al. (2019) have developed the ePath database, which can be used to search > 4000 bacterial species for predicting essential genes.

== Essential protein domains ==
Although most essential genes encode proteins, many essential proteins consist of a single domain. This fact has been used to identify essential protein domains. Goodacre et al. have identified hundreds of essential domains of unknown function (eDUFs). Lu et al. presented a similar approach and identified 3,450 domains that are essential in at least one microbial species.

== See also ==
- Essential amino acid
- Essential proteins in protein complexes
- Gene
- Genome
- Minimal genome
- Mutation
