= David Holden =

David Holden may refer to:

- David Holden (journalist)
- David Holden (screenwriter)
- David Holden (microbiologist)
