= Sulcia (disambiguation) =

Sulcia can refer to two different genera of organisms:

- Sulcia, a genus of spiders in the family Leptonetidae
- "Candidatus Sulcia (bacteria)", a monotypic genus including "Ca. Sulcia muelleri"
