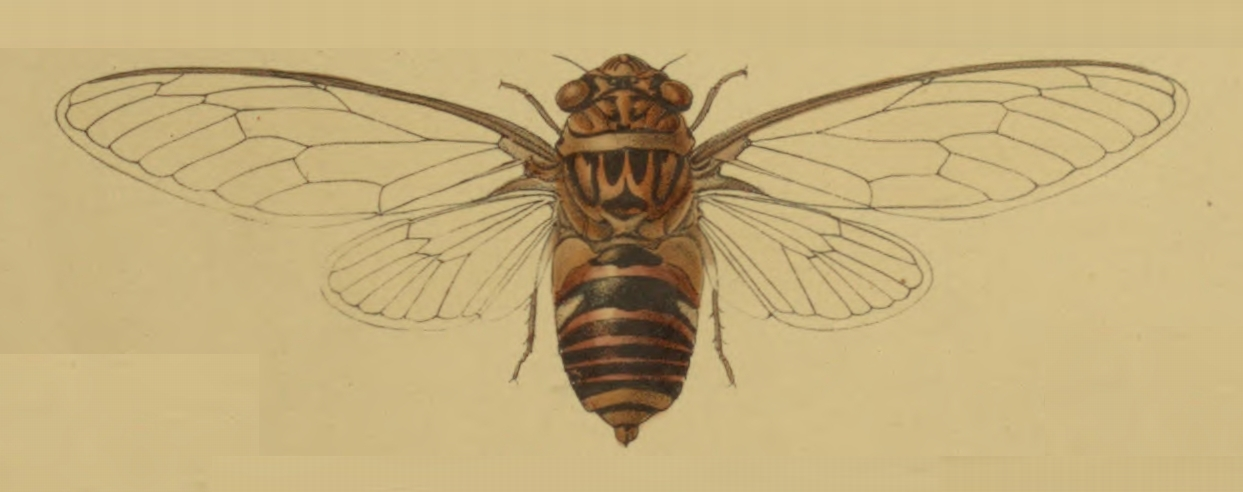
- A monograph of Chremistica tagalica by 'Dr. Aurivillius' in A Monograph of Oriental Cicadas by W. L. Distant.

Scientific classification
- Kingdom: Animalia
- Phylum: Arthropoda
- Clade: Pancrustacea
- Class: Insecta
- Order: Hemiptera
- Suborder: Auchenorrhyncha
- Family: Cicadidae
- Genus: Chremistica
- Species: C. tagalica

Binomial name
- Chremistica tagalica (Stål, 1870)

= Chremistica tagalica =

Species of cicada

Chremistica tagalica is a cicada found in the Malay Archipelago and the Philippines. First described in A Monograph of Oriental Cicadas, it was formerly known as Cicada tagalica. It is "pale olive" in color, with a "broad band" atop its head.
