= Robiginitalea myxolifaciens =

Scientific classification
- Domain: Bacteria
- Kingdom: Pseudomonadati
- Phylum: Bacteroidota
- Class: Flavobacteriia
- Order: Flavobacteriales
- Family: Flavobacteriaceae
- Genus: Robiginitalea
- Species: R. myxolifaciens

Binomial name
- Robiginitalea myxolifaciens Manh et al. 2008

Type strain
- YM6-073

Bacterium

Robiginitalea myxolifaciens is a Gram-negative, strictly aerobic and non-motile bacterium from the genus of Robiginitalea which has been isolated from marine sediments from Okinawa. Robiginitalea myxolifaciens produces the carotenoid (3R,2′S)-myxol.
