= Minimal genome =

Concept in genetics

Gene functions in Syn 3.0, a minimal-genome variant of Mycoplasma genitalium

Minimal genome is the theoretical smallest set of genes sufficient for life to exist and propagate under nutrient-rich and stress-free conditions. Alternatively, it may be defined as the gene set supporting life on an axenic cell culture in rich media, and it is thought what makes up the minimal genome will depend on the environmental conditions that the organism inhabits.

The concept of minimal genome arose from the observations that many genes do not appear to be necessary for survival. Therefore, if a collection of all the essential genes were put together, a minimum genome could be created artificially in a stable environment. By adding more genes, the creation of an organism of desired characteristics is possible.

To create a new organism in this way, a scientist must determine the minimal set of genes required for metabolism and replication, which can be achieved by experimental and computational analysis of their biochemical pathways. A good model for a minimal genome is Mycoplasma genitalium, due to its very small genome size. Most genes that are used by this organism are considered essential for survival, and from them a minimal set of 256 genes has been proposed. Once the set of essential genetic elements are known, one can proceed to define the key pathways and core-players by modeling simulations and wet lab genome engineering.

Scientifically, minimal genome projects allow the identification of the most essential genes and a reduction of genetic complexity, making engineered strains more predictable. Industrially and agriculturally, they could be used to engineer plants to resist herbicides or harsh environments; bacteria to synthetically produce chemicals; or microbes to produce beneficial bio-products.

== Contents ==
According to an early investigation by Mushegian et al., the minimal genome of a bacterium should include a virtually complete set of proteins for replication and translation, a transcription apparatus including four subunits of RNA polymerase including sigma factor proteins sufficient for recombination and repair, several chaperone proteins, the capacity for anaerobic metabolism through glycolysis and substrate-level phosphorylation, transamination of glutamyl-tRNA to glutaminyl-tRNA, lipid (but no fatty acid) biosynthesis, eight cofactor enzymes, protein export machinery, and a limited metabolite transport network including membrane ATPases. Proteins involved in the minimum bacterial genome tend to be substantially closer related to proteins found in archaea and eukaryotes than the average gene in the bacterial genome, indicating a substantial number of universally (or near universally) conserved proteins. The minimal genomes reconstructed on the basis of existing genes do not preclude simpler systems in more primitive cells, such as RNA world genomes which do not need DNA replication machinery, which are otherwise part of the minimal genome of current cells.

The genes which most frequently survive gene loss include those involved in DNA replication, transcription, and translation, although a number of exceptions are known. For example, loss can be frequently seen in subunits of the DNA polymerase holoenzyme and some DNA repair genes. The majority of ribosomal proteins are retained, though some, like rpmC, can be missing. In some cases, certain tRNA synthetases are lost. Gene loss is also seen in genes for components in the cellular envelope, biosynthesis of biomolecules like purine, energy metabolism, and more. Genes that are prone to gene loss without adverse effect can be excluded from minimal genomes.

The minimal genome corresponds to small genome sizes, as bacterial genome size correlates with the number of protein-coding genes, typically one gene per kilobase. Mycoplasma genitalium, with a 580 kb genome and 482 protein-coding genes, is a key model for minimal genomes.

== In nature ==
=== Gene outsourcing ===
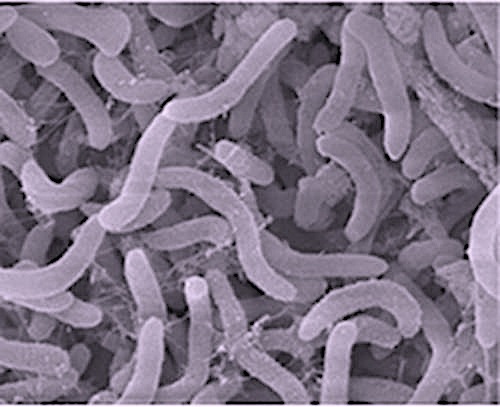
Pelagibacter ubique, the ubiquitous free-living ocean bacterium with the smallest (~1100) number of genes

The smallest known genome of a free-living bacterium is 1.3 Mb with ~1100 genes. However, significantly smaller genomes are commonly observed in naturally occurring symbiotic and parasitic organisms. Genome reduction driven by mutation and genetic drift in small and asexual populations with biases for gene deletion can be seen in symbionts and parasites, which commonly experience rapid evolution, codon reassignments, biases for AT nucleotide compositions, and elevated levels of protein misfolding which results in a heavy dependence on molecular chaperones to ensure protein functionality. These effects coincide with the proliferation of mobile genetic elements, pseudogenes, genome rearrangements, and chromosomal deletion.

This is because the symbiont or parasite can outsource cellular functions to the other organism, and subsequently lose the genes meant to perform the outsourced functions. Beneficial symbionts have a greater capacity for genome reduction than parasites, as host co-adaptation allows them to lose additional genes. Another important distinction between genome reduction in parasites and genome reduction in endosymbionts is that parasites lose both the gene and its associated function, whereas endosymbionts often retain the function of the lost gene since that function is taken over by the host.

=== Endosymbionts ===
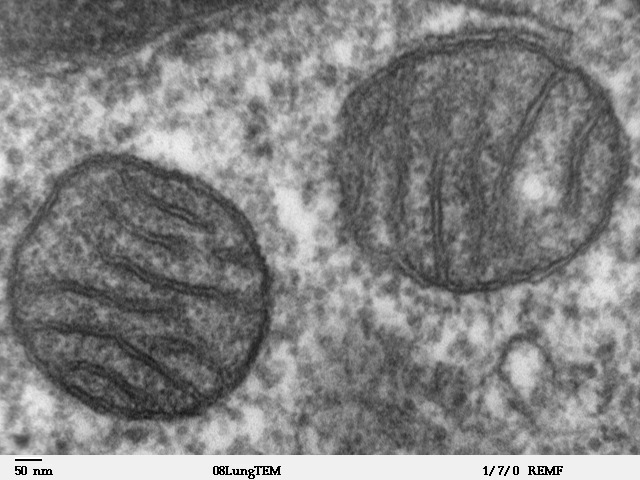
Mammalian mitochondria under an electron microscope

The most extreme examples of genome reduction have been found in maternally transmitted endosymbionts which have experienced lengthy coevolution with their hosts and, in the process, lost a substantial amount of their cellular autonomy. For endosymbionts in some lineages, it is possible for the entire genome to be lost. For example, some mitosomes and hydrogenosomes (degenerate versions of the mitochondria known in some organisms) have experienced a total gene loss and have no remaining genes, whereas the human mitochondria still retains some of its genome. The extant genome in the human mitochondrial organelle is 16.6kb in length and contains 37 genes. The mitochondrial genome can code for between 3 and 67 proteins, which suggests that the last eukaryotic common ancestor encoded a minimum of 70 genes in its genome. The smallest known mitochondrial genome is that of Plasmodium falciparum, with a genome size of 6kb containing three protein-coding genes and a few rRNA genes. (On the other hand, the largest known mitochondrial genome is 490kb.) Genomes nearly as small can also be found in related apicomplexans. Conversely, the mitochondrial genomes of terrestrial plants have expanded to over 200kb with the largest one (at over 11Mb) exceeding the size of the genome of bacteria and even the simplest eukaryotes. Organelles known as plastids in plants (including chloroplasts, chromoplasts, and leucoplasts), once free-living cyanobacteria, typically retain longer genomes on the order of 100-200kb with 80-250 genes. In one analysis of 15 chloroplast genomes, the analyzed chloroplasts had between 60 and 200 genes. Across these chloroplasts, a total of 274 distinct protein-coding genes were identified, and only 44 of them were universally found in all sequenced chloroplast genomes. Examples of organisms which have experienced genome reduction include species of Buchnera, Chlamydia, Treponema, Mycoplasma, and many others. Comparisons of multiple sequenced genomes of endosymbionts in multiple isolates of the same species and lineage have confirmed that even long-time symbionts are still experiencing gene loss and transfer to the nucleus. Nuclear integrants of mitochondrial or plastid DNA have sometimes been termed "numts" and "nupts" respectively.

=== Cellular parasites and insect symbionts ===
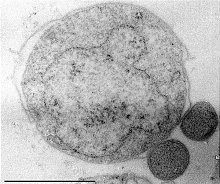
Two Nanoarchaeum equitans cells (and its larger host Ignicoccus)

A number of symbionts have been discovered with genomes under 500 kb in length, the majority of them being bacterial symbionts of insects, typically from the taxa Pseudomonadota and Bacteroidota. The parasitic archaea Nanoarchaeum equitans has a genome 491 kb in length. In 2002, it was found that some species of the genus Buchnera have a reduced genome of only 450 kb in size. In 2021, the endosymbiont Candidatus Azoamicus ciliaticola was found to have a genome 290 kb in length. The symbiont Zinderia insecticola was found to have a genome of 208 kb in 2010. In 2006, another endosymbiont Carsonella ruddii was found with a reduced genome 160 kb in length encompassing 182 protein-coding genes. Surprisingly, it was found that gene loss in Carsonella symbionts is an ongoing process. Intermediate stages in gene loss have been observed in other reduced genomes, including the transition of some genes into pseudogenes because the host carries out the purpose of the gene. The genome of Candidatus Hodgkinia cicadicola, a symbiont of cicadas, was found to be 144 kb. In 2011, Tremblaya princeps was found to contain an intracellular endosymbiont with a genome of 139 kb, reduced to the point that even some translation genes had been lost. A 2013 study found two leafhopper symbionts contained highly reduced genomes: Sulcia muelleri, with a genome of 190 kb, and Nasuia deltocephalinicola with a genome of only 112 kb and 137 protein-coding genes. The genomes of these two symbionts combined can only synthesize ten amino acids, in addition to some of the machinery involved in DNA replication, transcription, and translation. The genes for ATP synthesis through oxidative phosphorylation have been lost, however.

=== Viruses and virus-like particles ===
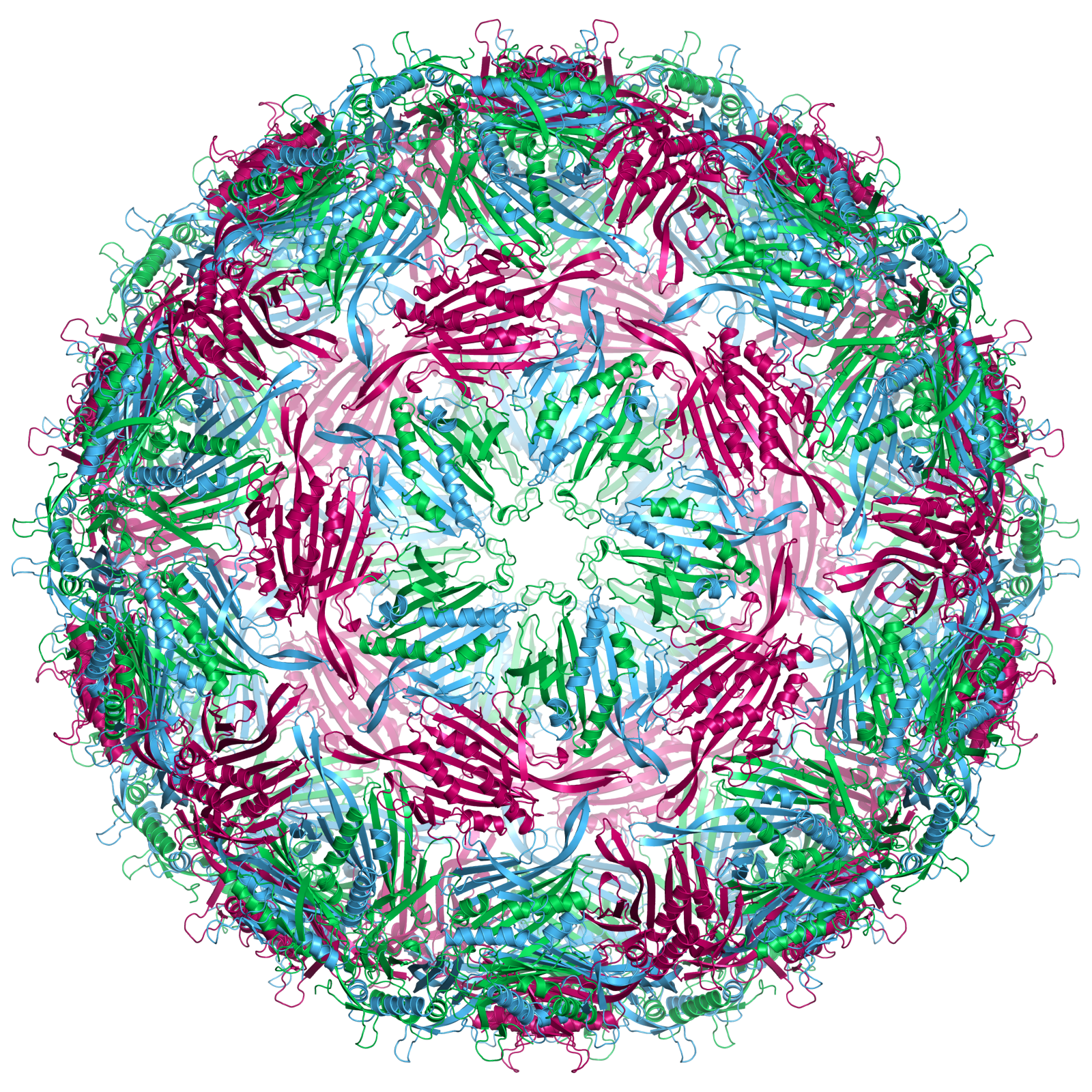
Capsid of the Bacteriophage MS2 capsid (capsule), entirely composed of one protein. Colored by quasi-equivalent conformational variant (a,b,c).

Viruses and virus-like particles have the smallest genomes in nature. For instance, bacteriophage MS2 consists of only 3569 nucleotides (single-stranded RNA) and encodes just four proteins, which overlap to make efficient use of the genome space. Similarly, among eukaryotic viruses, porcine circoviruses are among the smallest. They encode only 2–3 open reading frames. Viroids are circular RNA molecules which do not have any protein-coding genes at all, although the RNA molecule itself acts as a ribozyme to help enable its replication. The genome of a viroid is between 200 and 400 nucleotides in length.

== History ==
=== NASA collaboration ===
The study of minimal genomes arose as a result of a collaborative effort between National Aeronautics and Space Administration (NASA) and two scientists: Harold Morowitz and Mark Tourtellotte. In the 1960s, NASA was searching for extraterrestrial life forms, assuming that if they existed they may be simple creatures. To attract people's attention, Morowitz published about mycoplasmas and how they are the smallest and simplest self-replicating creatures. NASA and the two scientists decided to try to assemble a living cell from the components of mycoplasmas. Mycoplasmas were selected as the best candidate for cell reassembly, since they are composed of a minimum set of organelles, such as a plasma membrane, ribosomes and a circular double stranded DNA. Morowitz' major idea was to define the entire machinery of mycoplasmas cell on the molecular level. He announced that an international effort would help him accomplish this main objective.

The plan consisted of:

1. Physical and functional mapping, with complete sequencing of the mycoplasma
2. Determining the open reading frames (ORFs)
3. Determining the encoded amino acids
4. Understanding the functions of genes
5. Reassembling the mycoplasma's cellular machinery

=== Attempts ===
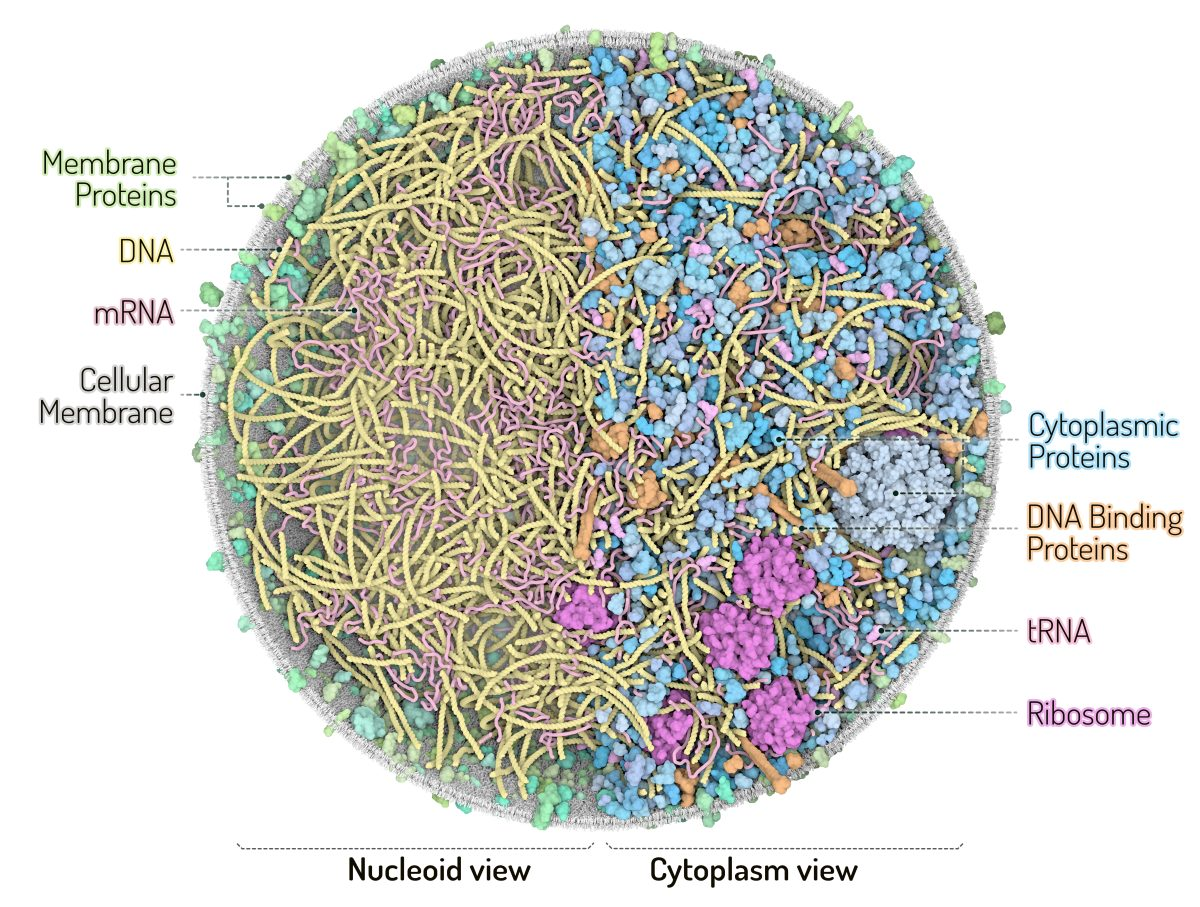
Comprehenseive whole-cell model of Mycoplasma genitalium

By the 1980s, Richard Herrmann's laboratory had fully sequenced and genetically characterized the 800kb genome of M. pneumoniae. Despite the small size of the genome, the process took three years. In 1995, another laboratory from Maryland the Institute for Genomic Research (TIGR) collaborated with the teams of Johns Hopkins and the University of North Carolina. This group chose to sequence the genome of Mycoplasma genitalium, consisting of only 580 kb genome. This was completed in 6 months.

Finding a minimal set of essential genes was done by selective inactivation or deletions of genes and then testing the effect of each under a given set of conditions. The J. Craig Venter institute conducted these types of experiments on M. genitalium and found 382 essential genes.

The J.Craig Venter institute later started a project to create a synthetic organism named Mycoplasma laboratorium, using the minimal set genes identified from M. genitalium.

=== Studies of orthologs ===
As of 1999, the two organisms considered to have a near minimal genome are: Haemophilus influenzae, and M. genitalium. A list of their orthologous proteins were compiled in hope that it would contain the proteins necessary for cell survival, as orthologous analysis determines how two organisms evolved, showing the non-essential genes accumulated in their genomes. Since H. influenza is Gram negative and M. genitalium is Gram positive, and because of their long evolution, it was expected that these organisms would primarily share genes that were of universal importance. However, 244 detected orthologs contained no parasitism-specific proteins. The conclusion of this analysis was that similar biochemical functions might be performed by non-orthologous proteins. Even when biochemical pathways of these two organisms were mapped, several pathways were present but many were incomplete. Proteins determined to be common between the two organisms were non-orthologous.

Much of the research focuses on the ancestral genome, and less on the minimal genome. Studies of these existing genomes have helped determine that orthologous genes found in these two species are not necessarily essential for survival, in fact non-orthologous genes were found to be more important. Also, it was determined that proteins do not need to have the same sequence or three dimensional folds to share the same functions.

== JCVI projects ==
The J. Craig Venter Institute (JCVI) conducted a study to find all the essential genes of M. genitalium through global transposon mutagenesis. As a result, they found that 382 out of 482 protein coding genes were essential. Genes encoding proteins of unknown function constituted 28% of the essential protein coding genes. Before conducting this study, the JCVI had performed another study on the non-essential genes of M.genitalium, where they reported the use of transposon mutagenesis. Despite identifying the non-essential genes, it is not confirmed that the products of these genes have any important biological functions. It was only through gene essentiality studies of bacteria that JCVI was able to compose a hypothetical minimal gene set.

=== 1999 and 2005 publications ===
In JCVI's 1999 study among the two organisms, M. genitalium and Mycoplasma pneumoniae they mapped approximately 2,200 transposon insertion sites and identified 130 putative non-essential genes. In their experiment they grew a set of Tn4001 transformed cells and isolated the genomic DNA. Amplicons were sequenced to detect the transposon insertion sites in mycoplasma genomes. Genes that contained the transposon insertions were hypothetical proteins or proteins considered non-essential.

During this process some of the disruptive genes once considered non-essential, after more analyses were found to be essential. This error could have been because genes were tolerant of the transposon insertions, cells contained two copies of the same gene, or gene products were supplied by more than one cell. Insertion of transposon in a gene meant it was disturbed, but because they did not confirm the absence of gene products they mistook all disrupted genes as non-essential genes. Some of the disrupted genes thought to be essential were isoleucyl and tyrosyl-tRNA synthetases (MG345 and MG455), DNA replication gene dnaA (MG469), and DNA polymerase III subunit a (MG261).

The 1999 study was later expanded, and the updated results were published in 2005. They improved the study by isolating and characterizing M. genitalium Tn4001 insertions in each colony individually, which provided more results and estimates of essential genes. The key improvement in the study was isolating and characterizing individual transposon mutants. Previously, they isolated many colonies containing a mixture of mutants. The filter cloning approach helped in separating the mixtures of mutants.

In the 2005 study, they claim completely different sets of non-essential genes. The 130 non-essential genes claimed at first were reduced to 67. Of the remaining 63 genes, 26 genes were only disrupted in M. pneumoniae which means that some M. genitalium orthologs of non-essential M. pneumoniae genes were actually essential.

They have now identified almost all of the non-essential genes in M. genitalium, the number of gene disruptions based on colonies analyzed plateaued and they claim a total of 100 non-essential genes out of the 482 protein coding genes in M. genitalium.

=== Mycoplasma laboratorium ===
The ultimate result of the JCVI projects came down to constructing a synthetic organism, Mycoplasma laboratorium, based on the 387 protein coding region and 43 structural RNA genes found in M. genitalium.

Researchers at the JCVI in 2010 successfully created a synthetic bacterial cell that was capable of replicating itself. The team synthesized a 1.08 million base pair chromosome of a modified Mycoplasma mycoides, called Mycoplasma mycoides JCVI-syn1.0. The DNA was designed in a computer, synthesized, and transplanted into a cell from which the original genome had been removed. The original molecules and on-going reaction networks of the recipient cell then used the artificial DNA to generate daughter cells. These daughter cells are of synthetic origin and capable of further replication.

The first half of the project took 15 years to complete. The team designed an accurate, digitized genome of M. mycoides. A total of 1,078 cassettes were built, each 1,080 base pairs long. These cassettes were designed in a way that the end of each DNA cassette overlapped by 80 base pairs. The whole assembled genome was transplanted in yeast cells and grown as yeast artificial chromosome.

After further refinement and gene reduction, JCVI-syn3.0 was constructed.

== Number of essential genes ==
The number of essential genes is different for each organism. For instance, the genome of E. coli can be reduced by about 30%, demonstrating that this species can live with much fewer genes than the genome contains in the wild. Each organism has a different number of essential genes, depending on which strain (or individual) is tested. In addition, the number depends on the conditions under which an organism is tested. In several bacteria (or other microbes such as yeast) all or most genes have been deleted individually to determine which genes are "essential" for survival. Such tests are usually carried out on rich media which contain all nutrients. However, if all nutrients are provided, genes required for the synthesis of nutrients are not "essential". When cells are grown on minimal media, many more genes are essential as they may be needed to synthesize such nutrients (e.g. vitamins). The numbers provided in the following table typically have been collected using rich media.

| Organism | Essential Genes |
|---|---|
| Escherichia coli | 1617 |
| Bacillus subtiis | 271 |
| Haemophilus influenzae | 642 |
| Streptococcus pneumoniae | 244 |
| Mycoplasma genitalium | 381 |
| Vibrio cholerae | 779 |
| Staphylococcus aureus | 653 |
| Saccharomyces cerevisiae | 1110 |

The number of essential genes were collected from the Database of Essential Genes (DEG), except for B. subtilis, where the data comes from Genome News Network The organisms listed in this table have been systematically tested for essential genes.

=== Minimal genome projects ===
The following table contains a list of minimal genome projects, finding the number of essential genes for various organisms, (including the various techniques used).

| Year | Organism | Method |
|---|---|---|
| 1996 | H. influenzae, E. coli | In silico comparison of genomes |
| 1998 | H. influenzae, S. pneumoniae | Tn mutagenesis and DNA fingerprinting |
| 1999 | M. genitalium | Saturating Tn mutagenesis |
| 2000 | V. cholerae | Tn mutagenesis and arabinose promoter |
| 2001 | S. aureus | Antisense RNA |
| 2001 | M. bovis | Tn mutagenesis and microarray |
| 2002 | H. influenzae | Tn mutagenesis and DNA fingerprinting |
| 2002 | Buchnera spp | Sequence comparison |
| 2002 | S. cerevisiae | Systematic gene deletion |
| 2002 | S. aureus | Antisense RNA |
| 2002 | E. coli | Red recombinase excision |
| 2002 | E. coli | Cre/loxP excision |
