= Robiginitalea biformata =

Scientific classification
- Domain: Bacteria
- Kingdom: Pseudomonadati
- Phylum: Bacteroidota
- Class: Flavobacteriia
- Order: Flavobacteriales
- Family: Flavobacteriaceae
- Genus: Robiginitalea
- Species: R. biformata

Binomial name
- Robiginitalea biformata Cho and Giovannoni 2004

Bacterium

Robiginitalea biformata is a Gram-negative, chemoheterotrophic and non-motile bacterium from the genus of Robiginitalea which has been isolated from the Sargasso Sea.
