= Robiginitalea sediminis =

Scientific classification
- Domain: Bacteria
- Kingdom: Pseudomonadati
- Phylum: Bacteroidota
- Class: Flavobacteriia
- Order: Flavobacteriales
- Family: Flavobacteriaceae
- Genus: Robiginitalea
- Species: R. sediminis

Binomial name
- Robiginitalea sediminis Zhang et al. 2020

Type strain
- O458

Bacterium

Robiginitalea sediminis is a Gram-negative, strictly aerobic and non-motile bacterium from the genus of Robiginitalea which has been isolated from sediments from a pond which was cultivated with sea cucumbers in Rongcheng in China.
