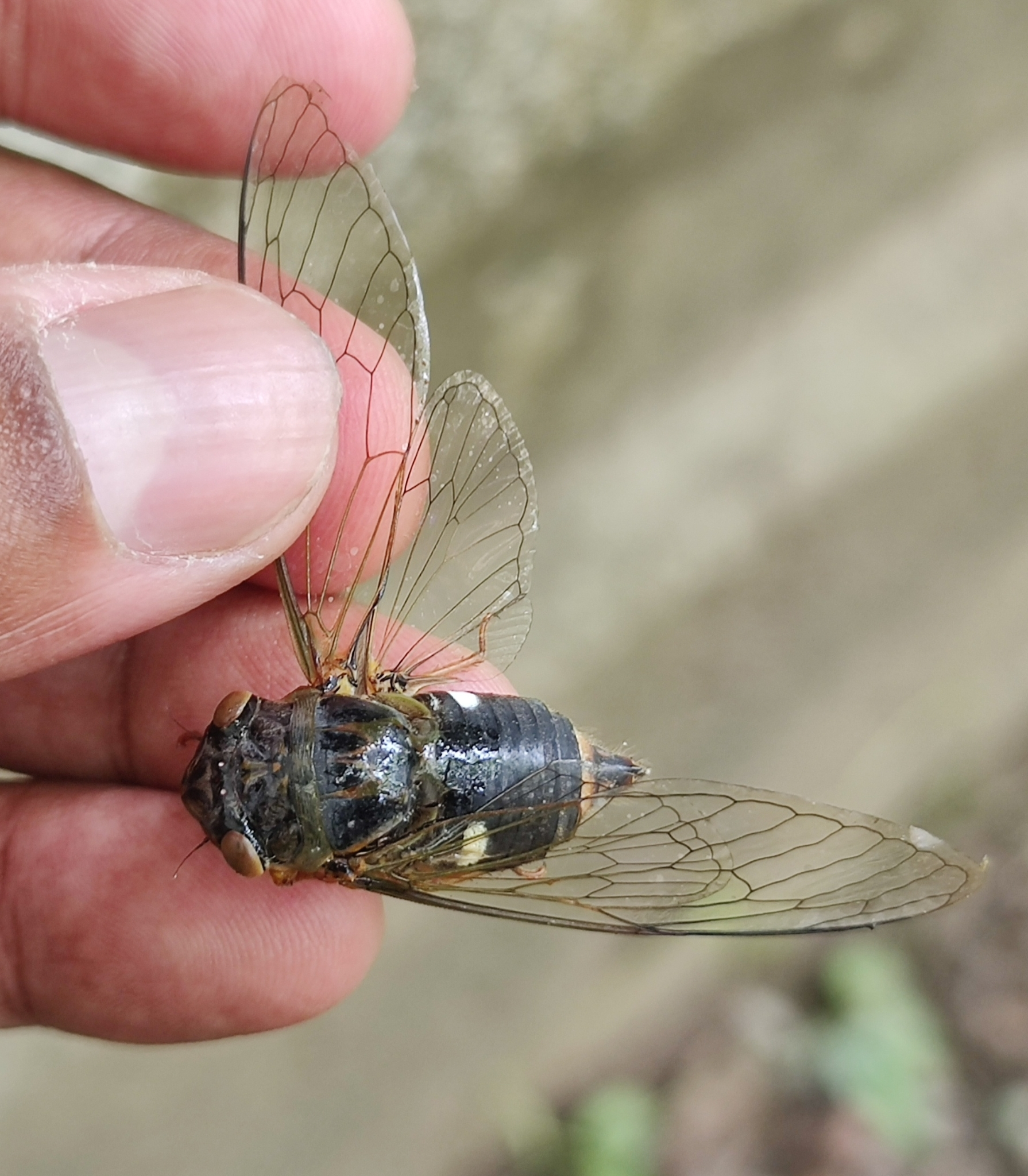

Scientific classification
- Kingdom: Animalia
- Phylum: Arthropoda
- Clade: Pancrustacea
- Class: Insecta
- Order: Hemiptera
- Suborder: Auchenorrhyncha
- Family: Cicadidae
- Genus: Chremistica
- Species: C. ribhoi

Binomial name
- Chremistica ribhoi Hajong & Yaakop, 2013

= Chremistica ribhoi =

Species of cicada

Chremistica ribhoi, also known as the world cup cicada, is a species of cicada found in northeastern India. It was described in 2013 by Sudhanya Ray Hajong and Salmah Yaakop.

== Etymology ==
The specific epithet ribhoi refers to Ri-Bhoi district, where this cicada species was collected. It is also called world cup cicada because it emerges every four years, lining up with the FIFA World Cup.

== Description ==
Chremistica ribhoi has a triangular head and is black with brown markings. Its legs are brown with black spots on the backside of the coxae. The color of the wing venation ranges from yellow to black. White hairs grow behind the eyes and on the femora. The body length of males ranges between 25-28mm, and females measure between 25-26mm.

== Distribution ==
The species is found in Ri-Bhoi district in India.

== Biology ==
The species feeds on sap, which is not very nutritious. Because of this, Chremistica ribhoi constantly discharges the superfluous fluid while feeding.

The volume of the song of this cicada can reach up to 100 decibels.

== In culture ==
Chremistica ribhoi is considered a delicacy in Ri-Bhoi district. Recently emerged cicadas are collected, fried, and eaten, while the exoskeleton is still soft.
