= David Holden (microbiologist) =

British microbiologist

David William Holden FRS FMedSci
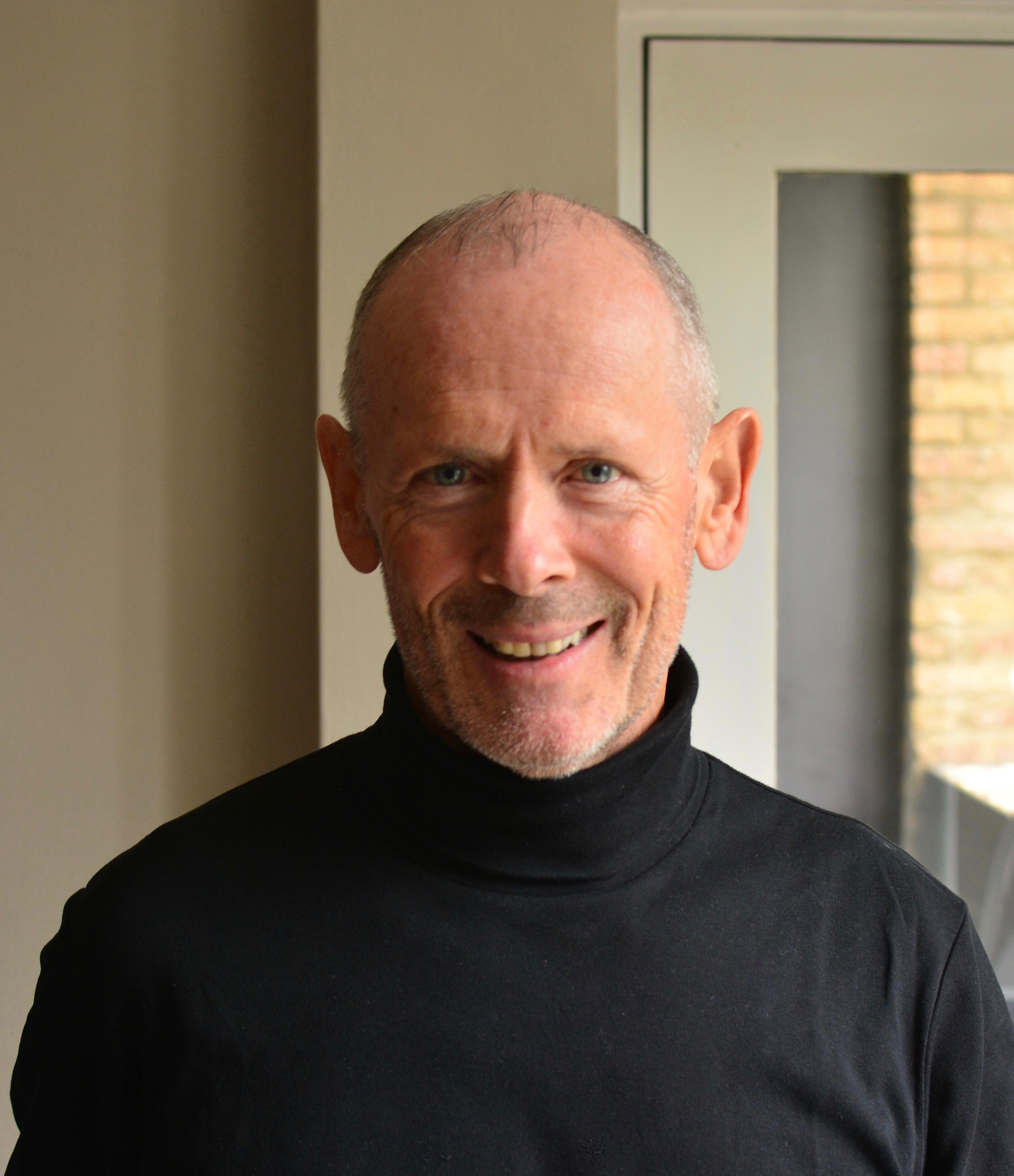
- Born: 3 November 1955 (age 70)
- Education: George Watson’s College, Edinburgh; University of Durham (B.Sc); University College London (PhD)
- Awards: Marjory Stephenson Award, Society for General Microbiology (2000); EMBO Member (2011); Fellow of the Royal Society (2004); Regius Professorship (2016); Microbiology Society Prize Medal (2024)
- Scientific career
- Fields: Bacteriology
- Institutions: Imperial College London

David William Holden FRS FMedSci is a British microbiologist. He was Director of the MRC Centre for Molecular Bacteriology and Infection at Imperial College London between 2012 and 2019. Holden was appointed as the first Regius Professor of Infectious Disease in the UK, at Imperial College London from 2016 to 2024, and currently holds the title of emeritus Professor of Infectious Disease.

== Background ==
Holden was born in Newcastle-upon-Tyne in 1955 to Bronwen and John Holden. When he was 15, the family moved to Edinburgh, where he completed his secondary education at George Watson’s College. He obtained a B.Sc. Hons degree from Durham University in 1977, and received his PhD in microbiology from University College London in 1981. After post-doctoral work in Canada the US and at the National Institute for Medical Research, he joined the Royal Postgraduate Medical School (which later merged into Imperial College London) as a lecturer in 1990, and was promoted to Professor of Molecular Microbiology in 1995.

== Research ==
=== Signature-tagged mutagenesis/mutant barcoding ===
Holden invented signature-tagged mutagenesis (STM; also called mutant barcoding) for identification of mutants with altered growth in mixed populations This involves the creation of mutant cells labeled with unique identifying DNA sequence tags (barcodes), which enable the fates of large numbers of different mutants to be followed simultaneously. The technique represents the conceptual basis for subsequent multiplexed mutant screens that involve (a) the generation of mutants carrying unique DNA barcodes (b) combining them to create an ‘input’ pool, (c) subjecting the pool to selection, (d) collection of an ‘output’ pool and (e) comparison of barcode abundance in ‘input’ and ‘output’ pools to identify mutants of interest. This approach and its derivatives (such as Transposon insertion sequencing, or TnSeq) have proved extremely popular in genetic research since 1995. They have been used in studies of virtually all bacterial pathogens that are amenable to genetic analysis, many fungi, parasites and in mammalian cells, where it is frequently combined with CRISPR-mediated mutagenesis. His invention therefore transformed high-throughput functional genetics. Several patents on the barcoding technology were granted and licensed to pharmaceutical companies.

=== Further research ===
Holden’s group first applied STM to Salmonella in a mouse model of typhoid fever. This led to his team’s discovery of a pathogenicity island, SPI-2, which is required for systemic growth of this pathogen in its mammalian hosts and encodes a type III secretion system (injectisome) that delivers virulence proteins into host cells from the intracellular Salmonella-containing vacuole (SCV). Subsequently, his group revealed how the assembly of the secretion system and translocation of virulence proteins are regulated. His team elucidated the biochemical functions of several SPI-2 virulence proteins, provided a molecular understanding of how two of them anchor the SCV to a host cell organelle and showed that another maintains the integrity of the SCV while preventing it from maturing into a phagolysosome. His group characterised processes by which other Salmonella proteins subvert both innate and adaptive immunity. The discovery of the SPI-2 T3SS stimulated many other research groups to study its function; collectively these advances have provided an understanding of the physiological basis of systemic pathogenesis of Salmonella.

== Honours and other work ==
In 1997 Holden co-founded the Imperial College spin-out vaccine company Microscience, which was acquired in 2005 by Emergent Biosolutions. Holden has served on the Board of Reviewing Editors for Science magazine and scientific advisory boards of several European research institutions. He trained numerous scientists at PhD and post-doctoral levels; many of these individuals have gone on to have highly successful careers in industry or as independent scientists who lead research groups in Universities and Research Institutes around the world. He is an EMBO Member and a Fellow of the European Academy of Microbiology, the American Academy of Microbiology and the Academy of Medical Sciences. Holden was made a Fellow of the Royal Society in 2004. In 2024 he received the UK Microbiology Society Prize Medal, awarded to ‘individuals who are global leaders in their field and have made a far-reaching impact beyond the field of microbiology’.
