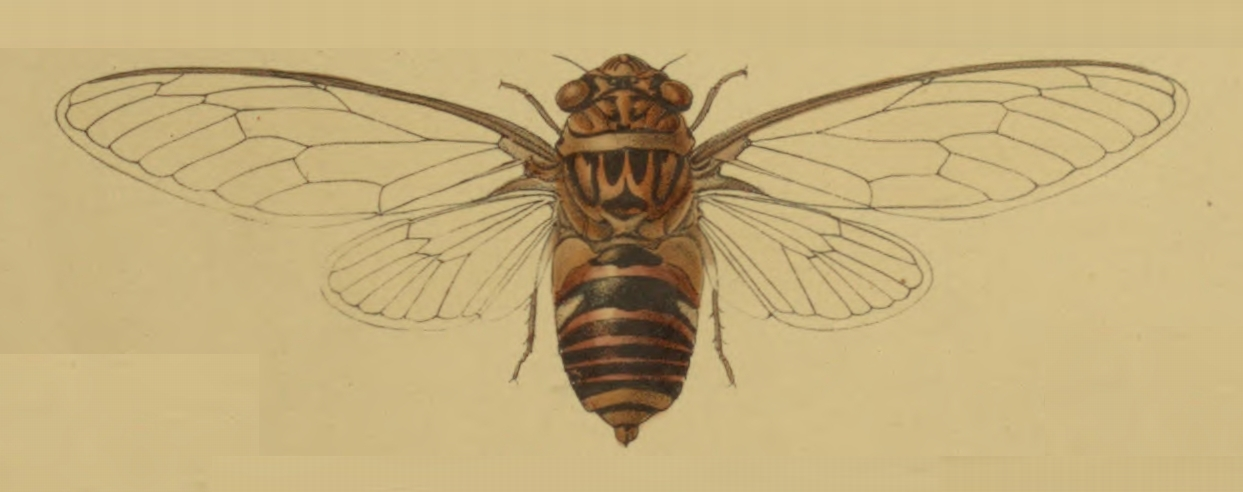
- Chremistica tagalica

Scientific classification
- Kingdom: Animalia
- Phylum: Arthropoda
- Clade: Pancrustacea
- Class: Insecta
- Order: Hemiptera
- Suborder: Auchenorrhyncha
- Family: Cicadidae
- Tribe: Tacuini
- Subtribe: Tacuina
- Genus: Chremistica; Stål, 1870

= Chremistica =

Genus of true bugs

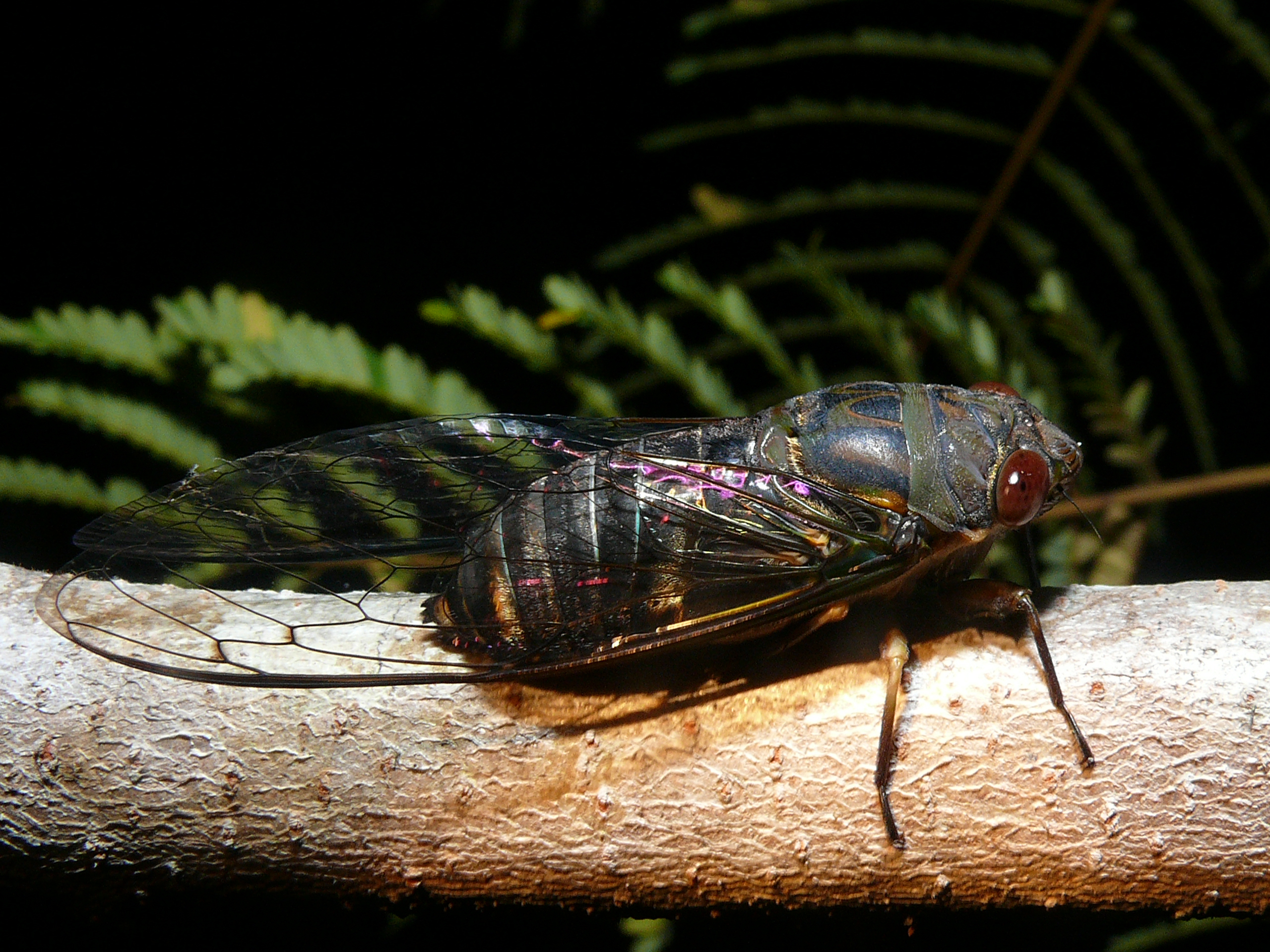
Chremistica pontianaka, Malaysia

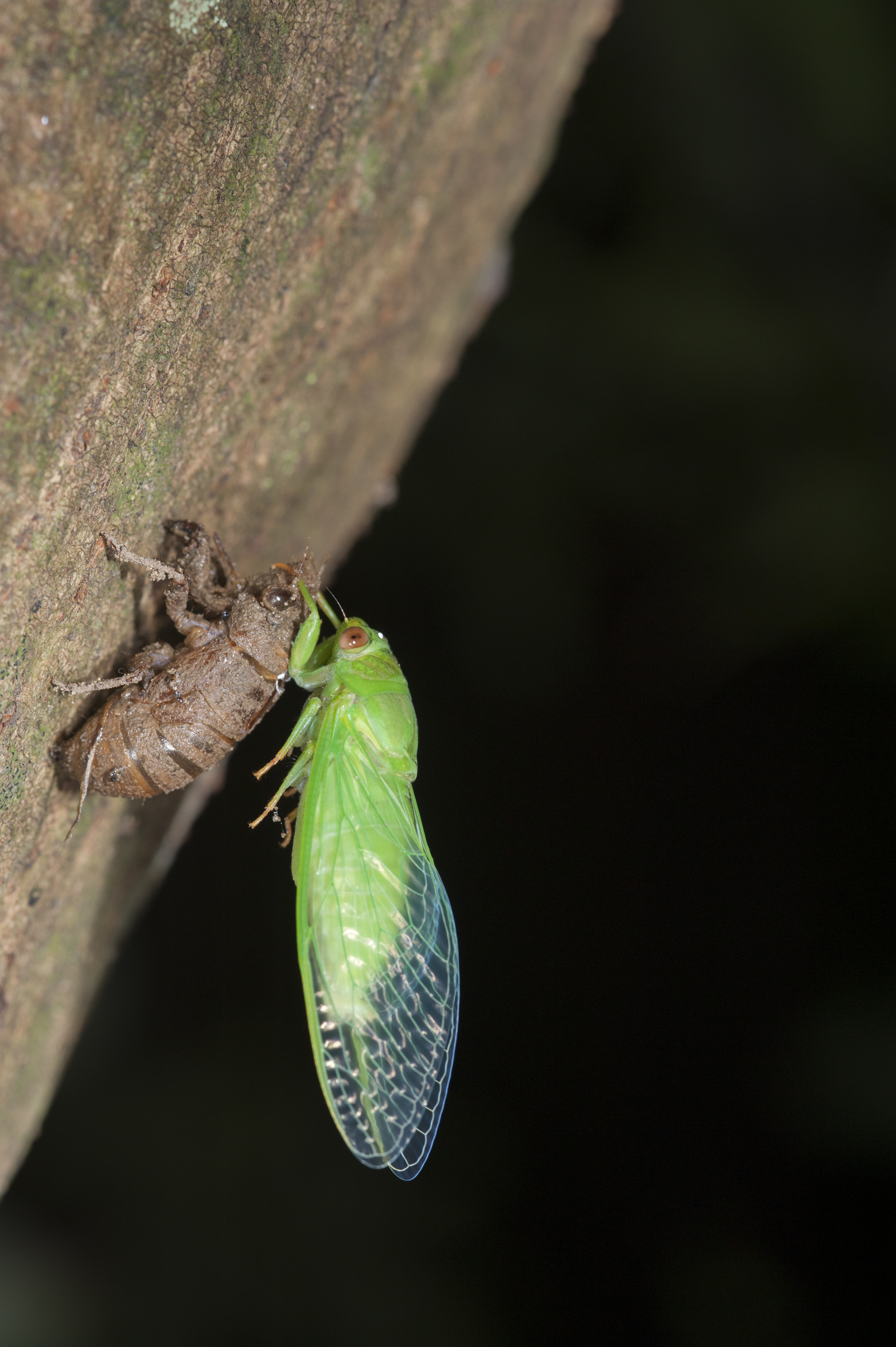
Chremistica ochracea

Chremistica is a genus of cicadas from Southeast Asia and Madagascar. Its distribution encompasses India, Sri Lanka, continental South East Asia, Taiwan, Philippines, Malayan Peninsula, Sumatra, Borneo and Java, the Lesser Sunda Islands, viz., Lombok, Sumba, Sumbawa and Timor, and Sulawesi, while one group of species is recorded from Madagascar

== Species ==
These 49 species belong to the genus Chremistica:

- Chremistica atra (Distant, 1909) (Philippines)
- Chremistica atratula Boulard, 2007 (Thailand)
- Chremistica atrovirens (Guérin-Méneville, 1838) (Southeast Asia, China, Sri Lanka)
- Chremistica banksi Liu, 1940
- Chremistica biloba Bregman, 1985 (Borneo, Indonesia)
- Chremistica borneensis Yaakop & Duffels, 2005 (Borneo)
- Chremistica brooksi Yaakop & Duffels, 2005 (Indonesia)
- Chremistica cetacauda Yaakop & Duffels, 2005 (Indonesia)
- Chremistica coronata (Distant, 1889) (Indonesia)
- Chremistica echinaria Yaakop & Duffels, 2005 (Malaysia, Thailand)
- Chremistica euterpe (Walker, 1850)
- Chremistica flavialata Lee & Marshall, 2023
- Chremistica germana (Distant, 1888) (India, Southeast Asia)
- Chremistica guamusangensis Salmah & Zaidi, 2002 (Thailand, Malaysia)
- Chremistica hollowayi Yaakop & Duffels, 2005 (Malaysia, Indonesia)
- Chremistica inthanonensis Boulard, 2006 (Southeast Asia)
- Chremistica kecil Salmah & Zaidi, 2002 (Malaysia)
- Chremistica kyoungheeae Lee, 2010 (Philippines)
- Chremistica longa Lei, Chou & Li, 1995 (China)
- Chremistica maculata Chou & Lei, 1997 (China)
- Chremistica malayensis Yaakop & Duffels, 2005 (Thailand, Malaysia)
- Chremistica minor Bregman, 1985 (Malaysia, Borneo, Indonesia)
- Chremistica mixta (Kirby, 1891) (Sri Lanka)
- Chremistica moultoni Boulard, 2002 (Southeast Asia)
- Chremistica mussarens Boulard, 2005 (Thailand)
- Chremistica nana Chen, 1943 (China)
- Chremistica nesiotes Breddin, 1905 (Malaysia, Thailand, Indonesia)
- Chremistica niasica Yaakop & Duffels, 2005 (Indonesia)
- Chremistica nigra Chen, 1940 (China)
- Chremistica numida (Distant, 1911) (Thailand, China)
- Chremistica ochracea (Walker, 1850) (China)
- Chremistica operculissima (Distant, 1897)
- Chremistica phamiangensis Boulard, 2009 (Thailand)
- Chremistica polyhymnia (Walker, 1850) (Philippines)
- Chremistica pontianaka (Distant, 1888) (Malaysia, Philippines, Indonesia, Thailand)
- Chremistica ribhoi Hajong & Yaakop, 2013 (India)
- Chremistica seminigra (Distant, 1909) (India)
- Chremistica semperi (Stål, 1870) (Philippines)
- Chremistica siamensis Bregman, 1985 (Thailand, Malaysia)
- Chremistica sibilussima Boulard, 2006 (Thailand)
- Chremistica sueuri Pham & Constant, 2013 (Vietnam)
- Chremistica sumatrana Yaakop & Duffels, 2005
- Chremistica tagalica (Stål, 1870) (Philippines)
- Chremistica timorensis (Distant, 1892)
- Chremistica tondana (Walker, 1868) (Indonesia)
- Chremistica tridentigera (Breddin, 1905) (Philippines, India, Brunei, Borneo, Malaysia)
- Chremistica umbrosa (Distant, 1904) (Malaysia, Singapore)
- Chremistica viridis (Fabricius, 1803) (Southeast Asia)
- † Chremistica beauchampi (Piton, 1940)
