= Robiginitalea =

Scientific classification
- Domain: Bacteria
- Kingdom: Pseudomonadati
- Phylum: Bacteroidota
- Class: Flavobacteriia
- Order: Flavobacteriales
- Family: Flavobacteriaceae
- Genus: Robiginitalea; Cho and Giovannoni 2004

Species
- R. biformata R. myxolifaciens R. sediminis

Bacterium

Robiginitalea is a genus of bacteria from the family of Flavobacteriaceae.
