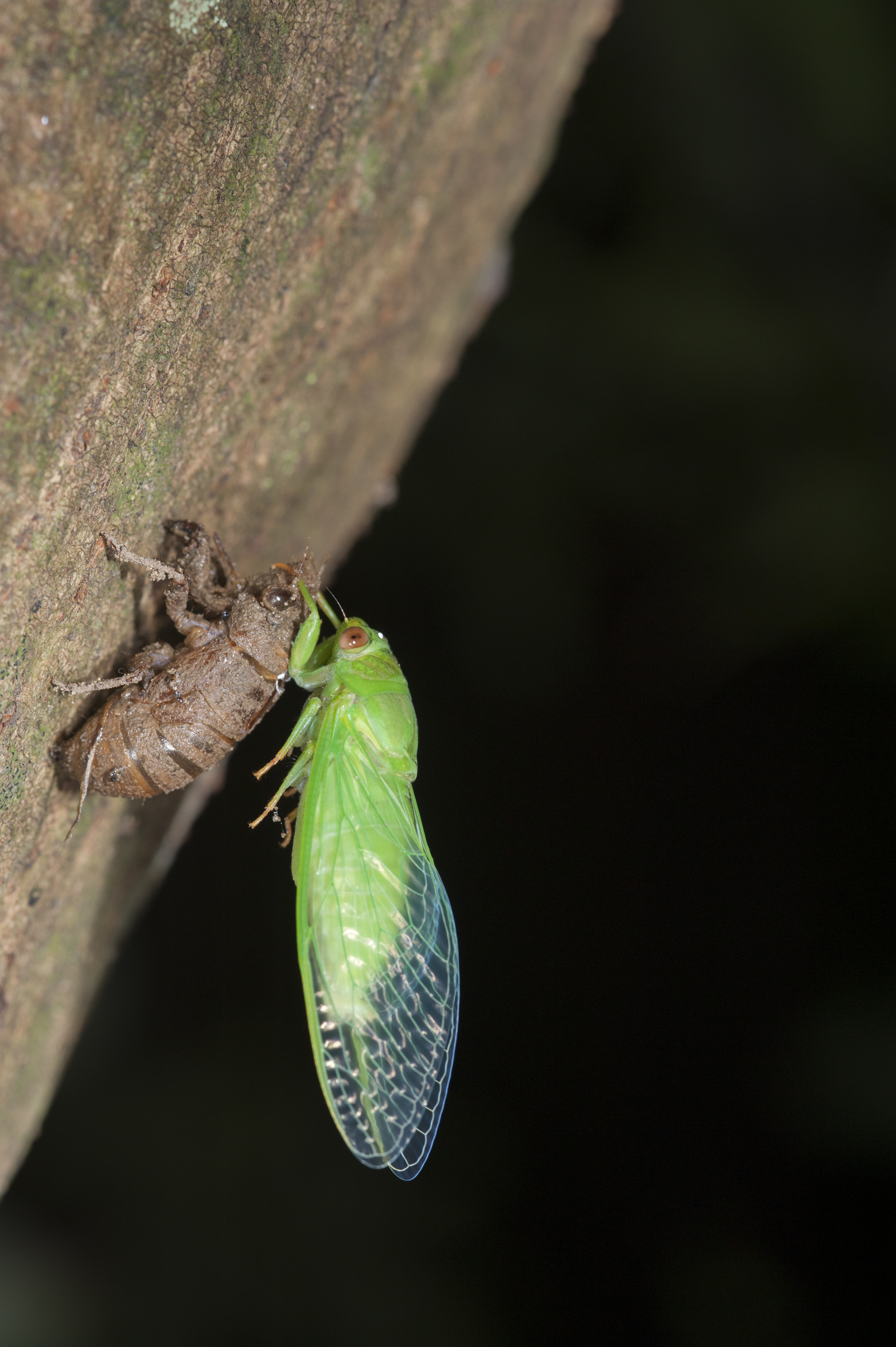
- Chremistica ochracea emerging from its exuvia and waiting for the wings to harden for its first flight.

Scientific classification
- Kingdom: Animalia
- Phylum: Arthropoda
- Clade: Pancrustacea
- Class: Insecta
- Order: Hemiptera
- Suborder: Auchenorrhyncha
- Family: Cicadidae
- Genus: Chremistica
- Species: C. ochracea

Binomial name
- Chremistica ochracea (Walker, 1850)

= Chremistica ochracea =

Species of true bug

Chremistica ochracea (Walker, 1850) is a species of cicada in the suborder Auchenorrhyncha, which includes cicadas, leafhoppers, planthoppers, treehoppers, froghoppers and spittlebugs. They are usually referred to as 'thin winged cicada' in Taiwan and 'peaceful cicada' in China due to their abundance in these areas. They can be identified by their green appearance with thin, greenish, transparent wings and are heavily distributed in China, Taiwan, Japan, India and Malaya. However, there are limited number of scientific papers that describe the characteristics and behaviour of this species in detail.

They are also used to be known as Rihana ochracea which was introduced by Distant (1904), claiming Rihana as a new genus. Genus Rihana however, was also known as a subgenus of Cicada Linnaeus and to some species from Cicada Stål, Chremistica Stål and Diceroprocta Stål.

== Characteristics ==
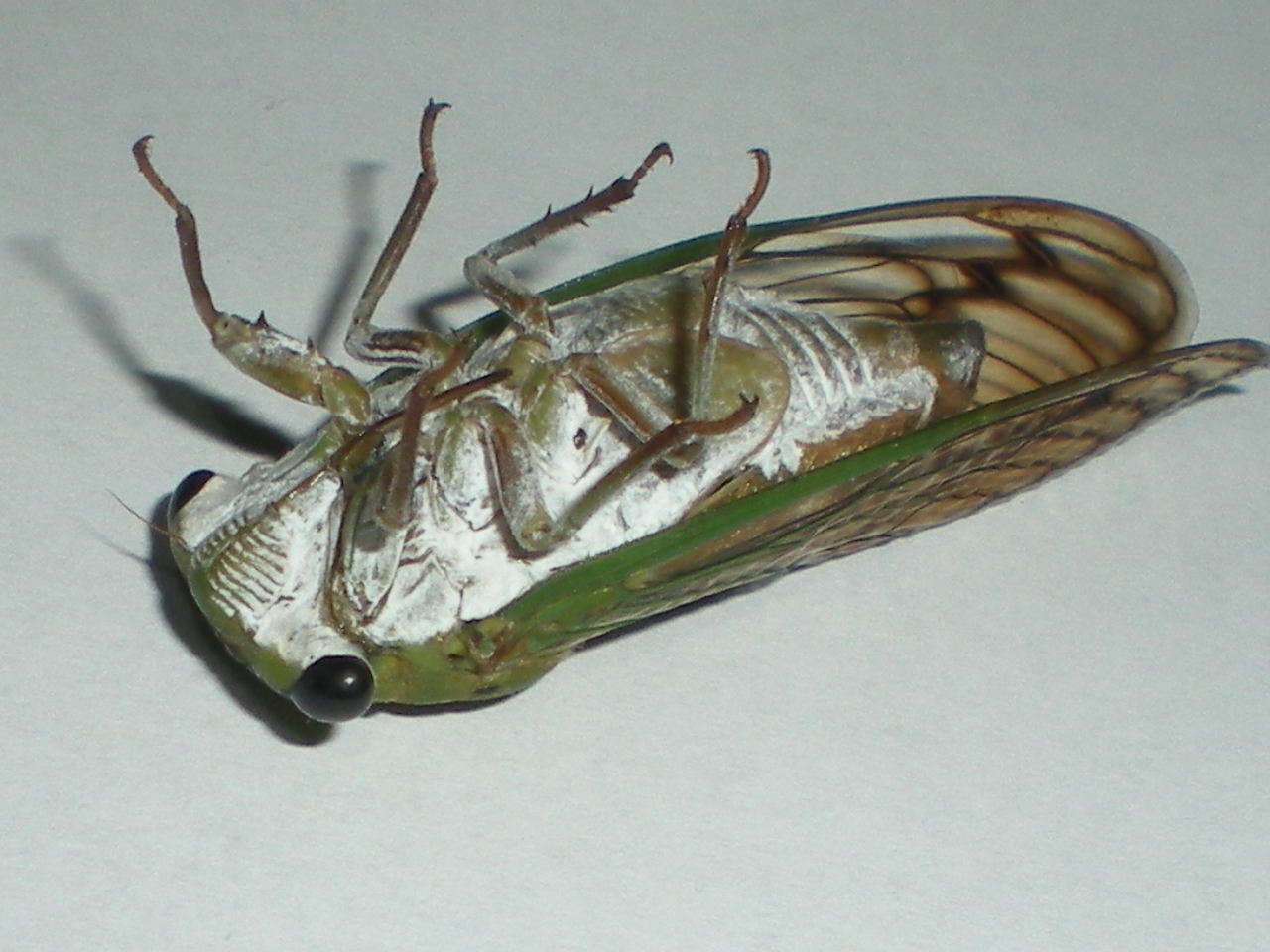
The operculum can be seen clearly on this cicada (not Chremistica ochracea). It is round and greenish, located on the abdomen, close to the thorax.

Based on diagnosis on all Chremistica species erected by Stål in 1870, their eyes are small or medium-sized, very prominent laterally and set widely apart on their triangular head with the piece of frontoclypeus anteriorly prominent. Its tymbal is completely covered with tymbal covering. By looking at the abdomen, the 8th tergum will appear much longer than the 7th tergum in median length. Their femurs on the forelegs have two big spines with several small spines on the ventral part of the forelegs. The operculum of males are longitudinal and overlapped each other but not exceeding the posterior margin of the third abdominal sternum. In most cases, the apex of the operculum is broadly rounded and can be obviously seen by the naked eye.

Last molting of a cicada from its exuvia (not C. ochracea) giving rise to a winged imago.

Some of these species may have light green, earthy red or yellow (ochreous) coloured body. A transverse black fascia can be seen along its anterior head margin and black markings on margin of each ocellus near to its castaneous eyes. Their ventral side can appear powdery or scaly (pollinosity) white on a pale ochreous or pale green body surface. Similar to majority of other cicadas, their wings are translucent and glassy (hyaline) without any darkening marks or tinge (infuscation). A full adult cicada, or also known as an imago, can grow up to 31 mm (1.2 in) in body length for males, 24.4 mm (0.96 in) for female cicadas. Their total length however, can reach up to 45 mm (1.8 in) for male cicadas and 43 mm (1.7 in) for females.

Cicadas of the genus Chremistica are placed in the tribe Tibicenini along with Tibicen Latreille, Cryptotympana Stål, Anapsaltoda Ashton and Neopsaltoda Distant. According to entomologist Hayashi (1987), the genera under the tribe Tibicenini share the same sound-production characteristics, external morphology and male genitalia, allowing them to be classified under the same monophyletic group.

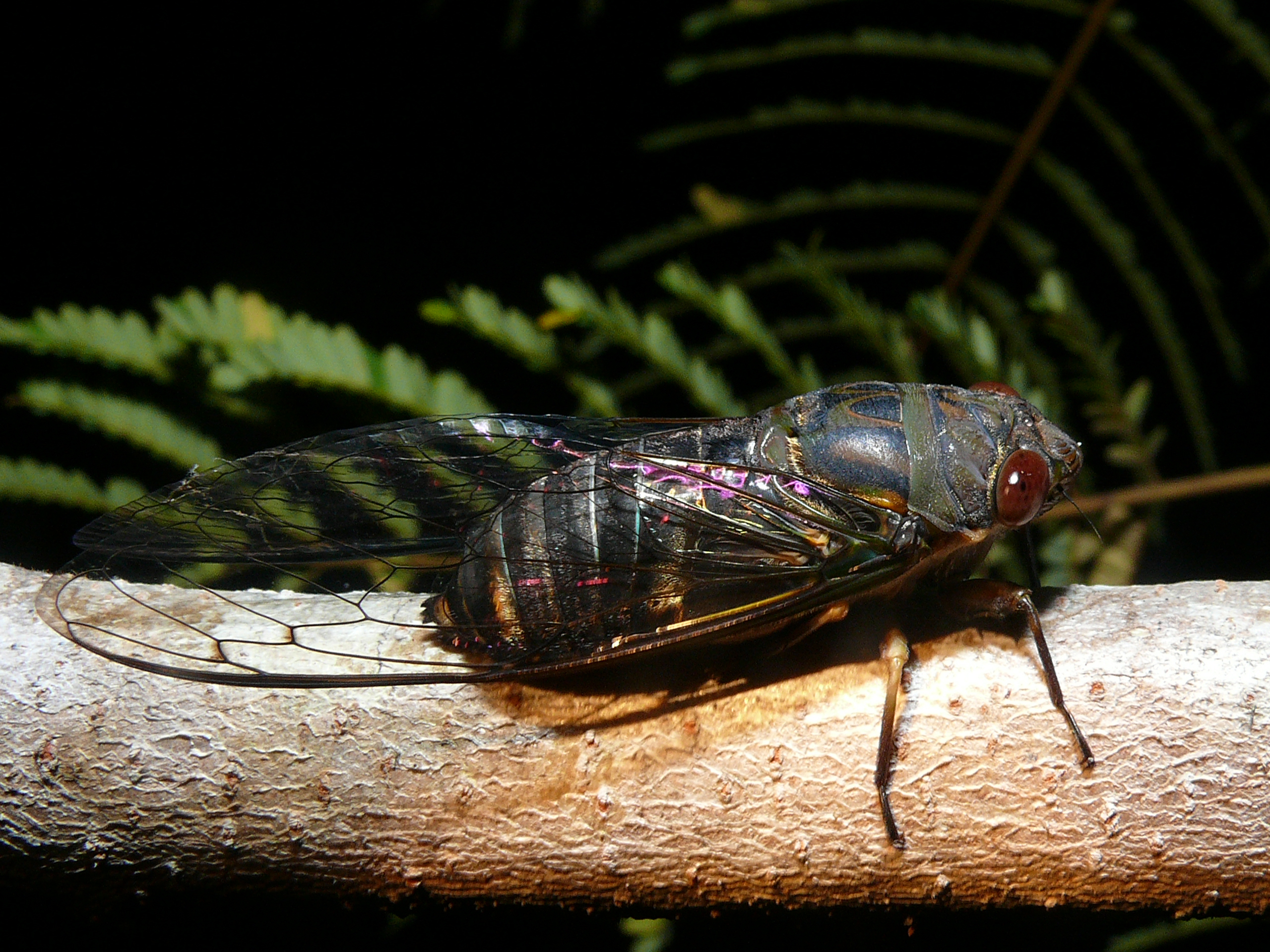
Chremistica pontianaka seen resting on a branch in Malaysia. They are very different to Chremistica ochracea due to their dark coloured body and dark red eyes, also the transparent or hyaline wings but with a darker outline.

Regarding grouping, Chremistica ochracea is placed under the pontianaka group due to their external morphology similarity and characteristics of the male genitalia. The researchers have come to a conclusion that cicadas under the pontianaka group are absent with arc-shaped lateral clasper lobes. Their medial and lateral clasper lobes however, are well developed when compared to other cicada species.

== Biology ==
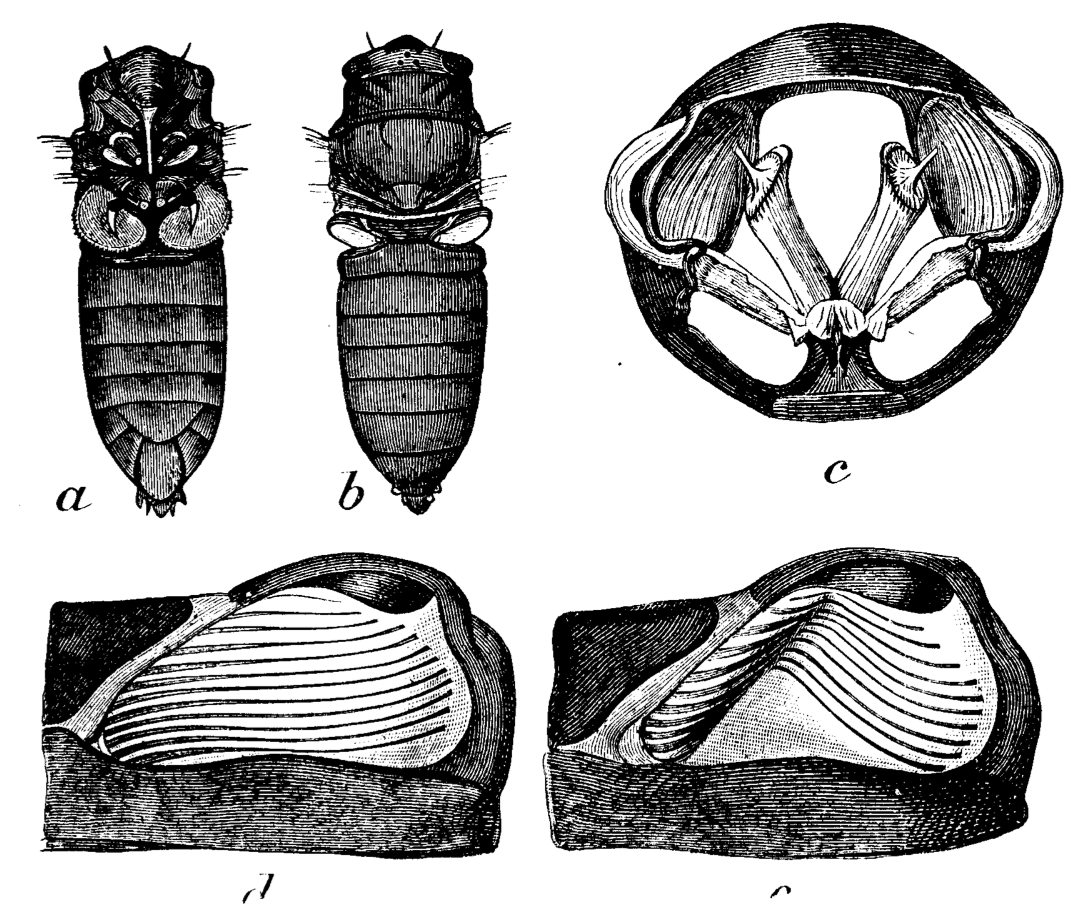
Cicada sound-producing organs and musculature. a, Body of male from below, showing cover-plates (operculum); b, From above, showing drumlike tymbals; c, Section, muscles that vibrate tymbals; d, A tymbal at rest; e, Tymbal thrown into vibration, as when singing.

This species is commonly found in the lowlands and low montane areas of Taiwan, the Oriental region and America. Some are also seen in parts of Peninsular Malaysia. They are reported to be more abundant in plantation areas and fragmented forests of Taiwan, but not much in continuous forests. C. ochracea cicadas are reported to emerge earlier than other cicada species that are found in the same areas, including their nymphs. This suggests that they are a highly adaptive species with a high survival rate. This is also consistent with their wide variety of use (as food source, habitat, exuviation process) in host plants, as they are less choosy as compared to other cicada species.

Their exuviae (singular exuvia), which are the outer cast-off skin, can be found in large numbers after a rainy season. This due to the fact that the survival of hatching cicada eggs positively correlates to increasing humidity. The exuviae are usually found on barks of trees and the position or height above the ground is influenced by the size of the nymphs. It is suggested that nymphs with a larger body size have better water content thus allowing them to climb higher and longer with the advantage of reduced transpiration due to their smaller surface area to volume ratio.

The adult species are actively found in April to September, where males will sing to attract the females around their area. The male singing sounds like a chorus, starting with one male then followed by the males in the nearby area, and the song will finish at the same time. This ritual usually happens in the evening, often during the early season. Adult cicadas are seen active during the day, usually spotted sitting on twigs in the month of June and July, and are known to be very attracted to light during night time, similar to the behaviour of moths and other flying insects at night. The chirping/buzzing sound is only produced by adult males and the sound is monotonous with a continuous buzzing. The male singing will normally last from tens of seconds to a few minutes and finishes at once.

== Use in research ==
=== Noise pollution ===
As cicadas use loud, distinct callings to attract their mates, they are sometimes used to study the impact of noise pollution to the wild. They are hypothesised to have adapted to the noise from urban environments (sounds produced by motor vehicles, industrial economy, constructions or even loud music), but more understanding of how anthropogenic noise affecting these insects are needed. A study was carried out by comparing the number of cicada species and measuring each of their calling activity pattern and acoustic features between the city areas and mountain areas of Taiwan using automated digital recording systems. They found out that there are a lesser number of cicada species in the urban environment, which correlates to the higher levels of anthropogenic noise, as compared to the findings from the mountain site. This suggests that there are fewer species that can tolerate anthropogenic noise, thus more cicada species prefer to inhibit mountain areas than the city areas for a better chance of reproduction and survival. The lower number of species in the urban landscapes however, gives advantage to the cicadas in the urban environment as they experience lesser inter-specific masking affect, hence their songs are less likely to be overlapped, not heard or confused by the female cicadas. Although cicadas from the different environments experienced different anthropogenic and inter-specific noise pressures, they both possess close partitioning strategy. It is reported that there are low spectral overlap in both environments, thus partitioning the frequency domain are used by the cicadas to reduce the masking interference.

=== Mercury levels in soil ===
In another study, C. ochracea was collected to measure mercury levels in terrestrial subtropical forested systems (air, soil and biomass) in Southwest China. This is because insects can easily accumulate heavy metals in their body, due to their high surface area to volume ratio and ingesting food source that may already have been contaminated by heavy metal substances, which will then result in physiological toxicity and ecological stress. They found out that 99.4% of the total mercury pools from the ecosystem was accumulated in layers of soil. High pools of mercury in soil can endanger the atmospheric activity as more mercury can be released during potential wildfires. It is reported that a female cicada usually has a higher mercury level than the males due to having a smaller body mass and more concentrated mercury concentrations, but the mercury concentrations in both of the sexes in this research was significantly similar as there were no significant differences in body mass. They also argued that there are higher mercury levels in cicada (49±38 ng/g) as compared to longicorn (7±5 ng/g), due to the special life cycle of cicada; the larvae of cicadas can live for four to five years underground before they undergo their last molting and rely on sucking plant roots for survival, which may contain a relatively higher mercury levels than in wood or bark of the tree. Nevertheless, mercury levels recorded from dung beetles in this experiment were a lot times higher than both cicada and longicorn; 40 and 283 times higher, respectively.

=== Lead bio-accumulation ===
The forest ecosystem is in danger of the elevating levels of lead (Pb) in soils and biomass as lead can be deposited atmospherically. The sources of elevating levels of lead in terrestrial environments are known to come from both natural and anthropogenic activities, such as the use and production of lead batteries, gasoline combustion from motor vehicles, coal combustion, sintering and smelting of minerals. This can pose ecological threat to insects, the habitat that they are living in and their foraging habits since terrestrial forests are identified as large sinks of atmospheric lead. Similar to the mercury level in soil study, cicada larvae are collected and sampled within Tieshanping Forest Park and a protected area near Chongqing City, Southwest China to measure the bio-accumulation of lead concentration as they can live underground from four to up to five years long before appearing above ground and undergo their last stage of molting. The next life-cycle stage will require them to feed on sap of plants. It is worth noting that Chongqing is one of the important industrial areas in Southwest China which uses a large amount of fossil fuels. This may contribute to the higher levels of lead in the area and contaminate the surrounding environment. The average concentration of lead in the atmosphere was recorded at 149 ng/m^{3} in 2012. The research showed that the lead concentration in the cicadas were lower than the known harmful level for invertebrates. The female cicadas are reported to have higher concentrations of lead than males, similar to the dung beetles in the study. However, it is known that cicada larvae have the ability to detoxify harmful substances, such as the removal of degenerated cells, producing metal-containing vesicles into the digestive tract for removal and exocytosis. This allows them to be more resilient to lead pollution in soil which increases their chance of survival. The research however, justified that there are concerning elevated levels of lead in dung beetles, which can negatively affect predators in food chains. This case is also known as biomagnification, which occurs when toxicity levels in a tolerant organism's tissue increase successively in a food chain.

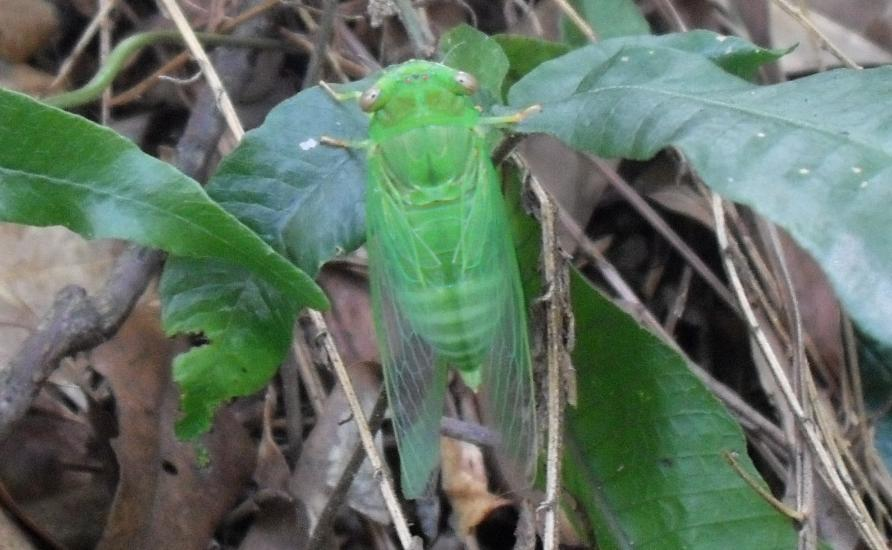
Chremistica ochracea with bright green body and transparent or hyaline wings with green outline sitting on leaves. The triangular head can be seen clearly from this angle.

== See also ==
In a paper, Chremistica ochracea is recognised under the pontianaka group, with some other genus Chremistica species.

- Auchenorrhyncha
- Biomagnification
- Carl Linnaeus
- Carl Stål
- Cicada
- Exuviae
- Francis Walker
- Human impact on the environment
- Imago
- James John Walker
- List of genus Chremistica species
- List of Cicadidae genera
- Noise pollution
- Tymbal
