= Nancy A. Moran =

American biologist

- Born: December 21, 1954 (age 71); Dallas, Texas
- Education: Ph.D.
- Alma mater: University of Michigan
- Scientific career
- Fields: Evolutionary biology
- Workplaces: University of Arizona (1986-2010); Yale University (2010-2013); University of Texas, Austin (2013-Present)
- Website: web.biosci.utexas.edu/moran/

Nancy A. Moran (born December 21, 1954, Dallas, Texas) is an American evolutionary biologist and entomologist, University of Texas Leslie Surginer Endowed Professor, and co-founder of the Yale Microbial Diversity Institute. Since 2005, she has been a member of the United States National Academy of Sciences. Her seminal research has focused on the pea aphid, Acyrthosiphon pisum and its bacterial symbionts including Buchnera (bacterium). In 2013, she returned to the University of Texas at Austin, where she continues to conduct research on bacterial symbionts in aphids, bees, and other insect species. She has also expanded the scale of her research to bacterial evolution as a whole. She believes that a good understanding of genetic drift and random chance could prevent misunderstandings surrounding evolution. Her current research goal focuses on complexity in life-histories and symbiosis between hosts and microbes, including the microbiota of insects.

== Early life ==
Moran is one of eight children of Robert Moran, who ran a drive-in movie theater. As a child, Moran liked to collect insects in jars. Yet as youth she never envisioned becoming a scientist and did not even find her biology class interesting. Moran began her undergraduate studies at the University of Texas in 1972 in an honors program known as Plan II. She started out as an art major, and later switched to philosophy. For an elective requirement she took an introduction to biology course. From this, she became interested in biology. During her senior year at college while taking a class on animal behavior with Nancy Burley as a TA (who later studied bird behavior), she undertook an honors project on mate choice in pigeons.

== Education and career ==
In 1976, Moran graduated from the University of Texas with a B.A. in Biology in 1976. She received her Ph.D. in zoology in 1982 from the University of Michigan studying with W.D. Hamilton and Richard D. Alexander. In 1984, she was a fellow at the National Academy of Sciences in the Institute of Entomology in Czechoslovakia. She completed her postdoctoral fellowship at Northern Arizona University from 1984-1986. She rose to the rank of Regents' Professor at the University of Arizona from 1986-2010, was the William H. Fleming Professor at Yale University from 2010-2013, and subsequently moved to the University of Texas where she is now the Leslie Surginer Endowed Professor and Warren J. and Viola Mae Raymer Chair.

== Research ==
=== Aphids ===
Early in Moran's career she studied an aphid species local to Arizona, Melaphis rhois, which has a peculiar life cycle migrating to moss from a complex gall on sumac. While Moran's initial hypothesis was that this was a complex adaptation to changing seasons, it turned out that it was an ancient adaptation dating back over 50 million years. This work attracted the attention of Paul Baumann at the University of California at Davis, an expert in microbial diversity with an interest in aphid microbial diversity culminating in a 15-year collaboration on the mutualistic relationship between aphids and their symbionts.

=== Buchnera aphidicola and the genomic evolution of other symbiotic bacteria ===
Initially, Moran and Baumman used 16S ribosomal RNA sequencing to demonstrate that Buchnera aphidicola bacteria and their aphid hosts co-evolve, or evolve together, due to their long-term symbiotic relationship. Subsequently, they demonstrated this coevolution of symbionts in mealybugs.

As new technologies emerged and improved, Moran transitioned to examining the genomic evolution of symbiotic bacteria. By comparing Buchnera, an obligately host-associated bacteria, with closely related free-living bacteria, she demonstrated that Buchnera tends to accumulate nonsynonymous, silent mutations, more rapidly, increasing the AT-content of the genome with an accelerated rate of evolution. In other words, these obligately host-associated bacteria accumulate mutations. They also accumulate deleterious mutations through Muller's Ratchet, such that genome reduction reflects an evolutionary phenomenon known as genetic drift. Her research continued to involve sequencing genes of symbionts through whole genome sequencing and comparing them to free-living relatives using comparative genomics.

=== Drosophila gut microbiomes ===
Moran's research on Drosophila gut microbiomes demonstrated that, unlike other species, Drosophila's microbiome content was ingested with food and varied widely between individuals and populations. Her research provides information on this model organism and the bacteria it possesses which affects research done with Drosophila. The research demonstrated that gut microbiota in Drosophila used as model organisms is more representative of the food they eat as opposed to the wild-type Drosophila gut microbiota. The conclusion of the research stressed the importance of including fieldwork into microbiota research to better understand the environment-driven gut microbiota makeup.

=== Honey bee gut microbiomes ===
Moran is currently researching honey bees and their interaction with gut microbiota. Her research found that microbiota interact with host metabolism and hormone signaling. This research showed that microbiota in social bees degrade plant polymers that the organisms consumes in their diet. The research compared the bee's microbiome to other species and determined it can model host-microbiota interactions due to similarities such as types of bacteria. Her work with eusocial corbiculate bees demonstrates that different phylogenies within this class of bees share a common ancestor for their gut microbiota independent of geography or sympatry. Corbiculate bees include honey bees, bumble bees, and stingless bees. She completed research on the symbiotic relationship between host insects and their gut microbiota and her research team has found that the honey bee's exposure to antibiotics disrupts the microbiota, which regulates weight and hormone signaling, and increases mortality rates. The data collected demonstrates the bee's susceptibility to fatal pathogens after antibiotic exposure.

== Notable awards and honors ==
- 1997 MacArthur Fellows Program
- 2004 Member of the National Academy of Sciences
- 2006 Member of the American Academy of Arts and Sciences
- 2007 Fellow of the American Association for the Advancement of Science
- 2008 University of Arizona Alumni Association Extraordinary Faculty Award
- 2010 International Prize for Biology, Japanese Society for the Promotion of Science
- 2014 International Society for Microbial Ecology James Tiedje Award for outstanding lifetime contribution to [microbial ecology]
- 2016 Society for Molecular Biology and Evolution's Lifetime Contribution Award
- 2017 Molecular Ecology Prize
- 2023 Selman A. Waksman Award in Microbiology

== Taxonomy ==
In 2011, one of Moran's trainees, John McCutcheon, named an endosymbiont in the mealy bug system Moranella endobia, in recognition of Moran's contributions to the field.

== Works ==
- Moran, N. A.; Degnan, P. H.; Santos, S. R.; Dunbar, H. E.; Ochman, H. (2005). "Inaugural Article: The players in a mutualistic symbiosis: Insects, bacteria, viruses, and virulence genes". Proceedings of the National Academy of Sciences. 102 (47): 16919–16926. doi:10.1073/pnas.0507029102. PMC 1287993. PMID 16195380.
- Hamilton, W. D., Henderson, P. A. & Moran, N. A. (1980) Natural Selection and Social Behavior: Recent Research and New Theory, eds. Alexander, R. D. & Tinkle, D. W. (Chiron Press, New York), pp. 363–382.
- Moran, N. A. (1989). "A 48-Million-Year-Old Aphid--Host Plant Association and Complex Life Cycle: Biogeographic Evidence". Science. 245 (4914): 173–175. Bibcode:1989Sci...245..173M. doi:10.1126/science.245.4914.173. PMID 17787877. S2CID 2710577.
- Munson, M. A.; Baumann, P.; Clark, M. A.; Baumann, L.; Moran, N. A.; Voegtlin, D. J.; Campbell, B. C. (1991). "Evidence for the establishment of aphid-eubacterium endosymbiosis in an ancestor of four aphid families". Journal of Bacteriology. 173 (20): 6321–6324. doi:10.1128/jb.173.20.6321-6324.1991. PMC 208962. PMID 1917864.
- Moran, N. A. (1996). "Accelerated evolution and Muller's rachet in endosymbiotic bacteria". Proceedings of the National Academy of Sciences of the United States of America. 93 (7): 2873–2878. Bibcode:1996PNAS...93.2873M. doi:10.1073/pnas.93.7.2873. PMC 39726. PMID 8610134.
- Oliver, K. M.; Russell, J. A.; Moran, N. A.; Hunter, M. S. (2003). "Facultative bacterial symbionts in aphids confer resistance to parasitic wasps". Proceedings of the National Academy of Sciences. 100 (4): 1803–1807. Bibcode:2003PNAS..100.1803O. doi:10.1073/pnas.0335320100. PMC 149914. PMID 12563031.
- Oliver, K. M.; Moran, N. A.; Hunter, M. S. (2005). "Variation in resistance to parasitism in aphids is due to symbionts not host genotype". Proceedings of the National Academy of Sciences. 102 (36): 12795–12800. Bibcode:2005PNAS..10212795O. doi:10.1073/pnas.0506131102. PMC 1200300. PMID 16120675.
- Dale, C.; Plague, G. R.; Wang, B.; Ochman, H.; Moran, N. A. (2002). "Type III secretion systems and the evolution of mutualistic endosymbiosis". Proceedings of the National Academy of Sciences. 99 (19): 12397–12402. Bibcode:2002PNAS...9912397D. doi:10.1073/pnas.182213299. PMC 129456. PMID 12213957.
- Daubin, V.; Moran, N. A.; Ochman, H. (2003). "Phylogenetics and the Cohesion of Bacterial Genomes". Science. 301 (5634): 829–832. Bibcode:2003Sci...301..829D. doi:10.1126/science.1086568. PMID 12907801. S2CID 11268678.

== Personal life ==
Moran is married to Howard Ochman, a microbiologist, molecular genetist, and evolutionary biologist. She has one daughter. She acknowledges that the MacArthur genius award was a blessing, allowing her to reduce her teaching load to have more time for her research and her daughter.
