= Transposon sequencing =

Transposon insertion sequencing (Tn-seq) combines transposon insertional mutagenesis with massively parallel sequencing (MPS) of the transposon insertion sites to identify genes contributing to a function of interest in bacteria. The method was originally established by concurrent work in four laboratories under the acronyms HITS, INSeq, TraDIS, and Tn-Seq. Numerous variations have been subsequently developed and applied to diverse biological systems. Collectively, the methods are often termed Tn-Seq as they all involve monitoring the fitness of transposon insertion mutants via DNA sequencing approaches.

Transposons are highly regulated, discrete DNA segments that can relocate within the genome. They are universal and are found in Eubacteria, Archaea, and Eukarya, including humans. Transposons have a large influence on gene expression and can be used to determine gene function. In fact, when a transposon inserts itself in a gene, the gene's function will be disrupted. Because of that property, transposons have been manipulated for use in insertional mutagenesis. The development of microbial genome sequencing was a major advance for the use of transposon mutagenesis. The function affected by a transposon insertion could be linked to the disrupted gene by sequencing the genome to locate the transposon insertion site. Massively parallel sequencing allows simultaneous sequencing of transposon insertion sites in large mixtures of different mutants. Therefore, genome-wide analysis is feasible if transposons are positioned throughout the genome in a mutant collection.

Transposon sequencing requires the creation of a transposon insertion library, which will contain a group of mutants that collectively have transposon insertions in all non-essential genes. The library is grown under an experimental condition of interest. Mutants with transposons inserted in genes required for growth under the test condition will diminish in frequency from the population. To identify mutants being lost, genomic sequences adjacent to the transposon ends are amplified by PCR and sequenced by MPS to determine the location and abundance of each insertion mutation. The importance of each gene for growth under the test condition is determined by comparing the abundance of each mutant before and after growth under the condition being examined. Tn-seq is useful for both the study of a single gene's fitness as well as gene interactions

Signature–tagged mutagenesis (STM) is an older technique that also involves pooling transposon insertion mutants to determine the importance of the disrupted genes under selective growth conditions. High-throughput versions of STM use genomic microarrays, which are less accurate and have a lower dynamic range than massively-parallel sequencing. With the invention of next generation sequencing, genomic data became increasingly available. However, despite the increase in genomic data, our knowledge of gene function remains the limiting factor in our understanding of the role genes play. Therefore, a need for a high throughput approach to study genotype–phenotype relationships like Tn-seq was necessary.

== Methodology ==
Transposon sequencing begins by transducing bacterial populations with transposable elements using bacteriophages. Tn-seq uses the Himar I Mariner transposon, a common and stable transposon. After transduction, the DNA is cleaved and the inserted sequence amplified through PCR. The recognition sites for MmeI, a type IIS restriction endonuclease, can be introduced by a single nucleotide change in the terminal repeats of the Mariner transposon. It is located 4 base pairs before the end of the terminal repeat.

MmeI makes a 2 base pair staggered cut 20 bases downstream of the MmeI recognition site.

When MmeI digests DNA from a library of transposon insertion mutants, fragmented DNA including the left and right transposon and 16 base pair of surrounding genomic DNA is produced. The 16 base pair fragment is enough to determine the location of the transposon insertion in the bacterial genome. The ligation of the adaptor (sequence used to bind to the flow cell) is facilitated by the 2 base overhang. A primer specific to the adaptor and a primer specific to the transposon are used to amplify the sequence via PCR. The 120 base pair product is then isolated using agarose gel or PAGE purification. Massively parallel sequencing is then used to determine the sequences of the flanking 16 base pairs.

Gene function is inferred after looking at the effects of the insertion on gene function under certain conditions.

== Advantages and disadvantages ==
Unlike high-throughput insertion track by deep sequencing (HITS) and transposon-directed insertion site sequencing (TraDIS), Tn-seq is specific to the Himar I Mariner transposon, and cannot be applied to other transposons or insertional elements. However, the protocol for Tn-seq is less time intensive. HITS and TraDIS use a DNA shearing technique that produce a range of PCR product sizes that could cause shorter DNA templates being preferentially amplified over longer templates. Tn-seq produces a product that is uniform in size, therefore reducing the possibility of PCR bias.

Tn-seq can be used to identify both the fitness of single genes and to map gene interactions in microorganisms. Existing methods for these types of study are dependent on preexisting genomic microarrays or gene knockout arrays, whereas Tn-seq is not. Tn-seq's utilization of massively parallel sequencing makes this technique easily reproducible, sensitive, and robust.

== Applications ==
Tn-seq has proven to be a useful technique for identifying new gene functions. The highly sensitive nature of Tn-seq can be used to determine phenotype-genotype relationships that may have been deemed insignificant by less sensitive methods. Tn-seq identified essential genes and pathways that are important for the utilization of cholesterol in Mycobacterium tuberculosis.

Tn-seq has been used to study higher order genome organization using gene interactions. Genes function as a highly linked network. Therefore, in order to study a gene's impact on phenotype, gene interactions must also be considered. Tn-seq was used to determine interactions between five query genes and the rest of the genome in Streptococcus pneumoniae, which revealed both positive and negative epistasis.

Tn-seq used in combination with RNA-seq can be utilized to examine the role of non-coding DNA regions.
