= FIA (disambiguation) =

The FIA is the Fédération Internationale de l'Automobile (English: International Automobile Federation), the world's governing body for all forms of motor sport where four or more wheels are used.

Fia or FIA may also refer to:

== People ==
- Fia Backström (born 1970), Swedish artist
- Albert Fia (1915–2004), Canadian engineer
- Maʻafu Fia (born 1989), Tongan-born New Zealand rugby union player

== Organizations ==
- Federal Investigation Agency, the chief investigative body of the Government of Pakistan
- Federated Ironworkers' Association of Australia
- Fellow of the Institute of Actuaries, member of a professional association in the United Kingdom
- FIA Card Services, formerly MBNA Corporation
- Fire Industry Association, trade association in the United Kingdom
- Fiscal Information Agency, government agency in Taiwan
- Friends in Action, American Christian organization
- Future Imagery Architecture, program of the United States National Reconnaissance Office
- Futures Industry Association, trade association in the United States
- International Federation of Actors (Federation Internationale des Acteurs), global union federation
- Free Iraqi Army
- Fusion Industry Association, independent trade association for the international nuclear fusion industry

== Other uses ==
- Farnborough International Airshow, in England
- Feline infectious anemia, disease found in felines
- FIA hair system, system for classifying human hair types
- Fixed Income Annuity
- Flow injection analysis, a form of chemical analysis
- Freund's incomplete adjuvant, stimulant of the immune system
- Nobiin language (ISO 639-3 code fia)
