= Clyde A. Hutchison III =

American biochemist and microbiologist (1938–2025)

- Born: November 26, 1938; New York City, U.S.
- Died: September 27, 2025 (aged 86); La Jolla, California, U.S.
- Education: Yale University
- Alma mater: California Institute of Technology
- Known for: Research on site-directed mutagenesis and synthetic biology
- Scientific career
- Fields: Biochemistry, microbiology
- Workplaces: University of North Carolina at Chapel Hill, J. Craig Venter Institute

Clyde A. Hutchison III (November 26, 1938 – September 27, 2025) was an American biochemist and microbiologist notable for his research on site-directed mutagenesis and synthetic biology. He was professor emeritus of Microbiology and Immunology at the University of North Carolina at Chapel Hill, distinguished professor at the J Craig Venter Institute, a member of the National Academy of Sciences, and a fellow of the American Academy of Arts and Sciences.

== Early research ==
Born at New York City in 1938, Hutchison graduated from Yale University in 1960, with a B.S. degree in physics. He studied for his PhD at Caltech, working on the bacteriophage ΦX174. While at Caltech he began a long-term collaboration with Marshall Edgell. In 1968 he moved to UNC-Chapel Hill. Hutchison and Edgell used restriction enzymes for the analysis of ΦX174 and mammalian DNA.

Hutchison participated in the determination of the first complete sequence of a DNA molecule (ΦX174) when he spent a year sabbatical at the Frederick Sanger's laboratory in 1975/1976.

== Site-directed mutagenesis ==
In 1971, Clyde Hutchison and Marshall Edgell showed that it is possible to produce mutants with small fragments of bacteriophage ΦX174 and restriction nucleases. Hutchison later collaborated with Michael Smith and developed a more general method of site-directed mutagenesis using a mutant oligonucleotide primer and DNA polymerase. Smith and Hutchison used a 12-nucleotide oligomer with a centrally positioned single mismatched nucleotide as primer, a circular single-stranded ΦX174 DNA as template, and E. coli DNA polymerase I in which the 5'-exonuclease had been inactivated by subtilisin. The polymerization with the primer annealed to the template generated a double-stranded DNA product that contained a mutation and could be converted to a closed circular duplex by enzymatic ligation. Transfection of E. coli with this molecule produced a mixed population of wild-type and mutated phage DNA. For his part in the development of this process, Michael Smith later shared the Nobel Prize in Chemistry in 1993 with Kary B. Mullis, who invented polymerase chain reaction.

Hutchison later developed methods for "complete mutagenesis" in which each residue in a protein can be individually altered.

== Synthetic biology ==
In 1990 Hutchison began work on Mycoplasma genitalium, which has the smallest known genome that can constitute a cell. It led to a collaboration with The Institute for Genomic Research (TIGR) to sequence the entire genome of the organism in 1995. In 1996 Hutchison spent a sabbatical year at TIGR; there he discussed with Hamilton Smith and Craig Venter the idea of a minimum cell - cell with the minimal set of genes required for survival. They speculated that they may need to synthesize the genome to test them in recipient cell, thereby creating a synthetic cell.

In 2003 Hutchison began a collaboration with Hamilton Smith on the assembly of a synthetic minimal cellular genome, and successfully synthesized the small genome (5386 base pairs) of the bacteriophage ΦX174. The M. genitalium genome however is over 100 times larger than that of ΦX174. In 2007, a chemically synthesized genome of 582,970 base pairs based on M. genitalium, intended for the creation of an organism christened Mycoplasma laboratorium, was successfully assembled. M. genitalium however is slow-growing and attempts at transplanting its genome to another species became protracted and proved unsuccessful. The synthetic-cell team however showed that it is possible to transplant the natural genome of Mycoplasma mycoides, whose genome is twice the size of M. genitalium, into a related species Mycoplasma capricolum. The team therefore decided to switch to the faster-growing M. mycoides as the donor species. In March 2010, a synthesized M. mycoides genome was successfully transplanted into M. capricolum. The resulting organism was called "Synthia" by the popular press. In 2016, the team revealed a further pared-down version of the organism with 473 genes, 149 of which whose functions are completely unknown.

Hutchison worked on creating the minimal cell. New versions of the synthetic genome with genes removed were transplanted into recipient cells, and the resultant cells' growth rates and their colony size were monitored. Other more complex bacteria such as cyanobacteria were also being assessed for the feasibility of genome transplantation.
