= Anaeroplasmataceae =

Scientific classification
- Domain: Bacteria
- Kingdom: Bacillati
- Phylum: Mycoplasmatota
- Class: Mollicutes
- Order: Anaeroplasmatales; Robinson & Freundt 1987
- Family: Anaeroplasmataceae; Robinson & Freundt 1987

Genera
- Anaeroplasma; Asteroleplasma; "Ca. Avacholeplasma"; "Ca. Pelethenecus"

Family of bacteria

Anaeroplasmatales is an order of mollicute bacteria which are generally found in the rumens of cattle and sheep. The only family in the order is the family Anaeroplasmataceae.

== Description ==
Members of the order Anaeroplasmatales can appear as different shapes at different times in their lifecycles. Cells which are 16–18 hours old tend to be spherical. When the cells are older, they can take on various shapes. Anaeroplasmatales are not motile. Anaeroplasmatales cannot grow in the presence of oxygen. They do grow at a temperature of 37 °C on microbiological media, where they form irregular-shaped colonies with a "fried-egg" appearance, similar to other mycoplasmas. Anaeroplasmatales are negative by Gram stain.

== History ==
The order Anaeroplasmatales was created in 1987 to encompass the family Anaeroplasmataceae which itself was created to hold the anaerobic mycoplasmas Anaeroplasma and Asteroleplasma.

== Phylogeny ==
The currently accepted taxonomy is based on the List of Prokaryotic names with Standing in Nomenclature (LPSN) and National Center for Biotechnology Information (NCBI)

16S rRNA based LTP_10_2024

- - Anaeroplasmataceae
    Anaeroplasma

120 marker proteins based GTDB 09-RS220

- - Anaeroplasmataceae
    - "Ca. Pelethenecus" Gilroy et al. 2021
    - Anaeroplasma Robinson, Allison & Hartman 1975 [incl. "Ca. Avacholeplasma" Gilroy et al. 2021]

== See also ==
- List of bacterial orders
- List of bacteria genera
