= Carsonella ruddii =

Candidatus Carsonella ruddii

Scientific classification (Candidatus)
- Domain: Bacteria
- Phylum: Pseudomonadota
- Class: Gammaproteobacteria
- Order: incertae sedis
- Genus: Candidatus Carsonella
- Species: Ca. C. ruddii

Binomial name
- Candidatus Carsonella ruddii Thao et al. 2000

Species of bacterium

"Candidatus Carsonella ruddii" is an obligate endosymbiotic Gammaproteobacterium with one of the smallest genomes of any characterised bacteria.

This is the first, and as of February 2022 the only species described from the genus Candidatus Carsonella, named after Rachel Carson.

== Endosymbiosis ==
The species is an endosymbiont that is present in all species of phloem sap-feeding insects known as psyllids. The endosymbionts occurs in a specialised structure known as the bacteriome.

Ca. C. ruddii is not completely parasitic in its relationship with its host insect; it supplies the host with some essential amino acids. It is therefore probably in the evolutionary process of becoming an organelle, similar to the mitochondria of eukaryotic cells that also evolved from an endosymbiont.

== Genome ==
In 2006 the genome of Ca. C. ruddii strain Pv (Carsonella-Pv) of the hackberry petiole gall psyllid, Pachypsylla venusta, was sequenced at RIKEN in Japan and the University of Arizona. It was shown that the genome consists of a circular chromosome of 159,662 base pairs and that it has a high coding density (97%) with many overlapping genes and reduced gene length. The number of predicted genes was 182, also the lowest on record (NCBI-Genome). In comparison, Mycoplasma genitalium, which has the smallest genome of any free-living organism, has a genome of 521 genes. Numerous genes considered essential for life seem to be missing, suggesting that the species may have achieved organelle-like status.

At the time of its sequencing, Ca. C. ruddii was thought to have the smallest genome of any characterized bacterial species. Ca. Nasuia deltocephalinicola is now considered to have the known smallest bacterial genome (112kb).

Ca. C. ruddii and related species appear to be actively undergoing gene loss.
