= Emmy Klieneberger-Nobel =

German Jewish microbiologist

Emmy Klieneberger-Nobel (February 15, 1892 – September 11, 1985) was a German Jewish microbiologist and a founder of mycoplasma bacterial research. She performed most of her research at the Lister Institute in London, England, after having been expelled from Germany by the Nazis.

== Education and early life ==
Klieneberger-Nobel was born on February 15, 1892, in Frankfurt, Germany, to Sophie née Hamburger, a homemaker, and Abraham Adolph Klieneberger, a successful wine merchant. She was the youngest of four siblings, with two older brothers and a sister. Although the family was Jewish, her parents resigned from the Jewish community and had some of their children baptized, seeking assimilation into German society.

Klieneberger-Nobel attended a teacher's training college and received her teaching certificate in 1911. Afterwards, she began studying botany, zoology, mathematics, and physics at the University of Göttingen. In 1914 she returned to her home city of Frankfurt and continued her studies at the newly founded University of Frankfurt. She received her Ph.D. in botany in 1917, under Professor Martin Möbius.

Afterwards, she again studied mathematics in Göttingen for one semester, and after her return to Frankfurt in 1918 completed the state examination for teaching in the upper secondary school. After a one-year trainee-ship at schools in Frankfurt, she passed the pedagogical exam in November 1919. She then worked for three years from 1919 to 1922 teaching physics, chemistry, biology, and arithmetic at a private girls' school in Dresden.

== Career ==
=== Germany ===
In 1922, Klieneberger-Nobel was hired as a bacteriologist at the Hygiene Institute of the University of Frankfurt. She trained under Professor Max Neisser and became a member of the German Society for Hygiene and Bacteriology, publishing scientific journal articles on a wide variety of topics in bacteriology. In 1930, she became the first female lecturer at the University of Frankfurt when she qualified as a lecturer in the Medical Faculty. However, her career was cut short by the rise of the Nazi Party. In September 1933, due to her Jewish descent, she was stripped of teaching authority on the basis of the Law for the Restoration of the Professional Civil Service. Klieneberger-Nobel received a fellowship from the American Association of University Women in 1934 after being dismissed from her position in Germany, and she used the funds to move to England.

=== England ===
Upon relocating to England, Klieneberger-Nobel received a position as a researcher at the Lister Institute of Preventive Medicine in London, where she would remain for the rest of her career. Over the next three decades, she published about 80 scientific publications, in particular on the morphology and morphogenesis of bacteria.

Her work at the Lister Institute focused on mycoplasma, a type of microorganism that was poorly understood at the time. During her career, Klieneberger-Nobel contributed significantly to mycoplasma research and her work provided the foundation for later research into how these microorganisms cause infectious disease. In 1934, she was the first to establish the differences between mycoplasmas and other bacteria species. She then developed a special nutrient agar blend and culturing technique that allowed organisms causing bronchopneumonia in rats and mice to be grown in the laboratory for the first time. She later used this technique to isolate and identify several pathogenic species of mycoplasma, including M. arthritides and M. pneumoniae.

She was awarded the Jenner Memorial Scholarship from the Lister Institute in 1935.

In addition, in 1935 she discovered and cultured unusual strains of bacteria that lacked a cell wall, naming these strains "L-form bacteria" after the Lister Institute where she was working. These special cell-wall-free forms of some bacterial species, which arise under certain culture conditions, have been implicated in antibiotic resistant infections.

During World War II, limited resources caused Klieneberger-Nobel to turn her attention to collecting micrographs of important species of bacteria, including Myxobacterium, Streptomyces, and Bacillus species. The images were taken using a Zeiss microscope and Leica plate camera that she purchased during a return visit to Germany in 1934. Many were subsequently included in her book “Focus on Bacteria”, an illustrated guide published in 1965.

In 1962, shortly before she retired, Klieneberger-Nobel published the first book devoted to mycoplasmas, entitled "Pleuropneumonia-like organisms (PPLO) Mycoplasmataceae". Around the same time, the importance of mycoplasmas as pathogens in humans, animals, and plants was recognized. The increasing relevance of Klieneberg-Nobel's fundamental work on their morphology and growth cemented her role as one of the founders of mycoplasma microbiology.

Klieneberg-Nobel remained at the Lister Institute until her retirement in 1962, interrupted only by a brief work at the Institute of Hygiene of the City of Zurich in 1947.

== Personal life ==
After seeking refuge in England, Klieneberger-Nobel made several attempts to rescue her mother and sister from Nazi Germany, including a final visit to Germany in 1938. She was unsuccessful and both eventually died in 1941. Her brother Carl Klieneberger took his own life in September 1938 due to increasing anti-Semitic persecution, shortly before his license to practice medicine was due to be withdrawn. Later, Klieneberger-Nobel was able to provide help to several of her nieces and nephews who escaped to England.

In 1943 she met the pediatrician Professor Edmund Nobel. Also Jewish, he had been born in Hungary and graduated in 1910 from the University of Vienna. When the Nazis invaded Austria in 1938 he was Chief Physician at the Mautner Makhof Children's Hospital in Vienna. Edmund Nobel was expelled from his post and eventually came to England.

The two married on 28 January 1944 with an informal lunch attended by Professor Albert Neuberger, also a refugee from Germany. Edmund died from a heart complaint just two years later in 1946, at the age of 62. They had no children.

After retiring from the Lister Institute, Klieneberger-Nobel made several journeys abroad, including trips to Europe, the US, Australia, and to Colombia, where one of her nieces was living.

In 1977, Klieneberger-Nobel published her autobiography in German. The English translation under the title “Memoirs” appeared in 1980.

Klieneberg-Nobel died on September 11, 1985, at the age of 93.

== Notable publications ==
- Pleuropneumonia-like organisms (PPLO) Mycoplasmataceae. London and New York 1962
- Focus on Bacteria. Academic Press, London 1965
- Pioneering achievements for medical microbiology. Memoirs. Fischer, Stuttgart / New York, NY 1977, ISBN 3-437-10497-7 ; English edition: Memoirs. Translated by Francis A. Blake. Academic Press, London 1980, ISBN 0-12-414850-6 (autobiography).

== Honors and awards ==
In 1976, she became the first honorary life member of the newly founded International Organization for Mycoplasmology (IOM).

In 1980, the IOM instituted the biennial “Emmy Klieneberger-Nobel Award” for outstanding achievement in research in the field of mycoplasmology.

On her 75th birthday in 1967, she was made an honorary member of the Robert Koch Institute in Berlin.

In 1980, the Robert Koch Medal was bestowed on her by the President of the then Federal Republic of Germany, Karl Carstens, in the city of Bonn

== See also ==
- The International Organization for Mycoplasmology
- Emmy Klieneberger-Nobel: Memoirs (in English) Academic Press Inc (London) Ltd, 1980, ISBN 0-12-414850-6
