= The Youth Cafe =

African youth organization

The Youth Café is a not-for profit pan-African youth organization that was founded in 2012 and works with young people in Africa and around the world to foster community resilience, propose innovative solutions, drive social progress, enable youth empowerment and inspire political change. The Youth Café is headquartered at Kitisuru Gardens, in Nairobi, Kenya.

The Youth Café's work is based on its current strategy, its Youth Manifesto (they facilitated its creation in Kenya during the 2017 general elections and required that the next president needed a youth manifesto) and the African Union Youth Charter (a political and legal document which serves as the strategic framework that gives direction for youth empowerment and development at continental, regional and national levels). These guiding documents looks at today's youth bulge as an opportunity for development and economic growth. This drives their work for implementing multidisciplinary and multi-perspective projects including Peace and Security, Preventing Violent Extremism; Governance and Political Inclusion (Remittances and Accountability); Culture, Arts, and Sports; Education and Skills; Business, Job Creation and Entrepreneurship; Universal Health Coverage; Environmental Preservation and Climate Change. Their projects have reached many youths. In addition to their stand-alone programs, they maintain long-standing collaborations with partners worldwide. Their work is regularly cited by media and government bodies, and used by firms, investors, philanthropic leaders and policymakers such as Participedia, UNESCO, Climate Links, Apolitcal, Global Donor Platform, Ethelo, and UNODC. They also produce Youth Cafe, a youth TV program on KTN that host debates on matters and issues pertaining the youth.

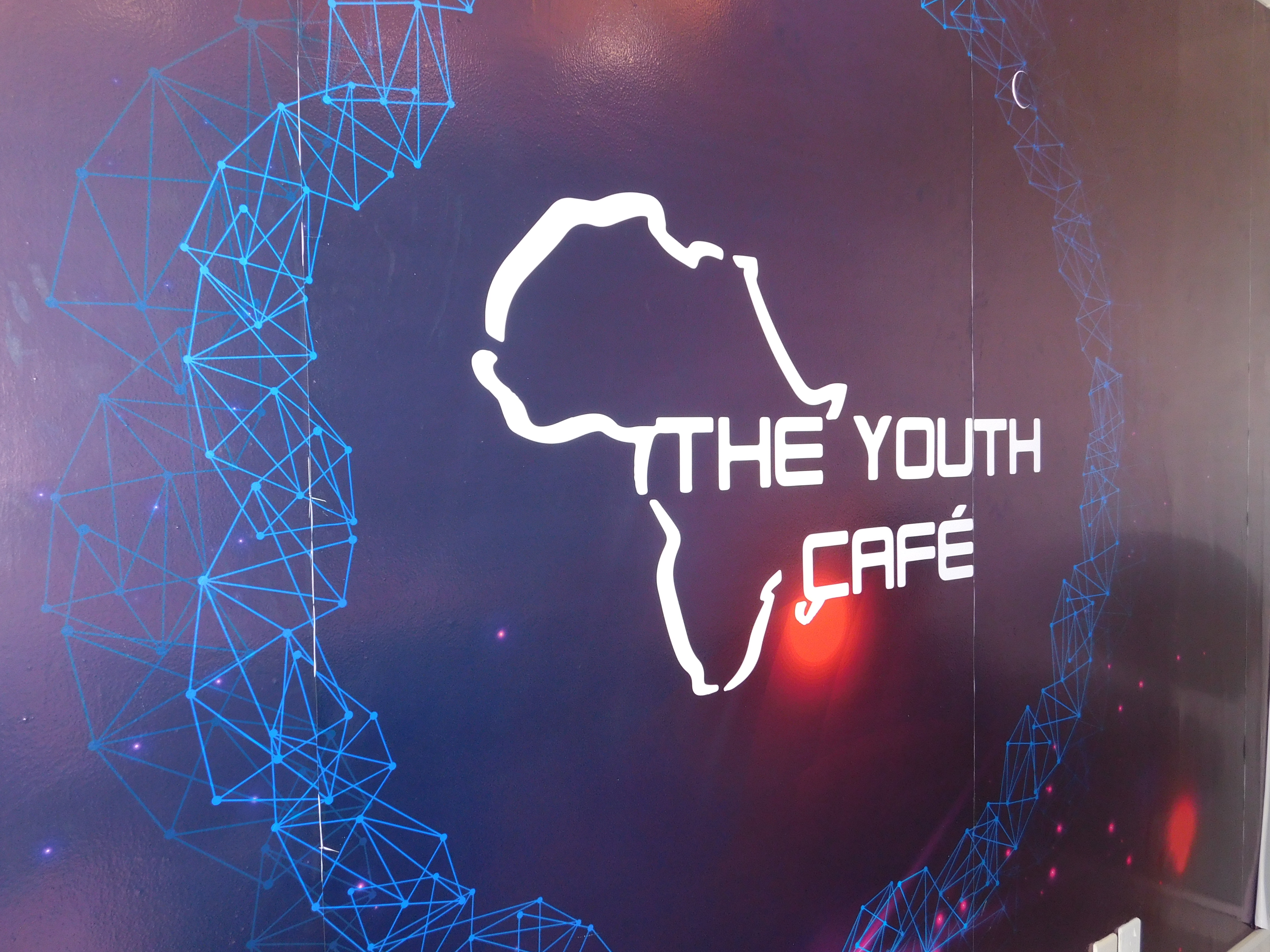
Empowering Youth In Africa

== Formal Launch Of The Youth Cafe ==
The Youth Cafe was launched in 2012 by a group of motivated young people who were selected to give input to the United Nations High Level Panel of Eminent Persons on Post 2015 Agenda. Together, they devised the model that The Youth Cafe utilizes today. This partnership is a unique collaboration in the field of international development. Bolstered by grassroots knowledge, the organization is dedicated to bringing hope to young people.

== Overview ==
75% of the African population is below the age of 35. For Africa to develop, focus, recognition and support must be on youths.

Youths can be a positive force for development and their potential can be utilized and developed by quality education and skills improvement; employment opportunities; empowerment and entrepreneurship; good governance; health and well-being. Without strategic investments in the areas above, then the demographic dividend of Africa will not be achieved. All these rights are guaranteed in the Kenyan Constitution in the Bill of Rights. Article 55 of the Kenyan Constitution is the “youth section”, which focuses on access to relevant education and training, politics in relations to youths, employment and protection. Article 43 of the Kenyan Constitution provides for among others, the right to healthcare (including reproductive health), sanitation and education. Additionally, the National Youth Policy, East African Community youth policy, the African Youth Charter and international provisions under the United Nations, guarantees the rights of youths. More often than not, youths do not enjoy these rights.

This among others was the gap The Youth Café was initiated to fill.

=== The Youth Café's Vision ===
Their aim is to advance youth-led approaches toward achieving sustainable development, social equity, innovative solutions, community resilience, and transformative change.”

=== The Youth Café's Mission ===
The Youth Café strives to enrich the lives of young people by modelling and advancing youth-led and rights-based approaches to foster young people’s civic efficacy, community resilience, sustainable development, an equitable society, as well as proposing innovative solutions, driving social progress, and inspiring transformative change by utilizing innovative research, policy, and advocacy actions.

== The Youth Cafe's Theory of Change ==
A Pathway For Action, Sustainability, Results, Learning, and Adaptation.

The Youth Cafe has a theory of change, that uses techniques which match their tolerance for "planning" and "execution". They've worked to develop an outcome map, a visual diagram that depicts relationships between their strategies and intended results. The result includes both short- and longer-term outcomes and also reflects changes at different levels, such as individuals, organizations, systems, and communities. Each map looks different, depending on the organization's unique needs and preferences. They've incorporated the views of young people, youth-led and youth-serving organizations, and experts so that our map reflects young people's view of how change occurs. Additionally, They have documented the assumptions that underlie our initiative, including philosophies, principles, and values; ways to work together; community context, and other assumptions upon which we have based our change effort. These assumptions are presented as a succinct narrative statement.

=== Introduction ===
Much has changed since The Youth Café Limited was founded nearly a decade ago. Bolstered by grassroots knowledge, The Youth Café is dedicated to reducing youth deprivation and socio-economic, and political empowerment. Today, they are actively working on a number of cross-cutting issues. Their eight priority areas are: 1)Culture, Arts and Sports; 2) Governance and Political Inclusion: Accountability; 3) Governance and Political Inclusion: Remittances; 4) Peace and Security 5) Education and Vocational Skills; 6) Business, Job Creation and Entrepreneurship; 7) Universal Health Coverage; and 8) Environmental Preservation and Climate Change. By using Thematic Working Groups methodology to power our goals, these themes provide an organizing structure that underpins the design, development, implementation, and evaluation of our initiatives.

The Youth Cafe acknowledges that problems afflicting young people in Africa today are easier to recognize. Typically, they are pressing, cannot be ignored and the dream of eradicating them fuels the energy and passion within The Youth Café to make a difference. How can our interventions or programs actually lead to lasting changes? What type of evidence indicates progress? Which strategies are most effective to achieve the desired results? These are the reasons why The Youth Café needs a roadmap for change, now more than ever. Instead of bridges, avenues, and freeways, their map illustrates destinations of progress and the routes to travel on the way to achieving the aforementioned. The map also provides commentary about assumptions, such as the final destination, the context for the map, the processes to engage in during the journey, and the belief system that underlies the importance of traveling in a particular way. The map is their "theory of change."

=== Structure ===
In this theory of change, they use techniques that match their tolerance for "planning" and "execution". They have worked to develop an outcome map, a visual diagram that depicts relationships between the organization's strategies and intended results. This result includes both short- and longer-term outcomes and also reflects changes at different levels, such as individuals, organizations, systems, and communities. Each map looks different, depending on The Youth Café's unique needs and preferences. We have incorporated the views of young people, youth-led and youth-serving organizations, and experts so that their map reflects young people's view of how change occurs. Thus, they have generated two products as part of their theory of change work:

- An outcome map
- A list of assumptions about the change they seek.

=== Principles ===
The Youth Cafe Principles have been developed by over 1,500 of our members drawn from the East- and the Horn of Africa, the Middle East and North Africa, and the Sahel Regions coordinated by The Youth Cafe Secretariat. The principles are a call to action for governments, civil society, private and public sector, bi- and multilateral and knowledge institutions to invest in the prospects of young people and to work in partnership with young people. These principles call upon organizations to recognize and invest in an inclusive manner and specifically in the opportunities of youth - recognizing the unique challenges they face and ensuring that no young person is left behind.

=== Type of Changes Mapped ===
Positive Youth Development initiatives typically encompass myriad strategies, interventions, and activities. Some are planned, clearly defined, staffed, and funded – for example, an awareness-building campaign or community mobilization effort. Others may be spontaneous, emergent, informal, or sporadic, such as networking, leadership development, or network/coalition building. As an organization, we are cognizant of the fact that we need to have the relevant resources and investments to ensure that the activities/ interventions take place accordingly. Such resources include funds, networks and our knowledge, and thus we refer to them as inputs. Our outputs are the immediate results of our activities and they are necessary for achieving the outcomes. They are positive indicators that the outcomes are on track.

==== Activities ====
The Youth Cafe focuses on eight different thematic areas/activities. Each thematic area has distinctive inputs, outputs, and outcomes. One of their activities is on Education, Skills, and Technology. Their aim is to create opportunities for young people to develop employability skills and competencies including numeracy and literacy, “21st century skills” like critical thinking, communication skills, digital/media literacy skills, and adaptability to take on future challenges and opportunities in society while increasing their adaptability in the era of the fourth industrial revolution and access to high-quality job opportunities.

==== Outputs ====
Most youths have access to knowledge, information, and health care including; correct perception of their risks on HIV; increased knowledge on sexual behavior; the need to resist forced sex from a partner(s) including having multiple intergenerational sexual partners; and drug use during sexual intercourse that compounds the vulnerability of young people to HIV.

==== Leverage: Outcomes ====
Their LEVERAGE: Outcome Areas And Outcome Statements/focuses on different changes such as improving The Youth Cafe and other Youth-Led and Youth serving partner organization abilities to finance their own economic and social development by promoting a comprehensive Agency approach to help the organizations mobilize public revenues and expend resources effectively, transparently, and with accountability, while creating the enabling conditions for private investment.

==== Population-level Outcomes ====
Their aspiration on Changes in Universal Health Coverage is to provide key education opportunities such as access to knowledge, information, and health care young people need including; correct perception of their risks on HIV; increased knowledge on sexual behavior; the need to resist forced sex from partner(s) including having multiple intergenerational sexual partners; and drug use during sexual intercourse that compounds vulnerability of young people to HIV.

==== Impacts: organizational Outcomes ====
One of their outcome areas is Changes in knowledge/skills which goes with the outcome statement to enhance youth-centered capacity to generate, collect, synthesize, and disseminate evidence and learning powered by youth-friendly dissemination platforms (digital and physical) that ensure seamless knowledge transfer to enhance young people's employability and capacity for leadership and development of 21st-century skills and competencies.

=== How The Changes relate to The Youth Cafe’s core capacities ===
The Youth Cafe's core capacities are the central guides that enable our powerful strategies to become actualized. Our core capacities represent our beliefs and our deeply held values for development. They understand that lasting change is created through unique opportunities for unique problems facing different societies. They work in youth development is geared towards forming outstanding ideals that separate the organization from others. They truly believe that our building blocks will continue to impact the change we seek to see in youth and youth stakeholders. All the projects that The Youth Cafe handles are founded on the capacities we have established and continue to strengthen. These capacities include our administrative structures, professional and social networks, knowledge base, and leadership.

=== Outcome Map: Their Goals, Strategies, and Impacts ===
Creating a picture of how different types of outcomes relate to each other helps clarify what The Youth Cafe intends to do. They use the “outcome map” as a tool to depict what they expect will happen as a result of their initiatives, strategies, activities, and programmatic efforts. Using an outcome map, they have visually laid out The Youth Cafe's pathway of change. Their outcomes are “mapped” in a causal sequence, although we understand that change is typically more complex than a simple cause-and-effect relationship. In some cases, our outcomes occur sequentially, while other times they occur simultaneously. The Youth Cafe's outcomes sometimes occur independently from each other or are highly interrelated. They may result from a single strategy or multiple ones, leading to common goals or separate ones.

=== Assumptions and risks ===
Articulating their Assumptions. While The Youth Cafe's outcome map offers a visual sketch of the pathways to achieving their outcomes, their work is embedded in a context. They acknowledge that it's helpful to complete the story by articulating the assumptions that influenced the map's design. Core assumptions that underpin The Youth Cafe Theory of Change explains why and how the steps in their Pathway of Change diagram enable the achievement of empowerment for young people.

=== Conclusion ===
The Theory of Change is a necessary tool for the development of an organization, and the transition of inputs and activities to outputs, outcomes, and impacts. It creates a shared understanding of the changes that take place in an organization and the parties involved in that process. This detailed document is developed by relating all the aspects of the organization that direct them to their ultimate vision and mission. The Youth Cafe understands the importance of managing change in an organization as the guide towards achieving the goals set ahead. Impact changes at the organizational and population-level drive the organization to a defined future effect in youth development. The impact changes anchor the transformation requirements, designs, and processes to our desired state.

=== Glossary of terms ===
Throughout the Theory of Change, they use certain words, terminologies and phrases that are unique to The Youth Cafe.

== Governance and Leadership ==
=== Advisory Board ===
The Board main role is supporting the senior leadership team at the secretariat to ensure The Youth Café is both sustainable and growing. Their roles include: challenging The Youth Café's activities vis-à-vis legal and regulatory requirements, ambassadorial and providing strategic guidance. However, the secretariat (young professionals) solely makes the executive decisions. The Board comprises a minimum of 8 and a maximum of 12 non-executive directors in addition to three executive directors: The Executive Director, Finance Director and Secretariat Coordinator. After three years they all seek re-appointment. It is compulsory for the Head of Operations and Finance and the Head of Partnerships to turn up at every meeting, while, section leads are invited to put forward their section's accomplishments, challenges and future development on a rotational basis. They meet annually in February, May and November with a half day strategy session yearly. To represent the youth, at least three board members are under the age of 35.

=== The Secretariat ===
Made up of youths (young professionals) between 18 and 35 years. They include operational secretariat consisting of staff, consultants, part-time contractors, interns, and volunteers.

They are the cardinal decision-making body that makes all project decisions and executive programs at The Youth Cafe, as per the motto “for youth by youth”.

The executive director, the Head of Partnerships and the Head of Operations & Finance are the senior most and reporting to them, are the coordinator and Technical Coordinator, Main secretariat and Section Leads. From their headquarters in Nairobi, projects are executed across Africa.

== Friends of the Youth Café ==
The Youth Café's Group of Friends, is a community of international organizations that actively promotes the objectives and work of The Youth Cafe at the local, regional and global levels. Their input, advice and support are taken into account in all key aspects in a dialogue-based and consensus building approach.

Currently they include individuals, 120 United Nations Member agencies, and international organizations representing all cultures, continents and societies. They meet two to four times a year (at virtual and on-site regular meetings) to deliberate about The Youth Cafe's activities and provide inputs.

They Group of Friends include: IREX, AISEC, the Hewlett Foundation, SOS Villages, Catholic University of Eastern Africa, Global Friends in Action and others.

== The Thematic Areas ==
The Youth's Café deals with cross-cutting issues, but majors on eight priority areas with a multidisciplinary and multi-perspective approach. The pillars directs and focuses the development and implementation of their programs and initiatives. They play an integral role in socio-economic and political empowerment of youths in Africa as well as reducing youth deprivation. The pillars are:

=== Peace and Security, Including Preventing Violent Extremism ===
Violence by extremist groups (Al-Shabab, Boko Haram and others have sparked of a humanitarian situation among others Lake Chad Basin.

Consequently, over 2.5 million people have been displaced causing economic dis-empowerment and inability to access basic services. For stability, development and humanitarian actors, as well as the Multinational Joint Task Force (MNJTF) has stepped in to help and the EU has invested over EUR 700 million. In spite of all this, there is minimal progress due to lack of coordination on the ground, and a dearth of information about the stabilization strategies.

UNSCR 2250 recognizes the role of young people towards stability, as well as the Stabilization Strategy (adopted in August 2018 by the Lake Chad Basin Commission Member States and endorsed by the AU Peace & Security Council in December, 2018) which focuses on bridging the gap between political will, financing and reality of progress on the ground.

=== Governance and Political Inclusion (Accountability) ===
One of The Youth Café's strategic objective is, ensuring “a transparent, democratic and accountable environment” which in turn leads to, “political stability, effective governance and reduced fragility”. The AU has developed the African Governance Architecture. Though, internationally, the International Aid Transparency Initiative and locally social auditing and budget reviews already exist; further collaborations among stakeholders can be increased. Since youths are underrepresented in governance, The Youth Cafe has invested in skills development useful in governance-enabling activities and increasing accountability.

=== Culture, Arts and Sports (CAS) ===
CAS can tackle major universal challenges – such as social integration, conflict prevention and resolution, protection of cultural heritage and prevention of violent extremism. With an estimated growth rate of 7% global GDP, culture and creative arts industry if well harnessed, can contribute to economic growth, socio-economic stability and sustainable development. The 2007 Africa Strategy (JAES), proposes a stronger cultural cooperation and EUR 40 million was allocated under the European Development Fund towards that. Visible initiatives like creating networks, financing and training on the necessary skills will improve the careers of CAS professionals.

=== Education and Skills ===
To prepare youths for the future, they need skills and competencies in addition to accessing quality education. The Youth Café plans to provide high-quality education and training systems, that are efficient and that facilitate young people's access and integration. In line with UNESCO 2030 goals, SDG 4 and international commitments, support must be given to relevant stakeholders who provides quality education that equip youths with skills and competencies, to take on future challenges and opportunities in the world.

Multi-stakeholder collaborations such as VET, Global Education and STEM are vital in imparting “21st century skills” and creating innovative learning environments. Research has shown that these collaborations, improve international competitiveness, innovation and productivity. Studies have shown that the demographic dividend is an education-triggered dividend and as such investments must be directed towards education as well as policy change.

=== Business, Job Creation and Entrepreneurship ===
Three million jobs are currently created a year in Sub-Saharan Africa, however, 18 million jobs a year will need to be created by 2035. Youths must be uniquely positioned and empowered to stimulate innovation, creativity and create social capital in key sectors such as agribusiness and renewable energy in order to shape a shared future and economy. Of concern are the gaps in support services for young entrepreneurs, and limited and/or no knowledge of and access to current flagship initiatives.

=== Universal Health Coverage Reform ===
Currently, the worldwide adolescents’ population is 1.2 billion (10–19 years old), and this number will rise through 2050. Nearly, 90% live in low- and middle-income countries with limited knowledge, information and access to quality health services and are thus unable to deal with their health issues that are both preventable and treatable. Health service providers do not have tailored services nor offer specific health needs to adolescents with factors such as: religion, age, ethnicity, sex, disability, gender identity, wealth, marital status, location sexual orientation and, migratory status and other characteristics aggravating the situation. Due to this, adolescents have not benefited from the halved mortality rate (during the Millennium Development Goal period) by younger children with more than 1.2 million adolescent deaths yearly.

=== Governance and Political Inclusion (Remittances) ===
Remittances in Africa helps reduce poverty and generate domestic resources and is thus a key area to The Youth Cafe. Sustainable Development Goal (SDG) 10 aims to reduce the transaction costs of migrant remittances to under 3% and eliminate corridors with costs above 5%. Currently, costs stagnate around 7% affecting young people who mostly are 'undocumented', 'unbanked', and poor. This is despite the fact that youths are at the forefront in the use of new technologies like mobile money. The EU in 2014 supported the AU in the establishment of the African Institute for Remittances (AIR), which deals in promoting reforms in legal and regulatory frameworks. Additionally, they provide statistical data (SendMoneyAfrica comparison database). More information and transparency about remittance fees and user-friendly applications is needed.

=== Environmental Preservation and Climate Change ===
The main causes of climate change in Africa is land / water management and soil deterioration. The Great Green Wall initiative, was launched in 2007 as the AU's flagship initiative to decelerate Sahara Desert expansion, deal with land degeneration, improve food security, and promote transformational adaptability of communities to adjust to climate change. An articulate mapping can help further advance the GGW. Increased support for agroforestry can: offer incentives for youth to live in rural areas and partake in activities fostering the viable use of natural resources; alleviate the effect of climate change and also provide livelihood opportunities for youth in the region.

== Roles of The Youth Café ==
- As a mobilizing force – Results are only achieved through partnerships with various entities like governments, international organizations, civil societies, etc.
- As a convener – Facilitates a structured meaningful engagement (physical and digital spaces) and feedback between youths (including young women and marginalized) and different organizations.
- As a global bridge builder – Informs, educates and connects youths to organizations and opportunities that address issues relevant to African youths.
- As a unique Youth Initiative – Empowering youths, strengthening community resilience, driving social progress, suggesting innovative solutions and encouraging political change in Africa.
- As a creative amplifying laboratory in Africa – champions for policies that encourages youth involvement and participation at the national, regional and global levels.
- As catalytic action-driven initiative – supporting and implementing novel projects on the ground majoring on the 8 key pillars.

== Popular Programs ==
The Youth Cafe has various programs. Some of the more popular ones include but not limited to:

- Membership. Anyone is free to join The Youth Cafe and become a member. Members are entitled to some privileges.
- Volunteer. The Youth Cafe offers a cross-section of volunteers a chance to engage and impact the community in the various roles assigned.
- Internship. The Youth Cafe offers qualified and eligible local, international, and diaspora students office-based, online, and in the field Internship.
- Tours and Trips. The Youth Cafe offers socially responsible travel & custom-designed guided tours that support conservation, local communities and native customs. Their tours are designed to facilitate a two-way cultural exchange that leaves a lasting, positive impression on visitor, host, and country.
- Grassroots Fundraising. The Youth Cafe encourages fundraisers to sign up with them to be part of their fundraising campaign.

== Activities ==
The Youth Café's activities are in line with the 8 major pillars. They include:

- Activities on Culture, Arts and Sports (CAS)
- Activities on Peace and Security
- Activities on Governance: Accountability
- Activities on Governance: Remittances
- Activities on Environment and Climate Change
- Activities on Education and Skills
- Activities on Business, Jobs and Entrepreneurship
- Activities on Universal Health Coverage for Youth
