= CCPP =

CCPP may refer to:

- Center for Cosmology and Particle Physics
- Combined cycle power plant
- Come Croquetas Pinche Perro
- Contagious caprine pleuropneumonia
