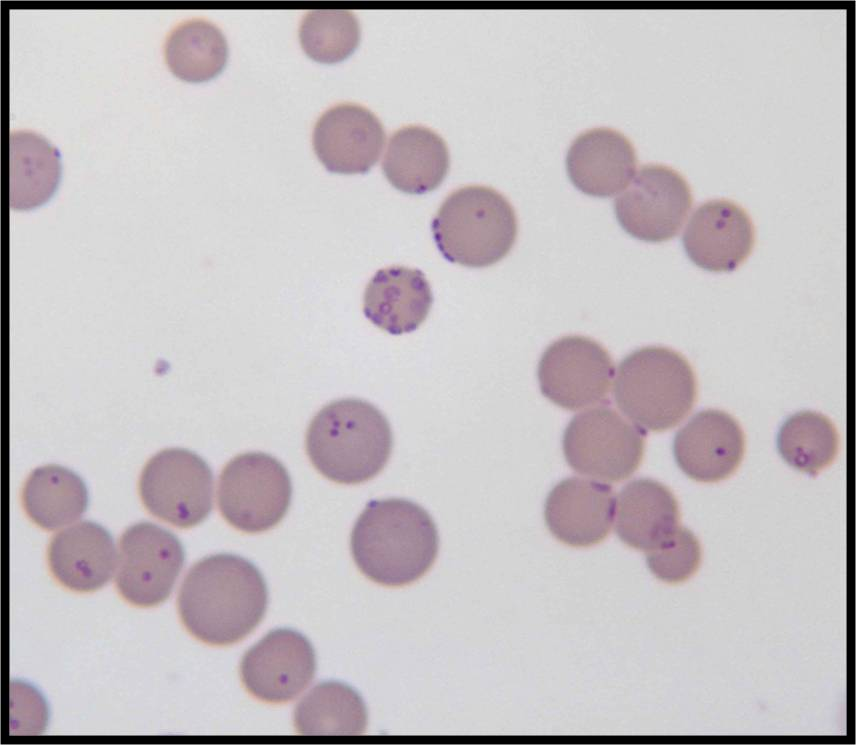

Scientific classification
- Domain: Bacteria
- Kingdom: Bacillati
- Phylum: Mycoplasmatota
- Class: Mollicutes
- Order: Mycoplasmatales
- Family: Mycoplasmataceae
- Genus: Mycoplasma
- Species: M. haemofelis

Binomial name
- Mycoplasma haemofelis Neimark et al. 2002

Synonyms
- Ca. "M. haemofelis" Neimark et al. 2001; Haemobartonella felis (ex Clark 1942) Kreier and Ristic 1984

= Mycoplasma haemofelis =

Parasitic bacterium

Mycoplasma haemofelis is an epierythrocytic parasitic bacterium. It often appears in bloodsmears as small (0.6 μm) coccoid bodies, sometimes forming short chains of three to eight organisms. It is usually the causative agent of feline infectious anemia (FIA) in Canada and the United States.

The ~1.15 Mb genome contains a minimalistic assortment of genes limited to the most basic cellular functions. This leaves M. haemofelis inextricably dependent upon its host for the provision of amino acids, cholesterol, vitamins and fatty acids. The complex and specific conditions that the bacterium requires have made it impossible to culture outside a host thus far.

Arthropod vectors are thought to be the primary source of infection, although M. haemofelis is also known to be transmitted from queen to kitten and following blood transfusion. Immunocompromisation and/or coinfection with FeLV, FIV and other Mycoplasma species can exacerbate symptoms or cause symptoms to arise in previously asymptomatic individuals. Symptoms include anemia, lethargy, fever, and anorexia.

In suspected cases, polymerase chain reaction (PCR) tests have become common and commercially available. Tests that can confirm or deny the presence of infection in the body are not yet available; a negative PCR test doesn't always mean a cat is not infected. It is recommended to perform multiple peripheral blood smears prior to excluding the disease.

Recent evidence suggests that M. haemofelis may be transmissible to humans.

== Classification ==
Mycoplasma haemofelis belongs to the phylogenetically diverse class Mollicutes, which comprises eight genera: Ureaplasma, Spiroplasma, Asteroleplasma, Mesoplasma, Entomoplasma, Acholeplasma, Anaeroplasma, and Mycoplasma. Haemoplasmas is the name given to the trivial cluster that includes M. haemofelis and its close relatives.

Before the advent of modern PCR techniques, M. haemofelis and closely related Haemoplasmas Candidatus Mycoplasma haemominutum and Ca. Mycoplasma turicensis were collectively classified as Haemobartonella felis based on similarities in gross morphology. (The Candidatus distinction is given to newly described species in which additional evidence is required to support their classification.) Jensen et al. 2001 found that M. haemofelis is likely more virulent than M. haemominutum. The inability of researchers to culture many Mycoplasma spp. in vitro has made classification difficult. PCR analysis of 16S rRNA sequences of Haemobartonella spp. showed greater similarity to those of Mollicutes than to those of the family Anaplasmataceae in the order Rickettsiales to which they were previously thought to belong.

PCR-based assays have provided evidence that the Ohio variant and California variant of H. felis are in fact distinct species, M. haemofelis and Ca. Mycoplasma haemominutum respectively. A third Haemoplasma, Mycoplasma turicensis, was later identified in domestic cats. Haemoplasma species have also been identified in dogs (M. haemocanis), mice (M. haemomuris), opossum (Ca. M. haemodidelphis), and alpaca (Ca. M. haemolamae).

== Transmission ==
Although M. haemofelis is generally the least prevalent of the three known feline Haemoplasmas, it causes the majority of FIA cases in the United States. Blood-sucking arthropod vectors including fleas, mosquitoes and ticks are thought to be the primary mode of dissemination of M. haemofelis. Transmission from queen to kitten has also been observed; however, it is unclear whether this takes place in utero, during birth, or through nursing. M. haemofelis has been transmitted by transfusion and oral administration of infected blood. Males show a significant disposition toward M. haemofelis infection; it is thought that biting and scratching may result in the infection of tomcats involved in aggressive behavior. Non-flea means of transmission are believed to exist due to Jensen et al. 2001 finding high prevalence in an area with a low prevalence of flea infestation.

== Pathogenesis ==
Through reductive evolution, the average genome size of M. haemofelis has been decreased to 1.15 Mb. It has shed many biosynthetic systems found in related gram-positive bacteria as well as the ability to secrete a cell wall (rendering it technically gram-negative). This reduction of genetic information has committed M. haemofelis to a parasitic lifestyle in which it is entirely dependent upon host cells for the amino acids, fatty acids and vitamins for which it has lost the ability to synthesize. Consistent with its parasitic lifestyle, the M. haemofelis genome contains a significant number of genes devoted to adhesins, resistance to oxidative stress and the production of variable surface antigens that allow it to persist in the host.

Once in the bloodstream, M. haemofelis individuals adhere to the cell membranes of red blood cells and eventually become partially embedded. After a delay of 2 to 34 days, the acute phase of infection occurs, during which marked parasitemia is often observed. In some cases, up to 90% of red blood cells become parasitized. During this stage of infection, M. haemofelis organisms can be identified in a stained blood smear under light microscopy.

Synchronous phase variation has been observed in natural M. haemofelis infections during which rapid fluctuations in parasitemia are observed. This spontaneous alteration of phenotype seems to allow individuals to detach from erythrocytes by the alteration or concealment of surface antigens. This may facilitate the persistence of M. haemofelis within the host by disguising or eliminating antigens that might elicit an immune response.

Parasitized red blood cells often lose their biconcave shape. This decreases surface area, increases osmotic fragility, and increases the likelihood that these cells will be captured and destroyed by the spleen. The attachment of M. haemofelis to red blood cell membranes is often associated with positive Coombs test results, meaning IgG antibodies have become bound to red blood cells, marking them for destruction. For the most part, the anemia seen in M. haemofelis infection is a result of extravascular erythrophagocytosis by macrophages in the spleen, liver, lungs, and bone marrow.

Left untreated, as many as one-third of cats with acute M. haemofelis infection will die from severe anemia. In cats that mount adequate immune and regenerative responses to acute infection, a recovery time of a month or more may be required before the hematocrit returns to normal. During this recovery time, M. haemofelis is often observed to remain in circulating blood, but in decreased numbers. Cats that recover from acute infections may remain infected for life. Intact M. haemofelis organisms have been observed in the phagocytic vacuoles of splenic and pulmonary macrophages, suggesting that these cells may serve as reservoirs.

Co-infection with FIV, FeLV and Candidatus Mycoplasma haemominutum is common. Although M. haemofelis infection can cause acute hemolytic anemia in otherwise healthy cats, immunosuppression, including that brought on by retroviral pathogenesis, increases susceptibility to the most severe effects of M. haemofelis infection. In some cases, infected cats may remain asymptomatic carriers until compromising of the immune system permits increased parasitemia and the onset of acute symptoms. Chronic M. haemofelis infection may promote neoplastic transformation of white blood cells in FeLV-infected individuals.

== Diagnosis ==
In suspected cases, M. haemofelis can be identified by polymerase chain reaction analysis for species-specific 16S rRNA sequences, as well as by light microscopy. Jensen et al. 2001's PCR assay diagnoses either or both of M. haemofelis and M. haemominutum – useful because they found coinfection with both is common. Several other teams have also found that haemoplasma coinfection is common. Jensen et al. 2001 showed that 17.1% of individuals suspected of haemoplasmosis did suffer from this species. Jensen also found that none of the asymptomatic controls had this species, although some did suffer from M. haemominutum. Foley et al. 1998, Tasker et al. 2003, Westfall et al. 2001, Berent et al. 1998, Jensen et al. 2001, and Tasker et al. 2003 demonstrated that PCR is more sensitive than cytology for haemoplasmas.

The severity of disease produced by M. haemofelis varies, with some cats having mild anemia and no clinical signs and others having marked depression and severe anemia. Clinical signs include lethargy, anorexia and anemia. M. haemofelis infection is suspected in cats with regenerative anemia, in which polychromasia and reticulocytosis are noted. During the acute phase of infection, M. haemofelis can be readily identified on stained blood films; however, M. haemofelis can disappear and reappear in the peripheral blood throughout the course of infection and can be mistaken for stain precipitate, or vice versa. Commercially available PCR assays that detect the Mycoplasma 16s rRNA are a more reliable means of diagnosis. Many such assays are species-specific. Currently, no serological test for M. haemofelis is commercially available. Additional clinical findings may include positive Coombs test results, hypoglycemia, and dehydration.

== Treatment ==
Antibiotic treatment is indicated only for Haemoplasma-positive cats that present clinical signs for FIA. While it is not believed that M. haemofelis can be completely eliminated, regimens of doxycycline or enrofloxacin are effective in reducing bacteraemia. Doxycycline and enrofloxacin combat M. haemofelis infection by interfering with translation and DNA synthesis respectively. These antibiotics carry side effects including esophagitis, GI disease and retinal damage and are thus primarily administered only to cats suffering from acute infection with clinical signs. Furthermore, blood transfusion and administration of glucocorticoids relieve the severe anemia resulting from M. haemofelis infection of erythrocytes. Treated and untreated animals that recover from M. haemofelis infections generally remain carriers but seldom relapse with clinical disease. One clinical study shows that a treatment with doxycycline and marbofloxacin can clear the bacteremia and fully cure the cat from infection.

== Public-health implications ==
Arthropod vectors appear to be the primary mechanism of M. haemofelis transmission. Mycoplasma DNA sequences have been detected in fleas, ticks, and mosquitoes. Given that humans often cohabit with cats and that species of blood-sucking arthropods inhabit most temperate regions, transmission of Haemoplasmas to humans appears possible. Furthermore, all three feline Haemoplasma species have been detected in wild felids, suggesting the possibility that they may act as reservoirs of infection for arthropod transmission. In 2008, M. haemofelis was detected in an AIDS patient from Brazil. The zoonotic potential of M. haemofelis has yet to be fully assessed, but care should be taken when handling blood or tissue from infected cats.
