= Nasuia deltocephalinicola =

Scientific classification (Candidatus)
- Domain: Bacteria
- Phylum: Pseudomonadota
- Class: Betaproteobacteria
- Genus: Nasuia
- Species: Ca. N. deltocephalinicola

Binomial name
- Ca. Nasuia deltocephalinicola corrig. Noda et al. 2012

Species of bacterium

"Candidatus Nasuia deltocephalinicola" was reported in 2013 to have the smallest genome of all bacteria, with 112,091 nucleotides. For comparison, the genome of Escherichia coli has 4.6 million nucleotides. The second smallest genome, from bacteria Ca. Tremblaya princeps, has 139,000 nucleotides. While Ca. N. deltocephalinicola has the smallest number of nucleotides, it has more protein-coding genes (137) than some bacteria.

== Symbiotic relationship ==
Ca. Nasuia deltocephalinicola was discovered when leafhoppers and other phloem- and xylem-feeding insects were investigated for endosymbiotic bacteria. The phloem and xylem of plants are rich in carbohydrates (in the form of sucrose) but lack lipids and proteins. Lipids can be synthesized from carbohydrates; however, proteins require nitrogen, which is not commonly found in plant sap. Ca. Nasuia deltocephalinicola along with other bacterial endosymbionts help the insects by synthesizing 10 essential amino acids that they would not otherwise have. The only insects that can benefit from this relationship are those from the suborder Sternorrhyncha, which feed off phloem, and those from the suborder Auchenorrhyncha, which feed off xylem. Ca. Nasuia deltocephalinicola can synthesize two of the essential amino acids that these insects require. This bacterium uses the UGA codon in its DNA to specify tryptophan instead of the stop as in most other organisms.

The symbiotic relationship between Ca. N. deltocephalinicola and leafhoppers is proposed to have started at least 200 million years ago, when leafhoppers and spittlebugs diverged evolutionarily. This claim is supported by the fact that Ca. N. deltocephalinicola's closest bacterial relative is Zinderia insecticola, which plays the same role for spittlebugs as Ca. N. deltocephalinicola does in leafhoppers. Leafhoppers return the favor by providing shelter in the form of a specialized organ in their abdominal cavity called a bacteriome, which they have on both sides of their abdomens. Many types of bacteria can reside in these organs, though the bacteria are completely separated from each other and reside in different sections of the bacteriome.

Ca. Nasuia deltocephalinicola is an obligate endosymbiont—it cannot thrive without being in a leafhopper. It is an intracellular endosymbiont, living within bacteriocytes, cells that are specialized for housing endosymbiotic bacteria. These bacteriocytes comprise an organ called a bacteriome, whose cells host a variety of bacterial endosymbionts. Intracellular endosymbionts may evolve to depend on the host cells for essential cellular functions. As a result, their genomes often lack genes that would be required for life in an extracellular environment, even one containing abundant nutrients. They have thereby begun the process of evolving from a free-living organism to an intracellular organelle. Ca. Nasuia deltocephalinicola also no longer has genes needed to synthesize ATP through oxidative phosphorylation. It is proposed that this is because of the high sucrose concentration found in xylem and phloem of plants.

== See also ==
- Smallest organisms
