= Feline infectious anemia =

Infectious disease found in felines

Feline infectious anemia (FIA) is an infectious disease found in felines, causing anemia and other symptoms. The disease is caused by a variety of infectious agents, most commonly Mycoplasma haemofelis (formerly called Haemobartonella before Haemobartonella and Eperythrozoon species were reclassified as mycoplasmas).

Coinfection often occurs with other infectious agents, including feline leukemia virus (FeLV), feline immunodeficiency virus (FIV), Ehrlichia species, Anaplasma phagocytophilum and Candidatus Mycoplasma haemominutum.
