= Pleuropneumonia =

Inflammation of the lungs and pleura

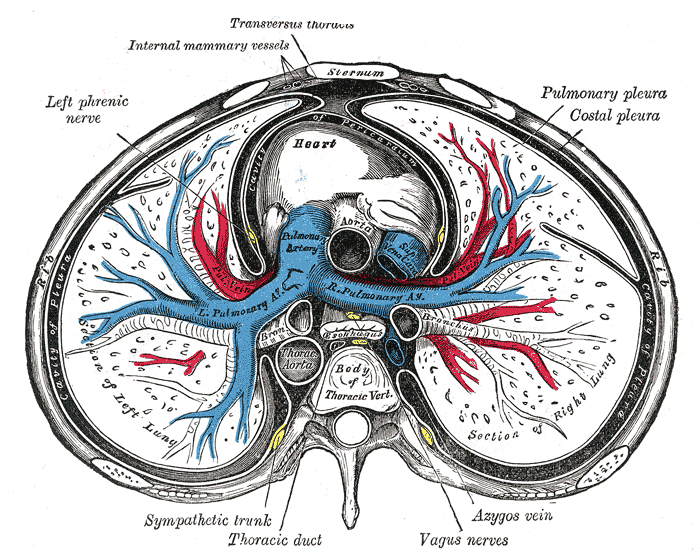
- Lung pleura
- Specialty: Pulmonology

Pleuropneumonia is inflammation of the lungs and pleura, pleurisy being the inflammation of the pleura alone.

== See also ==
- Contagious bovine pleuropneumonia – a disease in cattle
- Contagious caprine pleuropneumonia – a disease in goats
