= Mycoplasma alligatoris =

Scientific classification
- Domain: Bacteria
- Kingdom: Bacillati
- Phylum: Mycoplasmatota
- Class: Mollicutes
- Order: Mycoplasmatales
- Family: Mycoplasmataceae
- Genus: Mycoplasma
- Species: M. alligatoris

Binomial name
- Mycoplasma alligatoris Brown et al. 2001

Species of bacterium

Mycoplasma alligatoris is a species of bacteria in the genus Mycoplasma. M. alligatoris is classified in the family Mycoplasmataceae, order Mycoplasma, class Mollicutes, phylum Firmicutes and domain Bacteria. Many organisms of the genus Mycoplasma are known pathogens in humans and animal species. Mycoplasma alligatoris is known to elicit a fatal disease with inflammatory characteristics that can cause rapid death of alligators and caimans.

== Discovery ==
Mycoplasma alligatoris was first isolated in a study led by D. R. Brown of six captive alligators showing signs of pneumonia, polyserositis (inflammation of serous membranes), and multifocal arthritis. The isolates were obtained from various organs, blood, synovial fluid, and cerebrospinal fluid and subject to various experimental tests for identification purposes. Primary isolates were cultured in ATCC medium 98 agar containing 10^{5} U penicillin G 1^{−1}, 10 ^{5} U polymyin B 1 ^{−1}, 65 mg cefoperazone 1 ^{−1} and 20% (v/v) fetal bovine serum in 5% CO_{2} atmosphere or in ambient air. Isolates were then grown at seven different temperatures in an anaerobic environment, reaching optimum growth at 30 to 34 °C. Cultures were diluted in broth medium then passed through membrane filters of various pore diameters, yielding similar results for all nine isolates. Diluted isolates were then tested for reversion, a method of genetic stabilization unique to some bacteria, in both broth and agar medium. No reversion was observed. Isolates were grown in broth medium with large (20%) and minute (0.2%) amounts of fetal bovine serum as a sterol source. Growth was inhibited in the latter, indicating dependence on an outside sterol source for growth. The 16S rRNA gene was sequenced, yielding a unique sequence, suggesting the discovery of a previously unidentified organism. The Brown study in 2001 further investigated the pathogenicity of the newly discovered M. alligatoris by inoculation of four healthy alligators with the bacteria and one control alligator inoculated with sterile broth. Three of the experimental alligators died within three weeks of inoculation. The surviving alligator tested free of M. alligatoris after 14 weeks, further supporting the researchers suspicions of the new isolate as the cause of the investigated symptoms.

== Preliminary characterization ==
Mycoplasma alligatoris is a non-motile chemoorganoheterotroph found in American alligators. It has an optimum growth temperature range of 30-34 °C. The DNA sequence for M. alligatoris type strain A21JP2T was obtained through random shotgun sequencing, revealing a genome size of 1040–1060 kb, with 89% being coding sequences. The M. alligatoris genome has a 26% G+C content. DNA analysis identified genes of the N-acetylneuraminate scavenging and catabolism pathway.

Biochemical tests including metabolism of glucose, mannose, lactose, sucrose, arginine, aesculin, urea and phosphatase activity performed on M. alligatoris isolates showed that the organism ferments glucose, mannose, lactose, and sucrose and displays phosphatase activity.

DNA sequencing analysis revealed genes encoding a complement of glycosidases, which include hyaluronidases, two sialidases, three β-galactosidases, α-amylase (glycogenase), and two glycosyltransferases. M. alligatoris differs from other species of the Mycoplasma genus by the aforementioned complement of sialidases, which are enzymes of the hydrolase class.

== Pathogenicity ==
Comparisons of the M. alligatoris genome and that of its nearest known relative, Mycoplasma crocodyli, were analyzed in hopes of understanding the unusually aggressive nature of the M. alligatoris species. Mycoplasma crocodyli is much less virulent than M. alligatoris, lacking the genes for adhesins, variable surface antigens, and sialidases found in M. alligatoris. Sialidase, in combination with hyaluronidase, is thought to act as a virulence factor responsible for the pathogenicity of the organism, working together as potential promoters of the expression of CD95 (FasR). CD95 is a protein involved in mediated cell death of eukaryotic cells. In a study done in 2005, researchers used immunofluorescence imaging to observe the outcome of M. alligatoris in vitro on apoptosis by cardiac fibroblasts of alligators. Results of the study showed that M. alligatoris produces an infection that changes the morphology in cardiac fibroblasts, increasing CD95 expression leading to cell death.

== Ecological impact ==
Experimental inoculation of American alligators (Alligator mississippienis), Siamese crocodiles (Crocdylus siamensis), and broad-nosed caimans (Caiman latirostris) with M. alligatoris yielded growth of the bacteria in all species tested. However, the infected Siamese crocodiles showed no symptoms of disease as seen in alligators and caimans. The commensal relationship observed between M. alligatoris and C. siamensis suggests the crocodilian as a potential natural reservoir for M. alligatoris. The transmission of M. alligatoris is unknown, but due to its presence in captive alligators, researchers warn against returning captive alligators to their natural habitats, fearing these animals may function as a vector for infecting wild populations.

As major predators of their ecosystem, alligators help to control the populations they prey on. The various ecological roles of the alligator also include providing shelter for various animals with their abandoned gator holes. The submerged cavities remain full of water throughout the dry season and provide critical nourishment for an abundance of wildlife such as fish, turtles, birds and insects.
