= Contagious caprine pleuropneumonia =

Bacterial disease of goats

Contagious caprine pleuropneumonia (CCPP) is a cause of major economic losses to goat producers in Africa, Asia and the Middle East.

Disease is caused by members of the Mycoplasma – usually Mycoplasma capricolum subsp. capricolum but sometimes by M. mycoides subsp. capri or M. mycoides subsp. mycoides. It is extremely contagious with very high morbidity and mortality rates, causing an interstitial fibrinous pleuropneumonia in infected goats. Infection is spread by close-contact aerosol, therefore overcrowding and confinement increases disease incidence. Stress factors such as malnutrition and long transport can also predispose animals to disease.

Goats are the only species affected, therefore the disease is not a zoonosis. There is no age breed or sex predilection, but clinical signs are often worse in younger animals.

== Clinical signs ==
Affected animals normally have generalised signs such as depression, dullness, weakness and lethargy, pyrexia and weight loss and decreased production. They will also have respiratory signs including bilateral nasal discharge, dyspnoea, tachypnoea and coughing. Occasionally the only sign seen is sudden death.

Typical pathological lesions are very suggestive of the disease – they are localised exclusively to the lung and pleura. Lungs are normally a port wine colour and abundant pleural exudate and pleuritis and adhesions are common. The pleural exudates may have solidified forming a gelatinous covering.

Histological examination of the lung tissues may show acute serofibrinous to chronic fibrino-necrotic pleuropneumonia with neutrophilic inflammation in the alveoli, bronchioles, interstitial septae and subpleural connective tissue.

== Diagnosis ==
The simplest procedure for 'in field diagnosis' is the detection of antibodies by latex agglutination (LAT) as it is quick and simple to run, and has a long shelf-life. Other procedures used for diagnosis include growth inhibition disc tests (GI), direct and indirect fluorescent antibody tests, complement fixation tests (CFT), indirect haemagglutination test (IHA), ELISA, and PCR. These have varying degrees of efficacy.

Isolation of M. capricolum subsp. capripneumoniae from clinical samples is the only way to definitively diagnose the infection but it is not normally performed as it is time consuming and difficult.

== Treatment and control ==
Macrolides, tetracyclines, and quinolones are active against M. capricolum subsp. capripneumoniae. Disease incidence is reduced by good hygiene and husbandry practices.

Movement restrictions and slaughtering infected animals are recommended for countries that are newly infected.

== See also ==
- Contagious bovine pleuropneumonia
- Mycoplasma
- Mycoplasma mycoides
