= International Organization for Mycoplasmology =

The International Organisation for Mycoplasmology (IOM) is a non-profit making organisation founded in 1976. It promotes the study of mycoplasmas (mollicutes), bacteria without a cell wall, and the diseases associated with them.

== Areas of research ==
The IOM produces an annual report covering all areas of mycoplasmology. Specific areas of research currently undertaken include mycoplasma arthritis, avian mycoplasmas, cell culture mycoplasmas, molecular genetics, phytoplasmas and ureaplasmas. The IOM also puts emphasis on pathogenesis, vaccines and mycoplasmal diseases of domestic animals and plants.

== Membership ==
In 2013 the institute had about 500 members. Specialists include: microbiologists, clinicians, biochemists, entomologists, plant pathologists, veterinarians and geneticists.

== See also ==
- Emmy Klieneberger-Nobel
- Leonard Hayflick
