= Mycoplasma mycoides =

Scientific classification
- Domain: Bacteria
- Kingdom: Bacillati
- Phylum: Mycoplasmatota
- Class: Mollicutes
- Order: Mycoplasmatales
- Family: Mycoplasmataceae
- Genus: Mycoplasma
- Species group: Mycoplasma mycoides group
- Species: M. mycoides

Binomial name
- Mycoplasma mycoides (Borrel et al., 1910) Freundt, 1955

Subspecies
- Mycoplasma mycoides subsp. capri; Mycoplasma mycoides subsp. mycoides

Species of bacterium

Mycoplasma mycoides is a bacterial species of the genus Mycoplasma in the class Mollicutes. This microorganism is a parasite that lives in ruminants. Mycoplasma mycoides is a bacterial species with two subspecies: M. mycoides subsp. mycoides, which causes contagious bovine pleuropneumonia (CBPP) in cattle, and M. mycoides subsp. capri, which causes contagious caprine pleuropneumonia (CCPP) in goats.

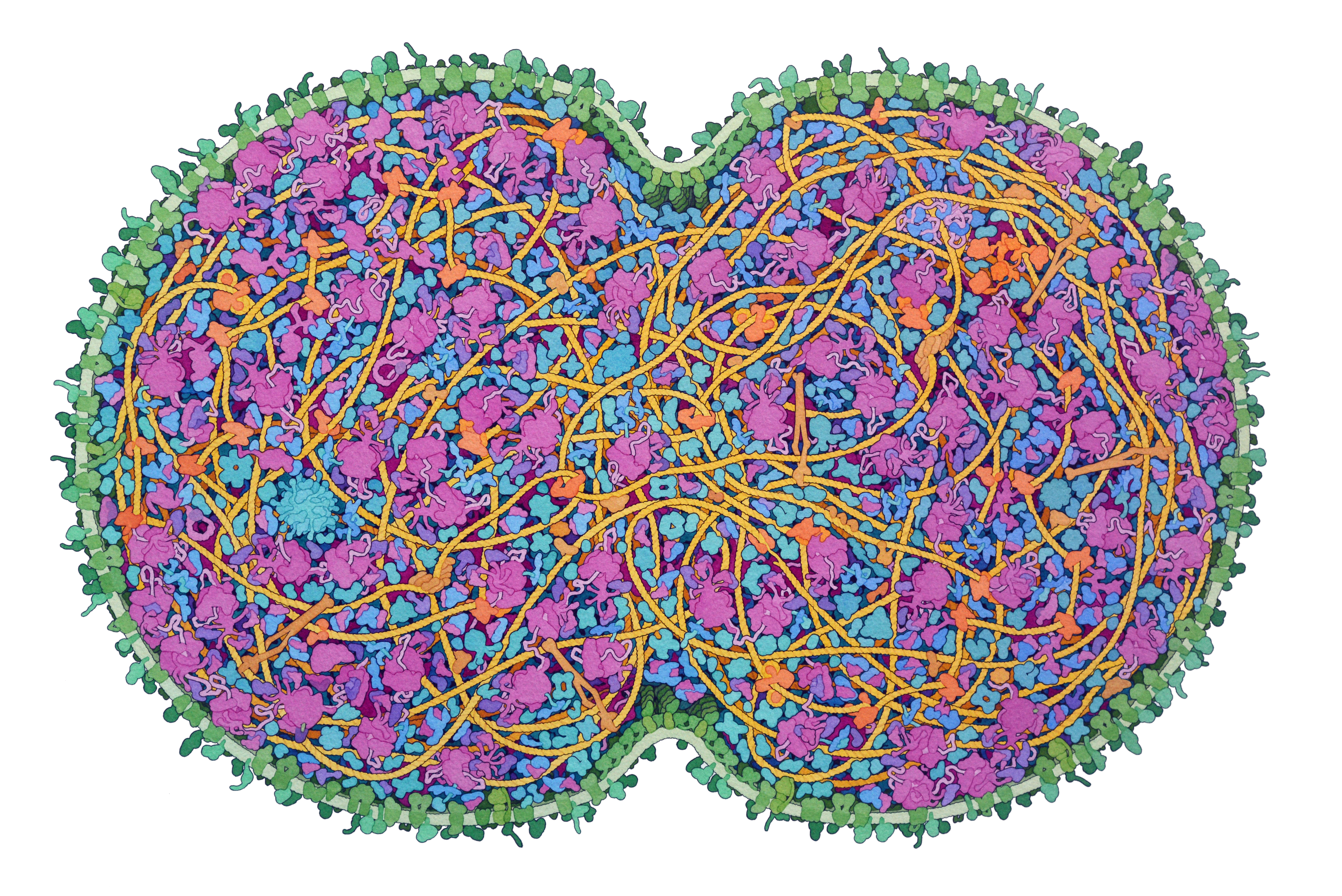
Scientifically accurate watercolor painting of JCVI-syn3A during cell division made by David Goodsell in 2022. JCVI-syn3A is a genetically modified version of Mycoplasma mycoides created by the J. Craig Venter Institute.

== Mycoplasma mycoides subsp. mycoides ==
The subspecies "Mycoplasma mycoides subsp. mycoides (Mmm)", previously named "Mycoplasma mycoides subsp. mycoides Small Colony (SC) type (MmmSC)", is known as the agent of contagious bovine pleuropneumonia (CBPP), a contagious lung disease of cattle. It was first isolated in 1898 by Edmond Nocard et al. as the first bacteria from the Mycoplasma genus to be isolated at all.

Formerly, M. mycoides subsp. mycoides was known as Asterococcus mycoides.

== The Mycoplasma mycoides cluster ==
Mycoplasma mycoides belongs to the Mycoplasma mycoides cluster, or Mycoplasma mycoides group, a group of closely related infectious mycoplasmas, first named by Weisburg et al.

The cluster sensu stricto contains the genera Mycoplasma mycoides and Mycoplasma capricolum and comprises six species and subspecies:

- M. mycoides subsp. mycoides biotype Small Colony (MmmSC)
- M. mycoides subsp. mycoides biotype Large Colony (MmmLC)
- M. mycoides subsp. capri (Mmc)
- M. capricolum subsp. capricolum (Mcc)
- M. capricolum subsp. capripneumoniae (Mccp)
- Mycoplasma sp. 'bovine group 7' (MBG7)

The last one is disputed with respect to the question of being a separate species.

In 2009, L. Manso-Silván et al. proposed to consider M. mycoides subsp. mycoides biotype Large Colony as equal with M. mycoides subsp. capri. Furthermore, they proposed the name Mycoplasma leachii sp. nov. for Mycoplasma sp. 'bovine group 7' as a separate species.

== Genome ==
The first genome of Mycoplasma mycoides to be sequenced was that of strain PG1^{T}, the Causative Agent of Contagious Bovine Pleuropneumonia (CBPP). It has a single circular chromosome of 1,211,703 bp and contains 985 putative genes, of which 72 are part of insertion sequences and encode transposases. This was the highest density of insertion sequences (13% of the genome size) of all sequenced bacterial genomes at the time of its publication (2004).

== Minimal genome project ==
In 2010, as part of the Minimal Genome Project, a team of the J. Craig Venter Institute synthesized a modified version (JCVI-syn1.0) of the 1,000,000 base pair M. mycoides genome and implanted it into a DNA-free bacterial shell of Mycoplasma capricolum; the resulting organism was shown to be self-replicating.

In 2016, the Venter Institute used genes from the JCVI-syn1.0 to synthesize an even smaller genome they call JCVI-syn3.0, that contains 531,560 base pairs and 473 genes.
