= Anaeroplasma =

Scientific classification
- Domain: Bacteria
- Kingdom: Bacillati
- Phylum: Mycoplasmatota
- Class: Mollicutes
- Order: Anaeroplasmatales
- Family: Anaeroplasmataceae
- Genus: Anaeroplasma; Robinson et al. 1975 (Approved Lists 1980) (type genus of the order Anaeroplasmatales Robinson and Freundt 1987; type genus of the family Anaeroplasmataceae Robinson and Freundt 1987).

Type species
- Anaeroplasma abactoclasticum Robinson et al. 1975 (Approved Lists 1980)

Genus of bacteria

Anaeroplasma is a genus in the phylum Mycoplasmatota (Bacteria).

== Etymology ==
The name Anaeroplasma derives from:Greek prefix an, not, without; Greek noun aer, air; Greek neuter gender noun plasma (πλάσμα), anything formed or moulded, image, figure, form; New Latin neuter gender noun Anaeroplasma, a form not living in air, intended to mean anaerobic mycoplasma.

== Species ==
The genus contains 4 species, namely

- Anaeroplasma abactoclasticum ( Robinson et al. 1975, species. (Type species of the genus).; Greek prefix a, not, without; Greek bakt- (Latin transliteration bact-), part of the stem of the Greek dim. noun bakterion (Latin transliteration bacterium), a small rod; New Latin adjective clasticus -a -um (from Greek adjective klastos -ē -on, broken in pieces), breaking; New Latin neuter gender adjective abactoclasticum, intended to mean not bacteriolytic.)
- Anaeroplasma bactoclasticum ( (Robinson and Hungate 1973) Robinson and Allison 1975, species.; Greek bakt- (Latin transliteration bact-), part of the stem of the Greek dim. noun bakterion (Latin transliteration bacterium), a small rod; New Latin adjective clasticus -a -um (from Greek adjective klastos -ē -on, broken in pieces), breaking; New Latin neuter gender adjective bactoclasticum, bacteria-breaking.)
- Anaeroplasma intermedium ( Robinson and Freundt 1987, ; Latin neuter gender adjective intermedium, intermediate.)
- Anaeroplasma varium ( Robinson and Freundt 1987, ; Latin neuter gender adjective varium, diverse, varied, intended to mean different from Anaeroplasma bactoclasticum.)
