= Contagious bovine pleuropneumonia =

Contagious bacterial disease

Contagious bovine pleuropneumonia (CBPP – also known as lung plague), primarily affects the pulmonary and pleural tissues of the body, with its characteristic pathological features being fibrinous pneumonia and serofibrinous pleurisy. The disease affects various susceptible hosts, including cattle, water buffalo, zebu, and yaks.

It is caused by the bacterium Mycoplasma mycoides, and the symptoms are pneumonia and inflammation of the lung membranes. The incubation period is 20 to 123 days. It was particularly widespread in the United States in 1879, affecting herds from several states. The outbreak was so severe that it resulted in a trade embargo by the British government, blocking U.S. cattle exports to Britain and Canada. This prompted the United States to establish the Bureau of Animal Industry, set up in 1884 to eradicate the disease, which it succeeded in doing by 1892.

Louis Willems, a Belgian doctor, began pioneering work in the 1850s on animal inoculation against the disease.

The bacteria are widespread in Africa, the Middle East, Southern Europe, as well as parts of Asia. It is an airborne species, and can travel up to several kilometres in the right conditions.

== In Australia ==
Contagious bovine pleuropneumonia came to Australia on a shipment of five head of cattle from England in 1858, imported by one of Melbourne's earliest settlers Mr Boadle. Three weeks later, a heifer named St Bees fell ill. Boadle called in a veterinarian who diagnosed it with the disease. The heifer died three weeks later. While Boadle destroyed the herd, St Bees had already infected a bullock team grazing on a neighbouring property. Pleuropneumonia spread up the overland route to New South Wales, into Queensland and across northern Australia. It later arrived in Western Australia via a shipload of cattle. Only Tasmania was to remain free of the epidemic in Australia.

A national management strategy was implemented in 1959, inspired by the work of chief veterinary officer of the Northern Territory Colonel Lionel Rose. A National Committee for the Control and Eradication of Pleuropneumonia was established, under the Chief of the CSIRO Division of Animal Health and Production, D A Gill. It defined infected, protected and disease-free areas. Once these were established, there were restrictions on the movement of cattle between zones. The national programme was empowered to employ veterinary officers, stock inspectors and police across Australia. Pleuropneumonia was announced to be eradicated in Australia by 1973.

== See also ==
- Contagious caprine pleuropneumonia
- Fog fever
- Minimal genome project
