= Bacteriocyte =

Specialized cell containing endosymbionts

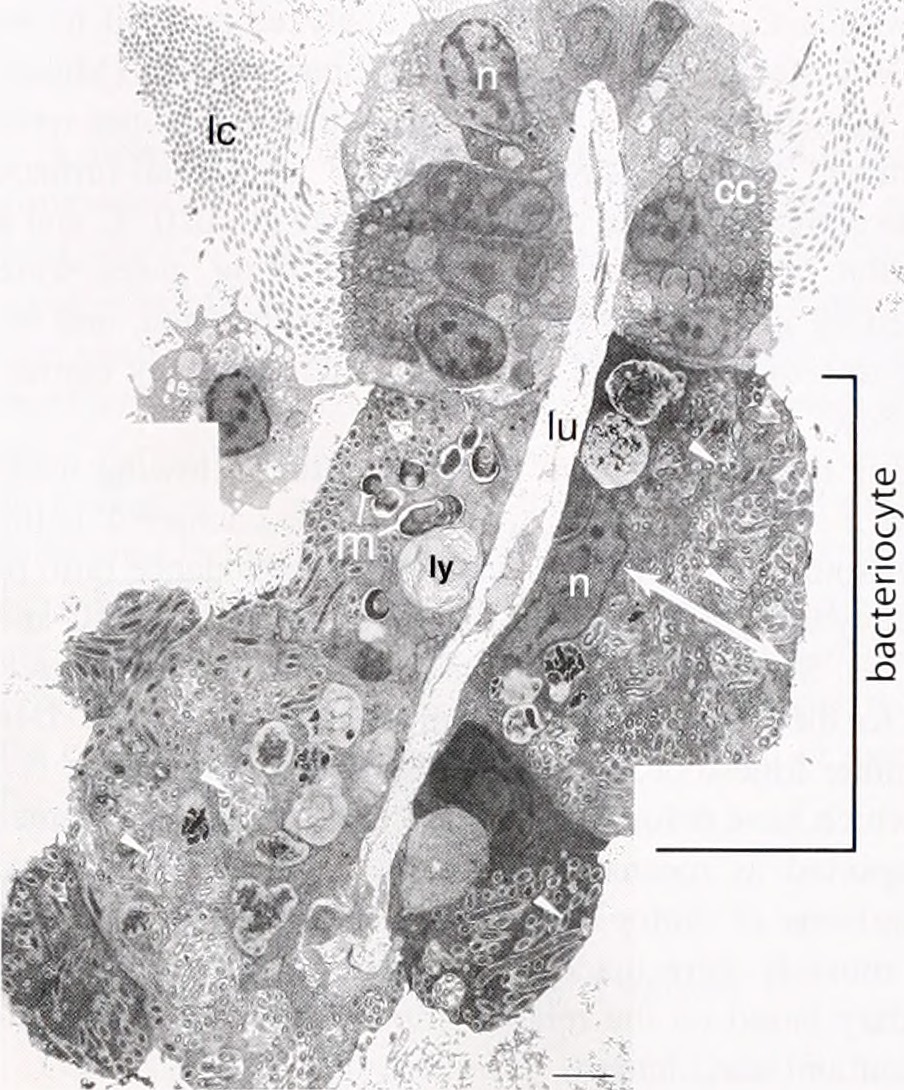
- Post-larval Bathymodiolus azoricus gill filament with prominent bacteriocyte

A bacteriocyte (Greek for bacteria cell), also known as a mycetocyte, is a specialized adipocyte found primarily in certain insects such as aphids, tsetse flies, German cockroaches, weevils, and ants. These cells contain endosymbiotic organisms such as bacteria and fungi, which provide essential amino acids and other chemicals to their host. Bacteriocytes may aggregate into a specialized organ called the bacteriome.

Endosymbiosis with microorganisms is common in insects. More than 10% of insect species rely upon intracellular bacteria for their development and survival. Endosymbionts and their relationships with their hosts are diverse both functionally and genetically. However, the host cell in which bacterial and fungal endosymbionts reside is mostly unknown.

== Location ==
Bacteriocyte location varies depending on the insect and endosymbiont type. These cells often inhabit fat bodies inside the midgut epithelium. The proximity to the insects' digestive system facilitates the absorption of bacteriocyte-produced nutrients. However, fungal-infected bacteriocytes and some bacteria-infected bacteriocytes can sometimes populate the hemocoel, a blood-containing cavity between the organs of most arthropods.

== Development ==
=== Transmission of endosymbionts ===
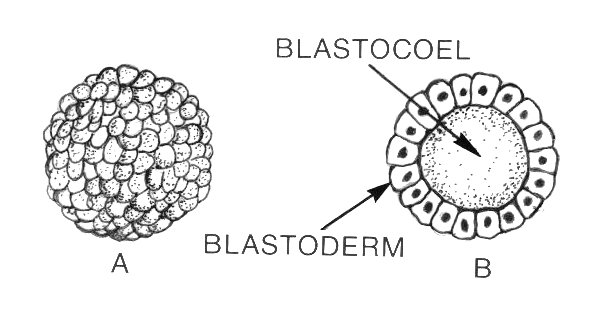
Vertical transmission of endosymbionts from the maternal bacteriocytes is thought to occur in the blastula stage of development.

Bacteriocyte microorganism transfer occurs through vertical transmission from mother to offspring. Horizontal transmission or infection does not typically appear because insects with bacteriocytes depend so significantly on their symbiotic relationships to survive. Hosts without bacteriocytes do not usually survive and reproduce into adulthood. In some cases, the bacteria and fungi are transmitted in the egg, as in Buchnera; in others, like Wigglesworthia, they are transmitted via a milky substance that is fed to the developing insect embryo. Suppression of the Ultrabithorax gene in embryos led to the disappearance of bacteriocytes in Nysius plebius, while manipulation of the Antennapedia gene impacted the formation of bacteriomes but did not halt the formation of bacteriocytes altogether.

Although vertical transmission of the symbionts is pivotal, the underlying and cellular mechanisms of this process are relatively unknown. However, there are several existing hypotheses. One theory is that the microorganisms circulating in the hemolymph of the mother migrate to a posterior region of the offspring blastula containing enlarged follicle cells. Other studies suggest that symbionts are directly transferred from the maternal bacteriocyte to the follicular region of the blastula through exocytic and endocytic transport. A newer hypothesis suggests that a membranous conduit forms between the maternal bacteriocyte and blastula which acts as a bridge for symbionts. Additionally, some studies show that the recognition of stem cell niches and association with dynein, kinesin, and microtubules are crucial for transmission from the parent to the offspring germline as well as segregation to host daughter cells.

=== Growth ===
Bacteriocyte tissue grows considerably during nymphal and larval development as it organizes into two regular clusters near the gut and developing embryonic chains. As some insects grow older, such as aphids, they begin to exhibit disorganized architecture in the bacteriocyte tissue. Eventually, this trend leads to progressive dis-aggregation of the tissue caused by an increasing lack of intercellular adhesion of the cells that only increases as the insect ages. Dis-aggregation appears prominently in reproductively active as well as senescent adults. Some bacteriocyte nuclei, like those in aphids, also follow this pattern of development. They are initially round and centrally positioned but progressively become more deformed and move to the periphery of the cell.

=== Death ===
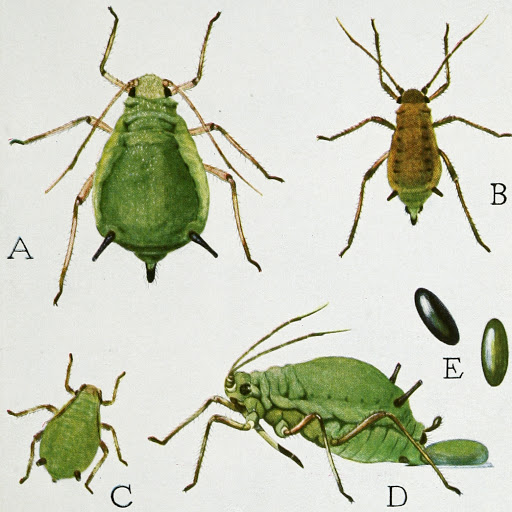
Aphids are closely evolutionarily linked to their endosymbionts and depend on them for survival throughout their entire lifetime, resulting in a distinct form of cell death.

Bacteriocytes can undergo a controlled form of cell death distinct from apoptosis. Elimination of bacteriocytes usually begins when the insect reaches reproductive maturity. Bacteriocyte degeneration begins with cytoplasmic hypervacuolation, meaning an excess of organelles called vacuoles form in the cytoplasm and then progressively expand throughout the entire cell. These vacuoles, which originate from the endoplasmic reticulum, also contain large acidic compartments are thought to aid in cellular degeneration. Hypervacuolation is a common feature in cells that undergo an autophagic, or "self-eating" death. Bacteriocytes, however, do not experience an autophagic death based on the lack of digested cellular components in the vacuoles. Bacteriocytes do develop some organelles to break down cellular components, called autophagosomes, but research suggests that their development is a stress response to adverse cellular conditions caused by the acidic hypervacuolation and not a contributor to cell death. This form of bacteriocyte death is also nonapoptotic, based on the irregular shape of the adult nucleus as well as a lack of chromatin condensation during degeneration and other characteristic features. Genetic testing also reveals a significant inhibition of the apoptotic pathway. Some other cell death characteristics found in bacteriocytes include acid-induced mitochondrial dysfunction, high levels of reactive oxygen species, and In the late phase of cell death, the digestion of endosymbionts by lysosomes.

Other bacteriocytes, like those found in weevils, undergo a different form of cell death. Unlike aphids, weevils lose their bacteriocytes in adulthood. In these species, both apoptotic and autophagic mechanisms quickly eliminate bacteriomes associated with the gut. This form of cell death is more common in insects with a smaller dependence on their endosymbionts. Aphids, on the other hand, are closely evolutionarily tied to bacterial endosymbiosis resulting in a more complicated form of cell death.

== Function ==
=== Nutrition ===
The main function of bacteriocytes is to indirectly provide nutrients to the insect through the use of symbionts. The microorganisms housed in these specialized cells produce essential nutrients for their hosts in exchange for an enclosed environment to live. The health of these endosymbionts is crucial for the host's biology as their presence changes the balance of amino acid metabolism and mitochondrial phosphorylation. Both of these processes are essential for insect flight ability and performance. Insects housing symbionts develop best when fed on a diet with a lower protein-to-carbohydrate ratio than other insects because the symbionts already add considerable amounts of amino acid and nitrogen nutrition to the host. Because of this nutritional imbalance, bacteriocytes are more prevalent in insects that utilize diets consisting of an excess of one compound while lacking some nutrients, like amino acids and proteins.

=== Other functions ===
While some endosymbionts directly provide their hosts with food, others secrete enzymes to help aid in digestion of materials the insect cannot break down itself such as wood. Additionally, some bacteriocyte endosymbionts serve an immune function are known to prime the immune system especially against trypanosomes.

== Examples ==
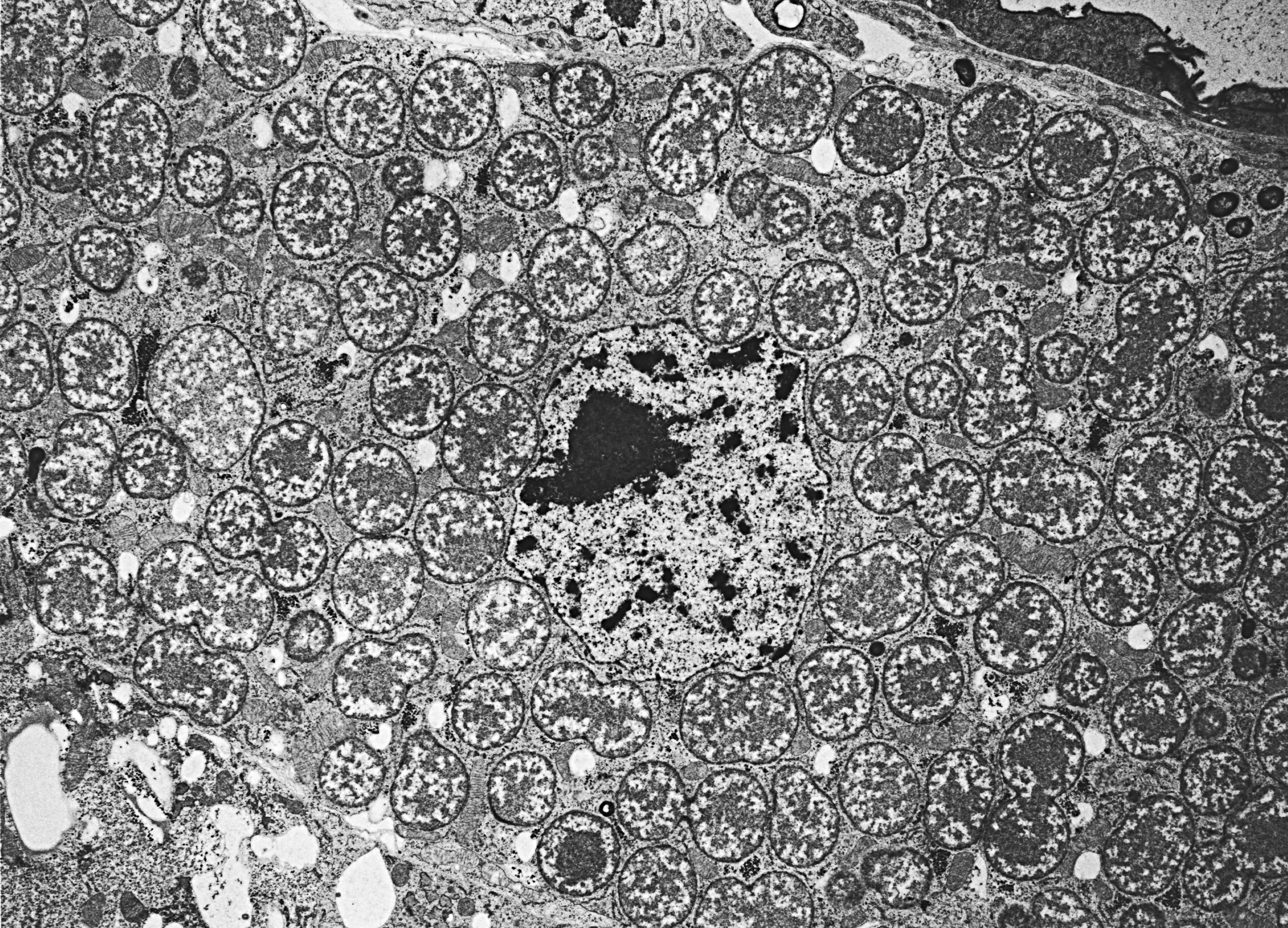
Symbionts (Buchnera aphidicola) within a bacteriocyte of a pea aphid (Acyrthosiphon pisum). The central object is the host nucleus; Buchnera cells are round and packed into the cytoplasm.

=== Aphids ===
Development of aphid (Acyrthosiphon pisum) bacteriocytes has been studied with the host cells that contain the endosymbiotic bacteria, Buchnera aphidicola. Bacteriocytes of aphids have a subpopulation of the bacteriocytes that is chosen prior to the maternal transmission of the bacteria to the embryo. Even later in the aphid's life, a second population of adipose cells are selected to become bacteriocytes. Bacteriocyte development has been maintained in aphids for 80–150 million years.

=== Tsetse flies ===
The Tsetse fly's most prominent and vital endosymbiont is the bacterium, Wigglesworthia glossinidia, These bacteria are housed in the fly's bacteriocytes and produce B vitamins (B1, B6, and B9). The Tsetse fly itself lacks the ability to obtain these nutrients because of its hematophagous diet. W. glossinidia population in the maternal milk glands also help prime the immune system during the larval stage. Tsetse flies with bacteriocytes containing W. glossinidia are less susceptible to trypanosome infection later in life.
