= Friends in Action =

Christian organization

FRIENDS in Action International
- Company type: Evangelical Missions Agency
- Founded: 1992
- Headquarters: Elizabethtown, PA
- Area served: Worldwide
- Key people: Tim Johnston, President
- Revenue: $1,212,118 in 2016
- Website: http://www.fiaintl.org

FRIENDS in Action global (FIA) is an Evangelical missionary organization that exists "to accelerate the work of proclaiming the Gospel to isolated people groups around the world that have not had the opportunity to hear the Good News of Jesus Christ." The organization's international headquarters is located in Elizabethtown, PA. FRIENDS has affiliates in the United Kingdom, Canada, and the USA.

== History ==
FIA was founded in 1992 as "FRIENDS of NTM"—a helper organization to New Tribes Mission. Initially, they focused primarily on promoting the ministries of that particular agency through support work such as well-drilling and the construction of airstrips in remote areas where missionaries were already working. Since then, FIA has developed a broader scope and now partners with any organization working toward its common goal.

== Strategy ==
FRIENDS' main areas of focus include missionary services, equipment projects, work teams, and sending missionaries. FIA networks with existing missionary works on the foreign field and with local churches both in the United States and abroad. They seek to equip those already involved in church planting ministries with the resources needed to continue such work. Their approach is largely project-based. Rather than taking up long-term residency in any particular area, FIA raises funds and sends short-term workers from North American churches to accomplish goals which missionaries and third-world churches would have difficulty achieving on their own.

Examples of such projects include "building of airstrips in remote jungle locations, building missionary homes and staff housing, drilling water wells where there is no good water source, as well as the construction of radio stations and the collection and distribution of dry goods such as seeds to be used in humanitarian projects on the foreign field. FIA has small full-time staff, instead relying upon volunteer work from churches throughout North America and Europe to provide most of the labor.

== Projects ==
The organization has ongoing projects in Bolivia, Moldova, Nicaragua (Miskito People), Nicaragua (Rama Cay), Papua New Guinea, West Africa and Vanuatu. They also have several US-based ministries which comprise over 800 homes throughout North America. These families have volunteered guest facilities in their houses to traveling missionaries home on furlough or on deputation headed to the foreign field.
