= Mycoplasma capricolum =

Scientific classification
- Domain: Bacteria
- Kingdom: Bacillati
- Phylum: Mycoplasmatota
- Class: Mollicutes
- Order: Mycoplasmatales
- Family: Mycoplasmataceae
- Genus: Mycoplasma
- Species: M. capricolum

Binomial name
- Mycoplasma capricolum Tully et al. 1974 (Approved Lists 1980)

Species of bacterium

Mycoplasma capricolum is a species of Mycoplasma bacteria. It is primarily a pathogen of goats, but has also been found in sheep and cows. The species requires external sources of cholesterol to grow or survive (which usually comes in the form of a natural fatty acid auxotroph), but the uptaken fatty acid is not used as a substrate for energy production but rather for phospholipid synthesis instead.

It (specifically the capripneumoniae subspecies) causes a disease in goats called contagious caprine pleuropneumonia (CCPP).
