= Bacteriome =

Specialized insect organ that hosts endosymbiotic bacteria

A bacteriome is a specialized organ, found mainly in some insects, that hosts endosymbiotic bacteria. Bacteriomes contain specialized cells, called bacteriocytes, that provide nutrients and shelter to the bacteria while protecting the host animal. In exchange, the bacteria provide essentials like vitamins and amino acids to the host insect. Bacteriomes also protect the bacteria from the host's immune system, with insects secreting antimicrobial peptides such as the coleoptericin secreted by weevils to keep bacteria within the bacteriome.

Some insects, like the glassy-winged sharpshooter, host more than one species of bacteria. In armored scale insects, bacteriomes have unique genetic and sexual properties. For example, they have five copies of each chromosome—including two copies of the mother's complete genome.

== See also ==
- Trophosome — organ found in some marine worms that contain symbiotic, chemosynthetic bacteria
