= Mycoplasma =

Genus of bacteria

Mycoplasmosis
- Specialty: Infectious disease

Mycoplasma
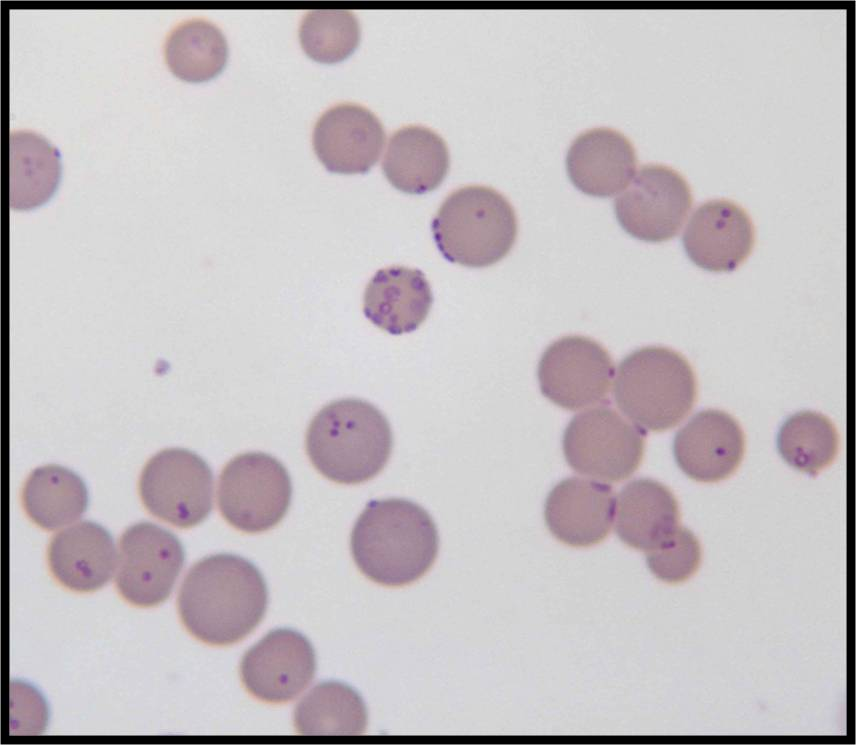
- Mycoplasma haemofelis

Scientific classification
- Domain: Bacteria
- Kingdom: Bacillati
- Phylum: Mycoplasmatota
- Class: Mollicutes
- Order: Mycoplasmatales
- Family: Mycoplasmataceae
- Genus: Mycoplasma; J.Nowak 1929

Type species
- Mycoplasma mycoides (Borrel et al. 1910) Freundt 1955 (Approved Lists 1980)

Species
- See text

Synonyms
- "Asterococcus" Borrel et al. 1910 non Scherffel 1908 non Borkhsenius 1960; "Asteromyces" Wroblewski 1931 non Moreau & Moreau ex Hennebert 1962; "Borrelomyces" Turner 1935; "Bovimyces" Sabin 1941; Haemobartonella Tyzzer & Weinman 1939; "Pleuropneumonia" Tulasne & Brisou 1955

Mycoplasma is a genus of bacteria that, like the other members of the class Mollicutes, lack a cell wall (peptidoglycan) around their cell membrane. The absence of peptidoglycan makes them naturally resistant to antibiotics such as the beta-lactam antibiotics that target cell wall synthesis. They can be parasitic or saprotrophic.

In casual speech, the name "mycoplasma" (plural mycoplasmas or mycoplasms) generally refers to all members of the class Mollicutes. In formal scientific classification, the designation Mycoplasma refers exclusively to the genus, a member of the Mycoplasmataceae, the only family in the order Mycoplasmatales (see "scientific classification"). In 2018, Mycoplasma was split with many clinically significant species moved to other genera in Mollicutes; see the page Mollicutes for an overview.

== Etymology ==
The term "mycoplasma", from the Greek μύκης, mykes (fungus) and πλάσμα, plasma (formed), was first used by Albert Bernhard Frank in 1889 to describe an altered state of plant cell cytoplasm resulting from infiltration by fungus-like microorganisms. Julian Nowak later proposed the name mycoplasma for certain filamentous microorganisms imagined to have both cellular and acellular stages in their lifecycles, which could explain how they were visible with a microscope, but passed through filters impermeable to other bacteria.

Later, the name for these mycoplasmas was pleuropneumonia-like organisms (PPLO), broadly referring to organisms similar in colonial morphology and filterability to the causative agent (a Mycoplasma species) of contagious bovine pleuropneumonia. At present, all these organisms are classified as Mollicutes, and the term Mycoplasma solely refers to the genus.

== Characteristics ==
Over 100 species were formerly included in the genus Mycoplasma, a member of the class Mollicutes. They are parasites or commensals of humans, animals, and plants. The genus Mycoplasma uses vertebrate and arthropod hosts. Dietary nitrogen availability has been shown to alter codon bias and genome evolution in Mycoplasma and the plant parasites Phytoplasma.

Mycoplasma species are among the smallest free-living organisms (about 0.2–0.3 μm in diameter). They have been found in the pleural cavities of cattle suffering from pleuropneumonia. These organisms are often called MLO (mycoplasma-like organisms) or, formerly, PPLO (pleuropneumonia-like organisms).

=== Important characteristics ===
1. Cell wall is absent and plasma membrane forms the outer boundary of the cell.
2. Due to the absence of cell walls these organisms can change their shape which leads to pleomorphism.
3. Lack of nucleus and other membrane-bound organelles.
4. Genetic material is a single DNA duplex and is naked.
5. Ribosomes are 70S type.
6. Possess a replicating disc at one end which assists replication process and also the separation of the genetic materials.
7. Heterotrophic nutrition. Some live as saprophytes but the majority are parasites of plants and animals. The parasitic nature is due to the inability of mycoplasmal bacteria to synthesise the required growth factor.

=== Cell and colony morphology ===
Due to the lack of a rigid cell wall, Mycoplasma species (like all Mollicutes) can contort into a broad range of shapes, from round to oblong. They are pleomorphic and therefore cannot be identified as rods, cocci or spirochetes.

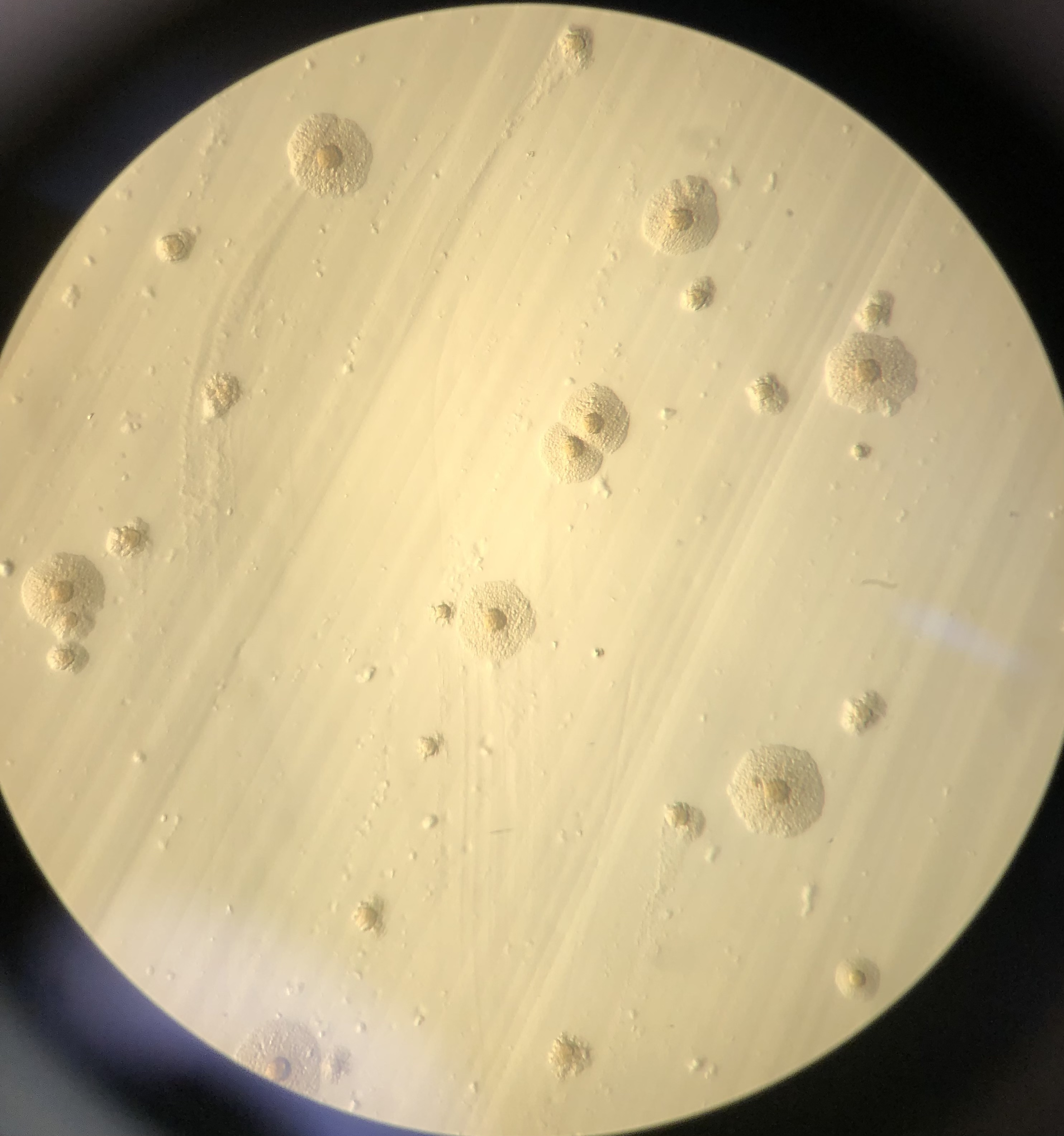
Colony morphology of Mycoplasma on Hayflick agar

Colonies show a typical "fried egg" appearance (about 0.5 mm in diameter).

=== Reproduction ===
In 1954, using phase-contrast microscopy, continual observations of live cells have shown that Mycoplasma species ("mycoplasmas", formerly called pleuropneumonia-like organisms, PPLO, now classified as Mollicutes) and L-form bacteria (previously also called L-phase bacteria) do not proliferate by binary fission, but by a uni- or multi-polar budding mechanism. Microphotograph series of growing microcultures of different strains of PPLOs, L-form bacteria and, as a control, a Micrococcus species (dividing by binary fission) have been presented. Additionally, electron microscopic studies have been performed.

== Taxonomy ==
=== History of taxonomy ===
Before 1980, Mycoplasma species (often commonly called "mycoplasmas", now classified as Mollicutes) were sometimes considered stable L-form bacteria or even viruses, but phylogenetic analysis has identified them as bacteria that have lost their cell walls in the course of evolution.

The medical and agricultural importance of members of the genus Mycoplasma and related genera have led to the extensive cataloging of many of these organisms by culture, serology, and small sub-unit rRNA gene and whole-genome sequencing. A recent focus in the sub-discipline of molecular phylogenetics has both clarified and confused certain aspects of the organization of the class Mollicutes.

Taxonomists once classified Mycoplasma and relatives in the phylum Firmicutes, consisting of low G+C Gram-positive bacteria such as Clostridium, Lactobacillus, and Streptococcus; but modern polyphasic analyses situate them in the phylum Tenericutes.

By the 1990s, it had become readily apparent that this approach was problematic: the type species, M. mycoides, along with other significant mycoplasma species like M. capricolum, is evolutionarily more closely related to the genus Spiroplasma in the order Entomoplasmatales than to the other members of the genus Mycoplasma. As a result, if the group was to be rearranged to match phylogeny, a number of medically important species (e.g. M. pneumoniae, M. genitalium) would have to be put in a different genus, causing widespread confusion in medical and agricultural communities. The genus was discussed multiple times by the International Committee on Systematic Bacteriology's (ICSB) subcommittee on Mollicutes between 1992 and 2011, to no effect.

Regardless of taxonomy, by 2007 it was solidly known that Molicutes could be divided into four nontaxonomic lineages.

- An "Acholeplasma" group consisting of Acholeplasmatales. This group is non-problematic, as it contains no species classified in what was then "Mycoplasma".
- A "Spiroplasma" or mycoides group containing M. mycoides and the aforementioned closely related species in "Spiroplasma" and Entomoplasmatales.
- A pneumoniae group containing M. pneumoniae and closely related species (M. muris, M. fastidiosum, U. urealyticum), the currently unculturable haemotrophic mollicutes, informally referred to as haemoplasmas (recently transferred from the genera Haemobartonella and Eperythrozoon), and Ureaplasma. This medically important group contains M. alvi (bovine), M. amphoriforme (human), M. gallisepticum (avian), M. genitalium (human), M. imitans (avian), M. pirum (uncertain/human), M. testudinis (tortoises), and M. pneumoniae (human). Most, if not all, of these species share some otherwise unique characteristics including an attachment organelle, homologs of the M. pneumoniae cytadherence-accessory proteins, and specialized modifications of the cell division apparatus.
- A hominis group containing M. hominis, M. bovis, and M. pulmonis among others.

=== As of 2018 ===
In 2018, Gupta et al. re-circumscribed the genus Mycoplasma around M. mycoides. A total of 78 species were removed from Mycoplasma, creating five new genera and a number of higher taxonomic levels. Under this new scheme, a new family Mycoplasmoidaceae was created to correspond to the "pneumoniae" group, with M. pneumoniae and related species transferred to a new genus Mycoplasmoides. Another new family Metamycoplasmataceae was created to correspond to the "hominis" group. Both families belong to a new order Mycoplasmoitales, distinct from the Mycoplasmatales of Mycoplasma. The taxonomy was accepted by the ICSB with validation list 184 in 2018 and became the correct name. Both List of Prokaryotic names with Standing in Nomenclature (LPSN) and National Center for Biotechnology Information (NCBI) now use the new nomenclature.

Gupta's proposed taxonomy, as expected, moved the medically important "pneumoniae" group out of Mycoplasma into its own genus. As a result, a number of mycoplasmologists petitioned to the ICSB to reject the name in 2019. They argue that although Gupta's phylogenetic methods were likely solid, the proposed name changes are too sweeping to be practically adopted, citing some principles of the Code such as "name stability". Gupta and Oren wrote a rebuttal in 2020, further detailing the pre-existing taxonomic problems. In 2022, the ICSP's Judicial Opinion 122 ruled in favor of the name changes proposed by Gupta, meaning they remain valid under the Prokaryotic Code (and for the purpose of the LPSN, they remain the "correct names"). However, the older names also remain valid; their use remains acceptable under the Code.

Gupta et al. 2019 performed some uncontroversial sorting of the order Mycoplasmatales.

Phylogenies of Mycoplasma sensu stricto/sensu Gupta
16S rRNA based LTP_10_2024

- Mycoplasma s.s.
  - - M. putrefaciens Tully et al. 1974
    - - M. cottewii Da Massa et al. 1994
      - M. yeatsii Da Massa et al. 1994
  - - M. capri (Edward 1953) Hudson, Cottew & Adler 1967 non El Nasri 1966
    - - M. mycoides (Borrel et al. 1910) Freundt 1955
      - - M. capricolum Tully et al. 1974
        - - M. capricolum capripneumoniae Leach, Erno & MacOwan 1993
          - M. leachii Manso-Silván et al. 2009

120 marker proteins based GTDB 09-RS220

- Mycoplasma s.s.
  - - M. putrefaciens
    - - M. cottewii
      - M. yeatsii
  - - M. feriruminatoris Fischer et al. 2015
    - - - M. capri
        - M. mycoides
      - - M. capricolum
        - M. leachii

=== Unassigned species ===
The GTDB and LTP phylogeny above does not include a number of names published under this genus that are either correct or pro-correct according to the LPSN. These species likely belong to a different genus under the standards of the 2018 reorganization, but has not been moved because a new combination has not been proposed, or because the new combination has not been made valid publication, or because the taxonomic opinion of the LPSN/LoRN refuses to use the new name as the correct name. The classification of LTP and GTDB is used here to assign a probable target genus.

Many new species have been proposed in Mycoplasma while disregarding the 2018 reorganization; see LPSN for a list. These will be included here and sorted by lineage eventually.

Hemotrophic mycoplasmas: This category includes species that should be moved to Eperythrozoon under the Gupta reorganization.

- "Ca. M. aoti" Barker et al. 2011
- "Ca. M. erythrocervae" Watanabe et al. 2010
- "Ca. M. haematobrackenitadaridae" Becker et al. 2025
- "Ca. M. haematocervi" corrig. Watanabe et al. 2010
- "Ca. M. haematodidelphidis" corrig. Messick et al. 2002
- "Ca. M. haematohominis" corrig. Millán et al. 2015
- "Ca. M. haematohydrochoeri" corrig. Vieira et al. 2021
- "Ca. M. haematomacacae" corrig. Maggi et al. 2013
- "Ca. M. haematominiopteri" corrig. Millán et al. 2015
- "Ca. M. haematomolossi" Becker et al. 2025
- "M. haematomyotis" Volokhov et al. 2023
- "Ca. M. haematonasuae" corrig. Collere et al. 2021
- "Ca. M. haematoparvum" Sykes et al. 2005
- "M. haematophyllostomi" Volokhov et al. 2023
- "Ca. M. haematoselmanitadaridae" Becker et al. 2025
- "Ca. M. haematosphigguri" corrig. Valente et al. 2021
- "Ca. M. haematotapirus" Mongruel et al. 2022
- "Ca. M. haematoterrestris" Mongruel et al. 2022
- "Ca. M. haematotraderitadaridae" Becker et al. 2025
- "Ca. M. haematovis" corrig. Hornok et al. 2009
- "Ca. M. haemobovis" Meli et al. 2010
- "Ca. M. haemomeles" Harasawa, Orusa & Giangaspero 2014
- "Ca. M. haemomuris" (Mayer 1921) Neimark et al. 2002
- "Ca. M. haemoparvum" Kenny et al. 2004
- "Ca. M. hemominiopterus" Millán et al. 2015

Nested in Mycoplasmoides:

- "M. bradburyae" Ramírez et al. 2023 – in GTDB

Nested in Mycoplasmopsis:

- M. hafezii Ziegler et al. 2019 – in LTP, close to Mycoplsmopsis alligatoris
- M. phocimorsus Skafte-Holm et al. 2023 – in LTP, close to "Mycoplasmopsis elephantis"

Synonimized before 2018 reorganization:

- "M. incognitus" Lo et al. 1989 → M. fermentans

Not in LTP/GTDB, some of which have a 16S in GenBank that can be used to assign the genus:

- "Ca. M. corallicola" Neulinger et al. 2009 – Mycoplsmopsis (among species mentioned in Gupta et al. (2018), "Mycoplsmopsis iguanae" was the highest 16S BLAST hit)
- "Ca. M. coregoni" corrig. Rasmussen et al. 2021
- "Ca. M. didelphidis" corrig. Pontarolo et al. 2021
- "M. insons" May et al. 2007
- "Ca. M. kahanei" Neimark et al. 2002
- "M. monodon" Ghadersohi & Owens 1998
- "M. pneumophila" Lyerova et al. 2008
- "Ca. M. ravipulmonis" Neimark, Mitchelmore & Leach 1998
- "Ca. M. salmoniarum" corrig. Rasmussen et al. 2021
- "M. sphenisci" Frasca et al. 2005
- "M. timone" Greub & Raoult 2001
- "Ca. M. tructae" Sanchez et al. 2020
- "Ca. M. turicense" corrig. Willi et al. 2006
- "M. volis" Dillehay et al. 1995
- "M. vulturii" Oaks et al. 2004

== Synthetic mycoplasma genome ==
A chemically synthesized genome of a mycoplasmal cell based entirely on synthetic DNA which can self-replicate has been referred to as Mycoplasma laboratorium. M. laboratorium serves as a model for a minimal genome, that is, a genome that is reduced to mostly essential genes.

== See also ==
- International Organization for Mycoplasmology (IOM)
- Sexually transmitted disease
- Vaginal flora
- Vaginal infection
- Vaginal disease
- Vaginal health
- Phytoplasma
- Smallest organisms
- List of bacterial orders
- List of bacteria genera
- Mycoplasma alligatori
