= Chryseobacterium echinoideorum =

Scientific classification
- Domain: Bacteria
- Kingdom: Pseudomonadati
- Phylum: Bacteroidota
- Class: Flavobacteriia
- Order: Flavobacteriales
- Family: Weeksellaceae
- Genus: Chryseobacterium
- Species: C. echinoideorum

Binomial name
- Chryseobacterium echinoideorum Lin et al. 2015

Species of bacterium

Chryseobacterium echinoideorum is a Gram-negative, rod-shaped, aerobic and non-motile bacteria from the genus Chryseobacterium which has been isolated from a sea urchin (Tripneustes gratilla) on the Penghu Island of Taiwan. Chryseobacterium echinoideorum produces flexirubin.
