= Chryseobacterium ginsengisoli =

Scientific classification
- Domain: Bacteria
- Kingdom: Pseudomonadati
- Phylum: Bacteroidota
- Class: Flavobacteriia
- Order: Flavobacteriales
- Family: Weeksellaceae
- Genus: Chryseobacterium
- Species: C. ginsengisoli

Binomial name
- Chryseobacterium ginsengisoli Nguyen et al. 2013

Type strain
- JCM 18019, KCTC 23760, DCY 63

Species of bacterium

Chryseobacterium ginsengisoli is a Gram-negative, strictly aerobic and non-motile bacteria from the genus Chryseobacterium which has been isolated from the rhizosphere of a ginseng plant.
