= Chryseobacterium daecheongense =

Scientific classification
- Domain: Bacteria
- Kingdom: Pseudomonadati
- Phylum: Bacteroidota
- Class: Flavobacteriia
- Order: Flavobacteriales
- Family: Weeksellaceae
- Genus: Chryseobacterium
- Species: C. daecheongense

Binomial name
- Chryseobacterium daecheongense Kim et al. 2005

Type strain
- BCRC 17457, CCRC 17457, CCUG 52896, CIP 110173, CPW406, DSM 15235, KACC 11395, KCTC 12088, NBRC 102008

Species of bacterium

Chryseobacterium daecheongense is a Gram-negative, non-spore-forming and non-motile bacteria from the genus Chryseobacterium which has been isolated from freshwater lake sediments.
