= Chryseobacterium taihuense =

Scientific classification
- Domain: Bacteria
- Kingdom: Pseudomonadati
- Phylum: Bacteroidota
- Class: Flavobacteriia
- Order: Flavobacteriales
- Family: Weeksellaceae
- Genus: Chryseobacterium
- Species: C. taihuense

Binomial name
- Chryseobacterium taihuense Wu et al. 2013

Type strain
- CGMCC 1.10941, NBRC 108747, THMBM1

Species of bacterium

Chryseobacterium taihuense is a Gram-negative, facultatively anaerobic and non-motile bacteria from the genus Chryseobacterium which has been isolated from the Lake Tai in Wuxi in China.
