= Chryseobacterium shigense =

Scientific classification
- Domain: Bacteria
- Kingdom: Pseudomonadati
- Phylum: Bacteroidota
- Class: Flavobacteriia
- Order: Flavobacteriales
- Family: Weeksellaceae
- Genus: Chryseobacterium
- Species: C. shigense

Binomial name
- Chryseobacterium shigense Shimomura et al. 2005

Type strain
- BAMY 1001, BCRC 17519, CCRC 17519, CIP 108958, DSM 17126, GUM-Kaji, LMG 23387, NCIMB 14047

Synonyms
- Chryseobacterium shigaense

Species of bacterium

Chryseobacterium shigense is a Gram-negative, strictly aerobic, rod-shaped and non-motile bacteria from the genus Chryseobacterium which has been isolated from a rainbow trout.
