= Chryseobacterium profundimaris =

Scientific classification
- Domain: Bacteria
- Kingdom: Pseudomonadati
- Phylum: Bacteroidota
- Class: Flavobacteriia
- Order: Flavobacteriales
- Family: Weeksellaceae
- Genus: Chryseobacterium
- Species: C. profundimaris

Binomial name
- Chryseobacterium profundimaris Xu et al. 2015

Type strain
- CGMCC 1.12663, DY46, JCM 19801

Species of bacterium

Chryseobacterium profundimaris is a Gram-negative, strictly aerobic, rod-shaped and non-motile bacteria from the genus Chryseobacterium which has been isolated from deep sea sediments from the Atlantic Ocean.
