= Chryseobacterium shandongense =

Scientific classification
- Domain: Bacteria
- Kingdom: Pseudomonadati
- Phylum: Bacteroidota
- Class: Flavobacteriia
- Order: Flavobacteriales
- Family: Weeksellaceae
- Genus: Chryseobacterium
- Species: C. shandongense

Binomial name
- Chryseobacterium shandongense Yang et al. 2015

Type strain
- CCTCC AB 2014060, YF-3, JCM 30154

Species of bacterium

Chryseobacterium shandongense is a Gram-negative, rod-shaped, non-spore-forming and non-motile bacteria from the genus Chryseobacterium which has been isolated from soil.
