= Chryseobacterium ginsenosidimutans =

Scientific classification
- Domain: Bacteria
- Kingdom: Pseudomonadati
- Phylum: Bacteroidota
- Class: Flavobacteriia
- Order: Flavobacteriales
- Family: Weeksellaceae
- Genus: Chryseobacterium
- Species: C. ginsenosidimutans

Binomial name
- Chryseobacterium ginsenosidimutans Im et al. 2011

Type strain
- CIP 110378, JCM 16719, KACC 14527, THG 15

Species of bacterium

Chryseobacterium ginsenosidimutans is a Gram-negative, strictly aerobic, non-spore-forming, rod-shaped, and non-motile bacteria from the genus Chryseobacterium which has been isolated from a field with Toxicodendron vernicifluum trees in Okcheon County in Korea.
