= Chryseobacterium aquifrigidense =

Scientific classification
- Domain: Bacteria
- Kingdom: Pseudomonadati
- Phylum: Bacteroidota
- Class: Flavobacteriia
- Order: Flavobacteriales
- Family: Weeksellaceae
- Genus: Chryseobacterium
- Species: C. aquifrigidense

Binomial name
- Chryseobacterium aquifrigidense Park et al. 2008

Type strain
- CIP 110377, CW9, JCM 14756, KCTC 12894

Species of bacterium

Chryseobacterium aquifrigidense is a non-motile bacteria from the genus Chryseobacterium which has been isolated from a water cooling system in Gwangyang in Korea.
