= Chryseobacterium gwangjuense =

Scientific classification
- Domain: Bacteria
- Kingdom: Pseudomonadati
- Phylum: Bacteroidota
- Class: Flavobacteriia
- Order: Flavobacteriales
- Family: Weeksellaceae
- Genus: Chryseobacterium
- Species: C. gwangjuense

Binomial name
- Chryseobacterium gwangjuense Park et al. 2013

Type strain
- KACC 16227, LMG 26579, THG-A18, Yi THG A18

Species of bacterium

Chryseobacterium gwangjuense is a Gram-negative, strictly aerobic, rod-shaped and non-motile bacteria from the genus Chryseobacterium which has been isolated from soil from the Gwangju province in Korea.
