= Chryseobacterium frigidum =

Scientific classification
- Domain: Bacteria
- Kingdom: Pseudomonadati
- Phylum: Bacteroidota
- Class: Flavobacteriia
- Order: Flavobacteriales
- Family: Weeksellaceae
- Genus: Chryseobacterium
- Species: C. frigidum

Binomial name
- Chryseobacterium frigidum Kim et al. 2016

Type strain
- CCTCC AB 2011160, KCTC 42897, D07

Species of bacterium

Chryseobacterium frigidum is a Gram-negative, aerobic and non-motile bacteria from the genus Chryseobacterium which has been isolated from high Arctic tundra soil near Ny-Ålesund in Norway.
