= Chryseobacterium scophthalmum =

Scientific classification
- Domain: Bacteria
- Kingdom: Pseudomonadati
- Phylum: Bacteroidota
- Class: Flavobacteriia
- Order: Flavobacteriales
- Family: Weeksellaceae
- Genus: Chryseobacterium
- Species: C. scophthalmum

Binomial name
- Chryseobacterium scophthalmum Vandamme et al. 1994

Type strain
- ATCC 700039, Austin 1, Austin MM1, BCRC 17334, CCM 4109, CCRC 17334, CCUG 33454, CIP 104199, DSM 16779, KCTC 2907, LMG 13028, MM1, NCIMB 13463, R-908

Synonyms
- Flavobacterium scophthalmum

Species of bacterium

Chryseobacterium scophthalmum is a Gram-negative and rod-shaped bacteria from the genus Chryseobacterium which has been isolated from the gills of a turbot (Scophthalmus maximus) in Scotland. Chryseobacterium scophthalmum produces flexirubin.
