= Chryseobacterium camelliae =

Scientific classification
- Domain: Bacteria
- Kingdom: Pseudomonadati
- Phylum: Bacteroidota
- Class: Flavobacteriia
- Order: Flavobacteriales
- Family: Weeksellaceae
- Genus: Chryseobacterium
- Species: C. camelliae

Binomial name
- Chryseobacterium camelliae Kook et al. 2014

Type strain
- JCM 18745, KACC 16985, THG C4-1

Species of Gram-negative, aerobic bacterium

Chryseobacterium camelliae is a Gram-negative, strictly aerobic, rod-shaped and non-motile bacteria from the genus Chryseobacterium which has been isolated from green tea in Jangheung-gun in Korea.
