= Chryseobacterium carnipullorum =

Scientific classification
- Domain: Bacteria
- Kingdom: Pseudomonadati
- Phylum: Bacteroidota
- Class: Flavobacteriia
- Order: Flavobacteriales
- Family: Weeksellaceae
- Genus: Chryseobacterium
- Species: C. carnipullorum

Binomial name
- Chryseobacterium carnipullorum Charimba et al. 2013

Type strain
- 9_R23581, DSM 25581, LMG 26732

Species of bacterium

Chryseobacterium carnipullorum is a Gram-negative, rod-shaped, non-spore-forming and non-motile bacteria from the genus Chryseobacterium which has been isolated from a raw chicken from a poultry processing plant in Bloemfontein in South Africa.
