= Chryseobacterium indologenes =

Scientific classification
- Domain: Bacteria
- Kingdom: Pseudomonadati
- Phylum: Bacteroidota
- Class: Flavobacteriia
- Order: Flavobacteriales
- Family: Weeksellaceae
- Genus: Chryseobacterium
- Species: C. indologenes

Binomial name
- Chryseobacterium indologenes Vandamme et al. 1994

Type strain
- AB 2095, ATCC 29897, BCRC 17271, CCM 4451, CCRC 17271, CCUG 14483, CCUG 14556, CDC 3716, CIP 101026, CIP 101826, DSM 16777, GIFU 1347, IFO 14944, KCTC 2905, LMG 12453, LMG 12454, LMG 8337, NBRC 14944, NCTC 10796, R-873, R. Hugh 542 T, VTT E-93496

Synonyms
- Flavobacterium indologenes

Species of bacterium

Chryseobacterium indologenes is a Gram-negative and non-motile bacteria from the genus Chryseobacterium which has been isolated from a human. Chryseobacterium indologenes is a pathogen of American bullfrogs (Lithobates catesbeianus) and humans.
