= Chryseobacterium flavum =

Scientific classification
- Domain: Bacteria
- Kingdom: Pseudomonadati
- Phylum: Bacteroidota
- Class: Flavobacteriia
- Order: Flavobacteriales
- Family: Weeksellaceae
- Genus: Chryseobacterium
- Species: C. flavum

Binomial name
- Chryseobacterium flavum Zhou et al. 2007

Type strain
- CCTCC AB 206147, CIP 109739, CW-E 2, KCTC 12877

Species of bacterium

Chryseobacterium flavum is a Gram-negative, rod-shaped and non-motile bacteria from the genus Chryseobacterium which has been isolated from polluted soil in the Jiangsu Province in China.
