= Chryseobacterium oranimense =

Scientific classification
- Domain: Bacteria
- Kingdom: Pseudomonadati
- Phylum: Bacteroidota
- Class: Flavobacteriia
- Order: Flavobacteriales
- Family: Weeksellaceae
- Genus: Chryseobacterium
- Species: C. oranimense

Binomial name
- Chryseobacterium oranimense Hantsis-Zacharov et al. 2008

Type strain
- CIP 109920, DSM 19055, H8, LMG 24030

Species of bacterium

Chryseobacterium oranimense is a Gram-negative psychrotolerant, proteolytic, lipolytic, rod-shaped and non-motile bacteria from the genus Chryseobacterium which has been isolated from raw cow milk in Israel.
