= Chryseobacterium piperi =

Scientific classification
- Domain: Bacteria
- Kingdom: Pseudomonadati
- Phylum: Bacteroidota
- Class: Flavobacteriia
- Order: Flavobacteriales
- Family: Weeksellaceae
- Genus: Chryseobacterium
- Species: C. piperi

Binomial name
- Chryseobacterium piperi Strahan et al. 2011

Type strain
- ATCC BAA-1782, CCUG 57707, CTM, DSM 22249, JCM 15960, KCTC 23267

Species of bacterium

Chryseobacterium piperi is a Gram-negative, rod-shaped and non-motile bacterium from the genus Chryseobacterium which has been isolated from the Loyalsock Creek in Montoursville in the United States.
