= Chryseobacterium molle =

Scientific classification
- Domain: Bacteria
- Kingdom: Pseudomonadati
- Phylum: Bacteroidota
- Class: Flavobacteriia
- Order: Flavobacteriales
- Family: Weeksellaceae
- Genus: Chryseobacterium
- Species: C. molle

Binomial name
- Chryseobacterium molle Herzog et al. 2008

Type strain
- CCUG 52547, CIP 110177, DSM 18016, DW3, LMG 25630

Species of bacterium

Chryseobacterium molle is a Gram-negative, rod-shaped, non-spore-forming and non-motile bacteria from the genus Chryseobacterium which has been isolated from biofilms of a beer bottling plant in Germany.
