= Chryseobacterium artocarpi =

Scientific classification
- Domain: Bacteria
- Kingdom: Pseudomonadati
- Phylum: Bacteroidota
- Class: Flavobacteriia
- Order: Flavobacteriales
- Family: Weeksellaceae
- Genus: Chryseobacterium
- Species: C. artocarpi

Binomial name
- Chryseobacterium artocarpi Venil et al. 2014

Type strain
- CECT 8497, KCTC 32509, UTM-3

Synonyms
- Chryseobacterium artocarpus

Species of bacterium

Chryseobacterium artocarpi is a Gram-negative and non-spore-forming bacteria from the genus Chryseobacterium which has been isolated from rhizosphere soil from the tree Artocarpus integer. Chryseobacterium artocarpi produces flexirubin.
