= Koreense =

Koreense may refer to:

- Chryseobacterium koreense, species of bacteria
- Microbacterium koreense, species of bacteria
- Penicillium koreense, species of fungus
- Phenylobacterium koreense, species of bacteria
- Pison koreense, species of wasp
- Planomicrobium koreense, species of bacteria
