= Chryseobacterium capnotolerans =

Scientific classification
- Domain: Bacteria
- Kingdom: Pseudomonadati
- Phylum: Bacteroidota
- Class: Flavobacteriia
- Order: Flavobacteriales
- Family: Weeksellaceae
- Genus: Chryseobacterium
- Species: C. capnotolerans

Binomial name
- Chryseobacterium capnotolerans Heidler von Heilborn et al. 2022

Species of bacterium

Chryseobacterium capnotolerans is a Gram-negative, rod-shaped species of bacteria, which has been isolated primarily from pork sausage packed under CO_{2}-enriched modified atmosphere. It is considered to be a potential food spoilage organism, which grows at elevated levels of CO_{2} of up to 40%. Its name derives from Greek kapnos (for "smoke", used in biology for carbon dioxide) and Latin tolerans (for "tolerating").

== Microbiologic characteristics ==
The species is cytochrome c oxidase-positive and catalase-positive, like other species from the genus Chryseobacterium. It grows on Tryptic soy agar at temperatures of 8 to 39 °C, tolerating NaCl concentrations of up to 4.5%. Cells of Chryseobacterium capnotolerans are non-motile and 2 μm by 0.8 μm in dimension. The cell membrane of this species is characterized by the presence of phosphatidylethanolamine and various ornithine lipids. Additionally, the rare polar lipids sulfobacin A, flavolipin and cytolipin, as well as a glycolipid, were detected. Another characteristic of the species is the presence of menaquinone 6 and the orange-colored pigment flexirubin, as described for the whole genus before.

== Genetics ==
The genome was fully-sequenced and uploaded at the NCBI database. It consists of 5.36 mega base pairs. The DNA G+C content is 35.51 mol%.
