= Chryseobacterium hispalense =

Scientific classification
- Domain: Bacteria
- Kingdom: Pseudomonadati
- Phylum: Bacteroidota
- Class: Flavobacteriia
- Order: Flavobacteriales
- Family: Weeksellaceae
- Genus: Chryseobacterium
- Species: C. hispalense

Binomial name
- Chryseobacterium hispalense Montero-Calasanz et al. 2013

Type strain
- AG13, CCUG 63019, DSM 25574

Species of bacterium

Chryseobacterium hispalense is a Gram-negative and non-motile bacteria from the genus Chryseobacterium which has been isolated from a rainwater pond in Spain. Chryseobacterium hispalense can promote plant growth.
