= Chryseobacterium yonginense =

Scientific classification
- Domain: Bacteria
- Kingdom: Pseudomonadati
- Phylum: Bacteroidota
- Class: Flavobacteriia
- Order: Flavobacteriales
- Family: Weeksellaceae
- Genus: Chryseobacterium
- Species: C. yonginense

Binomial name
- Chryseobacterium yonginense Joung and Joh 2011

Type strain
- CECT 7547 T, HMD1043 T, KCTC 22744

Species of bacterium

Chryseobacterium yonginense is a Gram-negative and non-motile bacteria from the genus Chryseobacterium which has been isolated from a mesotrophic artificial lake in Korea.
