= Chryseobacterium rigui =

Scientific classification
- Domain: Bacteria
- Kingdom: Pseudomonadati
- Phylum: Bacteroidota
- Class: Flavobacteriia
- Order: Flavobacteriales
- Family: Weeksellaceae
- Genus: Chryseobacterium
- Species: C. rigui

Binomial name
- Chryseobacterium rigui Park et al. 2013

Type strain
- CJ16, JCM 18078, KACC 16560

Species of bacterium

Chryseobacterium rigui is a Gram-negative, rod-shaped and non-motile bacteria from the genus Chryseobacterium.
