= Chryseobacterium ureilyticum =

Scientific classification
- Domain: Bacteria
- Kingdom: Pseudomonadati
- Phylum: Bacteroidota
- Class: Flavobacteriia
- Order: Flavobacteriales
- Family: Weeksellaceae
- Genus: Chryseobacterium
- Species: C. ureilyticum

Binomial name
- Chryseobacterium ureilyticum Herzog et al. 2008

Type strain
- CCUG 52546, CIP 110146, DSM 18017, F-Fue-04IIIaaaa, LMG 25629

Species of bacterium

Chryseobacterium ureilyticum is a Gram-negative, rod-shaped, non-spore-forming and non-motile bacteria from the genus Chryseobacterium which has been isolated from a steel surface of a beer bottling plant in Germany.
