= Chryseobacterium pallidum =

Scientific classification
- Domain: Bacteria
- Kingdom: Pseudomonadati
- Phylum: Bacteroidota
- Class: Flavobacteriia
- Order: Flavobacteriales
- Family: Weeksellaceae
- Genus: Chryseobacterium
- Species: C. pallidum

Binomial name
- Chryseobacterium pallidum Herzog et al. 2008

Type strain
- 26-3St2b, CCUG 52548, DSM 18015, LMG 25631

Species of bacterium

Chryseobacterium pallidum is a Gram-negative, rod-shaped, non-spore-forming and non-motile bacteria from the genus Chryseobacterium which has been isolated from a steel surface from a beer bottling plant in Germany.
