= Chryseobacterium angstadtii =

Scientific classification
- Domain: Bacteria
- Kingdom: Pseudomonadati
- Phylum: Bacteroidota
- Class: Flavobacteriia
- Order: Flavobacteriales
- Family: Weeksellaceae
- Genus: Chryseobacterium
- Species: C. angstadtii

Binomial name
- Chryseobacterium angstadtii Kirk et al. 2013

Type strain
- ATCC BAA-2160, KCTC 23297, KM, NRRL B-59516

Species of bacterium

Chryseobacterium angstadtii is a Gram-negative, rod-shaped and non-motile bacteria from the genus Chryseobacterium which has been isolated from a glass tank which contained several eastern newts (Notophthalmus viridescens).
