= Chryseobacterium gambrini =

Scientific classification
- Domain: Bacteria
- Kingdom: Pseudomonadati
- Phylum: Bacteroidota
- Class: Flavobacteriia
- Order: Flavobacteriales
- Family: Weeksellaceae
- Genus: Chryseobacterium
- Species: C. gambrini

Binomial name
- Chryseobacterium gambrini Herzog et al. 2008

Type strain
- 5-1St1a, CCUG 52549, CIP 110172, DSM 18014, LMG 25632

Species of bacterium

Chryseobacterium gambrini is a Gram-negative, rod-shaped, non-spore-forming and non-motile bacteria from the genus Chryseobacterium which has been isolated from biofilms of a steel surface from a beer bottling plant in Germany.
