= Weeksella virosa =

Scientific classification
- Domain: Bacteria
- Kingdom: Pseudomonadati
- Phylum: Bacteroidota
- Class: Flavobacteriia
- Order: Flavobacteriales
- Family: Weeksellaceae
- Genus: Weeksella
- Species: W. virosa

Binomial name
- Weeksella virosa Holmes et al. 1987

Bacterium

Weeksella virosa is a Gram-negative and aerobic bacterium from the genus of Weeksella which can cause infection in rare cases. Weeksella virosa occurs in the human genitourinary tract. W. virosa produces mucoid, slimy colonies with yellow-green pigment when grown on blood agar.
