= Chryseobacterium taklimakanense =

Scientific classification
- Domain: Bacteria
- Kingdom: Pseudomonadati
- Phylum: Bacteroidota
- Class: Flavobacteriia
- Order: Flavobacteriales
- Family: Weeksellaceae
- Genus: Chryseobacterium
- Species: C. taklimakanense

Binomial name
- Chryseobacterium taklimakanense Holmes et al. 2013

Type strain
- CCTCC AB 208154, NCTC 13490, NRRL B-51322, X-65

Synonyms
- Planobacterium taklimakanense

Species of bacterium

Chryseobacterium taklimakanense is a Gram-negative and rod-shaped bacteria from the genus Chryseobacterium.
