= Chryseobacterium lineare =

Scientific classification
- Domain: Bacteria
- Kingdom: Pseudomonadati
- Phylum: Bacteroidota
- Class: Flavobacteriia
- Order: Flavobacteriales
- Family: Weeksellaceae
- Genus: Chryseobacterium
- Species: C. lineare

Binomial name
- Chryseobacterium lineare Zhao et al. 2017

Type strain
- KCTC 52364, MCCC 1K02723, XC0022

Synonyms
- Chryseobacterium zhejiangensis

Species of bacterium

Chryseobacterium lineare is a Gram-negative, rod-shaped, aerobic and non-motile bacterium from the genus Chryseobacterium which has been isolated from freshwater from Zhejiang in China.
