= Psychroflexus salarius =

Scientific classification
- Domain: Bacteria
- Kingdom: Pseudomonadati
- Phylum: Bacteroidota
- Class: Flavobacteriia
- Order: Flavobacteriales
- Family: Flavobacteriaceae
- Genus: Psychroflexus
- Species: P. salarius

Binomial name
- Psychroflexus salarius Chun et al. 2014

Type strain
- DSM 25661, KACC 17063, MIC1008

Species of bacterium

Psychroflexus salarius is a Gram-negative, aerobic, moderately halophilic and non-motile bacteria from the genus of Psychroflexus which has been isolated from the Gomso salt pan in Buan County in Korea.
