= Psychroflexus halocasei =

Scientific classification
- Domain: Bacteria
- Kingdom: Pseudomonadati
- Phylum: Bacteroidota
- Class: Flavobacteriia
- Order: Flavobacteriales
- Family: Flavobacteriaceae
- Genus: Psychroflexus
- Species: P. halocasei

Binomial name
- Psychroflexus halocasei Seiler et al. 2012

Type strain
- CCUG 59705, LMG 25857, Seiler WCC 4520, WCC 4520, WS 4520

Species of bacterium

Psychroflexus halocasei is a Gram-negative, strictly aerobic, halophilic, rod-shaped and non-motile bacteria from the genus of Psychroflexus which has been isolated from the surface of cheese in Salzburg, Austria.
