= Chryseobacterium solani =

Scientific classification
- Domain: Bacteria
- Kingdom: Pseudomonadati
- Phylum: Bacteroidota
- Class: Flavobacteriia
- Order: Flavobacteriales
- Family: Weeksellaceae
- Genus: Chryseobacterium
- Species: C. solani

Binomial name
- Chryseobacterium solani Du et al. 2015

Type strain
- JCM 19456, KACC 17652, THG-EP9

Species of bacterium

Chryseobacterium solani is a Gram-negative, aerobic and rod-shaped bacteria from the genus Chryseobacterium which has been isolated from rhizosphere soil from the plant Solanum melongena in Pyeongtaek in Korea.
