= Chryseobacterium taiwanense =

Scientific classification
- Domain: Bacteria
- Kingdom: Pseudomonadati
- Phylum: Bacteroidota
- Class: Flavobacteriia
- Order: Flavobacteriales
- Family: Weeksellaceae
- Genus: Chryseobacterium
- Species: C. taiwanense

Binomial name
- Chryseobacterium taiwanense Tai et al. 2006

Species of bacterium

Chryseobacterium taiwanense is a bacterium. It is Gram-negative, rod-shaped, non-spore-forming, yellow-pigmented and its type strain is strain Soil-3-27(T) (=BCRC 17412(T)=IAM 15317(T)=LMG 23355(T)).
