= Chryseobacterium defluvii =

Scientific classification
- Domain: Bacteria
- Kingdom: Pseudomonadati
- Phylum: Bacteroidota
- Class: Flavobacteriia
- Order: Flavobacteriales
- Family: Weeksellaceae
- Genus: Chryseobacterium
- Species: C. defluvii

Binomial name
- Chryseobacterium defluvii Kämpfer et al. 2003

Species of bacterium

Chryseobacterium defluvii is a bacterium. It is Gram-negative, rod-shaped, non-spore-forming and yellow-pigmented, having been first isolated from wastewater, hence its name. Its type strain is B2^{T} (=DSM 14219^{T} =CIP 107207^{T}).
