= Chryseobacterium formosense =

Scientific classification
- Domain: Bacteria
- Kingdom: Pseudomonadati
- Phylum: Bacteroidota
- Class: Flavobacteriia
- Order: Flavobacteriales
- Family: Weeksellaceae
- Genus: Chryseobacterium
- Species: C. formosense

Binomial name
- Chryseobacterium formosense Young et al. 2004

Species of bacterium

Chryseobacterium formosense is a bacterium. It is gram-negative, rod-shaped, non-spore forming and yellow-pigmented. Its type strain is CC-H3-2^{T} (CCUG 49271^{T}, CIP 108367^{T}). It was first isolated from the rhizosphere of a specimen of Lactuca sativa.
