= Chryseobacterium limigenitum =

Scientific classification
- Domain: Bacteria
- Kingdom: Pseudomonadati
- Phylum: Bacteroidota
- Class: Flavobacteriia
- Order: Flavobacteriales
- Family: Weeksellaceae
- Genus: Chryseobacterium
- Species: C. limigenitum

Binomial name
- Chryseobacterium limigenitum Kämpfer et al. 2015

Type strain
- CCM 8594, SUR2, LMG 28734, ZIM B1019

Species of bacterium

Chryseobacterium limigenitum is a Gram-negative and rod-shaped bacteria from the genus Chryseobacterium which has been isolated from dehydrated sludge.
