= Chryseobacterium nepalense =

Scientific classification
- Domain: Bacteria
- Kingdom: Pseudomonadati
- Phylum: Bacteroidota
- Class: Flavobacteriia
- Order: Flavobacteriales
- Family: Weeksellaceae
- Genus: Chryseobacterium
- Species: C. nepalense

Binomial name
- Chryseobacterium nepalense Chaudhary and Kim 2017

Type strain
- JCM 31469, KACC 18907, KEMB 9005-411, strain C-5-3

Species of bacterium

Chryseobacterium nepalense is a Gram-negative, aerobic, rod-shaped and non-motile bacteria from the genus Chryseobacterium which has been isolated from oil-contaminated soil from Biratnagar in Nepal.
