= Weeksella massiliensis =

Scientific classification
- Domain: Bacteria
- Kingdom: Pseudomonadati
- Phylum: Bacteroidota
- Class: Flavobacteriia
- Order: Flavobacteriales
- Family: Weeksellaceae
- Genus: Weeksella
- Species: W. massiliensis

Binomial name
- Weeksella massiliensis Sankar et al. 2017

Type strain
- FF8

Bacterium

Weeksella massiliensis is a bacterium from the genus of Weeksella. Weeksella massiliensis has been isolated from the urine from a man with acute cystitis Weeksella massiliensis is a human pathogen.
