= Chryseobacterium hominis =

Scientific classification
- Domain: Bacteria
- Kingdom: Pseudomonadati
- Phylum: Bacteroidota
- Class: Flavobacteriia
- Order: Flavobacteriales
- Family: Weeksellaceae
- Genus: Chryseobacterium
- Species: C. hominis

Binomial name
- Chryseobacterium hominis Vaneechoutte et al. 2007

Type strain
- CCUG 52711, CIP 109415, DSM 22165, NF802

Synonyms Chryseobacterium pufferi
- Chryseobacterium arothri

Species of bacterium

Chryseobacterium hominis is a Gram-negative bacteria from the genus Chryseobacterium which has been isolated from blood from a patient in Belgium and from the fish Arothron hispidus.
