= Chryseobacterium culicis =

Scientific classification
- Domain: Bacteria
- Kingdom: Pseudomonadati
- Phylum: Bacteroidota
- Class: Flavobacteriia
- Order: Flavobacteriales
- Family: Weeksellaceae
- Genus: Chryseobacterium
- Species: C. culicis

Binomial name
- Chryseobacterium culicis Kämpfer et al. 2010

Type strain
- CCM 7716, CIP 110213, DSM 23031, LMG 25442, R-4-1A

Species of bacterium

Chryseobacterium culicis is a Gram-negative and rod-shaped bacteria from the genus Chryseobacterium which has been isolated from the midgut of the mosquito Culex quinquefasciatus in Raipur in the Chhattisgarh province in India.
