= Chryseobacterium jeonii =

Scientific classification
- Domain: Bacteria
- Kingdom: Pseudomonadati
- Phylum: Bacteroidota
- Class: Flavobacteriia
- Order: Flavobacteriales
- Family: Weeksellaceae
- Genus: Chryseobacterium
- Species: C. jeonii

Binomial name
- Chryseobacterium jeonii Kämpfer et al. 2009

Type strain
- AT1047, IMSNU 14049, JCM 12382, KCTC 12226

Synonyms
- Sejongia jeonii

Species of bacterium

Chryseobacterium jeonii is a bacterium from the genus Chryseobacterium which has been isolated from moss from the Antarctica.
