= Chryseobacterium humi =

Scientific classification
- Domain: Bacteria
- Kingdom: Pseudomonadati
- Phylum: Bacteroidota
- Class: Flavobacteriia
- Order: Flavobacteriales
- Family: Weeksellaceae
- Genus: Chryseobacterium
- Species: C. humi

Binomial name
- Chryseobacterium humi Pires et al. 2010

Species of bacterium

Chryseobacterium humi is a bacterium. It is rod-shaped, non-motile, aerobic, catalase- and oxidase-positive and forms yellow colonies. Its type strain is ECP37(T) (=LMG 24684(T) =NBRC 104927(T)) .
