= Chryseobacterium gallinarum =

Scientific classification
- Domain: Bacteria
- Kingdom: Pseudomonadati
- Phylum: Bacteroidota
- Class: Flavobacteriia
- Order: Flavobacteriales
- Family: Weeksellaceae
- Genus: Chryseobacterium
- Species: C. gallinarum

Binomial name
- Chryseobacterium gallinarum Kämpfer et al. 2014

Type strain
- 100, CCM 8493, LMG 27808

Species of bacterium

Chryseobacterium gallinarum is a Gram-negative and rod-shaped bacteria from the genus Chryseobacterium which has been isolated from the pharyngeal scrape of a chicken in Saxony-Anhalt in Germany. Chryseobacterium gallinarum has the ability to degrade keratin.
