= Chryseobacterium contaminans =

Scientific classification
- Domain: Bacteria
- Kingdom: Pseudomonadati
- Phylum: Bacteroidota
- Class: Flavobacteriia
- Order: Flavobacteriales
- Family: Weeksellaceae
- Genus: Chryseobacterium
- Species: C. contaminans

Binomial name
- Chryseobacterium contaminans Kämpfer et al. 2014

Type strain
- C26, CCM 8492, LMG 27810

Species of bacterium

Chryseobacterium contaminans is a Gram-negative and rod-shaped bacteria from the genus Chryseobacterium which has been isolated from a rhizosphere contamination from an agar plate in Alabama in the United States.
