= Chryseobacterium xixisoli =

Scientific classification
- Domain: Bacteria
- Kingdom: Pseudomonadati
- Phylum: Bacteroidota
- Class: Flavobacteriia
- Order: Flavobacteriales
- Family: Weeksellaceae
- Genus: Chryseobacterium
- Species: C. xixisoli

Binomial name
- Chryseobacterium xixisoli (Feng et al. 2014) Hahnke et al. 2017

Type strain
- CGMCC 1.12802, NBRC 110387, strain S31

Synonyms
- Epilithonimonas xixisoli

Species of bacterium

Chryseobacterium xixisoli is a Gram-negative, rod-shaped and non-motile bacteria from the genus Chryseobacterium which has been isolated from soil from the Xixi wetland in China.
