= Chryseobacterium arthrosphaerae =

Scientific classification
- Domain: Bacteria
- Kingdom: Pseudomonadati
- Phylum: Bacteroidota
- Class: Flavobacteriia
- Order: Flavobacteriales
- Family: Weeksellaceae
- Genus: Chryseobacterium
- Species: C. arthrosphaerae

Binomial name
- Chryseobacterium arthrosphaerae Kämpfer et al. 2010

Type strain
- CC-VM-7, CCM 7645, CCUG 57618, CIP 110186, DSM 22218

Species of bacterium

Chryseobacterium arthrosphaerae is a Gram-negative and rod-shaped bacteria from the genus Chryseobacterium which has been isolated from the faeces of the pill millipede Arthrosphaera magna in India.
