= Chryseobacterium joostei =

Scientific classification
- Domain: Bacteria
- Kingdom: Pseudomonadati
- Phylum: Bacteroidota
- Class: Flavobacteriia
- Order: Flavobacteriales
- Family: Weeksellaceae
- Genus: Chryseobacterium
- Species: C. joostei

Binomial name
- Chryseobacterium joostei Hugo et al. 2003

Type strain
- BCRC 17367, CCM 7154, CCRC 17367, CCUG 46665, CIP 105533, CIP-BACT 105533, DSM 16927, Ix 5a, KCTC 12128, LMG 18212

Synonyms
- Chryseobacterium joosteii

Species of bacterium

Chryseobacterium joostei is a bacterium from the genus Chryseobacterium which has been isolated from raw milk in Ixopo in Kwazulu-Natal in South Africa.
