= Chryseobacterium palustre =

Scientific classification
- Domain: Bacteria
- Kingdom: Pseudomonadati
- Phylum: Bacteroidota
- Class: Flavobacteriia
- Order: Flavobacteriales
- Family: Weeksellaceae
- Genus: Chryseobacterium
- Species: C. palustre

Binomial name
- Chryseobacterium palustre Pires et al. 2010

Species of bacterium

Chryseobacterium palustre is a bacterium. It is rod-shaped, non-motile, aerobic, catalase- and oxidase-positive and forms yellow colonies. Its type strain is 3A10(T) (=LMG 24685(T) =NBRC 104928(T)).
