= Chryseobacterium tenax =

Scientific classification
- Domain: Bacteria
- Kingdom: Pseudomonadati
- Phylum: Bacteroidota
- Class: Flavobacteriia
- Order: Flavobacteriales
- Family: Weeksellaceae
- Genus: Chryseobacterium
- Species: C. tenax

Binomial name
- Chryseobacterium tenax (O'Sullivan et al. 2006) Hahnke et al. 2017

Type strain
- DSM 16811, EP105, NCIMB 14026

Synonyms
- Epilithonimonas tenax

Species of bacterium

Chryseobacterium tenax is a bacterium from the genus Chryseobacterium which has been isolated from stones from the River Taff in Wales.
