= Chryseobacterium bernardetii =

Scientific classification
- Domain: Bacteria
- Kingdom: Pseudomonadati
- Phylum: Bacteroidota
- Class: Flavobacteriia
- Order: Flavobacteriales
- Family: Weeksellaceae
- Genus: Chryseobacterium
- Species: C. bernardetii

Binomial name
- Chryseobacterium bernardetii Holmes et al. 2013

Type strain
- CCUG 60564, CDC G229, CL318/82, NCTC 13530

Species of bacterium

Chryseobacterium bernardetii is a bacterium from the genus Chryseobacterium.
