= Psychroflexus salis =

Scientific classification
- Domain: Bacteria
- Kingdom: Pseudomonadati
- Phylum: Bacteroidota
- Class: Flavobacteriia
- Order: Flavobacteriales
- Family: Flavobacteriaceae
- Genus: Psychroflexus
- Species: P. salis

Binomial name
- Psychroflexus salis Zhong et al. 2016

Type strain
- CGMCC 1.12925, X15M-6, JCM 30615

Species of bacterium

Psychroflexus salis is a Gram-negative, strictly aerobic and non-motile bacteria from the genus of Psychroflexus which has been isolated from the Lake Xiaochaidan in the Qinghai Province in China. 5
