= Chryseobacterium geocarposphaerae =

Scientific classification
- Domain: Bacteria
- Kingdom: Pseudomonadati
- Phylum: Bacteroidota
- Class: Flavobacteriia
- Order: Flavobacteriales
- Family: Weeksellaceae
- Genus: Chryseobacterium
- Species: C. geocarposphaerae

Binomial name
- Chryseobacterium geocarposphaerae Kämpfer et al. 2014

Type strain
- 91A-561, CCM 8488, LMG 27811

Species of bacterium

Chryseobacterium geocarposphaerae is a Gram-negative and rod-shaped bacteria from the genus Chryseobacterium which has been isolated from soil around peanuts (Arachis hypogaea) in Alabama in the United States.
