= Chryseobacterium nematophagum =

Scientific classification
- Domain: Bacteria
- Kingdom: Pseudomonadati
- Phylum: Bacteroidota
- Class: Flavobacteriia
- Order: Flavobacteriales
- Family: Weeksellaceae
- Genus: Chryseobacterium
- Species: "C. nematophagum"

Binomial name
- "Chryseobacterium nematophagum" Page et al. 2019

Species of bacterium

"Chryseobacterium nematophagum" is a Gram-negative, aerobic and rod-shaped bacteria in the genus Chryseobacterium, which was first isolated from Caenorhabditis briggsae nematodes in rotting apples in France. It exhibits gliding motility. After ingestion by a nematode, they attack it from within, breaking down its extracellular matrices and killing it. In laboratory tests C. nematophagum infected and killed a wide variety of nematodes, including the model organism Caenorhabditis elegans, and the vertebrate parasites Ancylostoma caninum, Cooperia curtecei, Cooperia oncophera, Haemonchus contortus, Nippostrongylus brasiliensis, Ostertagia ostertagi, Parastrongyloides trichosura and Trichostrongylus vitrinus.
