= Chryseobacterium solincola =

Scientific classification
- Domain: Bacteria
- Kingdom: Pseudomonadati
- Phylum: Bacteroidota
- Class: Flavobacteriia
- Order: Flavobacteriales
- Family: Weeksellaceae
- Genus: Chryseobacterium
- Species: C. solincola

Binomial name
- Chryseobacterium solincola Benmalek et al. 2010

Type strain
- 1YB-R12, CCUG 55604, CIP 110201, DSM 22468

Species of bacterium

Chryseobacterium solincola is a Gram-negative, strictly aerobic halotolerant and psychrotolerant bacteria from the genus Chryseobacterium which has been isolated from soil which was polluted with hydrocarbon in Meftah in Algeria.
