= Chryseobacterium aahli =

Scientific classification
- Domain: Bacteria
- Kingdom: Pseudomonadati
- Phylum: Bacteroidota
- Class: Flavobacteriia
- Order: Flavobacteriales
- Family: Weeksellaceae
- Genus: Chryseobacterium
- Species: C. aahli

Binomial name
- Chryseobacterium aahli Loch and Faisal 2014

Type strain
- ATCC BAA-2540, Faisal T68, LMG 27338, T68

Species of bacterium

Chryseobacterium aahli is a Gram-negative bacteria from the genus Chryseobacterium which has been isolated from the kidney of the lake trout Salvelinus namaycush.
