= Chryseobacterium glaciei =

Scientific classification
- Domain: Bacteria
- Kingdom: Pseudomonadati
- Phylum: Bacteroidota
- Class: Flavobacteriia
- Order: Flavobacteriales
- Family: Weeksellaceae
- Genus: Chryseobacterium
- Species: C. glaciei

Binomial name
- Chryseobacterium glaciei Pal et al. 2018

Type strain
- JCM 31156, KACC 19170, MTCC 12457, IHBB 10212

Species of bacterium

Chryseobacterium glaciei is a Gram-negative, aerobic and non-spore-forming bacteria from the genus Chryseobacterium which has been isolated from the surface of a glacier near the Kunzum Pass in India.
