= Chryseobacterium vrystaatense =

Scientific classification
- Domain: Bacteria
- Kingdom: Pseudomonadati
- Phylum: Bacteroidota
- Class: Flavobacteriia
- Order: Flavobacteriales
- Family: Weeksellaceae
- Genus: Chryseobacterium
- Species: C. vrystaatense

Binomial name
- Chryseobacterium vrystaatense de Beer et al. 2005

Type strain
- BCRC 17509, CCRC 17509, CCUG 50970, CIP 108934, de Beer 161, LMG 22846, R-23566

Species of bacterium

Chryseobacterium vrystaatense is a Gram-negative bacteria from the genus Chryseobacterium which has been isolated from a raw chicken from a chicken processing plant in Vrystaat in South Africa.
