= Chryseobacterium soli =

Scientific classification
- Domain: Bacteria
- Kingdom: Pseudomonadati
- Phylum: Bacteroidota
- Class: Flavobacteriia
- Order: Flavobacteriales
- Family: Weeksellaceae
- Genus: Chryseobacterium
- Species: C. soli

Binomial name
- Chryseobacterium soli Weon et al. 2008

Species of bacterium

Chryseobacterium soli is a bacterium. It is aerobic, Gram-negative, non-motile, yellow-pigmented and straight rod-shaped. Its type strain is JS6-6(T) (=KACC 12502(T)=DSM 19298(T)).
