= Chryseobacterium cucumeris =

Scientific classification
- Domain: Bacteria
- Kingdom: Pseudomonadati
- Phylum: Bacteroidota
- Class: Flavobacteriia
- Order: Flavobacteriales
- Family: Weeksellaceae
- Genus: Chryseobacterium
- Species: C. cucumeris

Binomial name
- Chryseobacterium cucumeris Jeong et al. 2017

Type strain
- JCM 31422, KACC 18798, strain GSE06

Synonyms
- Chryseobacterium gunsanese

Species of bacterium

Chryseobacterium cucumeris is a Gram-negative bacteria from the genus Chryseobacterium which has been isolated from a cucumber from Gunsan in Korea.
