= Chryseobacterium tructae =

Scientific classification
- Domain: Bacteria
- Kingdom: Pseudomonadati
- Phylum: Bacteroidota
- Class: Flavobacteriia
- Order: Flavobacteriales
- Family: Weeksellaceae
- Genus: Chryseobacterium
- Species: C. tructae

Binomial name
- Chryseobacterium tructae Zamora et al. 2013

Type strain
- 1084-08, CCUG 60111, CECT 7798

Synonyms
- Chryseobacterium plurextorum

Species of bacterium

Chryseobacterium tructae is a Gram-negative and rod-shaped bacteria from the genus Chryseobacterium which has been isolated from the rainbow trout Oncorhynchus mykiss.
