= Chryseobacterium soldanellicola =

Scientific classification
- Domain: Bacteria
- Kingdom: Pseudomonadati
- Phylum: Bacteroidota
- Class: Flavobacteriia
- Order: Flavobacteriales
- Family: Weeksellaceae
- Genus: Chryseobacterium
- Species: C. soldanellicola

Binomial name
- Chryseobacterium soldanellicola Park et al. 2006

Type strain
- KCTC 12382, NBRC 100864, PSD1-4

Species of bacterium

Chryseobacterium soldanellicola is a Gram-negative bacteria from the genus Chryseobacterium which has been isolated from roots of the plant Calystegia soldanella in Tae-an in Korea.
