= Chryseobacterium endophyticum =

Scientific classification
- Domain: Bacteria
- Kingdom: Pseudomonadati
- Phylum: Bacteroidota
- Class: Flavobacteriia
- Order: Flavobacteriales
- Family: Weeksellaceae
- Genus: Chryseobacterium
- Species: C. endophyticum

Binomial name
- Chryseobacterium endophyticum Lin et al. 2017

Type strain
- BCRC 80938, JCM 31226, CC-YTH209

Species of bacterium

Chryseobacterium endophyticum is a Gram-negative, aerobic and endophytic bacteria from the genus Chryseobacterium which has been isolated from a leaf of a maize plant.
