= Chryseobacterium piscium =

Scientific classification
- Domain: Bacteria
- Kingdom: Pseudomonadati
- Phylum: Bacteroidota
- Class: Flavobacteriia
- Order: Flavobacteriales
- Family: Weeksellaceae
- Genus: Chryseobacterium
- Species: C. piscium

Binomial name
- Chryseobacterium piscium de Beer et al. 2006

Type strain
- CCUG 51923, CIP 109277, de Beer F20, LMG 23089, R-23621, Vandamme R-23621, VTT E-072685

Species of bacterium

Chryseobacterium piscium is a bacterium from the genus Chryseobacterium which has been isolated from a fish from the South Atlantic Ocean off the coast of South Africa
