= Chryseobacterium carnis =

Scientific classification
- Domain: Bacteria
- Kingdom: Pseudomonadati
- Phylum: Bacteroidota
- Class: Flavobacteriia
- Order: Flavobacteriales
- Family: Weeksellaceae
- Genus: Chryseobacterium
- Species: C. carnis

Binomial name
- Chryseobacterium carnis Holmes et al. 2013

Type strain
- CCUG 60559, CDC G81, CL88/78, Hayes B19/1, NCTC 13525

Chryseobacterium carnis is a Gram-negative bacteria from the genus Chryseobacterium.
