= Chryseobacterium rhizosphaerae =

Scientific classification
- Domain: Bacteria
- Kingdom: Pseudomonadati
- Phylum: Bacteroidota
- Class: Flavobacteriia
- Order: Flavobacteriales
- Family: Weeksellaceae
- Genus: Chryseobacterium
- Species: C. rhizosphaerae

Binomial name
- Chryseobacterium rhizosphaerae Cho et al. 2011

Species of bacterium

Chryseobacterium rhizosphaerae is a bacterial species found in the rhizospheres of coastal sand dune plants. It is Gram-negative, non-spore-forming and non-motile. Its type strain is RSB3-1^{T} (=KCTC 22548^{T} =NBRC 105248^{T}).
