= Moheibacter sediminis =

Scientific classification
- Domain: Bacteria
- Kingdom: Pseudomonadati
- Phylum: Bacteroidota
- Class: Flavobacteriia
- Order: Flavobacteriales
- Family: Weeksellaceae
- Genus: Moheibacter
- Species: M. sediminis

Binomial name
- Moheibacter sediminis Zhang et al. 2014

Type strain
- M0116

Bacterium

Moheibacter sediminis is a Gram-negative and strictly aerobic bacterium from the genus of Moheibacter which has been isolated from sediments from the Mohe Basin in China.
