= Chryseobacterium halperniae =

Scientific classification
- Domain: Bacteria
- Kingdom: Pseudomonadati
- Phylum: Bacteroidota
- Class: Flavobacteriia
- Order: Flavobacteriales
- Family: Weeksellaceae
- Genus: Chryseobacterium
- Species: C. halperniae

Binomial name
- Chryseobacterium halperniae (Shaked et al. 2010) Hahnke et al. 2017

Type strain
- DSM 19921, LMG 24401, train H1

Synonyms
- Epilithonimonas lactis

Species of bacterium

Chryseobacterium halperniae is a Gram-negative, rod-shaped, aerobic and non-motile bacteria from the genus Chryseobacterium which has been isolated from raw cow milk in Israel.
