= Chryseobacterium antarcticum =

Scientific classification
- Domain: Bacteria
- Kingdom: Pseudomonadati
- Phylum: Bacteroidota
- Class: Flavobacteriia
- Order: Flavobacteriales
- Family: Weeksellaceae
- Genus: Chryseobacterium
- Species: C. antarcticum

Binomial name
- Chryseobacterium antarcticum Kämpfer et al. 2009

Type strain
- AT1013, IMSNU 14040, JCM 12381, KCTC 12225

Synonyms
- Sejongia antarctica

Species of bacterium

Chryseobacterium antarcticum is a bacterium from the genus Chryseobacterium which has been isolated from soil in the Antarctica.
