= Chryseobacterium daeguense =

Scientific classification
- Domain: Bacteria
- Kingdom: Pseudomonadati
- Phylum: Bacteroidota
- Class: Flavobacteriia
- Order: Flavobacteriales
- Family: Weeksellaceae
- Genus: Chryseobacterium
- Species: C. daeguense

Binomial name
- Chryseobacterium daeguense Yoon et al. 2007

Type strain
- CIP 110016, DSM 19388, JCM 14362, K105, KCTC 12841

Species of bacterium

Chryseobacterium daeguense is a Gram-negative and rod-shaped bacteria from the genus Chryseobacterium which has been isolated from wastewater from a textile dye works in Daegu in Korea.
