= Chryseobacterium hispanicum =

Scientific classification
- Domain: Bacteria
- Kingdom: Pseudomonadati
- Phylum: Bacteroidota
- Class: Flavobacteriia
- Order: Flavobacteriales
- Family: Weeksellaceae
- Genus: Chryseobacterium
- Species: C. hispanicum

Binomial name
- Chryseobacterium hispanicum Gallego et al. 2006

Type strain
- CCM 7359, CECT 7129, CIP 109356, JCM 13554, KCTC 22104, VP48

Species of bacterium

Chryseobacterium hispanicum is a bacterium from the genus Chryseobacterium which has been isolated from a drinking water distribution system in Sevilla in Spain.
