= Chryseobacterium wanjuense =

Scientific classification
- Domain: Bacteria
- Kingdom: Pseudomonadati
- Phylum: Bacteroidota
- Class: Flavobacteriia
- Order: Flavobacteriales
- Family: Weeksellaceae
- Genus: Chryseobacterium
- Species: C. wanjuense

Binomial name
- Chryseobacterium wanjuense Weon et al. 2006

Type strain
- CIP 110181, DSM 17724, KACC 11468, R-2 A10-2

Species of bacterium

Chryseobacterium wanjuense is a bacterium from the genus Chryseobacterium which has been isolated from greenhouse soil, which was cultivated with Lactuca sativa, in the Wanju Province in Korea.
