= Chryseobacterium reticulitermitis =

Scientific classification
- Domain: Bacteria
- Kingdom: Pseudomonadati
- Phylum: Bacteroidota
- Class: Flavobacteriia
- Order: Flavobacteriales
- Family: Weeksellaceae
- Genus: Chryseobacterium
- Species: C. reticulitermitis

Binomial name
- Chryseobacterium reticulitermitis Zhao et al. 2017

Type strain
- CCTCC AB 2015431, KCTC 52230, strain Ra1

Species of bacterium

Chryseobacterium reticulitermitis is a Gram-negative, aerobic rod-shaped and non-motile bacteria from the genus Chryseobacterium which has been isolated from the gut of the termite Reticulitermes aculabialis.
