= Moheibacter stercoris =

Scientific classification
- Domain: Bacteria
- Kingdom: Pseudomonadati
- Phylum: Bacteroidota
- Class: Flavobacteriia
- Order: Flavobacteriales
- Family: Weeksellaceae
- Genus: Moheibacter
- Species: M. stercoris

Binomial name
- Moheibacter stercoris Schauss et al. 2016

Type strain
- 784B1_12E-Caso

Bacterium

Moheibacter stercoris is a Gram-negative and rod-shaped bacterium from the genus of Moheibacter which has been isolated from a biogas plant from Germany.
