= Psychroflexus salinarum =

Scientific classification
- Domain: Bacteria
- Kingdom: Pseudomonadati
- Phylum: Bacteroidota
- Class: Flavobacteriia
- Order: Flavobacteriales
- Family: Flavobacteriaceae
- Genus: Psychroflexus
- Species: P. salinarum

Binomial name
- Psychroflexus salinarum Yoon et al. 2009

Type strain
- CCUG 56752, KCTC 22483, ISL-14

Species of bacterium

Psychroflexus salinarum is a Gram-negative, rod-shaped and non-motile bacteria from the genus of Psychroflexus which has been isolated from the Yellow Sea in Korea.
