= Chryseobacterium kwangjuense =

Scientific classification
- Domain: Bacteria
- Kingdom: Pseudomonadati
- Phylum: Bacteroidota
- Class: Flavobacteriia
- Order: Flavobacteriales
- Family: Weeksellaceae
- Genus: Chryseobacterium
- Species: C. kwangjuense

Binomial name
- Chryseobacterium kwangjuense Sang et al. 2013

Type strain
- JCM 15904, KACC 13029, KJ1R5

Species of bacterium

Chryseobacterium kwangjuense is a Gram-negative and rod-shaped bacteria from the genus Chryseobacterium which has been isolated from the root of a pepper plant Capsicum annuum in Kwangju in Korea.
