= Chryseobacterium montanum =

Scientific classification
- Domain: Bacteria
- Kingdom: Pseudomonadati
- Phylum: Bacteroidota
- Class: Flavobacteriia
- Order: Flavobacteriales
- Family: Weeksellaceae
- Genus: Chryseobacterium
- Species: C. montanum

Binomial name
- Chryseobacterium montanum Guo et al. 2016

Type strain
- CCTCC AB 2016058, KCTC 52204, WG4

Species of bacterium

Chryseobacterium montanum is a Gram-negative, strictly aerobic, non-spore-forming and rod-shaped bacterium from the genus Chryseobacterium which has been isolated from soil from the Tianmen Mountain in China.
