= Chryseobacterium caeni =

Scientific classification
- Domain: Bacteria
- Kingdom: Pseudomonadati
- Phylum: Bacteroidota
- Class: Flavobacteriia
- Order: Flavobacteriales
- Family: Weeksellaceae
- Genus: Chryseobacterium
- Species: C. caeni

Binomial name
- Chryseobacterium caeni Quan et al. 2007

Type strain
- CCBAU 10201, CIP 109625, DSM 17710, KCTC 12506, N4

Species of bacterium

Chryseobacterium caeni is a Gram-negative and non-spore-forming bacteria from the genus Chryseobacterium which has been isolated from bioreactor sludge in Daejeon in Korea.
