= Chryseobacterium takakiae =

Scientific classification
- Domain: Bacteria
- Kingdom: Pseudomonadati
- Phylum: Bacteroidota
- Class: Flavobacteriia
- Order: Flavobacteriales
- Family: Weeksellaceae
- Genus: Chryseobacterium
- Species: C. takakiae

Binomial name
- Chryseobacterium takakiae Zhao et al. 2015

Type strain
- CGMCC 1.10941, THMBM1, NBRC 108747

Species of bacterium

Chryseobacterium takakiae is a Gram-negative, rod-shaped and non-spore-forming bacteria from the genus Chryseobacterium which has been isolated from the moss Takakia lepidozioides from the Gawalong glacier in Tibet in China.
