= Chryseobacterium chaponense =

Scientific classification
- Domain: Bacteria
- Kingdom: Pseudomonadati
- Phylum: Bacteroidota
- Class: Flavobacteriia
- Order: Flavobacteriales
- Family: Weeksellaceae
- Genus: Chryseobacterium
- Species: C. chaponense

Binomial name
- Chryseobacterium chaponense Kämpfer et al. 2011

Type strain
- CCM 7737, CIP 110405, DSM 23145, Sa 1147-06

Species of bacterium

Chryseobacterium chaponense is a Gram-negative, aerobic and rod-shaped bacteria from the genus of Chryseobacterium which has been isolated from the salmon Salmo salar from the Lake Chapo in Chile.
