= Chryseobacterium haifense =

Scientific classification
- Domain: Bacteria
- Kingdom: Pseudomonadati
- Phylum: Bacteroidota
- Class: Flavobacteriia
- Order: Flavobacteriales
- Family: Weeksellaceae
- Genus: Chryseobacterium
- Species: C. haifense

Binomial name
- Chryseobacterium haifense Hantsis-Zacharov and Halpern 2007

Type strain
- CIP 110174, DSM 19056, H38, LMG 24029

Synonyms
- Chryseobacterium haifaeyi

Species of bacterium

Chryseobacterium haifense is a psychrotolerant bacteria from the genus Chryseobacterium which has been isolated from raw milk in Israel.
