= Psychroflexus planctonicus =

Scientific classification
- Domain: Bacteria
- Kingdom: Pseudomonadati
- Phylum: Bacteroidota
- Class: Flavobacteriia
- Order: Flavobacteriales
- Family: Flavobacteriaceae
- Genus: Psychroflexus
- Species: P. planctonicus

Binomial name
- Psychroflexus planctonicus Zhong et al. 2016

Type strain
- CGMCC 1.12931, JCM 30616, X15M-8

Species of bacterium

Psychroflexus planctonicus is a Gram-negative, strictly aerobic, moderately halophilic, and non-motile bacteria from the genus of Psychroflexus which has been isolated from the Lake Xiaochaidan in Qaidam Basin in the Qinghai Province in China.
