= Riemerella anatipestifer =

Scientific classification
- Domain: Bacteria
- Kingdom: Pseudomonadati
- Phylum: Bacteroidota
- Class: Flavobacteriia
- Order: Flavobacteriales
- Family: Weeksellaceae
- Genus: Riemerella
- Species: R. anatipestifer

Binomial name
- Riemerella anatipestifer (Hendrickson and Hilbert 1932) Segers et al. 1993

Synonyms
- Moraxella anatipestifer Pasteurella anapestifer Pasteurella anatipestifer

Species of bacterium

Riemerella anatipestifer is a member of the Flavobacteriaceae family. It is a Gram-negative bacterium that causes septicaemia and death in young ducks and geese throughout the world. There are 21 known serotypes and infection is spread horizontally between birds. Infection may be referred to as duck septicaemia, goose flu, riemerellosis, new duck disease and polyserositis.

== Clinical signs and diagnosis ==
Clinical signs are most commonly seen in birds between the ages of 1–8 weeks old.

Systemic infection is most common, producing a variety of clinical signs. These include diarrhoea, pyrexia, anorexia, stunted growth, respiratory signs (e.g. coughing), neurological abnormalities (e.g. convulsions), and ocular signs. These signs are rapidly followed by death in many birds. Infection may localise in chronic cases.

On post-mortem, a yellow-white exudate and congestion can be seen throughout the body.

The signs seen on clinical exam and postmortem are normally sufficient to make a presumptive diagnosis. This diagnosis can be confirmed using laboratory tests such as bacterial culture, PCR and ELISA.

== Treatment and control ==
Antibiotics are the treatment of choice. The type of antibiotic selected should be determined by licensing and sensitivity testing.

Both a live and inactivated vaccines are available to control the disease. Good husbandry is also an essential part of disease prevention.
