= Chryseobacterium indoltheticum =

Scientific classification
- Domain: Bacteria
- Kingdom: Pseudomonadati
- Phylum: Bacteroidota
- Class: Flavobacteriia
- Order: Flavobacteriales
- Family: Weeksellaceae
- Genus: Chryseobacterium
- Species: C. indoltheticum

Binomial name
- Chryseobacterium indoltheticum Vandamme et al. 1994

Type strain
- ATCC 27950, BCRC 17333, CCM 4452, CCRC 17333, CCUG 33445, CIP 103168, DSM 16778, F37, KCTC 2920, LMG 4025, NCIMBT, NCIMB 2220, NCMB 2220, R-906

Synonyms
- Flavobacterium indoltheticum; Beneckea indolthetica; Chryseobacterium indolitheticum

Species of bacterium

Chryseobacterium indoltheticum is a bacterium from the genus Chryseobacterium which has been isolated from marine mud.
