= Chryseobacterium aurantiacum =

Scientific classification
- Domain: Bacteria
- Kingdom: Pseudomonadati
- Phylum: Bacteroidota
- Class: Flavobacteriia
- Order: Flavobacteriales
- Family: Weeksellaceae
- Genus: Chryseobacterium
- Species: C. aurantiacum

Binomial name
- Chryseobacterium aurantiacum Luo et al. 2018

Type strain
- F30 KCTC 62135; MCCC 1K03457

Bacterium in the family Flavobacteriaceae

Chryseobacterium aurantiacum is a bacterium from the genus Chryseobacterium which has been isolated from a Murray cod pisciculture pond.
