= Chryseobacterium anthropi =

Scientific classification
- Domain: Bacteria
- Kingdom: Pseudomonadati
- Phylum: Bacteroidota
- Class: Flavobacteriia
- Order: Flavobacteriales
- Family: Weeksellaceae
- Genus: Chryseobacterium
- Species: C. anthropi

Binomial name
- Chryseobacterium anthropi Kämpfer et al. 2009

Type strain
- CCUG 52764, CIP 109762, CCUG 15260, CCUG 52762

Species of bacterium

Chryseobacterium anthropi is a Gram-negative bacteria from the genus Chryseobacterium.
