= Chryseobacterium lactis =

Scientific classification
- Domain: Bacteria
- Kingdom: Pseudomonadati
- Phylum: Bacteroidota
- Class: Flavobacteriia
- Order: Flavobacteriales
- Family: Weeksellaceae
- Genus: Chryseobacterium
- Species: C. lactis

Binomial name
- Chryseobacterium lactis Holmes et al. 2013

Type strain
- A140/68, CCUG 60566, CDC KC1864, NCTC 11390, F68

Species of bacterium

Chryseobacterium lactis is a Gram-negative bacteria from the genus Chryseobacterium.
