= Chryseobacterium psychrotolerans =

Scientific classification
- Domain: Bacteria
- Kingdom: Pseudomonadati
- Phylum: Bacteroidota
- Class: Flavobacteriia
- Order: Flavobacteriales
- Family: Weeksellaceae
- Genus: Chryseobacterium
- Species: C. psychrotolerans

Binomial name
- Chryseobacterium psychrotolerans (Ge et al. 2015) Hahnke et al. 2017

Type strain
- CCTCC AB 207182, NRRL B-51307, strain TSBY 57

Synonyms
- Epilithonimonas psychrotolerans

Species of bacterium

Chryseobacterium psychrotolerans is a gram-negative, non-spore-forming and non-motile bacteria from the genus Chryseobacterium which has been isolated from the permafrost of the Tianshan Mountains.
