= Chryseobacterium lathyri =

Scientific classification
- Domain: Bacteria
- Kingdom: Pseudomonadati
- Phylum: Bacteroidota
- Class: Flavobacteriia
- Order: Flavobacteriales
- Family: Weeksellaceae
- Genus: Chryseobacterium
- Species: C. lathyri

Binomial name
- Chryseobacterium lathyri Cho et al. 2011

Species of bacterium

Chryseobacterium lathyri is a bacterial species found in the rhizospheres of coastal sand dune plants. It is Gram-negative, non-spore-forming and non-motile. Its type strain is RBA2-6^{T} (=KCTC 22544^{T} =NBRC 105250^{T}).
