= Chryseobacterium luteum =

Scientific classification
- Domain: Bacteria
- Kingdom: Pseudomonadati
- Phylum: Bacteroidota
- Class: Flavobacteriia
- Order: Flavobacteriales
- Family: Weeksellaceae
- Genus: Chryseobacterium
- Species: C. luteum

Binomial name
- Chryseobacterium luteum Behrendt et al. 2007

Type strain
- CIP 109792, DSM 18605, LMG 23785, P 456/04

Bacterium in the family Flavobacteriaceae

Chryseobacterium luteum is a bacterium from the genus Chryseobacterium which has been isolated from the phyllosphere of grasses in Paulinenaue in Brandenburg in Germany.
