= Chryseobacterium marinum =

Scientific classification
- Domain: Bacteria
- Kingdom: Pseudomonadati
- Phylum: Bacteroidota
- Class: Flavobacteriia
- Order: Flavobacteriales
- Family: Weeksellaceae
- Genus: Chryseobacterium
- Species: C. marinum

Binomial name
- Chryseobacterium marinum Kämpfer et al. 2009

Type strain
- KCCM 42689, NBRC 103143, IMCC3228

Synonyms
- Sejongia marina

Species of bacterium

Chryseobacterium marinum is a bacterium from the genus Chryseobacterium.
