= Chryseobacterium arachidiradicis =

Scientific classification
- Domain: Bacteria
- Kingdom: Pseudomonadati
- Phylum: Bacteroidota
- Class: Flavobacteriia
- Order: Flavobacteriales
- Family: Weeksellaceae
- Genus: Chryseobacterium
- Species: C. arachidiradicis

Binomial name
- Chryseobacterium arachidiradicis Kämpfer et al. 2015

Type strain
- CCM 8490, CIP 110647, 91A-612, LMG 27814

Species of bacterium

Chryseobacterium arachidiradicis is a Gram-negative and rod-shaped bacteria from the genus Chryseobacterium which has been isolated from soil around a peanut (Arachis hypogaea) in Alabama in the United States.
