= Chryseobacterium hungaricum =

Scientific classification
- Domain: Bacteria
- Kingdom: Pseudomonadati
- Phylum: Bacteroidota
- Class: Flavobacteriia
- Order: Flavobacteriales
- Family: Weeksellaceae
- Genus: Chryseobacterium
- Species: C. hungaricum

Binomial name
- Chryseobacterium hungaricum Szoboszlay et al. 2008

Type strain
- CHB-20p, CIP 110178, DSM 19684, NCAIM B2269

Species of bacterium

Chryseobacterium hungaricum is a bacterium from the genus Chryseobacterium which has been isolated from soil which was contaminated with hydrocarbon in Tököl in Hungary.
