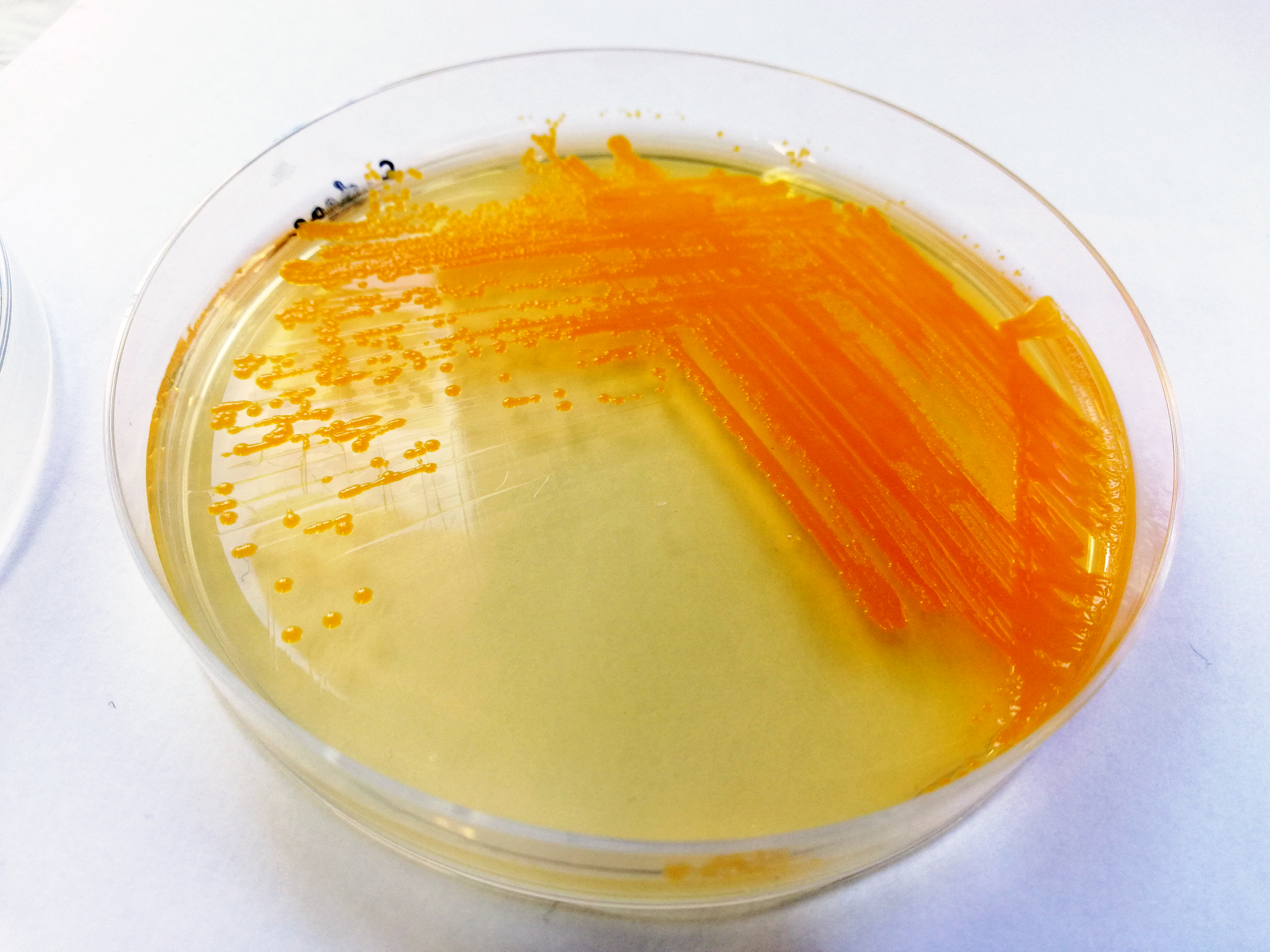
- Chryseobacterium oleae DSM25575 bacteria grown on solid LB media

Scientific classification
- Domain: Bacteria
- Kingdom: Pseudomonadati
- Phylum: Bacteroidota
- Class: Flavobacteriia
- Order: Flavobacteriales
- Family: Weeksellaceae
- Genus: Chryseobacterium
- Species: C. oleae

Binomial name
- Chryseobacterium oleae Montero-Calasanz et al. 2014

Type strain
- CCUG 63020, CT348, DSM 25575

= Chryseobacterium oleae =

Chryseobacterium oleae is a bacterium from the genus Chryseobacterium which has been isolated from the rhizosphere of the olive tree Olea europaea in Seville in Spain. Chryseobacterium oleae can promote the plant growth.
