= Riemerella columbipharyngis =

Scientific classification
- Domain: Bacteria
- Kingdom: Pseudomonadati
- Phylum: Bacteroidota
- Class: Flavobacteriia
- Order: Flavobacteriales
- Family: Weeksellaceae
- Genus: Riemerella
- Species: R. columbipharyngis

Binomial name
- Riemerella columbipharyngis Rubbenstroth et al. 2013

Type strain
- 8151

Synonyms
- Riemerella columbipharyngeale

Bacterium

Riemerella columbipharyngis is a bacterium from the genus of Riemerella which has been isolated from the pharynx of a domestic pigeon.
