= Chryseobacterium nakagawai =

Scientific classification
- Domain: Bacteria
- Kingdom: Pseudomonadati
- Phylum: Bacteroidota
- Class: Flavobacteriia
- Order: Flavobacteriales
- Family: Weeksellaceae
- Genus: Chryseobacterium
- Species: C. nakagawai

Binomial name
- Chryseobacterium nakagawai Holmes et al. 2013

Type strain
- CCUG 60563, CDC G41, NCTC 13529, NCTC 13529, n F91

Species of bacterium

Chryseobacterium nakagawai is a Gram-negative bacteria from the genus Chryseobacterium.
