= Chryseobacterium polytrichastri =

Scientific classification
- Domain: Bacteria
- Kingdom: Pseudomonadati
- Phylum: Bacteroidota
- Class: Flavobacteriia
- Order: Flavobacteriales
- Family: Weeksellaceae
- Genus: Chryseobacterium
- Species: C. polytrichastri

Binomial name
- Chryseobacterium polytrichastri Chen et al. 2015

Type strain
- CGMCC 1.12491, YG4-6, DSM 26899

Species of bacterium

Chryseobacterium polytrichastri is a Gram-negative, rod-shaped and non-spore-forming bacteria from the genus Chryseobacterium which has been isolated from the moss Polytrichastrum formosum from the Gawalong glacier from Tibet in China.
