= Riemerella columbina =

Scientific classification
- Domain: Bacteria
- Kingdom: Pseudomonadati
- Phylum: Bacteroidota
- Class: Flavobacteriia
- Order: Flavobacteriales
- Family: Weeksellaceae
- Genus: Riemerella
- Species: R. columbina

Binomial name
- Riemerella columbina Vancanneyt et al. 1999

Bacterium

Riemerella columbina is a Gram-negative bacterium from the genus of Riemerella which can cause respiratory disease in pigeons.

R. columbina is naturally competent to undergo genetic transformation during growth, especially during the logarithmic phase. R. columbina preferentially takes up its own genomic DNA rather than heterologous DNA.
