= Chryseobacterium piscicola =

Scientific classification
- Domain: Bacteria
- Kingdom: Pseudomonadati
- Phylum: Bacteroidota
- Class: Flavobacteriia
- Order: Flavobacteriales
- Family: Weeksellaceae
- Genus: Chryseobacterium
- Species: C. piperi

Binomial name
- Chryseobacterium piperi Ilardi et al. 2009

Type strain
- CECT 7357, CIP 110179, DSM 21068, VQ-6316s

Species of bacterium

Chryseobacterium piscicola is a Gram-negative, rod-shaped and non-motil bacteria from the genus Chryseobacterium which has been isolated from the salmon Salmo salar from the Los Lagos Region in Chile.
