= Chryseobacterium taichungense =

Scientific classification
- Domain: Bacteria
- Kingdom: Pseudomonadati
- Phylum: Bacteroidota
- Class: Flavobacteriia
- Order: Flavobacteriales
- Family: Weeksellaceae
- Genus: Chryseobacterium
- Species: C. taichungense

Binomial name
- Chryseobacterium taichungense Shen et al. 2005

Type strain
- CCUG 50001, CIP 108519, CC-TWGS1-8

Species of bacterium

Chryseobacterium taichungense is a Gram-negative, rod-shaped and non-spore-forming bacteria from the genusChryseobacterium which has been isolated from soil which was contaminated with tar in Taichung in Taiwan.
