= Chryseobacterium ginsengiterrae =

Scientific classification
- Domain: Bacteria
- Kingdom: Pseudomonadati
- Phylum: Bacteroidota
- Class: Flavobacteriia
- Order: Flavobacteriales
- Family: Weeksellaceae
- Genus: Chryseobacterium
- Species: C. ginsengiterrae

Binomial name
- Chryseobacterium ginsengiterrae (Hoang et al. 2015) Hahnke et al. 2017

Type strain
- CM 19896, KCTC 32174, DCY78, DCY68

Synonyms
- Epilithonimonas ginsengisoli

Species of bacterium

Chryseobacterium ginsengiterrae is a Gram-negative, rod-shaped, aerobic and non-motile bacteria from the genus Chryseobacterium which has been isolated from soil from a ginseng field.
