= Chryseobacterium frigidisoli =

Scientific classification
- Domain: Bacteria
- Kingdom: Pseudomonadati
- Phylum: Bacteroidota
- Class: Flavobacteriia
- Order: Flavobacteriales
- Family: Weeksellaceae
- Genus: Chryseobacterium
- Species: C. frigidisoli

Binomial name
- Chryseobacterium frigidisoli Bajerski et al. 2013

Type strain
- DSM 26000, LMG 27025, PB4

Synonyms
- Chryseobacterium solifrigidense

Species of bacterium

Chryseobacterium frigidisoli is a Gram-negative, rod-shaped, psychrotolerant and aerobic bacteria from the genus Chryseobacterium which has been isolated from the permafrost of a glacier from the Larsemann Hills in Antarctica.
