= Chryseobacterium zeae =

Scientific classification
- Domain: Bacteria
- Kingdom: Pseudomonadati
- Phylum: Bacteroidota
- Class: Flavobacteriia
- Order: Flavobacteriales
- Family: Weeksellaceae
- Genus: Chryseobacterium
- Species: C. zeae

Binomial name
- Chryseobacterium zeae Kämpfer et al. 2014

Type strain
- CCM 8491, JM-1085, LMG 27809

Species of bacterium

Chryseobacterium zeae is a Gram-negative and rod-shaped bacteria from the genus Chryseobacterium which has been isolated from stem from a sweet corn plant (Zea mays) in Macon County in the United States.
