= C. bovis =

C. bovis may refer to:

- Corynebacterium bovis, a pathogenic veterinary bacterium that causes mastitis and pyelonephritis in cattle
- Cryptosporidium bovis, a bacterium species in the genus Cryptosporidium
- Chryseobacterium bovis, a bacterium species
- Cyclaspis bovis, a crustacean species in the genus Cyclaspis

== See also ==
- Bovis (disambiguation)
