= Chryseobacterium vietnamense =

Scientific classification
- Domain: Bacteria
- Kingdom: Pseudomonadati
- Phylum: Bacteroidota
- Class: Flavobacteriia
- Order: Flavobacteriales
- Family: Weeksellaceae
- Genus: Chryseobacterium
- Species: C. vietnamense

Binomial name
- Chryseobacterium vietnamense Li and Zhu 2012

Type strain
- CCTCC M 209230, GIMN1.005, NRRL B-59550

Species of bacterium

Chryseobacterium vietnamense is a Gram-negative and strictly aerobic bacteria from the genus Chryseobacterium which has been isolated from forest soil in Vietnam.
