= Chryseobacterium arachidis =

Scientific classification
- Domain: Bacteria
- Kingdom: Pseudomonadati
- Phylum: Bacteroidota
- Class: Flavobacteriia
- Order: Flavobacteriales
- Family: Weeksellaceae
- Genus: Chryseobacterium
- Species: C. arachidis

Binomial name
- Chryseobacterium arachidis Kämpfer et al. 2014

Type strain
- 91A-593, CCM 8489 T, LMG 27813

Species of bacterium

Chryseobacterium arachidis is a Gram-negative and rod-shaped bacteria from the genus Chryseobacterium which has been isolated from a rhizosphere environment.
