= Chryseobacterium sediminis =

Scientific classification
- Domain: Bacteria
- Kingdom: Pseudomonadati
- Phylum: Bacteroidota
- Class: Flavobacteriia
- Order: Flavobacteriales
- Family: Weeksellaceae
- Genus: Chryseobacterium
- Species: C. sediminis

Binomial name
- Chryseobacterium sediminis Kampfer et al. 2015

Type strain
- CIP 110895, IMT-174, LMG 28695

Species of bacterium

Chryseobacterium sediminis is a Gram-negative and rod-shaped bacteria from the genus Chryseobacterium which has been isolated from river sediments in Guyana.
