= Chryseobacterium jejuense =

Scientific classification
- Domain: Bacteria
- Kingdom: Pseudomonadati
- Phylum: Bacteroidota
- Class: Flavobacteriia
- Order: Flavobacteriales
- Family: Weeksellaceae
- Genus: Chryseobacterium
- Species: C. jejuense

Binomial name
- Chryseobacterium jejuense Weon et al. 2008

Species of bacterium

Chryseobacterium jejuense is a bacterium. It is aerobic, Gram-negative, non-motile, yellow-pigmented and straight rod-shaped. Its type strain is JS17-8(T) (=KACC 12501(T)=DSM 19299(T)).
