= Psychroflexus sediminis =

Scientific classification
- Domain: Bacteria
- Kingdom: Pseudomonadati
- Phylum: Bacteroidota
- Class: Flavobacteriia
- Order: Flavobacteriales
- Family: Flavobacteriaceae
- Genus: Psychroflexus
- Species: P. sediminis

Binomial name
- Psychroflexus sediminis Chen et al. 2009

Type strain
- CCTCC AA 207030, KCTC 22166, YIM C238

Species of bacterium

Psychroflexus sediminis is a Gram-negative, mesophilic, slightly halophilic and non-motile bacteria from the genus of Psychroflexus which has been isolated from a salt lake in Qaidam Basin in China.
