= Chryseobacterium treverense =

Scientific classification
- Domain: Bacteria
- Kingdom: Pseudomonadati
- Phylum: Bacteroidota
- Class: Flavobacteriia
- Order: Flavobacteriales
- Family: Weeksellaceae
- Genus: Chryseobacterium
- Species: C. treverense

Binomial name
- Chryseobacterium treverense Yassin et al. 2010

Type strain
- CCUG 57657, CIP 110413, DSM 22251, IMMIB L-1519

Species of bacterium

Chryseobacterium treverense is a Gram-negative bacteria from the genus Chryseobacterium which has been isolated from human blood in Trier in Germany.
