= Chryseobacterium gleum =

Scientific classification
- Domain: Bacteria
- Kingdom: Pseudomonadati
- Phylum: Bacteroidota
- Class: Flavobacteriia
- Order: Flavobacteriales
- Family: Weeksellaceae
- Genus: Chryseobacterium
- Species: C. gleum

Binomial name
- Chryseobacterium gleum (Holmes et al. 1984) Vandamme et al. 1994

Type strain
- ATCC 35910, BCRC 17270, CCRC 17270, CCUG 14555, CIP 103039, CL4/79, DSM 16776, F93, Holmes CL 4/79, IFO 15054, JCM 2410, KCTC 2904, LMG 12447, LMG 8334, NBRC 15054, NCIMB 13462, NCTC 11432, Owen F93, R-875

Synonyms
- Flavobacterium gleum

Species of bacterium

Chryseobacterium gleum is a bacterium from the genus Chryseobacterium which has been isolated from a high vaginal swab from a human in London in England. Chryseobacterium gleum can cause infections in humans.
