= Chryseobacterium bovis =

Scientific classification
- Domain: Bacteria
- Kingdom: Pseudomonadati
- Phylum: Bacteroidota
- Class: Flavobacteriia
- Order: Flavobacteriales
- Family: Weeksellaceae
- Genus: Chryseobacterium
- Species: C. bovis

Binomial name
- Chryseobacterium bovis Hantsis-Zacharov et al. 2008

Type strain
- CIP 110170, DSM 19482, H9, LMG 24227

Species of bacterium

Chryseobacterium bovis is a Gram-negative, rod-shaped, aerobic and non-motile bacteria from the genus Chryseobacterium which has been isolated from raw cow milk in Israel.
