= Chryseobacterium salipaludis =

Scientific classification
- Domain: Bacteria
- Kingdom: Pseudomonadati
- Phylum: Bacteroidota
- Class: Flavobacteriia
- Order: Flavobacteriales
- Family: Weeksellaceae
- Genus: Chryseobacterium
- Species: C. salipaludis

Binomial name
- Chryseobacterium salipaludis Divyasree et al. 2018

Type strain
- KCTC 52835, LMG 30048, strain JC490

Species of bacterium

Chryseobacterium salipaludis is a Gram-negative, aerobic, rod-shaped and non-motile bacteria from the genus Chryseobacterium which has been isolated from sediments from the Indian Wild Ass Sanctuary in India.
