= Chryseobacterium rhizoplanae =

Scientific classification
- Domain: Bacteria
- Kingdom: Pseudomonadati
- Phylum: Bacteroidota
- Class: Flavobacteriia
- Order: Flavobacteriales
- Family: Weeksellaceae
- Genus: Chryseobacterium
- Species: C. rhizoplanae

Binomial name
- Chryseobacterium rhizoplanae Kämpfer et al. 2015

Type strain
- CCM 8544, CIP 110828, JM-534, LMG 28481

Species of bacterium

Chryseobacterium rhizoplanae is a Gram-negative and rod-shaped bacterium from the genus Chryseobacterium which has been isolated from the rhizoplane environment of a field with maize (Zea mays) in Tallassee in the United States.
