= Chryseobacterium gregarium =

Scientific classification
- Domain: Bacteria
- Kingdom: Pseudomonadati
- Phylum: Bacteroidota
- Class: Flavobacteriia
- Order: Flavobacteriales
- Family: Weeksellaceae
- Genus: Chryseobacterium
- Species: C. gregarium

Binomial name
- Chryseobacterium gregarium Behrendt et al. 2008

Type strain
- CIP 110171, DSM 19109, LMG 24052, P 461/12

Species of bacterium

Chryseobacterium gregarium is a bacterium from the genus Chryseobacterium which has been isolated from plant material.
