= Chryseobacterium oncorhynchi =

Scientific classification
- Domain: Bacteria
- Kingdom: Pseudomonadati
- Phylum: Bacteroidota
- Class: Flavobacteriia
- Order: Flavobacteriales
- Family: Weeksellaceae
- Genus: Chryseobacterium
- Species: C. oncorhynchi

Binomial name
- Chryseobacterium oncorhynchi Zamora et al. 2012

Type strain
- 701B-08, CCUG 60105, CECT 7794

Species of bacterium

Chryseobacterium oncorhynchi is a Gram-negative and rod-shaped bacteria from the genus Chryseobacterium which has been isolated from the trout Oncorhynchus mykiss.
