= Chryseobacterium xinjiangense =

Scientific classification
- Domain: Bacteria
- Kingdom: Pseudomonadati
- Phylum: Bacteroidota
- Class: Flavobacteriia
- Order: Flavobacteriales
- Family: Weeksellaceae
- Genus: Chryseobacterium
- Species: C. xinjiangense

Binomial name
- Chryseobacterium xinjiangense Zhao et al. 2011

Type strain
- CCTCC AB 207183, NRRL B-51308, TSBY 67

Species of bacterium

Chryseobacterium xinjiangense is a bacterium from the genus Chryseobacterium. It has been isolated from the alpine permafrost of the Tianshan Mountains in China.
