= Chryseobacterium viscerum =

Scientific classification
- Domain: Bacteria
- Kingdom: Pseudomonadati
- Phylum: Bacteroidota
- Class: Flavobacteriia
- Order: Flavobacteriales
- Family: Weeksellaceae
- Genus: Chryseobacterium
- Species: C. viscerum

Binomial name
- Chryseobacterium viscerum Zamora et al. 2012

Type strain
- 687B-08, CCUG 60103, CECT 7793, CECT 7845

Synonyms
- Chryseobacterium piscis

Species of bacterium

Chryseobacterium viscerum is a Gram-negative and rod-shaped bacteria from the genus Chryseobacterium which has been isolated from the gills and livers from rainbow trouts.
