= Chryseobacterium taeanense =

Scientific classification
- Domain: Bacteria
- Kingdom: Pseudomonadati
- Phylum: Bacteroidota
- Class: Flavobacteriia
- Order: Flavobacteriales
- Family: Weeksellaceae
- Genus: Chryseobacterium
- Species: C. taeanense

Binomial name
- Chryseobacterium taeanense Park et al. 2006

Type strain
- CCUG 52900, CIP 109195, DSM 17071, KCTC 12381, LMG 24043, NBRC 100863, PHA3-4

Synonyms
- Chryseobacterium halotolerans

Species of bacterium

Chryseobacterium taeanense is a Gram-negative bacteria from the genus Chryseobacterium which has been isolated from the roots of the plant Elymus mollis near Tae-an in Korea.
