= Weeksella =

Scientific classification
- Domain: Bacteria
- Kingdom: Pseudomonadati
- Phylum: Bacteroidota
- Class: Flavobacteriia
- Order: Flavobacteriales
- Family: Weeksellaceae
- Genus: Weeksella; Holmes et al. 1987

Species
- W. massiliensis W. virosa

Bacterium

Weeksella is a Gram-negative, aerobic and non-motile genus of bacteria from the family of Weeksellaceae. Strains from the species Weeksella occurs in the female genital tract and male genital tract.
