= Dokdonia donghaensis =

Scientific classification
- Domain: Bacteria
- Kingdom: Pseudomonadati
- Phylum: Bacteroidota
- Class: Flavobacteriia
- Order: Flavobacteriales
- Family: Flavobacteriaceae
- Genus: Dokdonia
- Species: D. donghaensis

Binomial name
- Dokdonia donghaensis Yoon et al. 2005

Species of bacterium

Dokdonia donghaensis is a strictly aerobic, gram-negative, phototrophic bacterium that thrives in marine environments. The organism can grow at a broad range of temperatures on seawater media. It has the ability to form biofilms, which increases the organism's resistance to antimicrobial agents, such as tetracycline.

== Discovery and isolation ==
Dokdonia donghaensis was discovered and isolated from the Sea of Japan in Korea from an island called Dokdo, a Korean name for the Liancourt Rocks which sovereignty is disputed between Japan and Korea; the date of isolation is not specified. Phylogenetic analysis of the 16S ribosomal RNA gene sequence of the organism revealed two closely related strains, DSW-1T and DSW-21. These strains are classified in Cytophaga-Flavobacterium-Bacteroides (CFB) group, which are dominant genera in marine environments. Winogradsky first described Cytophaga-like bacteria as unicellular, gliding, non-spore-formers, and Gram-negative rods, although the shape varies. Many Cytophaga-like bacterial colonies have pigment due to flexirubin-type pigments that are only found in these bacteria and flavobacteria. Cytophaga–Flavobacteria are chemoorganotrophs and are able to degrade biopolymers like chitin and cellulose.

== Morphology and genome ==
D. donghaensis is a gram-negative bacterium that is rod-shaped, nonmotile, and a non-spore-former. The bacteria are able to grow on seawater media with agar, in which the colonies appear circular, slightly convex, glistening, smooth, yellow, and 1–2 mm in diameter. The DSW-1T strain of D. donghaensis has about 3,923,666 base pairs in its genome. The DNA G+C content for D. donghaensis is 38%.

Image of the phylogenetic tree can be viewed here.

== Pathology ==
D. donghaensis has not been identified as a human pathogen.

== Metabolism ==
D. donghaensis performs light-driven sodium ion transport. This light-driven proton pump is called a proteorhodopsin, which increases the organism's survival rate because it can convert light into energy that the organism needs to grow. Since the organism uses light for energy, it is a phototroph. D. donghaensis is able to secrete enzymes such as catalase and oxidase. Since the organism is a strict aerobe, it used oxygen as a terminal electron acceptor. The organism can grow on peptone and tryptone as the sole carbon and nitrogen sources. D. donghaensis cannot grow in the absence of NaCl or when it is greater than 7% (w/v); growth is optimal at 2% (w/v) NaCl. The organism is susceptible to the antibiotics tetracycline and carbenicillin, although the organism's ability to form biofilms makes it difficult for antibiotics to penetrate the viscous layers.

== Habitat ==
D. donghaensis lives in halophilic marine environments. The organism can grow as low as 4 °C and as high as 35 °C, although the optimum temperature for growth is 30 °C. The optimal pH for growth is 7–8, although growth can be observed at a pH as low as 5.5.

== Biofilm formation ==
D. donghaensis is able to form biofilms in marine habitats, which is a survival strategy that allows the organism to grow while being protected from environmental stresses. Biofilm formation serves a purpose for marine bacteria in that it increases their resistance to antimicrobial agents, desiccation, and grazing. Biofilms allow the microbes to attach to surfaces by excreting extracellular polymeric substances (EPS). Marine bacteria that adhere to surfaces form host-specific and spatially structured communities that are fairly stable.
