= Psychroflexus tropicus =

Scientific classification
- Domain: Bacteria
- Kingdom: Pseudomonadati
- Phylum: Bacteroidota
- Class: Flavobacteriia
- Order: Flavobacteriales
- Family: Flavobacteriaceae
- Genus: Psychroflexus
- Species: P. tropicus

Binomial name
- Psychroflexus tropicus Donachie et al. 2004

Species of bacterium

Psychroflexus tropicus is an obligately halophilic Cytophaga–Flavobacterium–Bacteroides group bacterium. It is Gram-negative, fine rod- to short filament-shaped, with type strain LA1^{T} (=ATCC BAA-734^{T} =DSM 15496^{T}).
