= Chryseobacterium koreense =

Scientific classification
- Domain: Bacteria
- Kingdom: Pseudomonadati
- Phylum: Bacteroidota
- Class: Flavobacteriia
- Order: Flavobacteriales
- Family: Weeksellaceae
- Genus: Chryseobacterium
- Species: C. koreense

Binomial name
- Chryseobacterium koreense Kämpfer et al. 2009

Type strain
- CCUG 49689, Chi707, Chj707, CIP 108606, IAM 15050, JCM 21512, KCTC 12107, NBRC 103027

Synonyms
- Kaistella koreensis

Species of bacterium

Chryseobacterium koreense is a bacterium from the genus Chryseobacterium which has been isolated from fresh mineral water in Korea.
