= Cruoricaptor =

Scientific classification
- Domain: Bacteria
- Kingdom: Pseudomonadati
- Phylum: Bacteroidota
- Class: Flavobacteriia
- Order: Flavobacteriales
- Family: Weeksellaceae
- Genus: Cruoricaptor; Yassin et al. 2013

Type species
- Cruoricaptor ignavus

Species
- C. ignavus

Genus of bacteria

Cruoricaptor is a Gram-negative genus of bacteria from the family of Weeksellaceae with one known species (Cruoricaptor ignavus).
