= Wautersiella =

Scientific classification
- Domain: Bacteria
- Kingdom: Pseudomonadati
- Phylum: Bacteroidota
- Class: Flavobacteriia
- Order: Flavobacteriales
- Family: Weeksellaceae
- Genus: Wautersiella; Kämpfer et al. 2006

Type species
- Wautersiella falsenii

Species
- Wautersiella falsenii

Genus of bacteria

Wautersiella is a genus of bacteria most closely related to Empedobacter brevis in the family Weeksellaceae and the order Flavobacteriales. Originally described in 2006 by Kämpfer et al. based on 26 clinical isolates from Belgium that shared 94-95% homology after 16S ribosomal RNA sequencing. The species described was named Wautersiella falsenii in honor of contemporary microbiologists Belgian Georges Wauters and Norwegian Enevold Falsen.

== Characteristics ==
Wautersiella falsenii is an aerobic, Gram-negative, non-lactose fermenting, non-motile, oxidase-, urease- and catalase-positive, organism 2–3 um in length. The notable distinction between Wautersiella falsenii and Empedobacter brevis is that the latter is urease negative.

== Clinical significance ==
This organism has been isolated from clinical specimens, including blood, respiratory samples, wounds, pleural fluid and the urinary tract. though it is an extremely rare cause of nosocomial infection, it may be significant resistant to many antibiotics, including carbapenems. Recently, it has been found in the context of patient surveillance for carbapenem-resistant organisms with CHROMagar KPC.
