= Psychroflexus =

Scientific classification
- Domain: Bacteria
- Kingdom: Pseudomonadati
- Phylum: Bacteroidota
- Class: Flavobacteriia
- Order: Flavobacteriales
- Family: Flavobacteriaceae
- Genus: Psychroflexus; Bowman et al. 1999

Type species
- Psychroflexus torquis

Species
- P. aestuariivivens P. gondwanensis P. halocasei P. planctonicus P. salarius P. salinarum P. saliphilus P. salis P. sediminis P. torquis P. tropicus

Genus of bacteria

Psychroflexus is a psychrophilic bacteria genus from the family of Flavobacteriaceae.
