= Psychroflexus saliphilus =

Scientific classification
- Domain: Bacteria
- Kingdom: Pseudomonadati
- Phylum: Bacteroidota
- Class: Flavobacteriia
- Order: Flavobacteriales
- Family: Flavobacteriaceae
- Genus: Psychroflexus
- Species: P. saliphilus

Binomial name
- Psychroflexus saliphilus Jin et al. 2016

Type strain
- KCTC 52043, MCCC 1H00134, WDS4A13

Synonyms
- Psychroflexus saliphila

Species of bacterium

Psychroflexus saliphilus is a Gram-negative, rod-shaped and non-motile bacteria from the genus of Psychroflexus which has been isolated from a marine solar saltern from Weihai in China.
