= Spongiimonas =

Scientific classification
- Domain: Bacteria
- Kingdom: Pseudomonadati
- Phylum: Bacteroidota
- Class: Flavobacteriia
- Order: Flavobacteriales
- Family: Weeksellaceae
- Genus: Spongiimonas; Yoon et al. 2014

Species
- S. flava

Bacterium

Spongiimonas is a Gram-negative and strictly aerobic genus of bacteria from the family of Weeksellaceae with one known species (Spongiimonas flava). Spongiimonas flava has been isolated from a marine sponge.
