= Algoriella =

Scientific classification
- Domain: Bacteria
- Kingdom: Pseudomonadati
- Phylum: Bacteroidota
- Class: Flavobacteriia
- Order: Flavobacteriales
- Family: Weeksellaceae
- Genus: Algoriella; Yang et al. 2016

Species
- A. xinjiangensis

Bacterium

Algoriella is a Gram-negative, aerobic, non-spore-forming and psychrotolerant genus of bacteria from the family of Weeksellaceae with on know species Algoriella xinjiangensis. Algoriella xinjiangensis has been isolated from sewage water from the Xinjiang Uighur Autonomous Region.
