= Psychroflexus gondwanensis =

Scientific classification
- Domain: Bacteria
- Kingdom: Pseudomonadati
- Phylum: Bacteroidota
- Class: Flavobacteriia
- Order: Flavobacteriales
- Family: Flavobacteriaceae
- Genus: Psychroflexus
- Species: P. gondwanensis

Binomial name
- Psychroflexus gondwanensis Bowman et al. 1999

Type strain
- ACAM 44, ATCC 51278, CCUG 33444, CIP 104040, DSM 5423, Franzmann ACAM44, KCTC 2919, LMG 13192, NCIMB 13407

Synonyms
- Flavobacterium gondwanense, Psychroflexus gondwanense

Species of bacterium

Psychroflexus gondwanensis is a halophilic bacteria from the genus of Psychroflexus which has been isolated from am organic lake in Antarctica.
