= Riemerella =

Scientific classification
- Domain: Bacteria
- Kingdom: Pseudomonadati
- Phylum: Bacteroidota
- Class: Flavobacteriia
- Order: Flavobacteriales
- Family: Weeksellaceae
- Genus: Riemerella; Segers et al. 1993

Species
- R. anatipestifer R. columbina R. columbipharyngis

Genus of bacteria

Riemerella is a Gram-negative, non-spore-forming and non-motile genus of bacteria from the family of Weeksellaceae.Riemerella is named after O.V. Riemer.
