= Psychroflexus aestuariivivens =

Scientific classification
- Domain: Bacteria
- Kingdom: Pseudomonadati
- Phylum: Bacteroidota
- Class: Flavobacteriia
- Order: Flavobacteriales
- Family: Flavobacteriaceae
- Genus: Psychroflexus
- Species: P. aestuariivivens

Binomial name
- Psychroflexus aestuariivivens Park et al. 2016

Type strain
- KCTC 52037, NBRC 111757, strain DB-3

Species of bacterium

Psychroflexus aestuariivivens is a Gram-negative and aerobic bacteria from the genus of Psychroflexus which has been isolated from tidal flat sediments from the Yellow Sea Korea.
