= Cloacibacterium =

Scientific classification
- Domain: Bacteria
- Kingdom: Pseudomonadati
- Phylum: Bacteroidota
- Class: Flavobacteriia
- Order: Flavobacteriales
- Family: Weeksellaceae
- Genus: Cloacibacterium; Allen et al. 2006

Type species
- Cloacibacterium normanense

Species
- C. haliotis C. normanense C. rupense

Genus of bacteria

Cloacibacterium normanense is a bacterium originally found in wastewater in Norman, Oklahoma. It is Gram-negative, non-motile, and facultatively anaerobic. Physically, it is a rod-shaped organism with yellow pigmentation.

This organism was discovered using a non-selective medium, as opposed to the traditional selective media often used to isolate microorganisms. In this case, the method involved diluting raw sewage.
