= Moheibacter =

Scientific classification
- Domain: Bacteria
- Kingdom: Pseudomonadati
- Phylum: Bacteroidota
- Class: Flavobacteriia
- Order: Flavobacteriales
- Family: Weeksellaceae
- Genus: Moheibacter; Zhang et al. 2014

Species
- M. sediminis M. stercoris

Bacterium

Moheibacter is a genus of bacteria from the family of Weeksellaceae.
