= Psychroflexus torquis =

Scientific classification
- Domain: Bacteria
- Kingdom: Pseudomonadati
- Phylum: Bacteroidota
- Class: Flavobacteriia
- Order: Flavobacteriales
- Family: Flavobacteriaceae
- Genus: Psychroflexus
- Species: P. torquis

Binomial name
- Psychroflexus torquis Bowman et al. 1999

Species of bacterium

Psychroflexus torquis is a species of bacterium. It is psychrophilic and its type strain is strain ACAM 623^{T}. It has the ability to synthesize the polyunsaturated fatty acids eicosapentaenoic acid and arachidonic acid.
