= Frigoriflavimonas =

Scientific classification
- Domain: Bacteria
- Kingdom: Pseudomonadati
- Phylum: Bacteroidota
- Class: Flavobacteriia
- Order: Flavobacteriales
- Family: Weeksellaceae
- Genus: Frigoriflavimonas; Menes et al., 2022
- Species: F. asaccharolytica

Binomial name
- Frigoriflavimonas asaccharolytica Menes et al., 2022

Genus of bacteria

Frigoriflavimonas is a Gram-negative, strictly aerobic and rod-shaped genus of bacteria from the family of Weeksellaceae with one known species, Frigoriflavimonas asaccharolytica.
