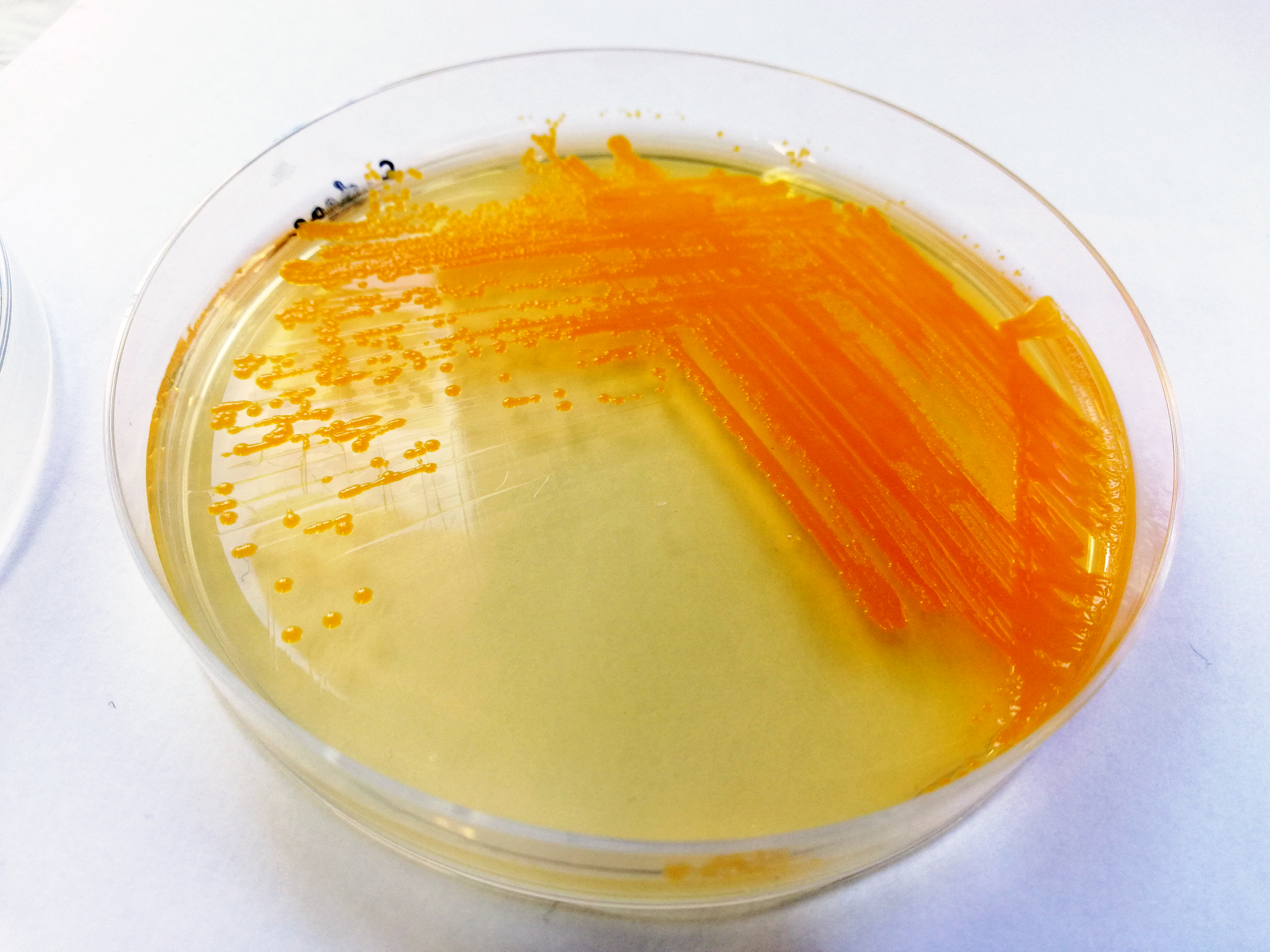
- Chryseobacterium oleae DSM25575 bacteria grown on solid LB media

Scientific classification
- Domain: Bacteria
- Kingdom: Pseudomonadati
- Phylum: Bacteroidota
- Class: Flavobacteriia
- Order: Flavobacteriales
- Family: Weeksellaceae
- Genus: Chryseobacterium; Vandamme et al. 1994

Species
- See text

Synonyms
- Halpernia Nicholson et al. 2020; Epilithonimonas O'Sullivan et al. 2006; Planobacterium Peng et al 2009; Soonwooa Joung et al. 2010; Kaistella Kim et al. 2004; Sejongia Yi et al. 2005

= Chryseobacterium =

Genus of bacteria

Chryseobacterium is a genus of Gram-negative bacteria. Chryseobacterium species are chemoorganotrophic, rod shape gram-negative bacteria. Chryseobacterium form typical yellow-orange color colonies due to flexirubin-type pigment. The genus contains more than 100 described species from diverse habitats, including freshwater sources, soil, marine fish, and human hosts.

== History ==
The genus Chryseobacterium was originally created in 1994 by Vandamme et al. for six bacterial taxa that, at that time, were classified as members of the genus Flavobacterium: F. balustinum, F. indologenes, F. gleum, F. meningosepticum, F. indoltheticum, and F. scophthalmum. In 2005 an additional genus, Elizabethkingia, was created for two species within the genus Chryseobacterium; namely, C. meningosepticum and C. miricola. In 2002 standards and guidelines for description of novel taxa in the family of Flavobacteriaceae were published by Bernardet et al. By 2006, the genus Chryseobacterium had expanded to 10 species, by 2014 more than 60 species and currently more than 100.

== Ecology ==
Chryseobacterium spp. were recovered from soils, plant roots, flowers, decaying plant material and maple sap. Some plant-associated Chryseobacterium strains are able to inhibit plant pathogenic fungi. Chryseobacterium spp. were also recovered from freshwater creeks, lakes, their sediments, water cooling systems, drinking water, lactic acid beverages, beer bottling plants, bioreactor sludge, polluted soil, marine sediment and permafrost. Chryseobacterium spp. are associated with a multitude of animals - they have been detected in the midgut of mosquitos, within cockroach guts, millipede feces, and penguin guano, gut homogenates of freshwater copepods, bird feathers, cow's milk, raw meats and chicken. Chryseobacterium spp. were recovered from the mucus of apparently healthy fish, however sometimes they are considered as a spoilage organism. Three novel cold-tolerant species of Chryseobacterium, C. oranimense C. haifense, and C. bovis, have been detected in raw milk in Israel.

== Pathogenesis ==
The most pathogenic Flavobacterium spp., Chryseobacterium meningosepticum, which caused numerous infections, was reclassified to the genus Elizabethkingia. Chryseobacterium indologenes although ubiquitous in nature, mainly found in soil and water, is an uncommon human pathogen. However, in rare cases it can cause serious infections, particularly among the immunocompromised. Most of the time infections are hospital acquired, often associated with immunosuppression or indwelling catheters. It has been reported as the causative agent in bacteremia, peritonitis, pneumonia, empyema, pyelonephritis, cystitis, meningitis and central venous catheter-associated infections. The numbers of reported C. indologenes infections are increasing. The majority of reported infections have been from Taiwan and only about 10% have been outside of Asia. A few reports have come from Australia, India, Europe and the USA. C. indologenes is also pathogenic to the soft tick, whereas other Chryseobacterium spp. were recovered from diseased turtles, frogs and fish, in particularly C. scophthalmum, C. joostei, C. piscicola, C. chaponense, C. viscerum and C. oncorhynchi, C. aahli, C. hominis, C. shigense as well as C. indologenes which is associated with human diseases.

Certain Chryseobacterium species were reported as having unusual matrix digesting properties, being able to degrade most difficult collagenous matrices, such as feathers or exoskeletons. These properties are likely mediated through the action of specific chitinases and collagenase-like metalloproteases. Some of the species, such as Chryseobacterium nematophagum were shown to be able to infect, kill and ultimately consume all nematode tissues, including the normally highly insoluble cuticular exoskeleton. Chitinase, gelatinase and collagenase metalloprotease activities have been linked to Chryseobacterium gliding motility exerted through type IX secretion systems. Indeed, some of these enzymes possess C-terminal type IX secretion signals. Chryseobacterium themselves have neither collagen nor chitin proteins or structures. Chryseobacterium species belong to the Bacteriodetes phylum, members of which are being increasingly describes as having unusually linked motility and secretory system.

Botulinum neurotoxin-like (BoNT-like) toxins were detected in the genome of Chryseobacterium piperi str. CTM and they present a highly divergent group of BoNT-like toxins. One of the predicted C. piperi BoNT-like toxins induced necrotic cell death in human kidney cells, but was not found to cleave common SNARE substrates of BoNTs.

== Antibiotic resistance ==
Chryseobacterium spp. are inherently resistant to a wide spectrum of antibiotics, including tetracyclines, erythromycin, linezolid, polymyxins, aminoglycosides, chloramphenicol, and many beta-lactams, while also being intermediately sensitive to vancomycin and clindamycin and vary in their sensitivity to trimethoprim-sulfamethoxazole.

== Species ==
Species include:

- Chryseobacterium aahli Loch and Faisal 2014
- Chryseobacterium angstadtii Kirk et al. 2013
- Chryseobacterium antarcticum (Yi et al. 2005) Kämpfer et al. 2009
- Chryseobacterium anthropi Kämpfer et al. 2009
- "Chryseobacterium antibioticum" Dahal et al. 2021
- Chryseobacterium aquaticum Kim et al. 2008
- Chryseobacterium aquifrigidense Park et al. 2008
- Chryseobacterium arachidiradicis Kämpfer et al. 2015
- Chryseobacterium arachidis Kämpfer et al. 2014
- Chryseobacterium arthrosphaerae Kämpfer et al. 2010
- Chryseobacterium artocarpi Venil et al. 2014
- Chryseobacterium aurantiacum Luo et al. 2018
- Chryseobacterium aureum Lee et al. 2019
- Chryseobacterium balustinum (Harrison 1929) Vandamme et al. 1994
- Chryseobacterium bernardetii Holmes et al. 2013
- Chryseobacterium binzhouense Meng et al. 2020
- Chryseobacterium bovis Hantsis-Zacharov et al. 2008
- Chryseobacterium buanense (Joung et al. 2010) García-López et al. 2020
- Chryseobacterium caeni Quan et al. 2007
- Chryseobacterium camelliae Kook et al. 2014
- Chryseobacterium candidae Indu et al. 2020
- Chryseobacterium capnotolerans Heidler von Heilborn et al. 2022
- Chryseobacterium carnipullorum Charimba et al. 2013
- Chryseobacterium carnis Holmes et al. 2013
- Chryseobacterium chaponense Kämpfer et al. 2011
- "Chryseobacterium chengduensis" Wen et al. 2016
- "Chryseobacterium cheonjiense" Chaudhary et al. 2021
- "Chryseobacterium chungangensis" Huq 2018
- Chryseobacterium contaminans Kämpfer et al. 2014
- Chryseobacterium cucumeris Jeong et al. 2017
- Chryseobacterium culicis Kämpfer et al. 2010
- Chryseobacterium daecheongense Kim et al. 2005
- Chryseobacterium daeguense Yoon et al. 2007
- Chryseobacterium defluvii Kämpfer et al. 2003
- Chryseobacterium echinoideorum Lin et al. 2015
- Chryseobacterium elymi Cho et al. 2011
- Chryseobacterium endophyticum Lin et al. 2017
- Chryseobacterium flavum Zhou et al. 2007
- Chryseobacterium formosense Young et al. 2005
- "Chryseobacterium formosus" Akter et al. 2015
- Chryseobacterium frigidisoli Bajerski et al. 2013
- Chryseobacterium frigidum Kim et al. 2016
- Chryseobacterium gallinarum Kämpfer et al. 2014
- Chryseobacterium gambrini Herzog et al. 2008
- Chryseobacterium geocarposphaerae Kämpfer et al. 2014
- Chryseobacterium ginsengisoli Nguyen et al. 2013
- "Chryseobacterium ginsengiterrae" Noh et al. 2017
- Chryseobacterium ginsengiterrae Hahnke et al. 2017
- Chryseobacterium ginsenosidimutans Im et al. 2011
- Chryseobacterium glaciei Pal et al. 2018
- Chryseobacterium gleum (Holmes et al. 1984) Vandamme et al. 1994
- Chryseobacterium gregarium Behrendt et al. 2008
- Chryseobacterium gwangjuense Park et al. 2013
- Chryseobacterium hagamense Cho et al. 2011
- Chryseobacterium haifense Hantsis-Zacharov and Halpern 2007
- Chryseobacterium halperniae Hahnke et al. 2017
- Chryseobacterium hispalense Montero-Calasanz et al. 2013
- Chryseobacterium hispanicum Gallego et al. 2006
- Chryseobacterium hominis Vaneechoutte et al. 2007
- Chryseobacterium humi Pires et al. 2010
- Chryseobacterium hungaricum Szoboszlay et al. 2008
- Chryseobacterium indologenes (Yabuuchi et al. 1983) Vandamme et al. 1994
- Chryseobacterium indoltheticum (Campbell and Williams 1951) Vandamme et al. 1994
- Chryseobacterium jejuense Weon et al. 2008
- Chryseobacterium jeonii (Yi et al. 2005) Kämpfer et al. 2009
- Chryseobacterium joostei Hugo et al. 2003
- Chryseobacterium koreense (Kim et al. 2004) Kämpfer et al. 2009
- Chryseobacterium kwangjuense Sang et al. 2013
- Chryseobacterium lactis Holmes et al. 2013
- Chryseobacterium lacus Zhang et al. 2020
- Chryseobacterium lathyri Cho et al. 2011
- Chryseobacterium limigenitum Kämpfer et al. 2015
- Chryseobacterium lineare Zhao et al. 2017
- Chryseobacterium luteum Behrendt et al. 2007
- "Chryseobacterium manosquense" Boxberger et al. 2020
- Chryseobacterium marinum (Lee et al. 2007) Kämpfer et al. 2009
- "Candidatus Chryseobacterium massiliense" corrig. Greub et al. 2004
- Chryseobacterium molle Herzog et al. 2008
- Chryseobacterium montanum Guo et al. 2016
- "Chryseobacterium mucoviscidosis" Tetz and Tetz 2018
- Chryseobacterium mulctrae Yoon et al. 2019
- Chryseobacterium nakagawai Holmes et al. 2013
- "Chryseobacterium nematophagum" Page et al. 2019
- Chryseobacterium nepalense Chaudhary and Kim 2017
- Chryseobacterium oleae Montero-Calasanz et al. 2014
- Chryseobacterium oncorhynchi Zamora et al. 2012
- Chryseobacterium oranimense Hantsis-Zacharov et al. 2008
- Chryseobacterium pallidum Herzog et al. 2008
- Chryseobacterium palustre Pires et al. 2010
- "Chryseobacterium panacis" Singh et al. 2016
- Chryseobacterium pennipullorum Oosthuizen et al. 2019
- "Chryseobacterium phocaeense" Abou Abdallah et al. 2019
- Chryseobacterium phosphatilyticum Jeong et al. 2019
- Chryseobacterium piperi Strahan et al. 2011
- Chryseobacterium piscicola Ilardi et al. 2009
- Chryseobacterium piscium de Beer et al. 2006
- Chryseobacterium polytrichastri Chen et al. 2015
- Chryseobacterium populi Bortniak et al. 2019
- Chryseobacterium profundimaris Xu et al. 2015
- "Chryseobacterium proteolyticum" Yamaguchi and Yokoe 2000
- Chryseobacterium psychrotolerans (Ge et al. 2015) Hahnke et al. 2017
- Chryseobacterium reticulitermitis Zhao et al. 2017
- Chryseobacterium rhizoplanae Kämpfer et al. 2015
- Chryseobacterium rhizosphaerae Cho et al. 2011
- Chryseobacterium rigui Park et al. 2013
- Chryseobacterium salipaludis Divyasree et al. 2018
- Chryseobacterium salivictor Kim and Yu 2020
- Chryseobacterium scophthalmum (Mudarris et al. 1994) Vandamme et al. 1994
- Chryseobacterium sediminis Kämpfer et al. 2015
- "Chryseobacterium senegalense" Lo et al. 2016
- Chryseobacterium shandongense Yang et al. 2015
- Chryseobacterium shigense Shimomura et al. 2005
- "Chryseobacterium siluri" Oh et al. 2020
- Chryseobacterium solani Du et al. 2015
- Chryseobacterium soldanellicola Park et al. 2006
- Chryseobacterium soli Weon et al. 2008
- Chryseobacterium solincola Benmalek et al. 2010
- Chryseobacterium taeanense Park et al. 2006
- Chryseobacterium taichungense Shen et al. 2005
- Chryseobacterium taihuense Wu et al. 2013
- Chryseobacterium taiwanense Tai et al. 2006
- Chryseobacterium takakiae Zhao et al. 2015
- Chryseobacterium taklimakanense (Peng et al. 2009) Holmes et al. 2013
- Chryseobacterium tenax (O'Sullivan et al. 2006) Hahnke et al. 2017
- "Candidatus Chryseobacterium timonense" corrig. Drancourt et al. 2004
- "Chryseobacterium timonianum" Abou Abdallah et al. 2017
- Chryseobacterium treverense Yassin et al. 2010
- Chryseobacterium tructae Zamora et al. 2013
- Chryseobacterium ureilyticum Herzog et al. 2008
- Chryseobacterium vaccae Lee et al. 2020
- Chryseobacterium vietnamense Li and Zhu 2012
- Chryseobacterium viscerum Zamora et al. 2012
- Chryseobacterium vrystaatense de Beer et al. 2005
- Chryseobacterium wanjuense Weon et al. 2006
- Chryseobacterium xinjiangense Zhao et al. 2011
- Chryseobacterium xixisoli (Feng et al. 2014) Hahnke et al. 2017
- "Chryseobacterium yeoncheonense" Hoang et al. 2013
- Chryseobacterium yonginense Joung and Joh 2011
- Chryseobacterium zeae Kämpfer et al. 2014
- "Chryseobacterium zhengzhouense" Wang et al. 2016
