= Penicillium koreense =

Scientific classification
- Domain: Eukaryota
- Kingdom: Fungi
- Division: Ascomycota
- Class: Eurotiomycetes
- Order: Eurotiales
- Family: Aspergillaceae
- Genus: Penicillium
- Species: P. koreense

Binomial name
- Penicillium koreense S.B.Hong, D.H.Kim & Y.H.You (2014)

Species of fungus

Penicillium koreense is a fungus species in the family Trichocomaceae. Described as new to science in 2014, it is found in Korean soils. It is classified in the section Lanata-Divaricata of the subgenus Aspergilloides, which consists largely of soil-inhabiting species. The type strain (KACC 47721) was isolated from a bamboo field in Goryeong County.
