= Chishuiella =

Scientific classification
- Domain: Bacteria
- Kingdom: Pseudomonadati
- Phylum: Bacteroidota
- Class: Flavobacteriia
- Order: Flavobacteriales
- Family: Flavobacteriaceae
- Genus: Chishuiella; Zhang et al. 2014

Type species
- Chishuiella changwenlii Zhang et al. 2014

Genus of bacteria

Chishuiella is a genus of gram-negative freshwater bacterium. It contains a single species, Chishuiella changwenlii.
