= Flexirubin =

Names
- Preferred IUPAC name 2-Dodecyl-3-hydroxy-5-methylphenyl (2E,4E,6E,8E,10E,12E,14E,16E)-17-(4-hydroxy-3-methylphenyl)heptadeca-2,4,6,8,10,12,14,16-octaenoate

Identifiers
CAS Number	54363-90-5
3D model (JSmol)	Interactive image
ChEBI	CHEBI:87031
ChemSpider	4952920
PubChem CID	6450309
UNII	SEG49MSH93
CompTox Dashboard (EPA)	DTXSID101111372
- InChI: InChI=1S/C43H54O4/c1-4-5-6-7-8-9-17-20-23-26-29-39-41(45)33-36(2)34-42(39)47-43(46)30-27-24-21-18-15-13-11-10-12-14-16-19-22-25-28-38-31-32-40(44)37(3)35-38/h10-16,18-19,21-22,24-25,27-28,30-35,44-45H,4-9,17,20,23,26,29H2,1-3H3/b12-10+,13-11+,16-14+,18-15+,22-19+,24-21+,28-25+,30-27+ Key: GFNJWVBJKYYUIN-CMUOTRNOSA-N
- SMILES: CCCCCCCCCCCCC1=C(C=C(C=C1OC(=O)/C=C/C=C/C=C/C=C/C=C/C=C/C=C/C=C/C2=CC(=C(C=C2)O)C)C)O

Properties
Chemical formula	C_{43}H_{54}O_{4}
Molar mass	634.901 g·mol^{−1}
Appearance	Violet-red needles
Melting point	174–176 °C (345–349 °F; 447–449 K)
- Except where otherwise noted, data are given for materials in their standard state (at 25 °C [77 °F], 100 kPa). Infobox references

Flexirubin is the main pigment in the bacteria genera Flexibacter, Flavobacterium, Chryseobacterium, and Cytophaga. It was isolated for the first time from Flexibacter elegans. Flexirubin is found in these genera, as well as those that produce carotenoids. The pigment mixture of flexirubin and carotenoids imparts colonies with an intense yellow-orange color. Structurally, this bacteria pigment is based on a polycarboxylic-chromophore that is linked with a phenol by an ester, resulting in an alkyl side-chain. The first total synthesis of flexirubin was reported in 1977.

To test for the presence of flexirubin, a cultural strain with a 20% potassium hydroxide solution is created. A color change from gold to red-brown indicates the presence of flexirubin. Alternatively, the pigment can also be extracted with acetone and chromatographic methods can be used to ascertain its presence.
