= Non-motile bacteria =

Bacteria without means of self-propulsion

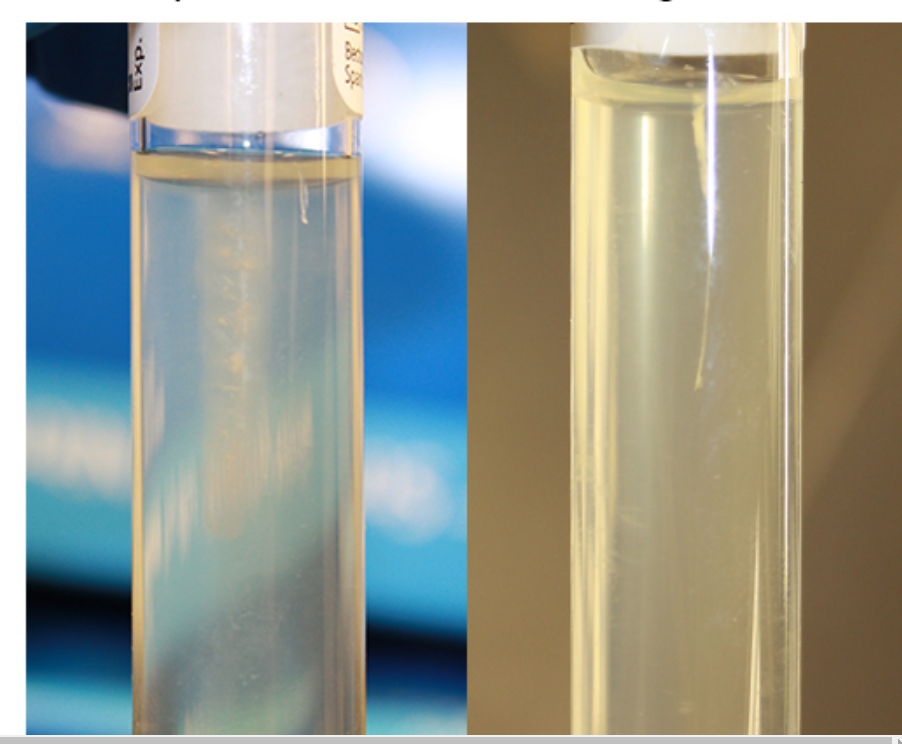
Motile and non-motile bacteria can be differentiated along the stab lines. Motile bacteria will grow out from the stab line while non-motile bacteria are present only along the stab line.

Non-motile bacteria are bacteria species that lack the ability and structures that would allow them to propel themselves, under their own power, through their environment. When non-motile bacteria are cultured in a stab tube, they only grow along the stab line. If the bacteria are mobile, the line will appear diffuse and extend into the medium. The cell structures that provide the ability for locomotion are the cilia and flagella. Coliform and Streptococci are examples of non-motile bacteria as are Klebsiella pneumoniae, and Yersinia pestis. Motility is one characteristic used in the identification of bacteria and evidence of possessing structures: peritrichous flagella, polar flagella and/or a combination of both.

Though the lack of motility might be regarded a disadvantage, some non-motile bacteria possess structures that allow their attachment to eukaryotic cells, like GI mucosal cells.

Some genera have been divided based upon the presence or absence of motility. Motility is determined by using a motility medium. The ingredients include motility test medium, nutrient broth powder, NaCl and distilled water. An inoculating needle (not a loop) is used to insert the bacterial sample. The needle is inserted through the medium for a length of one inch. The media tube incubated at 38 °C (100 °F). Bacteria that are motile grow away from the stab, and toward the sides and downward toward the bottom of the tube. Growth should be observed in 24 to 48 hours. With some species, the bacterium is inconsistent related to its motility.
