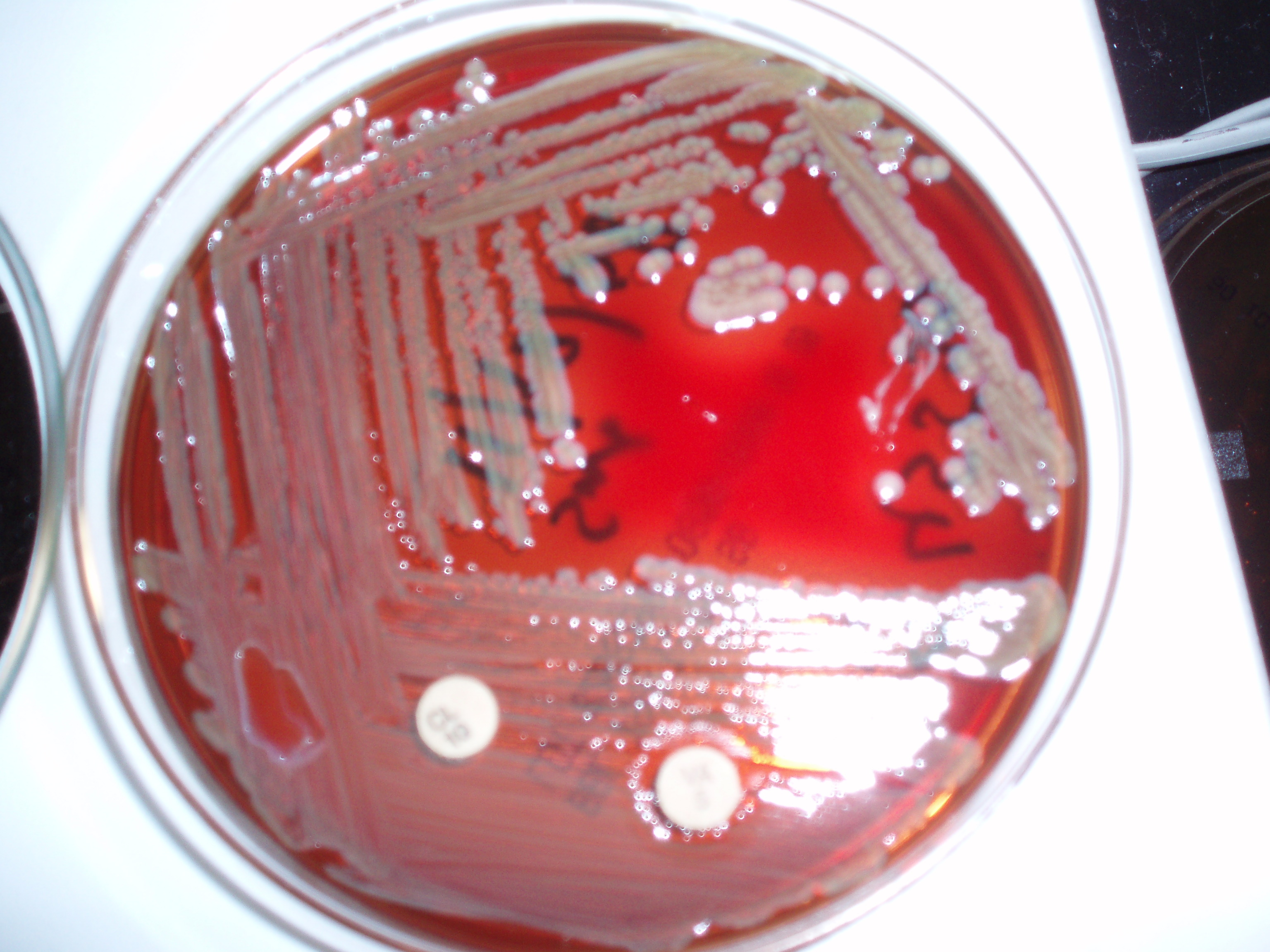
- Elizabethkingia meningoseptica on a blood agar plate

Scientific classification
- Domain: Bacteria
- Kingdom: Pseudomonadati
- Phylum: Bacteroidota
- Class: Flavobacteriia
- Order: Flavobacteriales
- Family: Weeksellaceae; García-López et al. 2020

Genera
- See text.

= Weeksellaceae =

Family of bacteria

Weeksellaceae is a family in the order Flavobacteriales. It was proposed to be split from the Flavobacteriaceae in 2019, based on phylogenetic analysis.

== Genera ==
The family Weeksellaceae comprises the following genera:

- Algoriella Yang et al. 2016
- Apibacter Kwong and Moran 2016
- Bergeyella Vandamme et al. 1994
- Chishuiella Zhang et al. 2014
- Chryseobacterium Vandamme et al. 1994
- Cloacibacterium Allen et al. 2006
- Cruoricaptor Yassin et al. 2013
- Elizabethkingia Kim et al. 2005
- Empedobacter (ex Prévot 1961) Vandamme et al. 1994
- Frigoriflavimonas Menes et al. 2022
- Marnyiella Zhao et al. 2023
- Moheibacter Zhang et al. 2014
- Ornithobacterium Vandamme et al. 1994
- Profundicola Romanenko et al. 2024
- Riemerella Segers et al. 1993
- Spongiimonas Yoon et al. 2014
- Wautersiella Kämpfer et al. 2006
- Weeksella Holmes et al. 1987
- Wuhapuella Sun et al. 2026

== Phylogeny ==
The currently accepted taxonomy is based on the List of Prokaryotic names with Standing in Nomenclature and the phylogeny is based on whole-genome sequences. (Note: Spongiimonas and Wautersiella are not included in this phylogenetic tree.)

- - Weeksellaceae
    - - Ornithobacterium
      - - Moheibacter
        - - Weeksella
          - - Chishuiella
            - - Empedobacter
              - Algoriella
    - - Apibacter
      - - Cruoricaptor
        - - Bergeyella
          - - Elizabethkingia
            - - Riemerella
              - - Cloacibacterium
                - Chryseobacterium
  - outgroups
    - Ichthyobacteriaceae
    - Flavobacteriaceae
