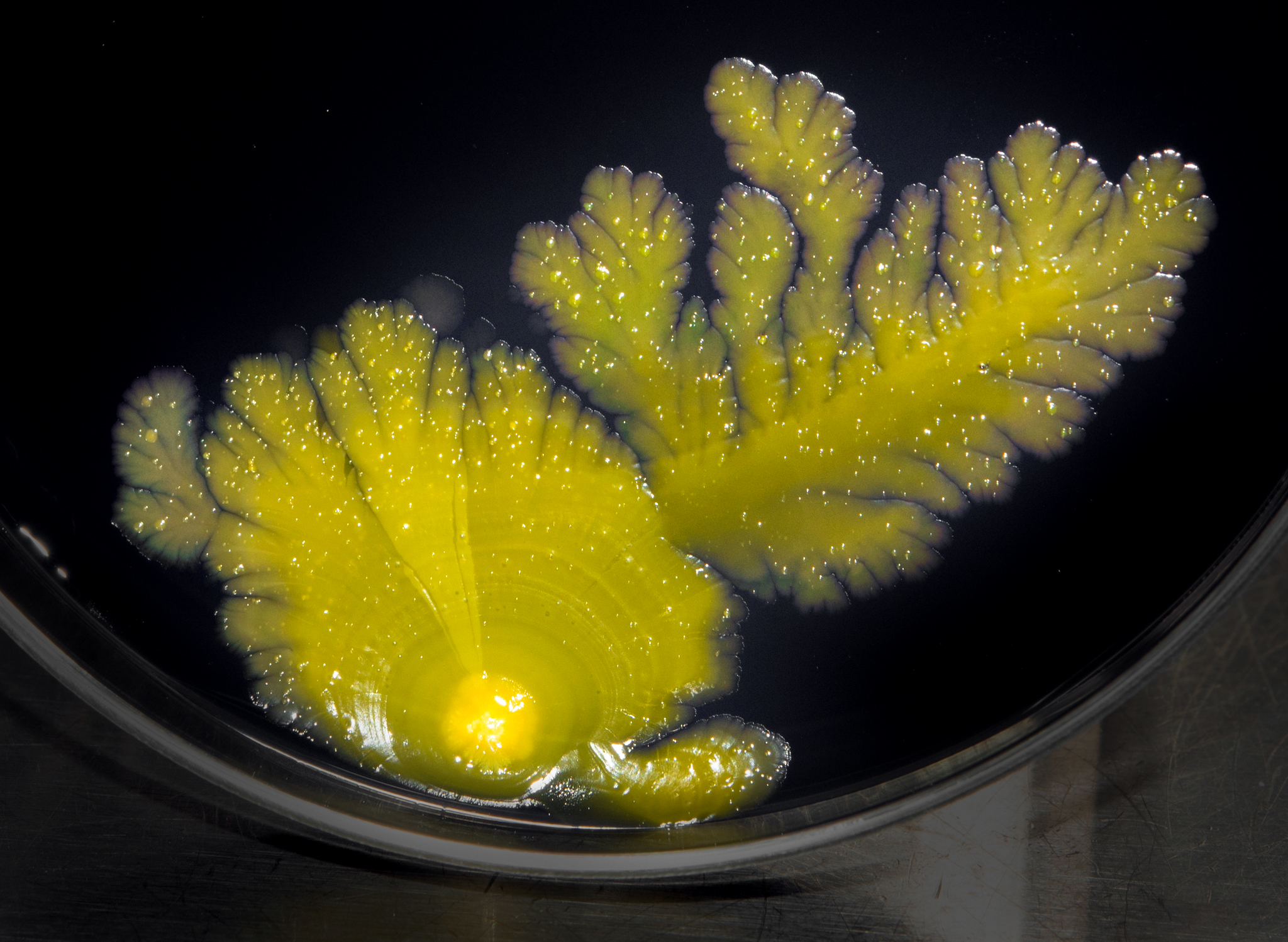
- Sphingomonas phyllosphaerae

Scientific classification
- Domain: Bacteria
- Kingdom: Pseudomonadati
- Phylum: Pseudomonadota
- Class: Alphaproteobacteria
- Order: Sphingomonadales
- Family: Sphingomonadaceae
- Genus: Sphingomonas; Yabuuchi et al., 1990

Species
- Sphingomonas abaci Sphingomonas abikonensis Sphingomonas adhaesiva Sphingomonas aerolata Sphingomonas aerophila Sphingomonas aestuarii Sphingomonas alaskensis Sphingomonas alpina Sphingomonas aquatilis Sphingomonas aromaticivorans Sphingomonas asaccharolytica Sphingomonas astaxanthinifaciens Sphingomonas aurantiaca Sphingomonas azotifigens Sphingomonas baekryungensis Sphingomonas capsulata Sphingomonas canadensis Sphingomonas changbaiensis Sphingomonas chlorophenolica Sphingomonas chungbukensis Sphingomonas cloacae Sphingomonas cynarae Sphingomonas daechungensis Sphingomonas desiccabilis Sphingomonas dokdonensis Sphingomonas echinoides Sphingomonas elodea Sphingomonas endophytica Sphingomonas faeni Sphingomonas fennica Sphingomonas flava Sphingomonas formosensis Sphingomonas gei Sphingomonas gimensis Sphingomonas ginsengisoli Sphingomonas ginsenosidimutans Sphingomonas glacialis Sphingomonas guangdongensis Sphingomonas haloaromaticamans Sphingomonas hankookensis Sphingomonas herbicidovorans Sphingomonas histidinilytica Sphingomonas indica Sphingomonas insulae Sphingomonas japonica Sphingomonas jaspsi Sphingomonas jejuensis Sphingomonas jinjuensis Sphingomonas kaistensis Sphingomonas koreensis Sphingomonas kyeonggiensis Sphingomonas kyungheensis Sphingomonas lacus Sphingomonas laterariae Sphingomonas leidyi Sphingomonas macrogoltabidus Sphingomonas mali Sphingomonas melonis Sphingomonas molluscorum Sphingomonas morindae Sphingomonas mucosissima Sphingomonas naasensis Sphingomonas natatoria Sphingomonas oligoaromativorans Sphingomonas oligophenolica Sphingomonas oryziterrae Sphingomonas panni Sphingomonas parapaucimobilis Sphingomonas paucimobilis Sphingomonas phyllosphaerae Sphingomonas pituitosa Sphingomonas polyaromaticivorans Sphingomonas pruni Sphingomonas pseudosanguinis Sphingomonas psychrolutea Sphingomonas rosa Sphingomonas roseiflava Sphingomonas rubra Sphingomonas sanguinis Sphingomonas sanxanigenens Sphingomonas sediminicola Sphingomonas soli Sphingomonas starnbergensis Sphingomonas stygia Sphingomonas subarctica Sphingomonas suberifaciens Sphingomonas subterranea Sphingomonas taejonensis Sphingomonas terrae Sphingomonas trueperi Sphingomonas ursincola Sphingomonas vulcanisoli Sphingomonas wittichii Sphingomonas xenophaga Sphingomonas xinjiangensis Sphingomonas yabuuchiae Sphingomonas yantingensis Sphingomonas yanoikuyae Sphingomonas yunnanensis Sphingomonas zeae

= Sphingomonas =

Genus of bacteria

Sphingomonas was defined in 1990 as a group of Gram-negative, rod-shaped, chemoheterotrophic, strictly aerobic bacteria. They possess ubiquinone 10 as their major respiratory quinone, contain glycosphingolipids (GSLs), specifically ceramide, instead of lipopolysaccharide (LPS) in their cell envelopes, and typically produce yellow-pigmented colonies. The GSL serves to protect the bacteria from antibacterial substances. Unlike most Gram-negative bacteria, Sphingomonas cannot carry endotoxins due to the lack of lipopolysaccharides, and has a hydrophobic surface characterized by the short nature of the GSL's carbohydrate portion.

By 2001, the genus included more than 20 species that were quite diverse in terms of their phylogenetic, ecological, and physiological properties. As a result, Sphingomonas was subdivided into different genera: Sphingomonas, Sphingobium, Novosphingobium, Sphingosinicella, and Sphingopyxis. These genera are commonly referred to collectively as sphingomonads. Distinct from other sphingomonads, Sphingomonas genomic structure includes a unique lipid formation, major 2-OH fatty acids, homospermidine as the primary polyamine, and signature nucleotide bases within the 16S rRNA gene. The bacteria hold 3,914 proteins, 70 organizational RNA, and 3,948,000 base pairs (incomplete observation).

== Habitat ==
The sphingomonads are widely distributed in nature, having been isolated from many different land and water habitats, as well as from plant root systems, clinical specimens, and other sources; this is due to their ability to survive in low concentrations of nutrients, as well as to metabolize a wide variety of carbon sources. Numerous strains have been isolated from environments contaminated with toxic compounds, where they display the ability to use the contaminants as nutrients.

== Role in disease ==
Some of the sphingomonads (especially Sphingomonas paucimobilis) also play a role in human disease, primarily by causing a range of mostly nosocomial, non-life-threatening infections that typically are easily treated by antibiotic therapy. In contrast, the seed-endophytic strain Sphingomonas melonis ZJ26 that can be naturally enriched in certain rice cultivars, confers diseases resistance against a bacterial pathogen and is vertically transmitted among plant generations via their seeds.

== Applications ==
=== Biotechnological utilization ===
Due to their biodegradative and biosynthetic capabilities, sphingomonads have been used for a wide range of biotechnological applications, from bioremediation of environmental contaminants to production of extracellular polymers such as sphingans (e.g., gellan, welan, and rhamsan) used extensively in the food and other industries. The shorter carbohydrate moiety of GSL compared to that of LPS results in the cell surface being more hydrophobic than that of other Gram-negative bacteria, probably accounting for both Sphingomonas' sensitivity to hydrophobic antibiotics and its ability to degrade hydrophobic polycyclic aromatic hydrocarbons. One strain, Sphingomonas sp. 2MPII, can degrade 2-methylphenanthrene. In May 2008, Daniel Burd, a 16-year-old Canadian, won the Canada-Wide Science Fair in Ottawa after discovering that Sphingomonas can degrade over 40% of the weight of plastic bags (polyethylene) in less than three months.

A Sphingomonas sp. strain BSAR-1 expressing a high activity alkaline phosphatase (PhoK) has also been applied for bioprecipitation of uranium from alkaline solutions. The precipitation ability was enhanced by overexpressing PhoK protein in E. coli. This is the first report of bioprecipitation of uranium under alkaline conditions.

=== Wine fermentation ===
Wine, developed through the alcoholic fermentation of grapes, is an alcoholic beverage that is sensorially characterized by micro-bacteria and a host of other environmental factors. While historic variables such as location, temperature, soil quality, and winemaking practices play a role in altering the taste of a wine, microbial biogeography plays a significant role in the quality of wine. A terroir, comprising the aforementioned characteristics, influences the quality of the wine grapes based on the unique vineyard region that it originates from. The bacterial diversity of the grapes anticipates a wine's chemical structure. The management of these microbial factors, within the fermentation process, allows producers to control the prevalence of desirable regional attributes.

While most microbiota cannot survive the wine fermentation process, Sphingomonas, found in soil, grape leaves, and on fermentation surfaces, can survive this process. The pigmentation, stress resistance levels, unique restorative DNA system, and low nutrient necessity allows further growth in the phyllosphere. As the grape matures, the microbial count increases due to nutrient availability and expansion of its surface area. Researchers at the University of California, Davis observed an increase in abundance of the Sphingomonas bacteria from finished wines cultivated within Napa and Sonoma Counties, California. This indicates that Sphingomonas is a biomarker for the chemical composition of wine. Sphingomonas is found throughout the wine fermentation process indicating a relationship between the bacteria and microbial terroir of the wines.
