= Sphingopyxis ginsengisoli =

Scientific classification
- Domain: Bacteria
- Kingdom: Pseudomonadati
- Phylum: Pseudomonadota
- Class: Alphaproteobacteria
- Order: Sphingomonadales
- Family: Sphingomonadaceae
- Genus: Sphingopyxis
- Species: S. ginsengisoli

Binomial name
- Sphingopyxis ginsengisoli Lee et al. 2008

Type strain
- KCTC 12582, LMG 23390, Gsoil 250

Genus of bacteria

Sphingopyxis ginsengisoli is a Gram-negative, aerobic, rod-shaped and motile bacterium from the genus of Sphingopyxis which has been isolated from soil from a ginseng field from Pocheon in Korea.
