= Sphingopyxis panaciterrulae =

Scientific classification
- Domain: Bacteria
- Kingdom: Pseudomonadati
- Phylum: Pseudomonadota
- Class: Alphaproteobacteria
- Order: Sphingomonadales
- Family: Sphingomonadaceae
- Genus: Sphingopyxis
- Species: S. panaciterrulae

Binomial name
- Sphingopyxis panaciterrulae Srinivasan 2009

Species of bacterium

Sphingopyxis panaciterrulae is a bacterium. It is gram-negative, rod-shaped and motile. Its type strain is DCY34^{T} (=KCTC 22112^{T} =JCM 14844^{T}).
