= Sphingomonas insulae =

Scientific classification
- Domain: Bacteria
- Kingdom: Pseudomonadati
- Phylum: Pseudomonadota
- Class: Alphaproteobacteria
- Order: Sphingomonadales
- Family: Sphingomonadaceae
- Genus: Sphingomonas
- Species: S. insulae

Binomial name
- Sphingomonas insulae Yoon et al. 2008

Type strain
- CIP 110394, DS-28, DSM 21792, JCM 14603, KCTC 12872

Species of bacterium

Sphingomonas insulae is a Gram-negative, rod-shaped and motile bacteria from the genus of Sphingomonas which has been isolated from soil in Dokdo in Korea.
