= Sphingomonas jaspsi =

Scientific classification
- Domain: Bacteria
- Kingdom: Pseudomonadati
- Phylum: Pseudomonadota
- Class: Alphaproteobacteria
- Order: Sphingomonadales
- Family: Sphingomonadaceae
- Genus: Sphingomonas
- Species: S. jaspsi

Binomial name
- Sphingomonas jaspsi Asker et al. 2007

Type strain
- CCUG 53607, CIP 109619, DSM 18422, NBRC 102120, TDMA-16

Species of bacterium

Sphingomonas jaspsi is a Gram-negative, aerobic, pleomorphic and motile bacteria from the genus Sphingomonas which has been isolated from fresh water in Misasa in Japan. Sphingomonas jaspsi produces carotenoid.
