= Sphingopyxis chilensis =

Scientific classification
- Domain: Bacteria
- Kingdom: Pseudomonadati
- Phylum: Pseudomonadota
- Class: Alphaproteobacteria
- Order: Sphingomonadales
- Family: Sphingomonadaceae
- Genus: Sphingopyxis
- Species: S. chilensis

Binomial name
- Sphingopyxis chilensis Godoy et al. 2003

Type strain
- DSM 14889, LMG 20986, strain S37

Genus of bacteria

Sphingopyxis chilensis is a chlorophenol-degrading bacterium from the genus Sphingopyxis which has been isolated from sediments from the Biobio river in Chile.
