= Sphingomonas soli =

Scientific classification
- Domain: Bacteria
- Kingdom: Pseudomonadati
- Phylum: Pseudomonadota
- Class: Alphaproteobacteria
- Order: Sphingomonadales
- Family: Sphingomonadaceae
- Genus: Sphingomonas
- Species: S. soli

Binomial name
- Sphingomonas soli Yang et al. 2006

Type strain
- CIP 109210, DSM 18313, IAM 15213, JCM 21668, KCTC 12210, NBRC 100801, T5-04

Species of bacterium

Sphingomonas soli is a Gram-negative, non-spore-forming and rod-shaped bacteria from the genus Sphingomonas which has been isolated from soil from a ginseng field in Korea. Sphingomonas soli produces beta-glucosidase.
