= Sphingomonas indica =

Scientific classification
- Domain: Bacteria
- Kingdom: Pseudomonadati
- Phylum: Pseudomonadota
- Class: Alphaproteobacteria
- Order: Sphingomonadales
- Family: Sphingomonadaceae
- Genus: Sphingomonas
- Species: S. indica

Binomial name
- Sphingomonas indica Niharika et al. 2012

Type strain
- CCM 7882, Dd16, DSM 25434

Species of bacterium

Sphingomonas indica is a Gram-negative, rod-shaped and non-motile bacteria from the genus Sphingomonas which has been isolated from hexachlorocyclohexane soil from a dump site in Ummari near Lucknow in Uttar Pradesh in India.
