= Sphingomonas alpina =

Scientific classification
- Domain: Bacteria
- Kingdom: Pseudomonadati
- Phylum: Pseudomonadota
- Class: Alphaproteobacteria
- Order: Sphingomonadales
- Family: Sphingomonadaceae
- Genus: Sphingomonas
- Species: S. alpina

Binomial name
- Sphingomonas alpina Margesin et al. 2012

Type strain
- DSM 22537, LMG 26055, S8-3

Species of bacterium

Sphingomonas alpina is a Gram-negative, aerobic, psychrophilic and motile bacteria from the genus Sphingomonas which has been isolated from alpine soil from the High Tauern in Austria.
