= Sphingopyxis italica =

Scientific classification
- Domain: Bacteria
- Kingdom: Pseudomonadati
- Phylum: Pseudomonadota
- Class: Alphaproteobacteria
- Order: Sphingomonadales
- Family: Sphingomonadaceae
- Genus: Sphingopyxis
- Species: S. italica

Binomial name
- Sphingopyxis italica Alias-Villegas et al. 2013

Species of bacterium

Sphingopyxis italica is a bacterium. It is Gram-negative, aerobic, motile, rod-shaped and was isolated from volcanic rock in the Roman catacombs of Saint Callixtus in Rome. Its type strain is SC13E-S71^{T} ( = DSM 25229^{T} = CECT 8016^{T}).
