= Sphingomonas kaistensis =

Scientific classification
- Domain: Bacteria
- Kingdom: Pseudomonadati
- Phylum: Pseudomonadota
- Class: Alphaproteobacteria
- Order: Sphingomonadales
- Family: Sphingomonadaceae
- Genus: Sphingomonas
- Species: S. kaistensis

Binomial name
- Sphingomonas kaistensis Kim et al. 2007

Type strain
- DSM 16846, KCTC 12334, PB56

Species of bacterium

Sphingomonas kaistensis is a Gram-negative, non-motile and non-spore-forming bacteria from the genus Sphingomonas which has been isolated from soil in Korea.
