= Sphingomonas canadensis =

Scientific classification
- Domain: Bacteria
- Kingdom: Pseudomonadati
- Phylum: Pseudomonadota
- Class: Alphaproteobacteria
- Order: Sphingomonadales
- Family: Sphingomonadaceae
- Genus: Sphingomonas
- Species: S. canadensis

Binomial name
- Sphingomonas canadensis Abraham et al. 2013

Type strain
- CCUG 62982, FWC47, LMG 27141, Smit FWC 47

Synonyms
- Sphingomonas candensis

Species of bacterium

Sphingomonas canadensis is an aerobic bacteria from the genus Sphingomonas which has been isolated from a sludge pond in British Columbia in Canada.
