= Sphingomonas trueperi =

Scientific classification
- Domain: Bacteria
- Kingdom: Pseudomonadati
- Phylum: Pseudomonadota
- Class: Alphaproteobacteria
- Order: Sphingomonadales
- Family: Sphingomonadaceae
- Genus: Sphingomonas
- Species: S. trueperi

Binomial name
- Sphingomonas trueperi Kämpfer et al. 1997

Synonyms
- Pseudomonas azotocolligans Anderson 1955

Species of bacterium

Sphingomonas trueperi is a Gram-negative soil bacterium.
