= Sphingomonas polyaromaticivorans =

Scientific classification
- Domain: Bacteria
- Kingdom: Pseudomonadati
- Phylum: Pseudomonadota
- Class: Alphaproteobacteria
- Order: Sphingomonadales
- Family: Sphingomonadaceae
- Genus: Sphingomonas
- Species: S. polyaromaticivorans

Binomial name
- Sphingomonas polyaromaticivorans Luo et al. 2012

Type strain
- JCM 16711, KCCM 42951, B2-7

Species of bacterium

Sphingomonas polyaromaticivorans is a Gram-negative, aerobic, short-rod-shaped and non-motile bacteria from the genus Sphingomonas which has been isolated from water from the Botan Oil Port in Xiamen in China. Sphingomonas polyaromaticivorans has the ability to degrade hydrocarbon compounds.
