= Sphingomonas molluscorum =

Scientific classification
- Domain: Bacteria
- Kingdom: Pseudomonadati
- Phylum: Pseudomonadota
- Class: Alphaproteobacteria
- Order: Sphingomonadales
- Family: Sphingomonadaceae
- Genus: Sphingomonas
- Species: S. molluscorum

Binomial name
- Sphingomonas molluscorum Romanenko et al. 2007

Type strain
- CIP 109223, JCM 14122, KMM 3882, NRIC 0685, An 18

Species of bacterium

Sphingomonas molluscorum is a Gram-negative, aerobic and non-motile bacteria from the genus Sphingomonas which has been isolated from the mollusc Anadara broughtonii in the Peter the Great Bay in Russia.
