= Sphingomonas rubra =

Scientific classification
- Domain: Bacteria
- Kingdom: Pseudomonadati
- Phylum: Pseudomonadota
- Class: Alphaproteobacteria
- Order: Sphingomonadales
- Family: Sphingomonadaceae
- Genus: Sphingomonas
- Species: S. rubra

Binomial name
- Sphingomonas rubra Huo et al. 2011

Type strain
- BH3, CGMCC 1.9113, CIP 110396, JCM 16230

Species of bacterium

Sphingomonas rubra is a Gram-negative, rod-shaped, neutrophilic and motile bacteria from the genus Sphingomonas which has been isolated from wastewater from a leather plant in China.
