= Sphingomonas changbaiensis =

Scientific classification
- Domain: Bacteria
- Kingdom: Pseudomonadati
- Phylum: Pseudomonadota
- Class: Alphaproteobacteria
- Order: Sphingomonadales
- Family: Sphingomonadaceae
- Genus: Sphingomonas
- Species: S. changbaiensis

Binomial name
- Sphingomonas changbaiensis Zhang et al. 2010

Type strain
- CGMCC 1.7057, CIP 110386, NBRC 104936, V2M44

Species of bacterium

Sphingomonas changbaiensis is a Gram-negative and rod-shaped bacteria from the genus Sphingomonas which has been isolated from forest soil from the Changbai Mountains in the Heilongjiang Province in China.
