= Sphingomonas mucosissima =

Scientific classification
- Domain: Bacteria
- Kingdom: Pseudomonadati
- Phylum: Pseudomonadota
- Class: Alphaproteobacteria
- Order: Sphingomonadales
- Family: Sphingomonadaceae
- Genus: Sphingomonas
- Species: S. mucosissima

Binomial name
- Sphingomonas mucosissima Reddy and Garcia-Pichel 2007

Type strain
- ATCC BAA-1239, CIP 110409, CP173-2, DSM 17494

Species of bacterium

Sphingomonas mucosissima is a Gram-negative and non-motile bacteria from the genus Sphingomonas which has been isolated from soil crusts from the Colorado Plateau in the United States.
