= Sphingomonas formosensis =

Scientific classification
- Domain: Bacteria
- Kingdom: Pseudomonadati
- Phylum: Pseudomonadota
- Class: Alphaproteobacteria
- Order: Sphingomonadales
- Family: Sphingomonadaceae
- Genus: Sphingomonas
- Species: S. formosensis

Binomial name
- Sphingomonas formosensis Lin et al. 2012

Type strain
- BCRC 80272, CC-Nfb-2, DSM 24164

Species of bacterium

Sphingomonas formosensis is a Gram-negative and short rod-shaped bacteria from the genus Sphingomonas which has been isolated from agricultural soil in Kaohsiung County in Taiwan. Sphingomonas formosensis has the ability to degrade polycyclic aromatic hydrocarbon compounds.
