= Sphingopyxis nepalensis =

Scientific classification
- Domain: Bacteria
- Kingdom: Pseudomonadati
- Phylum: Pseudomonadota
- Class: Alphaproteobacteria
- Order: Sphingomonadales
- Family: Sphingomonadaceae
- Genus: Sphingopyxis
- Species: S. nepalensis

Binomial name
- Sphingopyxis nepalensis Chaudhary and Kim 2018

Type strain
- JCM 32250, KACC 19389, KEMB 9005-694, strain Ktm-14

Genus of bacteria

Sphingopyxis nepalensis is a Gram-negative, rod-shaped and non-motile bacterium from the genus of Sphingopyxis which has been isolated from oil-contaminated soil from Biratnagar in Nepal.
