= Sphingomonas faeni =

Scientific classification
- Domain: Bacteria
- Kingdom: Pseudomonadati
- Phylum: Pseudomonadota
- Class: Alphaproteobacteria
- Order: Sphingomonadales
- Family: Sphingomonadaceae
- Genus: Sphingomonas
- Species: S. faeni

Binomial name
- Sphingomonas faeni Busse et al. 2003

Type strain
- CCUG 48436, CIP 108370, DSM 14747, LMG 21379, MA-olki

Synonyms
- Sphingomonas faenia

Species of bacterium

Sphingomonas faeni is a Gram-negative bacteria from the genus Sphingomonas which has been isolated from indoor dusts from animal sheds in Finland.
