= Sphingomonas oryziterrae =

Scientific classification
- Domain: Bacteria
- Kingdom: Pseudomonadati
- Phylum: Pseudomonadota
- Class: Alphaproteobacteria
- Order: Sphingomonadales
- Family: Sphingomonadaceae
- Genus: Sphingomonas
- Species: S. oryziterrae

Binomial name
- Sphingomonas oryziterrae Chung et al. 2011

Type strain
- CIP 110408, DSM 21455, KCTC 22476, YC6722

Species of bacterium

Sphingomonas oryziterrae is a Gram-negative and rod-shaped bacteria from the genus Sphingomonas which has been isolated from rhizosphere soil from rice fields (Oryza sativa) in Jinju in Korea.
