= Sphingomonas pruni =

Scientific classification
- Domain: Bacteria
- Kingdom: Pseudomonadati
- Phylum: Pseudomonadota
- Class: Alphaproteobacteria
- Order: Sphingomonadales
- Family: Sphingomonadaceae
- Genus: Sphingomonas
- Species: S. pruni

Binomial name
- Sphingomonas pruni Takeuchi et al. 1995

Type strain
- ATCC 51838, BCRC 17402, CCRC 17402, CIP 107352, DSM 10566, HAMBI 2069, IAM 14461, IFO 15498, JCM 10277, KCTC 2824, LMG 17327, LMG 17538, LMG 18380, NBRC 15498, NCIMB 13411, Y-250

Species of bacterium

Sphingomonas pruni is a bacterium from the genus Sphingomonas which has been isolated from the roots of the tree Prunus persica in Japan.
