= Blastomonas aquatica =

Scientific classification
- Domain: Bacteria
- Kingdom: Pseudomonadati
- Phylum: Pseudomonadota
- Class: Alphaproteobacteria
- Order: Sphingomonadales
- Family: Sphingomonadaceae
- Genus: Blastomonas
- Species: B. aquatica

Binomial name
- Blastomonas aquatica Xiao et al. 2015

Type strain
- PE4-5, CGMCC 1.12851, JCM 30179

Species of bacterium

Blastomonas aquatica is a Gram-negative, bacteriochlorophyll-containing and aerobic bacteria from the genus of Blastomonas which has been isolated from the Lake Peng Co and the Lake Namtso from the Tibetan Plateau in China.
