= Sphingomonas yanoikuyae =

Scientific classification
- Domain: Bacteria
- Kingdom: Pseudomonadati
- Phylum: Pseudomonadota
- Class: Alphaproteobacteria
- Order: Sphingomonadales
- Family: Sphingomonadaceae
- Genus: Sphingomonas
- Species: S. yanoikuyae

Binomial name
- Sphingomonas yanoikuyae Yabuuchi et al. 1990

Species of bacterium

Sphingomonas yanoikuyae is a short rod-shaped, strictly aerobic, Gram-negative, non-motile, non-spore-forming, chemoheterotrophic species of bacteria that is yellow or off-white in color. Its type strain is JCM 7371 (= GIFU 9882). It is notable for degrading a variety of aromatic compounds including biphenyl, naphthalene, phenanthrene, toluene, m-, and p-xylene. S. yanoikuyae was discovered by Brian Goodman on the southern coast of Papua New Guinea. However, Sphingomonas have a wide distribution across freshwater, seawater, and terrestrial habitats. This is due to the bacteria's ability to grow and survive under low-nutrient conditions as it can utilize a broad range of organic compounds.

== Microbiological characteristics ==
Mature S. yanoikuyae cells typically consist of short rod-shaped groups that are 0.3-0.8 μm by 1.0-2.7 μm in dimension and form yellow-pigmented colonies. This bacterium is unique among Gram-negative bacteria because it lacks endotoxin carrier lipopolysaccharides (LPS), and instead has a cell membrane made up of phospholipids, proteins, and respiratory quinones, and an outer membrane containing glycosphingolipids (GSLs). This makes S. yanoikuyae more hydrophobic in comparison to other Gram-negative bacteria. Moving onto metabolism, since S. yanoikuyae is a chemoheterotroph, it primarily derives its energy from chemicals and other organisms. S. yanoikuyae has the ability to metabolize a wide variety of different carbon sources, such as L-arabinose, D-xylose, galactose, Salicin, mannose, D-turanose, and caprate. S. yanoikuyae primarily uses glucose to encourage growth, but also uses other sugars such as arabinose, galactose, mannose, fucose, lactose, xylose, trehalose, melibiose, and sucrose. More so, the bacteria obtains energy from sources like Dimethyl phthalate (DMP), biphenyl, naphthalene, phenanthrene, toluene, and m-/p-xylene.

== Environment ==
Due to S. yanoikuyae’s ability to survive in conditions of low concentrations of nutrients, this bacteria has been found in various environments, ranging from terrestrial to aqueous habitats. Not only this, but S. yanoikuyae has also been found in a few locations contaminated by toxic compounds, such as pentachlorophenol, PCBs, herbicides, and creosote, and immediately displayed their versatility when researchers discovered that it utilized one or more of the contaminants as their carbon sources. Additionally, S. yanoikuyae can degrade monosaccharides, polysachharides, and disaccharides. In regards to their unique bio-degradative and biosynthetic abilities, S. yanoikuyae are potential candidates to possibly be used in future biotechnological applications, such as bioremediation of environmental contaminants. This is significant as its metabolic mechanisms can be utilized in bioremediation and food technology. This means that while S. yanoikuyae has been found in Papua New Guinea and marine sediments off the ocean floor of the South China Sea, it will likely be cultured from its habitats and transferred to various environments.

== Phenotypic and genetic characteristics ==
Sphingomonas yanoikuyae’s genome size is approximately 5,353,044 base pairs, the bacteria stains Gram-negative, has a G+C content of 64.3%, and is non-motile. This bacteria has a pH optima of 6.8, but can survive in pH conditions ranging from 6.0 to 9.0. Additionally, its temperature optima is 28𝇈C, with a range of 13𝇈C-30𝇈C, and it is a slight halophilic (2-5% NaCl).
