= Sphingomonas ginsenosidimutans =

Scientific classification
- Domain: Bacteria
- Kingdom: Pseudomonadati
- Phylum: Pseudomonadota
- Class: Alphaproteobacteria
- Order: Sphingomonadales
- Family: Sphingomonadaceae
- Genus: Sphingomonas
- Species: S. ginsenosidimutans

Binomial name
- Sphingomonas ginsenosidimutans Choi et al. 2011

Type strain
- CIP 110393, Gsoil 1429, JCM 17074, KACC 14949, LMG 25799

Species of bacterium

Sphingomonas ginsenosidimutans is a Gram-negative, strictly aerobic, non-spore-forming and non-motile bacteria from the genus of Sphingomonas which has been isolated from soil from a ginseng field in Pocheon in Korea.
