= Sphingomonas stygia =

Scientific classification
- Domain: Bacteria
- Kingdom: Pseudomonadati
- Phylum: Pseudomonadota
- Class: Alphaproteobacteria
- Order: Sphingomonadales
- Family: Sphingomonadaceae
- Genus: Sphingomonas
- Species: S. stygia

Binomial name
- Sphingomonas stygia Balkwill et al. 1997

Synonyms
- Novosphingobium stygium (Takeuchi et al. 2001)

Species of bacterium

Sphingomonas stygia is a species of bacteria. It is an aromatic compound-degrading bacteria, it is gram-negative, non-spore-forming, non-motile and rod-shaped. It is found in deep-terrestrial-subsurface sediments.
