= Sphingomonas pituitosa =

Scientific classification
- Domain: Bacteria
- Kingdom: Pseudomonadati
- Phylum: Pseudomonadota
- Class: Alphaproteobacteria
- Order: Sphingomonadales
- Family: Sphingomonadaceae
- Genus: Sphingomonas
- Species: S. pituitosa

Binomial name
- Sphingomonas pituitosa Denner et al. 2001

Type strain
- CIP 106154, DSM 13101, EDIV, IAM 15276, JCM 21727, NBRC 102491, NCIMB 13868

Species of bacterium

Sphingomonas pituitosa is a Gram-negative, non-spore-forming, rod-shaped and motile bacteria from the genus Sphingomonas which has been isolated from water from a eutrophic artificial spring in Austria. Sphingomonas pituitosa produces exopolysaccharide.
