= Sphingomonas laterariae =

Scientific classification
- Domain: Bacteria
- Kingdom: Pseudomonadati
- Phylum: Pseudomonadota
- Class: Alphaproteobacteria
- Order: Sphingomonadales
- Family: Sphingomonadaceae
- Genus: Sphingomonas
- Species: S. laterariae

Binomial name
- Sphingomonas laterariae Kaur et al. 2012

Type strain
- CCM 7880, DSM 25432, LNB2, MTCC 10873

Species of bacterium

Sphingomonas laterariae is a Gram-negative, rod-shaped and non-motile bacteria from the genus Sphingomonas which has been isolated from a dump site which was contaminated with hexachlorocyclohexane in Ummari in India.
