= Sphingopyxis panaciterrae =

Scientific classification
- Domain: Bacteria
- Kingdom: Pseudomonadati
- Phylum: Pseudomonadota
- Class: Alphaproteobacteria
- Order: Sphingomonadales
- Family: Sphingomonadaceae
- Genus: Sphingopyxis
- Species: S. panaciterrae

Binomial name
- Sphingopyxis panaciterrae Lee et al. 2011

Type strain
- KCTC 12580, LMG 24003, Gsoil 124

Genus of bacteria

Sphingopyxis panaciterrae is a Gram-negative, strictly aerobic and motile bacterium from the genus of Sphingopyxis which has been isolated from soil from a ginseng field from Pocheon in Korea.
