= Sphingomonas oligophenolica =

Scientific classification
- Domain: Bacteria
- Kingdom: Pseudomonadati
- Phylum: Pseudomonadota
- Class: Alphaproteobacteria
- Order: Sphingomonadales
- Family: Sphingomonadaceae
- Genus: Sphingomonas
- Species: S. oligophenolica

Binomial name
- Sphingomonas oligophenolica Ohta et al. 2004

Type strain
- CCUG 56448, CIP 107926, DSM 17107, JCM 12082, S213

Species of bacterium

Sphingomonas oligophenolica is a Gram-negative, strictly aerobic and non-motile bacteria from the genus Sphingomonas which has been isolated from paddy field soil in Japan. Sphingomonas oligophenolica has the ability to degrade phenolic acids.
