= Sphingomonas abaci =

Scientific classification
- Domain: Bacteria
- Kingdom: Pseudomonadati
- Phylum: Pseudomonadota
- Class: Alphaproteobacteria
- Order: Sphingomonadales
- Family: Sphingomonadaceae
- Genus: Sphingomonas
- Species: S. abaci

Binomial name
- Sphingomonas abaci Busse et al. 2005

Type strain
- C42, CIP 109154, DSM 15867, LMG 21978

Species of bacterium

Sphingomonas abaci is a Gram-negative, rod-shaped and non-spore-forming bacteria from the genus Sphingomonas which has been isolated from an examination table from the University of Veterinary Medicine Vienna in Austria.
