= Sphingopyxis flavimaris =

Scientific classification
- Domain: Bacteria
- Kingdom: Pseudomonadati
- Phylum: Pseudomonadota
- Class: Alphaproteobacteria
- Order: Sphingomonadales
- Family: Sphingomonadaceae
- Genus: Sphingopyxis
- Species: S. flavimaris

Binomial name
- Sphingopyxis flavimaris Yoon & Oh 2005

Species of bacterium

Sphingopyxis flavimaris is a bacterium. It is Gram-negative, motile, yellow-pigmented and slightly halophilic. Its type strain is SW-151^{T} (=KCTC 12232^{T} =DSM 16223^{T}).

== Scientific Relevance ==
Sphingopyxis flavimaris is an example of the biotechnological potential of marine bacteria. Its ability to grow in saline environments and its specific lipid composition may be of interest for studies on microbial adaptation to extreme conditions, as well as for applications in bioremediation or the production of bioactive compounds.
