= Sphingomonas haloaromaticamans =

Scientific classification
- Domain: Bacteria
- Kingdom: Pseudomonadati
- Phylum: Pseudomonadota
- Class: Alphaproteobacteria
- Order: Sphingomonadales
- Family: Sphingomonadaceae
- Genus: Sphingomonas
- Species: S. haloaromaticamans

Binomial name
- Sphingomonas haloaromaticamans Wittich et al. 2007

Type strain
- A175 T, CCUG 53463, CIP 109723, DSM 13477, LMG 23801

Species of bacterium

Sphingomonas haloaromaticamans is a bacterium from the genus Sphingomonas which has been isolated from water and soil in the Netherlands. Sphingomonas haloaromaticamans has the ability to degrade 1,4-dichlorobenzene.
