= Rhizorhabdus wittichii =

Scientific classification
- Domain: Bacteria
- Kingdom: Pseudomonadati
- Phylum: Pseudomonadota
- Class: Alphaproteobacteria
- Order: Sphingomonadales
- Family: Sphingomonadaceae
- Genus: Rhizorhabdus
- Species: R. wittichii

Binomial name
- Rhizorhabdus wittichii (Yabuuchi et al. 2001) Hördt et al. 2020

Synonyms
- Sphingomonas wittichii Yabuuchi et al. 2001

Bacterial species

The species Rhizorhabdus wittichii, formerly Sphingomonas wittichii, is a Gram-negative, rod-shaped motile bacterium, with an optimum growth temperature at 30 °C. It forms a greyish white colony. It has been found to have a 67 mol% of DNA G+C content.

The R. wittichii RW1 genome consists of 5,915,246 bp and consists of a single circular chromosome and two plasmids.

== Background ==
It was first isolated from water of the River Elbe by R.-M. Wittich, after whom the species is named.

The species was originally thought to belong to the genus Sphingomonas, despite poor alignment of its 16S rRNA gene with its putative nearest neighbor. It has since been reclassified to Rhizorhabdus as part of a larger re-evaluation of Alphaproteobacteria.

== Strain(s) ==
Its type strain is R. wittichii RW1 DSM 6014T (= JCM 10273T = EY 4224T).

== Mechanism and biotechnological applications ==
R. wittichii RW1 is notable for metabolising dibenzo-p-dioxin and phenazine-1-carboxylic acid. In fact, Sphingomonas wittichii strain RW1 (RW1) is one of the very few strains that can grow on dibenzo-p-dioxin (DD). Furthermore, this bacterium also grows on dibenzofuran and 4-chloro-dibenzofuran, using them as the sole carbon sources. Such biodegradative capabilities are not unique to this strain.

R. wittichii MPO218 degrades ibuprofen, carrying degradative genes on a large plasmid. Thanks to its wide-ranging metabolic capabilities and likely propensity to acquire novel degradation genes, in no small part due to its wealth of plasmids,

The unusual arrangement of its genes involved in dioxin degradation, and the full description of the dioxin degradation pathway, is still under investigation.

This organism holds a high potential for biotechnological applications.
