= Sphingopyxis granuli =

Scientific classification
- Domain: Bacteria
- Kingdom: Pseudomonadati
- Phylum: Pseudomonadota
- Class: Alphaproteobacteria
- Order: Sphingomonadales
- Family: Sphingomonadaceae
- Genus: Sphingopyxis
- Species: S. granuli

Binomial name
- Sphingopyxis granuli Kim et al. 2011

Species of bacterium

Sphingopyxis granuli is a bacterium. It is a Gram-negative, non-spore-forming, rod-shaped bacterium. Its type strain is Kw07^{T} (= KCTC 12209^{T} = NBRC 100800^{T}).
