= Sphingomonas oligoaromativorans =

Scientific classification
- Domain: Bacteria
- Kingdom: Pseudomonadati
- Phylum: Pseudomonadota
- Class: Alphaproteobacteria
- Order: Sphingomonadales
- Family: Sphingomonadaceae
- Genus: Sphingomonas
- Species: S. oligoaromativorans

Binomial name
- Sphingomonas oligoaromativorans Han et al. 2014

Type strain
- CIP 107926, JCM 12082, S213

Species of bacterium

Sphingomonas oligoaromativorans is a Gram-negative, strictly aerobic, oligotrophic and non-motile bacteria from the genus Sphingomonas which has been isolated from humus forest soil in the Gyeryong Mountain National Park in Korea.
