= Sphingopyxis solisilvae =

Scientific classification
- Domain: Bacteria
- Kingdom: Pseudomonadati
- Phylum: Pseudomonadota
- Class: Alphaproteobacteria
- Order: Sphingomonadales
- Family: Sphingomonadaceae
- Genus: Sphingopyxis
- Species: S. solisilvae

Binomial name
- Sphingopyxis solisilvae Chaudhary et al. 2017

Type strain
- JCM 31675, KACC 19003, KEMB 9005-451, strain R366

Genus of bacteria

Sphingopyxis solisilvae is a Gram-negative, rod-shaped and motile bacterium from the genus of Sphingopyxis which has been isolated from forest soil from the Kyonggi University in Korea.
