= Sphingomonas kyeonggiensis =

Scientific classification
- Domain: Bacteria
- Kingdom: Pseudomonadati
- Phylum: Pseudomonadota
- Class: Alphaproteobacteria
- Order: Sphingomonadales
- Family: Sphingomonadaceae
- Genus: Sphingomonas
- Species: S. kyeonggiensis

Binomial name
- Sphingomonas kyeonggiensis Son et al. 2014

Type strain
- JCM 18825, KACC 17173, THG-DT81

Synonyms
- Sphingomonas kyeonggiense

Species of bacterium

Sphingomonas kyeonggiensis is a Gram-negative bacteria from the genus Sphingomonas which has been isolated from soil from a ginseng field in Pocheon in Korea. Based on current scientific literature, the pathogenicity of Sphingomonas kyeonggiensis is characterized as follows: Environmental Origin: The species was identified through a polyphasic taxonomic study of soil samples, indicating it is an environmental, rather than a primarily human-pathogenic, bacterium. National Institutes of Health (.gov) National Institutes of Health (.gov)

+3

Lack of Reported Human Disease: Unlike Sphingomonas paucimobilis or Sphingomonas koreensis—which are known opportunistic pathogens that can cause infections in humans, particularly in hospital settings—there are no documented cases in the provided search results of Sphingomonas kyeonggiensis causing illness in humans.

Characteristics: It is described as an aerobic, rod-shaped bacterium that grows optimally at 25–28°C.

While many Sphingomonas species are known to be useful in bioremediation (breaking down contaminants), some members of the genus are associated with infections. However, Sphingomonas kyeonggiensis is currently identified primarily for its presence in soil ecosystems.
