= Sphingopyxis fribergensis =

Scientific classification
- Domain: Bacteria
- Kingdom: Pseudomonadati
- Phylum: Pseudomonadota
- Class: Alphaproteobacteria
- Order: Sphingomonadales
- Family: Sphingomonadaceae
- Genus: Sphingopyxis
- Species: S. fribergensis

Binomial name
- Sphingopyxis fribergensis Oelschlagel et al. 2015

Type strain
- DSM 28731, LMG 28478, strain Kp5.2

Genus of bacteria

Sphingopyxis fribergensis is a Gram-negative and aerobic bacterium from the genus of Sphingopyxis which has been isolated from soil from a meadow from Freiberg in Germany.
