= Sphingomonas guangdongensis =

Scientific classification
- Domain: Bacteria
- Kingdom: Pseudomonadati
- Phylum: Pseudomonadota
- Class: Alphaproteobacteria
- Order: Sphingomonadales
- Family: Sphingomonadaceae
- Genus: Sphingomonas
- Species: S. guangdongensis

Binomial name
- Sphingomonas guangdongensis Feng et al. 2014

Type strain
- 9NM-8, CGMCC 1.12672, DSM 27570, GIMCC 1.653

Species of bacterium

Sphingomonas guangdongensis is a Gram-negative bacteria from the genus Sphingomonas which has been isolated from lead-zinc ore in Meizhou in the Guangdong province in China.
