= Sphingomonas naasensis =

Scientific classification
- Domain: Bacteria
- Kingdom: Pseudomonadati
- Phylum: Pseudomonadota
- Class: Alphaproteobacteria
- Order: Sphingomonadales
- Family: Sphingomonadaceae
- Genus: Sphingomonas
- Species: S. naasensis

Binomial name
- Sphingomonas naasensis Kim et al. 2014

Type strain
- KACC 16534, NBRC 108943, KIS18-15

Species of bacterium

Sphingomonas naasensis is a Gram-negative, aerobic and rod-shaped bacteria from the genus Sphingomonas with a polar flagellum which has been isolated from forest soil on the Baengnyeong Island in Korea.
