= Sphingomonas gimensis =

Scientific classification
- Domain: Bacteria
- Kingdom: Pseudomonadati
- Phylum: Pseudomonadota
- Class: Alphaproteobacteria
- Order: Sphingomonadales
- Family: Sphingomonadaceae
- Genus: Sphingomonas
- Species: S. gimensis

Binomial name
- Sphingomonas gimensis Feng et al. 2014

Type strain
- 9PNM-6, CGMCC 1.12671, DSM 27569

Species of bacterium

Sphingomonas gimensis is a Gram-negative and rod-shaped bacteria from the genus Sphingomonas which has been isolated from a lead and zinc mine in Meizhou in the Guangdong Province in China.
