= Sphingomonas pseudosanguinis =

Scientific classification
- Domain: Bacteria
- Kingdom: Pseudomonadati
- Phylum: Pseudomonadota
- Class: Alphaproteobacteria
- Order: Sphingomonadales
- Family: Sphingomonadaceae
- Genus: Sphingomonas
- Species: S. pseudosanguinis

Binomial name
- Sphingomonas pseudosanguinis Kämpfer et al. 2007

Type strain
- CCUG 54232, CIP 109431, DSM 19512, G1-2

Synonyms
- Sphingomonas intermedia

Species of bacterium

Sphingomonas pseudosanguinis is a bacterium from the genus Sphingomonas, which has been isolated from a humidifier in Germany.

Pathogenesis and Clinical Significance:

Source and Transmission: Similar to other Sphingomonas species, S. pseudosanguinis is an environmental bacterium commonly found in water and soil, frequently acting as a nosocomial contaminant in hospital settings, such as on catheters, ventilators, and hemodialysis devices.

Opportunistic Nature: It typically infects immunocompromised individuals or those with underlying chronic diseases, acting as an emerging pathogen.

Virulence Factors: Sphingomonas species possess an atypical cell wall structure, often lacking the typical lipopolysaccharide (LPS) endotoxins associated with high-virulence Gram-negative bacteria, instead containing sphingolipids (ceramide). This generally results in lower virulence, though they can still cause serious infections.

Pathology: The genus is known to produce biofilms, aiding survival in nutrient-poor water sources and contributing to its persistence in hospital infrastructure.

Clinical Syndromes: While specific clinical reports on S. pseudosanguinis are scarce compared to S. paucimobilis, members of this genus are associated with bloodstream infections (bacteremia), pneumonia, peritonitis, meningitis, and soft tissue infections.

Wikipedia

+6

Treatment: Sphingomonas species are generally susceptible to fluoroquinolones, carbapenems, and trimethoprim-sulfamethoxazole, while resistance to first-generation penicillins and cephalosporins is common.

Olympus Global

+1

Note: S. pseudosanguinis is closely related to S. sanguinis and S. yabuuchiae, and is known to inhabit similar environments.
