= Sphingomonas cynarae =

Scientific classification
- Domain: Bacteria
- Kingdom: Pseudomonadati
- Phylum: Pseudomonadota
- Class: Alphaproteobacteria
- Order: Sphingomonadales
- Family: Sphingomonadaceae
- Genus: Sphingomonas
- Species: S. cynarae

Binomial name
- Sphingomonas cynarae Talà et al. 2013

Type strain
- ITEM 13494, JCM 17498, SPC-1

Synonyms
- Sphingomonas cardui

Species of bacterium

Sphingomonas cynarae is a Gram-negative, non-spore-forming, rod-shaped and non-motile bacteria from the genus Sphingomonas which has been isolated from the phyllosphere of the plant Cynara cardunculus var. sylvestris in Lecce in Italy.
