= Sphingomonas aestuarii =

Scientific classification
- Domain: Bacteria
- Kingdom: Pseudomonadati
- Phylum: Pseudomonadota
- Class: Alphaproteobacteria
- Order: Sphingomonadales
- Family: Sphingomonadaceae
- Genus: Sphingomonas
- Species: S. aestuarii

Binomial name
- Sphingomonas aestuarii Roh et al. 2009

Type strain
- CIP 110056, DSM 19415, DSM 19475, K4, KCTC 22050

Species of bacterium

Sphingomonas aestuarii is a Gram-negative and rod-shaped bacteria from the genus Sphingomonas which has been isolated from tidal flat sediments in Yeosu in Korea.
