= Sphingopyxis indica =

Scientific classification
- Domain: Bacteria
- Kingdom: Pseudomonadati
- Phylum: Pseudomonadota
- Class: Alphaproteobacteria
- Order: Sphingomonadales
- Family: Sphingomonadaceae
- Genus: Sphingopyxis
- Species: S. indica

Binomial name
- Sphingopyxis indica Jindal et al. 2013

Type strain
- CCM 7542, MCC 2023, MTCC 9455, strain DS15

Genus of bacteria

Sphingopyxis indica is a Gram-negative, aerobic, non-spore-forming, rod-shaped and non-motile bacterium from the genus of Sphingopyxis.
