= Sphingomonas dokdonensis =

Scientific classification
- Domain: Bacteria
- Kingdom: Pseudomonadati
- Phylum: Pseudomonadota
- Class: Alphaproteobacteria
- Order: Sphingomonadales
- Family: Sphingomonadaceae
- Genus: Sphingomonas
- Species: S. dokdonensis

Binomial name
- Sphingomonas dokdonensis Yoon et al. 2006

Type strain
- CIP 108841, DS-4, KCTC 12541

Species of bacterium

Sphingomonas dokdonensis is a Gram-negative and rod-shaped bacteria from the genus Sphingomonas which has been isolated from soil from the Liancourt Rocks in Korea.
