= Sphingomonas hankookensis =

Scientific classification
- Domain: Bacteria
- Kingdom: Pseudomonadati
- Phylum: Pseudomonadota
- Class: Alphaproteobacteria
- Order: Sphingomonadales
- Family: Sphingomonadaceae
- Genus: Sphingomonas
- Species: S. hankookensis

Binomial name
- Sphingomonas hankookensis Yoon et al. 2009

Type strain
- CCUG 57509, KCTC 22579, ODN7

Species of bacterium

Sphingomonas hankookensis is a species of Gram-negative, rod-shaped and non-motile bacteria from the genus Sphingomonas which has been isolated from wastewater from a wastewater treatment plant in Taejon in Korea.
