= Sphingopyxis soli =

Scientific classification
- Domain: Bacteria
- Kingdom: Pseudomonadati
- Phylum: Pseudomonadota
- Class: Alphaproteobacteria
- Order: Sphingomonadales
- Family: Sphingomonadaceae
- Genus: Sphingopyxis
- Species: S. soli

Binomial name
- Sphingopyxis soli Choi et al. 2010

Type strain
- JCM 15910, KCTC 22405, strain BL03

Genus of bacteria

Sphingopyxis soli is a Gram-negative, aerobic, rod-shaped and motile bacterium from the genus of Sphingopyxis which has been isolated from landfill soil from Pohang in Korea.
