= Sphingomonas japonica =

Scientific classification
- Domain: Bacteria
- Kingdom: Pseudomonadati
- Phylum: Pseudomonadota
- Class: Alphaproteobacteria
- Order: Sphingomonadales
- Family: Sphingomonadaceae
- Genus: Sphingomonas
- Species: S. japonica

Binomial name
- Sphingomonas japonica Romanenko et al. 2009

Type strain
- CIP 110395, JCM 15438, KC7, KMM 3038, NRIC 0738

Species of bacterium

Sphingomonas japonica is a bacterium from the genus Sphingomonas which has been isolated from the crab Paralithodes camtschaticus in the Peter the Great Bay in Russia.
