= Sphingomonas yunnanensis =

Scientific classification
- Domain: Bacteria
- Kingdom: Pseudomonadati
- Phylum: Pseudomonadota
- Class: Alphaproteobacteria
- Order: Sphingomonadales
- Family: Sphingomonadaceae
- Genus: Sphingomonas
- Species: S. yunnanensis

Binomial name
- Sphingomonas yunnanensis Zhang et al. 2005

Species of bacterium

Sphingomonas yunnanensis is a species of bacterium. Its cells are short-rod-shaped and motile. Its type strain is YIM 003T (=CCTCC AB 204064T=KCTC 12346T).
