= Sphingomonas panni =

Scientific classification
- Domain: Bacteria
- Kingdom: Pseudomonadati
- Phylum: Pseudomonadota
- Class: Alphaproteobacteria
- Order: Sphingomonadales
- Family: Sphingomonadaceae
- Genus: Sphingomonas
- Species: S. panni

Binomial name
- Sphingomonas panni Busse et al. 2005

Type strain
- C52, CIP 109155, DSM 15761, LMG 21979

Species of bacterium

Sphingomonas panni is a Gram-negative, non-spore-forming and rod-shaped bacteria from the genus Sphingomonas which has been isolated from a sponge from an examination room in the University for Veterinary Medicine Vienna in Austria.
