= Sphingomonas roseiflava =

Scientific classification
- Domain: Bacteria
- Kingdom: Pseudomonadati
- Phylum: Pseudomonadota
- Class: Alphaproteobacteria
- Order: Sphingomonadales
- Family: Sphingomonadaceae
- Genus: Sphingomonas
- Species: S. roseiflava

Binomial name
- Sphingomonas roseiflava Yun et al. 2000

Type strain
- CIP 106847, CIP 106886, DSM 15593, GTC 1968, IAM 14823, JCM 21329, JCM 99038, MK341

Species of bacterium

Sphingomonas roseiflava is a bacterium from the genus Sphingomonas which has been isolated from the plant Setaria viridis in the Ibaraki Prefecture in Japan.
