= Sphingomonas psychrolutea =

Scientific classification
- Domain: Bacteria
- Kingdom: Pseudomonadati
- Phylum: Pseudomonadota
- Class: Alphaproteobacteria
- Order: Sphingomonadales
- Family: Sphingomonadaceae
- Genus: Sphingomonas
- Species: S. psychrolutea

Binomial name
- Sphingomonas psychrolutea Liu et al. 2015

Type strain
- CGMCC 1.10106, NBRC 109639, MDB1-A

Species of bacterium

Sphingomonas psychrolutea is a Gram-negative, rod-shaped, aerobic and psychrotolerant bacteria from the genus Sphingomonas which has been isolated from the Midui glacier in Tibet in China.
