= Sphingobium francense =

Scientific classification
- Domain: Bacteria
- Kingdom: Pseudomonadati
- Phylum: Pseudomonadota
- Class: Alphaproteobacteria
- Order: Sphingomonadales
- Family: Sphingomonadaceae
- Genus: Sphingobium
- Species: S. francense

Binomial name
- Sphingobium francense Pal et al. 2005

Species of bacterium

Sphingobium francense is a hexachlorocyclohexane-degrading bacteria with type strain MTCC 6363^{T} (=CCM 7288^{T}).
