= Sphingomonas aerophila =

Scientific classification
- Domain: Bacteria
- Kingdom: Pseudomonadati
- Phylum: Pseudomonadota
- Class: Alphaproteobacteria
- Order: Sphingomonadales
- Family: Sphingomonadaceae
- Genus: Sphingomonas
- Species: S. aerophila

Binomial name
- Sphingomonas aerophila Kim et al. 2014

Type strain
- KACC 16533, NBRC 108942, 5413J-26

Species of bacterium

Sphingomonas aerophila is a Gram-negative and aerobic bacteria from the genus Sphingomonas which has been isolated from air from the Jeju Island in Korea.
