= Sphingomonas aerolata =

Scientific classification
- Domain: Bacteria
- Kingdom: Pseudomonadati
- Phylum: Pseudomonadota
- Class: Alphaproteobacteria
- Order: Sphingomonadales
- Family: Sphingomonadaceae
- Genus: Sphingomonas
- Species: S. aerolata

Binomial name
- Sphingomonas aerolata Busse et al. 2003

Type strain
- Busse NW12, CCUG 48435, CIP 108369, DSM 14746, LMG 21376, NW12

Species of bacterium

Sphingomonas aerolata is a Gram-negative and psychrotolerant bacteria from the genus Sphingomonas.

Any type of Sphingomonas genus bacteria are found in a wide variety of habitats in which can include: soil, fresh and marine water, plant roots, and sediments. The Sphingomonas aerolata species is known to be a gram-negative strain with the cells being small rods that are psychrotolerant. When conducting tests for Sphingomonas aerolata, catalase and oxidase were positive, and the nitrate wasn’t reduced. In the study conducted by Domitille Jarrige, the Sphingomonas aerolata bacterium was isolated from cloud water for sequencing. Within this study, the Sphingomonas aerolata had a GC content of 66%, a chromosome of 3.99 Mbp long, along with 3 plasmids. During this study, it was also noted to have features of rhodospin encoding genes in which act like a proton to use as light energy.
