= Sphingomonas azotifigens =

Scientific classification
- Domain: Bacteria
- Kingdom: Pseudomonadati
- Phylum: Pseudomonadota
- Class: Alphaproteobacteria
- Order: Sphingomonadales
- Family: Sphingomonadaceae
- Genus: Sphingomonas
- Species: S. azotifigens

Binomial name
- Sphingomonas azotifigens Xie and Yokota 2006

Type strain
- CCTCC AB205007, CIP 109209, DSM 18530, IAM 15283, IFO 15497, JCM 21734, NBRC 15497, Y39

Synonyms
- Sphingomonas azotofixans

Species of bacterium

Sphingomonas azotifigens is a nitrogen-fixing bacteria from the genus Sphingomonas which has been isolated from the root of a rice plant (Oryza sativa) in Mishima in Japan.
