= Sphingomonas sanxanigenens =

Scientific classification
- Domain: Bacteria
- Kingdom: Pseudomonadati
- Phylum: Pseudomonadota
- Class: Alphaproteobacteria
- Order: Sphingomonadales
- Family: Sphingomonadaceae
- Genus: Sphingomonas
- Species: S. sanxanigenens

Binomial name
- Sphingomonas sanxanigenens Huang et al. 2009

Type strain
- CGMCC 1.6417, CIP 110406, DSM 19645, NX02

Species of bacterium

Sphingomonas sanxanigenens is a Gram-negative, non-spore-forming and rod-shaped bacteria from the genus Sphingomonas which has been isolated from soil from a cornfield from Xinhe County in China.
