= Sphingomonas kyungheensis =

Scientific classification
- Domain: Bacteria
- Kingdom: Pseudomonadati
- Phylum: Pseudomonadota
- Class: Alphaproteobacteria
- Order: Sphingomonadales
- Family: Sphingomonadaceae
- Genus: Sphingomonas
- Species: S. kyungheensis

Binomial name
- Sphingomonas kyungheensis Son et al. 2013

Type strain
- KACC 16224, LMG 26582, THG-B283

Species of bacterium

Sphingomonas kyungheensis is a Gram-negative, aerobic and motile bacteria from the genus Sphingomonas with a polar flagellum which has been isolated from soil from a ginseng field.
