= Sphingomonas aurantiaca =

Scientific classification
- Domain: Bacteria
- Kingdom: Pseudomonadati
- Phylum: Pseudomonadota
- Class: Alphaproteobacteria
- Order: Sphingomonadales
- Family: Sphingomonadaceae
- Genus: Sphingomonas
- Species: S. aurantiaca

Binomial name
- Sphingomonas aurantiaca Busse et al. 2003

Type strain
- CCUG 48749, CIP 108368, DSM 14748, LMG 21377, MA101b

Species of bacterium

Sphingomonas aurantiaca is a Gram-negative and psychrotolerant bacteria from the genus Sphingomonas which has been isolated from indoor dusts from animal sheds in Finland.
