= Sphingomonas daechungensis =

Scientific classification
- Domain: Bacteria
- Kingdom: Pseudomonadati
- Phylum: Pseudomonadota
- Class: Alphaproteobacteria
- Order: Sphingomonadales
- Family: Sphingomonadaceae
- Genus: Sphingomonas
- Species: S. daechungensis

Binomial name
- Sphingomonas daechungensis Huy et al. 2014

Type strain
- CH15-11, JCM 17887, KCTC 23718

Species of bacterium

Sphingomonas daechungensis is a Gram-negative, non-spore-forming, aerobic and non-motile bacteria from the genus Sphingomonas which has been isolated from sediments of the Daechung water reservoir in Korea.
