= Sphingomonas elodea =

Scientific classification
- Domain: Bacteria
- Kingdom: Pseudomonadati
- Phylum: Pseudomonadota
- Class: Alphaproteobacteria
- Order: Sphingomonadales
- Family: Sphingomonadaceae
- Genus: Sphingomonas
- Species: S. elodea

Binomial name
- Sphingomonas elodea Vartak et al., 1995

Synonyms
- Pseudomonas elodea Kang et al., 1982

Species of bacterium

Sphingomonas elodea is a species of bacteria in the genus Sphingomonas.

This species is important to humans due to the fact that it produces gellan gum, a suitable agar substitute as a gelling agent in various clinical bacteriological media and especially important for the culture growth of thermophilic microorganisms in solid media. When the gellan gum-producing bacterium was first isolated from a natural lily pond it was classified as Pseudomonas elodea based on the taxonomic classification of that time. However, the gellan gum-producing bacterium was subsequently re-classified as Sphingomonas elodea based on the current taxonomic classification.

Sphingomonas elodea metabolizes maltodextrin (oligosaccharides of glucose) externally into glucose by the putative exo-acting glucosidase. Sphingomonas elodea utilizes the Entner-Doudoroff pathway for glucose metabolism.
