= Sphingomonas koreensis =

Scientific classification
- Domain: Bacteria
- Kingdom: Pseudomonadati
- Phylum: Pseudomonadota
- Class: Alphaproteobacteria
- Order: Sphingomonadales
- Family: Sphingomonadaceae
- Genus: Sphingomonas
- Species: S. koreensis

Binomial name
- Sphingomonas koreensis Lee et al. 2001

Type strain
- CIP 107740, DSM 15582, IFO 16142, IFO 16723, JCM 11456, JSS26, KCCM 41066, KCCM 41067, KCCM 41069, KCTC 2882, NBRC 16142, NBRC 16723, NBRL 16723

Species of bacterium

Sphingomonas koreensis is a Gram-negative and aerobic bacteria from the genus Sphingomonas which has been isolated from natural mineral water in Taejon in Korea. In one patient, with a meningeal drain, Sphingomonas koreensis was reported to cause meningitis.
