= Sphingomonas astaxanthinifaciens =

Scientific classification
- Domain: Bacteria
- Kingdom: Pseudomonadati
- Phylum: Pseudomonadota
- Class: Alphaproteobacteria
- Order: Sphingomonadales
- Family: Sphingomonadaceae
- Genus: Sphingomonas
- Species: S. astaxanthinifaciens

Binomial name
- Sphingomonas astaxanthinifaciens Asker et al. 2008

Type strain
- CCUG 53608, NBRC 102146, TDMA-17

Species of bacterium

Sphingomonas astaxanthinifaciens is a bacterium from the genus [[[Sphingomonas]] which has been isolated from fresh water in Misasa in Japan. Sphingomonas astaxanthinifaciens has the ability to produce astaxanthin.
