= Sphingomonas asaccharolytica =

Scientific classification
- Domain: Bacteria
- Kingdom: Pseudomonadati
- Phylum: Pseudomonadota
- Class: Alphaproteobacteria
- Order: Sphingomonadales
- Family: Sphingomonadaceae
- Genus: Sphingomonas
- Species: S. asaccharolytica

Binomial name
- Sphingomonas asaccharolytica Takeuchi et al. 1995

Type strain
- ATCC 51839, BCRC 17404, CCRC 17404, CIP 107363, DSM 10564, HAMBI 2139, IAM 14458, IFO 15499, JCM 21229, KCTC 2825, LMG 17330, LMG 17539, NBRC 15499, NCIMB 13747, Y-345

Synonyms
- Sphingomonas saccharolytica

Species of bacterium

Sphingomonas asaccharolytica is a bacterium from the genus Sphingomonas which has been isolated from roots from an apple tree in Japan.
