= Sphingopyxis witflariensis =

Scientific classification
- Domain: Bacteria
- Kingdom: Pseudomonadati
- Phylum: Pseudomonadota
- Class: Alphaproteobacteria
- Order: Sphingomonadales
- Family: Sphingomonadaceae
- Genus: Sphingopyxis
- Species: S. witflariensis

Binomial name
- Sphingopyxis witflariensis Kämpfer et al. 2002

Type strain
- CIP 107174, DSM 14551, strain W-50

Genus of bacteria

Sphingopyxis witflariensis is a Gram-negative and strictly aerobic bacterium from the genus of Sphingopyxis which has been isolated from activated sludge from Wetzlar in Germany.
