= Sphingomonas morindae =

Scientific classification
- Domain: Bacteria
- Kingdom: Pseudomonadati
- Phylum: Pseudomonadota
- Class: Alphaproteobacteria
- Order: Sphingomonadales
- Family: Sphingomonadaceae
- Genus: Sphingomonas
- Species: S. morindae

Binomial name
- Sphingomonas morindae Liu et al. 2015

Type strain
- CICC 10879, DSM 29151, KCTC 42183, NBD5, NBD8

Species of bacterium

Sphingomonas morindae is a Gram-negative, aerobic, short rod-shaped, non-spore-forming and non-motile bacteria from the genus Sphingomonas which has been isolated from the inner tissue of the plant Morinda citrifolia in Sanya on Hainan in China.
