= Sphingomonas melonis =

Scientific classification
- Domain: Bacteria
- Kingdom: Pseudomonadati
- Phylum: Pseudomonadota
- Class: Alphaproteobacteria
- Order: Sphingomonadales
- Family: Sphingomonadaceae
- Genus: Sphingomonas
- Species: S. melonis

Binomial name
- Sphingomonas melonis Buonaurio et al. 2002

Type strain
- BCRC 17459, CCRC 17459, CIP 107880, DAPP-PG 224, DSM 14444, DSMZ 14444 T, EY 4350, LMG 19484, NCPPB 4320, PG-224

Species of bacterium

Sphingomonas melonis is a bacterium from the genus Sphingomonas which has been isolated from the plant Cucumis melo var. inodorus in Madrid in Spain. Sphingomonas melonis can cause brown spots on melon fruits from the melon plant (Cucumis melo var. inodorus). In rice plants it can have disease-preventing effects, the seed-endophytic strain Sphingomonas melonis ZJ26 that can be naturally enriched in certain rice cultivars, confers diseases resistance against a bacterial pathogen and is vertically transmitted among plant generations via their seeds.
