= Sphingomonas abikonensis =

Scientific classification
- Domain: Bacteria
- Kingdom: Pseudomonadati
- Phylum: Pseudomonadota
- Class: Alphaproteobacteria
- Order: Sphingomonadales
- Family: Sphingomonadaceae
- Genus: Sphingomonas
- Species: S. abikonensis

Binomial name
- Sphingomonas abikonensis

Synonyms
- Pseudomonas abikonensis

Species of bacterium

Sphingomonas abikonensis is a species of Gram-negative bacteria. Following 16S rRNA phylogenetic analysis, it was determined that the organism formerly classified as 'P.' abikonensis belonged in the Sphingomonas rRNA lineage. It is capable of forming freshwater biofilms.
