= Sphingomonas xinjiangensis =

Scientific classification
- Domain: Bacteria
- Kingdom: Pseudomonadati
- Phylum: Pseudomonadota
- Class: Alphaproteobacteria
- Order: Sphingomonadales
- Family: Sphingomonadaceae
- Genus: Sphingomonas
- Species: S. xinjiangensis

Binomial name
- Sphingomonas xinjiangensis An et al. 2011

Type strain
- CCTCC AB 208035, NRRL B-51332, 10-1-84

Species of bacterium

Sphingomonas xinjiangensis is a Gram-negative, aerobic and motile bacteria from the genus Sphingomonas, which has been isolated from the desert sand of Xinjiang in China.
