= Sphingomonas flava =

Scientific classification
- Domain: Bacteria
- Kingdom: Pseudomonadati
- Phylum: Pseudomonadota
- Class: Alphaproteobacteria
- Order: Sphingomonadales
- Family: Sphingomonadaceae
- Genus: Sphingomonas
- Species: S. flava

Binomial name
- Sphingomonas flava Du et al. 2015

Species of bacterium

Sphingomonas flava is a Gram-negative, strictly aerobic, rod-shaped and non-motile bacteria from the genus Sphingomonas which has been isolated from soil from Yongin-si from the Gyeonggi Province in Korea.
