= Sphingopyxis bauzanensis =

Scientific classification
- Domain: Bacteria
- Kingdom: Pseudomonadati
- Phylum: Pseudomonadota
- Class: Alphaproteobacteria
- Order: Sphingomonadales
- Family: Sphingomonadaceae
- Genus: Sphingopyxis
- Species: S. bauzanensis

Binomial name
- Sphingopyxis bauzanensis Zhang et al. 2010

Species of bacterium

Sphingopyxis bauzanensis is a bacterium. It is Gram-negative, aerobic and psychrophilic. The type strain is BZ30^{T} (=5DSM 22271^{T} =5CGMCC 1.8959^{T} =5CIP 110136^{T}).
