= Sphingomonas jinjuensis =

Scientific classification
- Domain: Bacteria
- Kingdom: Pseudomonadati
- Phylum: Pseudomonadota
- Class: Alphaproteobacteria
- Order: Sphingomonadales
- Family: Sphingomonadaceae
- Genus: Sphingomonas
- Species: S. jinjuensis

Binomial name
- Sphingomonas jinjuensis Chung et al. 2011

Type strain
- CIP 110411, DSM 21457, KCTC 22477, YC6723

Species of bacterium

Sphingomonas jinjuensis is a Gram-negative and rod-shaped bacteria from the genus Sphingomonas which has been isolated from rhizosphere soil from a rice field in Jinju in Korea.
