= Sphingomonas adhaesiva =

Scientific classification
- Domain: Bacteria
- Kingdom: Pseudomonadati
- Phylum: Pseudomonadota
- Class: Alphaproteobacteria
- Order: Sphingomonadales
- Family: Sphingomonadaceae
- Genus: Sphingomonas
- Species: S. adhaesiva

Binomial name
- Sphingomonas adhaesiva Yabuuchi et al. 1990

Species of bacterium

Sphingomonas adhaesiva is a species of bacteria. Its type strain is JCM 7370 (= GIFU 11458). The cells are rods and it has one polar flagellum. It is aerobic.
