= Sphingomonas endophytica =

Scientific classification
- Domain: Bacteria
- Kingdom: Pseudomonadati
- Phylum: Pseudomonadota
- Class: Alphaproteobacteria
- Order: Sphingomonadales
- Family: Sphingomonadaceae
- Genus: Sphingomonas
- Species: S. endophytica

Binomial name
- Sphingomonas endophytica Huang et al. 2012

Type strain
- CCTCC AA 209035, JCM 17394, YIM 65583

Species of bacterium

Sphingomonas endophytica is a Gram-negative bacteria from the genus Sphingomonas which has been isolated from the root of the plant Artemisia annua in the Yunnan province in China.
