= Sphingomonas vulcanisoli =

Scientific classification
- Domain: Bacteria
- Kingdom: Pseudomonadati
- Phylum: Pseudomonadota
- Class: Alphaproteobacteria
- Order: Sphingomonadales
- Family: Sphingomonadaceae
- Genus: Sphingomonas
- Species: S. vulcanisoli

Binomial name
- Sphingomonas vulcanisoli Lee et al. 2015

Species of bacterium

Sphingomonas vulcanisoli is a Gram-negative, rod-shaped and non-motile bacteria from the genus Sphingomonas which has been isolated from soil of the Gotjawal Forest in Korea.
