= Sphingomonas histidinilytica =

Scientific classification
- Domain: Bacteria
- Kingdom: Pseudomonadati
- Phylum: Pseudomonadota
- Class: Alphaproteobacteria
- Order: Sphingomonadales
- Family: Sphingomonadaceae
- Genus: Sphingomonas
- Species: S. histidinilytica

Binomial name
- Sphingomonas histidinilytica Nigam et al. 2010

Type strain
- CCM 7545, MTCC 9473, UM2

Species of bacterium

Sphingomonas histidinilytica is a Gram-negative and non-spore-forming bacteria from the genus Sphingomonas which has been isolated from hexachlorocyclohexane contaminated soil from a dump site in Ummari near Lucknow in Uttar Pradesh in India.
