= Sphingopyxis ummariensis =

Scientific classification
- Domain: Bacteria
- Kingdom: Pseudomonadati
- Phylum: Pseudomonadota
- Class: Alphaproteobacteria
- Order: Sphingomonadales
- Family: Sphingomonadaceae
- Genus: Sphingopyxis
- Species: S. ummariensis

Binomial name
- Sphingopyxis ummariensis Sharma et al. 2010

Species of bacterium

Sphingopyxis ummariensis is a bacterium. It is Gram-negative, motile, rod-shaped and yellow-pigmented. The type strain is UI2^{T} (=CCM 7428^{T} =MTCC 8591^{T}).
