= Sphingomonas ginsengisoli =

Scientific classification
- Domain: Bacteria
- Kingdom: Pseudomonadati
- Phylum: Pseudomonadota
- Class: Alphaproteobacteria
- Order: Sphingomonadales
- Family: Sphingomonadaceae
- Genus: Sphingomonas
- Species: S. ginsengisoli

Binomial name
- Sphingomonas ginsengisoli An et al. 2013

Type strain
- DSM 18094, Gsoil 634, KCTC 12630, LMG 23739

Species of bacterium

Sphingomonas ginsengisoli is a bacterium from the genus Sphingomonas which has been isolated from soil from a ginseng field in Pocheon in Korea.
