= Sphingomonas desiccabilis =

Scientific classification
- Domain: Bacteria
- Kingdom: Pseudomonadati
- Phylum: Pseudomonadota
- Class: Alphaproteobacteria
- Order: Sphingomonadales
- Family: Sphingomonadaceae
- Genus: Sphingomonas
- Species: S. desiccabilis

Binomial name
- Sphingomonas desiccabilis Reddy and Garcia-Pichel 2007

Type strain
- ATCC BAA-1041, CIP 110412, CP1D, DSM 16792

Species of bacterium

Sphingomonas desiccabilis is a Gram-negative and non-motile bacterium from the genus Sphingomonas which has been isolated from biological soil crusts in the Colorado Plateau in the United States. It has been sent on the International Space Station in 2019 and 2020 for the BioRock and BioAsteroid experiments, respectively.
