= Sphingomonas echinoides =

Scientific classification
- Domain: Bacteria
- Kingdom: Pseudomonadati
- Phylum: Pseudomonadota
- Class: Alphaproteobacteria
- Order: Sphingomonadales
- Family: Sphingomonadaceae
- Genus: Sphingomonas
- Species: S. echinoides

Binomial name
- Sphingomonas echinoides (Heumann 1962); Denner et al. 1999

Synonyms
- Pseudomonas echinoides Heumann 1962

Species of bacterium

Sphingomonas echinoides is a Gram-negative soil bacterium.
