= Sphingomonas glacialis =

Scientific classification
- Domain: Bacteria
- Kingdom: Pseudomonadati
- Phylum: Pseudomonadota
- Class: Alphaproteobacteria
- Order: Sphingomonadales
- Family: Sphingomonadaceae
- Genus: Sphingomonas
- Species: S. glacialis

Binomial name
- Sphingomonas glacialis Zhang et al. 2011

Type strain
- C16y, CGMCC 1.8957, CIP 11013, CIP 110131, DSM 22294

Species of bacterium

Sphingomonas glacialis is a Gram-positive, rod-shaped, psychrophilic and non-motile bacteria from the genus Sphingomonas which has been isolated from cryoconite from the Stubai Glacier in Tyrol in Austria.
