= Sphingomonas jejuensis =

Scientific classification
- Domain: Bacteria
- Kingdom: Pseudomonadati
- Phylum: Pseudomonadota
- Class: Alphaproteobacteria
- Order: Sphingomonadales
- Family: Sphingomonadaceae
- Genus: Sphingomonas
- Species: S. jejuensis

Binomial name
- Sphingomonas jejuensis Park et al. 2012

Type strain
- KCTC 23321, NBRC 107775, MS-31

Species of bacterium

Sphingomonas jejuensis is a Gram-negative, rod-shaped and non-motile bacteria from the genus of Sphingomonas which has been isolated from the sponge Hymeniacidon flavia near the Jeju Island in Korea.
