= Sphingomonas sediminicola =

Scientific classification
- Domain: Bacteria
- Kingdom: Pseudomonadati
- Phylum: Pseudomonadota
- Class: Alphaproteobacteria
- Order: Sphingomonadales
- Family: Sphingomonadaceae
- Genus: Sphingomonas
- Species: S. sediminicola

Binomial name
- Sphingomonas sediminicola An et al. 2013

Type strain
- Dae 20, DSM 18106, KCTC 12629, LMG 23592

Species of bacterium

Sphingomonas sediminicola is a bacterium of the genus Sphingomonas, isolated from freshwater sediments of the Daecheong Bank near Daejeon in Korea.
