= Sphingomonas gei =

Scientific classification
- Domain: Bacteria
- Kingdom: Pseudomonadati
- Phylum: Pseudomonadota
- Class: Alphaproteobacteria
- Order: Sphingomonadales
- Family: Sphingomonadaceae
- Genus: Sphingomonas
- Species: S. gei

Binomial name
- Sphingomonas gei Zhu et al. 2015

Type strain
- CCTCC AB 2013306, KCTC 32449, ZFGT-11

Species of bacterium

Sphingomonas gei is a Gram-negative, strictly aerobic and motile bacteria from the genus Sphingomonas with a single polar flagellum which has been isolated from roots of the plant Geum aleppicum from the Mount Taibai in the Shaanxi Province in China.
