= Sphingomonas lacus =

Scientific classification
- Domain: Bacteria
- Kingdom: Pseudomonadati
- Phylum: Pseudomonadota
- Class: Alphaproteobacteria
- Order: Sphingomonadales
- Family: Sphingomonadaceae
- Genus: Sphingomonas
- Species: S. lacus

Binomial name
- Sphingomonas lacus Kim et al. 2015

Type strain
- CECT 8383, KCTC 32458, PB304

Species of bacterium

Sphingomonas lacus is a Gram-negative, aerobic and motile bacteria from the genus Sphingomonas which has been isolated from soil near a pond in Daejeon in Korea. Sphingomonas lacus produces astaxanthin-dideoxyglycoside.
