= Sphingopyxis flava =

Scientific classification
- Domain: Bacteria
- Kingdom: Pseudomonadati
- Phylum: Pseudomonadota
- Class: Alphaproteobacteria
- Order: Sphingomonadales
- Family: Sphingomonadaceae
- Genus: Sphingopyxis
- Species: S. flava

Binomial name
- Sphingopyxis flava Verma et al. 2015

Type strain
- DSM 28472, MCC 2778, strain R11H

Genus of bacteria

Sphingopyxis flava is a Gram-staining, aerobic, non-spore-forming, rod-shaped and non-motile bacterium from the genus of Sphingopyxis which has been isolated from soil from a dumpsite which was contaminated with hexachlorocyclohexane from Ummari in India.
