= Sphingomonas fennica =

Scientific classification
- Domain: Bacteria
- Kingdom: Pseudomonadati
- Phylum: Pseudomonadota
- Class: Alphaproteobacteria
- Order: Sphingomonadales
- Family: Sphingomonadaceae
- Genus: Sphingomonas
- Species: S. fennica

Binomial name
- Sphingomonas fennica Wittich et al. 2007

Type strain
- CCUG 53462, CIP 109722, DSM 13665, K101, LMG 23802

Species of bacterium

Sphingomonas fennica is a bacterium from the genus Sphingomonas which has been isolated from groundwater, which was collected near a sawmill in Finland.
