= Sphingomonas parapaucimobilis =

Scientific classification
- Domain: Bacteria
- Kingdom: Pseudomonadati
- Phylum: Pseudomonadota
- Class: Alphaproteobacteria
- Order: Sphingomonadales
- Family: Sphingomonadaceae
- Genus: Sphingomonas
- Species: S. parapaucimobilis

Binomial name
- Sphingomonas parapaucimobilis Yabuuchi et al. 1990

Species of bacterium

Sphingomonas parapaucimobilis is a species of bacteria. Its type strain is JCM 7510 (= GIFU 11387).
