= Facivitalis =

Scientific classification
- Domain: Bacteria
- Kingdom: Pseudomonadati
- Phylum: Pseudomonadota
- Class: Alphaproteobacteria
- Order: Sphingomonadales
- Family: Sphingomonadaceae
- Genus: Facivitalis; Arkan-Ozdemir et al. 2025
- Species: F. istanbulensis

Binomial name
- Facivitalis istanbulensis Arkan-Ozdemir et al. 2025

Species of bacterium

Facivitalis is a genus of gram-negative bacterium in the family Sphingomonadaceae, containing the single species F. istanbulensis. The species was discovered as a result of the analysis of aviation fuels in 2025. It is resistant to environmental conditions and can adapt to extraordinary situations. The generic name refers to its discovery in aviation fuel and the specific name to its association to Istanbul University.

== Discovery ==
Experiments were conducted by examining aviation fuel purchased from an aircraft company. The researchers' goal was to isolate a "manganese oxidizing" bacterium and conduct microbiological corrosion experiments. The bacterium's genome contains 58 genes related to mechanisms for breaking down aromatic hydrocarbons.
