= Blastomonas =

Scientific classification
- Domain: Bacteria
- Kingdom: Pseudomonadati
- Phylum: Pseudomonadota
- Class: Alphaproteobacteria
- Order: Sphingomonadales
- Family: Sphingomonadaceae
- Genus: Blastomonas; Sly and Cahill 1997

Type species
- Blastomonas natatoria (Sly 1985) Sly and Cahill 1997

Species
- Blastomonas aquatica Xiao et al. 2015; Blastomonas fulva Lee et al. 2017; Blastomonas marina Meng et al. 2017; Blastomonas natatoria (Sly 1985) Sly and Cahill 1997; Blastomonas quesadae Castro et al. 2017; Blastomonas ursincola (Yurkov et al. 1997) Hiraishi et al. 2000

Synonyms
- Erythromonas Yurkov et al. 1997

Genus of bacteria

Blastomonas is a Gram-negative, photoheterotrophic, strictly aerobic and non-spore-forming bacteria genus from the family Sphingomonadaceae.
