= Novosphingopyxis baekryungensis =

Scientific classification
- Domain: Bacteria
- Kingdom: Pseudomonadati
- Phylum: Pseudomonadota
- Class: Alphaproteobacteria
- Order: Sphingomonadales
- Family: Sphingomonadaceae
- Genus: Novosphingopyxis
- Species: N. baekryungensis

Binomial name
- Novosphingopyxis baekryungensis (Yoon et al. 2005) Feng et al. 2020

Type strain
- DSM 16222; KCTC 12231; SW-150

Synonyms
- Sphingopyxis baekryungensis Yoon et al. 2005; Elkelangia baekryungensis (Yoon et al. 2005) Hördt et al. 2020

Genus of bacteria

Novosphingopyxis baekryungensis is a Gram-negative, slightly halophilic and motile bacterium from the genus of Novosphingopyxis which has been isolated from seawater from the Yellow Sea in Korea.
