= Sphingopyxis taejonensis =

Scientific classification
- Domain: Bacteria
- Kingdom: Pseudomonadati
- Phylum: Pseudomonadota
- Class: Alphaproteobacteria
- Order: Sphingomonadales
- Family: Sphingomonadaceae
- Genus: Sphingopyxis
- Species: S. taejonensis

Binomial name
- Sphingopyxis taejonensis (Lee et al. 2001) Pal et al. 2006

Type strain
- DSM 15583, IFO 16724, JCM 11457, KCCM 41068, KCTC 2884, NBRC 16724, strain JSS54

Synonyms
- Sphingomonas taejonensis

Genus of bacteria

Sphingopyxis taejonensis is a bacterium from the genus of Sphingopyxis which has been isolated from natural mineral water from Taejon in Korea.
