= Rhizorhabdus =

Scientific classification
- Domain: Bacteria
- Kingdom: Pseudomonadati
- Phylum: Pseudomonadota
- Class: Alphaproteobacteria
- Order: Sphingomonadales
- Family: Sphingomonadaceae
- Genus: Rhizorhabdus; Francis et al., 2014

Type species
- Rhizorhabdus argentea Francis et al., 2014

Species
- Rhizorhabdus argentea Francis et al. 2014; Rhizorhabdus dicambivorans Yao et al. 2016; Rhizorhabdus histidinilytica (Nigam et al. 2010) Hördt et al. 2020; Rhizorhabdus phycosphaerae Kim et al. 2022; Rhizorhabdus starnbergensis (Chen et al. 2013) Hördt et al. 2020; Rhizorhabdus wittichii (Yabuuchi et al. 2001) Hördt et al. 2020

Genus of bacteria

Rhizorhabdus is a genus of bacteria. Its name is derived from the latin rhiza, meaning root, and rhabdos, meaning rod. Members of this genus, including Rhizorhabdus wittichii and five other species with sequenced genomes, are associated with soil or plant roots.
