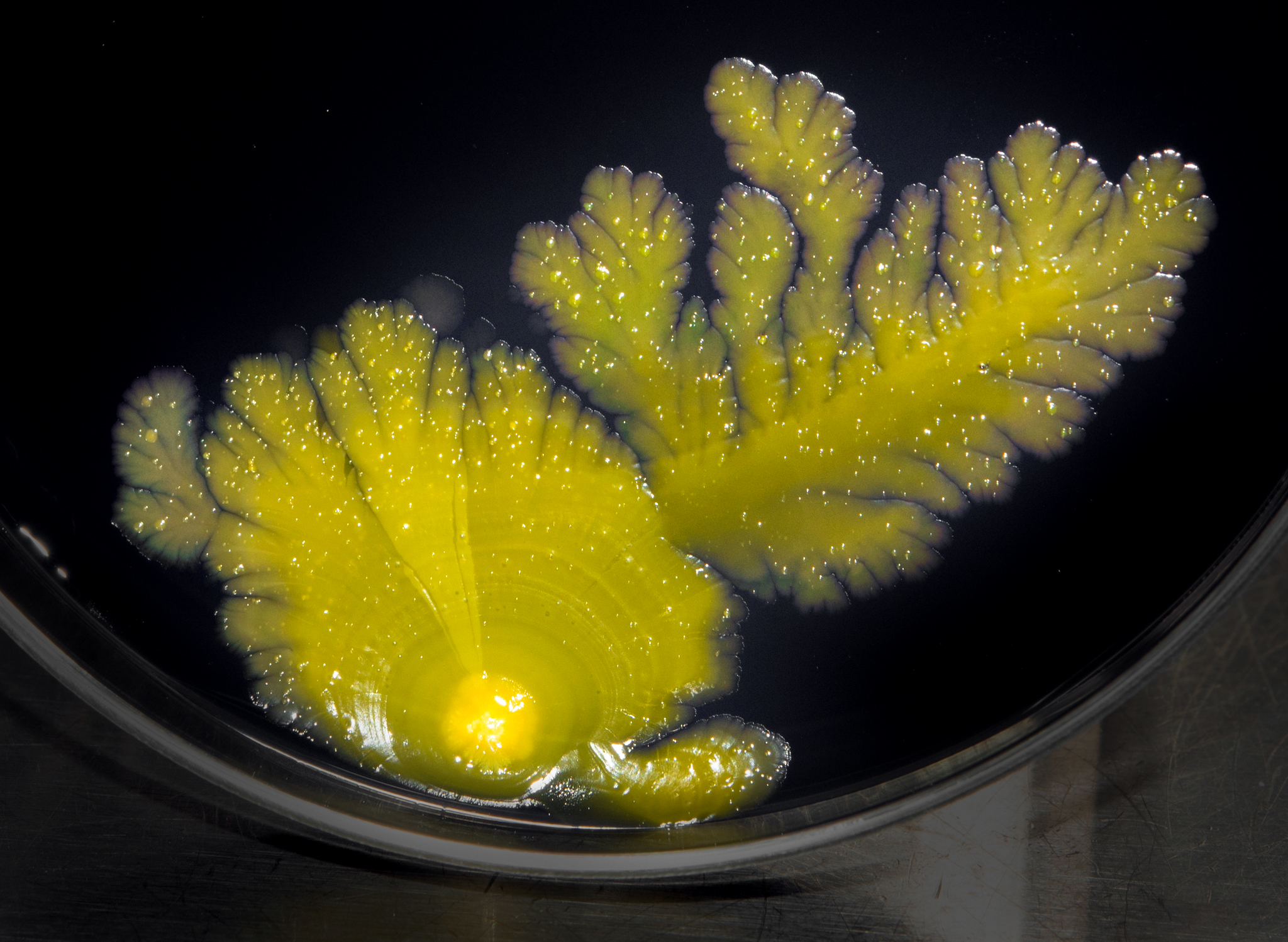

Scientific classification
- Domain: Bacteria
- Kingdom: Pseudomonadati
- Phylum: Pseudomonadota
- Class: Alphaproteobacteria
- Order: Sphingomonadales
- Family: Sphingomonadaceae
- Genus: Sphingomonas
- Species: S. phyllosphaerae

Binomial name
- Sphingomonas phyllosphaerae Rivas et al. 2004

= Sphingomonas phyllosphaerae =

Species of bacterium

Sphingomonas phyllosphaerae is a species of bacterium. It was first isolated from the phyllosphere of a leguminous tree, Acacia caven, in central Argentina. It is Gram-negative, strictly aerobic, rod-shaped and motile. Its type strain is FA2(T) (=LMG 21958(T)=CECT 5832(T)). Sphingomonas phyllosphaerae tested negative for amylase activity, indicating its inability to digest starches. This aligns with many other Sphingomonas species. Other Sphingomonas species display motility by polar flagellation. Citrate testing shows that citrate is not a carbon source for most Sphingomonas species. There are Sphingomonas species that show resistance to many different antibiotics. In the lab, this aligns with Sphingomonas and its ability to resist antibiotics. Sphingomonas species are known to be cold-tolerant, which means the optimal temperature for growth is around 4 degrees Celsius
