= Sphingopyxis alaskensis =

Scientific classification
- Domain: Bacteria
- Kingdom: Pseudomonadati
- Phylum: Pseudomonadota
- Class: Alphaproteobacteria
- Order: Sphingomonadales
- Family: Sphingomonadaceae
- Genus: Sphingopyxis
- Species: S. alaskensis

Binomial name
- Sphingopyxis alaskensis (Vancanneyt et al. 2001) Godoy et al. 2003

Type strain
- CCUG 45028, CIP 106977, DSM 13593, LMG 18877

Synonyms
- Sphingomonas alaska, Sphingomonas alaskensis, Sphingopixis alaskensis

Genus of bacteria

Sphingopyxis alaskensis is a bacterium from the genus of Sphingopyxis which has been isolated from seawater from Alaska.
