= Unsaturated rhamnogalacturonyl hydrolase =

Class of enzymes

Identifiers
- EC no.: 3.2.1.172

Databases
- IntEnz: IntEnz view
- BRENDA: BRENDA entry
- ExPASy: NiceZyme view
- KEGG: KEGG entry
- MetaCyc: metabolic pathway
- PRIAM: profile
- PDB structures: RCSB PDB PDBe PDBsum
Search
- PMC: articles
- PubMed: articles
- NCBI: proteins

Unsaturated rhamnogalacturonyl hydrolase (EC 3.2.1.172, YteR, YesR) is an enzyme with systematic name 2-O-(4-deoxy-beta-L-threo-hex-4-enopyranuronosyl)-alpha-L-rhamnopyranose hydrolase. This enzyme catalyses the following chemical reaction

2-O-(4-deoxy-beta-L-threo-hex-4-enopyranuronosyl)-alpha-L-rhamnopyranose + H_{2}O $\rightleftharpoons$ 5-dehydro-4-deoxy-D-glucuronate + L-rhamnopyranose

The enzyme is part of the degradation system for rhamnogalacturonan I in Bacillus subtilis strain 168.
