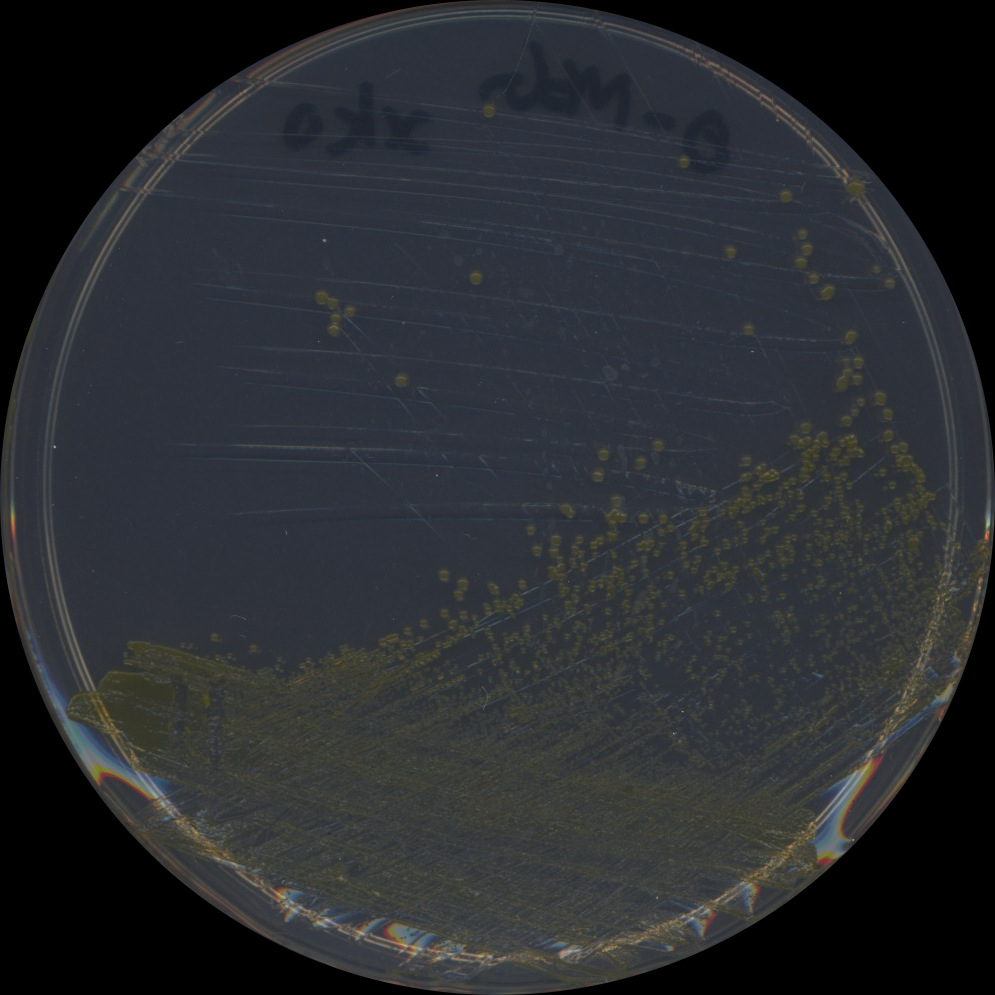
- Colonies of the gram negative bacterium Sphingobium chlorophenolicum

Scientific classification
- Domain: Bacteria
- Kingdom: Pseudomonadati
- Phylum: Pseudomonadota
- Class: Alphaproteobacteria
- Order: Sphingomonadales
- Family: Sphingomonadaceae
- Genus: Sphingobium; Takeuchi et al. 2001

Species
- Sphingobium abikonense Sphingobium amiense Sphingobium aromaticiconvertens Sphingobium baderi Sphingobium barthaii Sphingobium boecki Sphingobium chinhatense Sphingobium chlorophenolicum Sphingobium chungbukense Sphingobium cloacae Sphingobium cupriresistens Sphingobium czechense Sphingobium endophyticum Sphingobium faniae Sphingobium fontiphilum Sphingobium francense Sphingobium fuliginis Sphingobium herbicidovorans Sphingobium indicum Sphingobium japonicum Sphingobium jiangsuense Sphingobium lactosutens Sphingobium limneticum Sphingobium lucknowense Sphingobium mellinum Sphingobium olei Sphingobium phenoxybenzoativorans Sphingobium qiguonii Sphingobium quisquiliarum Sphingobium rhizovicinum Sphingobium scionense Sphingobium subterraneum Sphingobium sufflavum Sphingobium ummariense Sphingobium vermicomposti Sphingobium vulgare Sphingobium wenxiniae Sphingobium xanthum Sphingobium xenophagum Sphingobium yanoikuyae

= Sphingobium =

Genus of bacteria

Sphingobium species are different from other sphingomonads in that they are commonly isolated from soil; They can degrade a variety of chemicals in the environment such as aromatic and chloroaromatic compounds, phenols like nonylphenol and pentachlorophenol, herbicides such as (RS)-2-(4-chloro-2-methylphenoxy) propionic acid and hexachlorocyclohexane, and polycyclic aromatic hydrocarbons.
