= Blastomonas natatoria =

Blastomonas aquatica

Scientific classification
- Domain: Bacteria
- Kingdom: Pseudomonadati
- Phylum: Pseudomonadota
- Class: Alphaproteobacteria
- Order: Sphingomonadales
- Family: Sphingomonadaceae
- Genus: Blastomonas
- Species: B. natatoria

Binomial name
- Blastomonas natatoria (Sly 1985) Sly and Cahill 1997

Type strain
- ACM 2507 ATCC 35951; CIP 106842; DSM 3183; HAMBI 2081; IFO 15649; JCM 10396; JCM 12333; LMG 17322; NBRC 15649; NCIMB 12085 strain EY 4220; UQM 2507

Synonyms
- Sphingomonas natatoria (Sly 1985) Yabuuchi et al. 1999; Blastobacter natatorius Sly 1985

Species of bacterium

Blastomonas natatoria is a Gram-negative bacterium from the genus Blastomonas.
