= Lutibacterium =

Scientific classification
- Domain: Bacteria
- Kingdom: Pseudomonadati
- Phylum: Pseudomonadota
- Class: Alphaproteobacteria
- Order: Sphingomonadales
- Family: Sphingomonadaceae
- Genus: Lutibacterium

Genus of bacteria

Lutibacterium is a genus of Gram-negative staining bacteria. It includes the hydrocarbon-degrading strain Lutibacterium anuloederans LC8.
