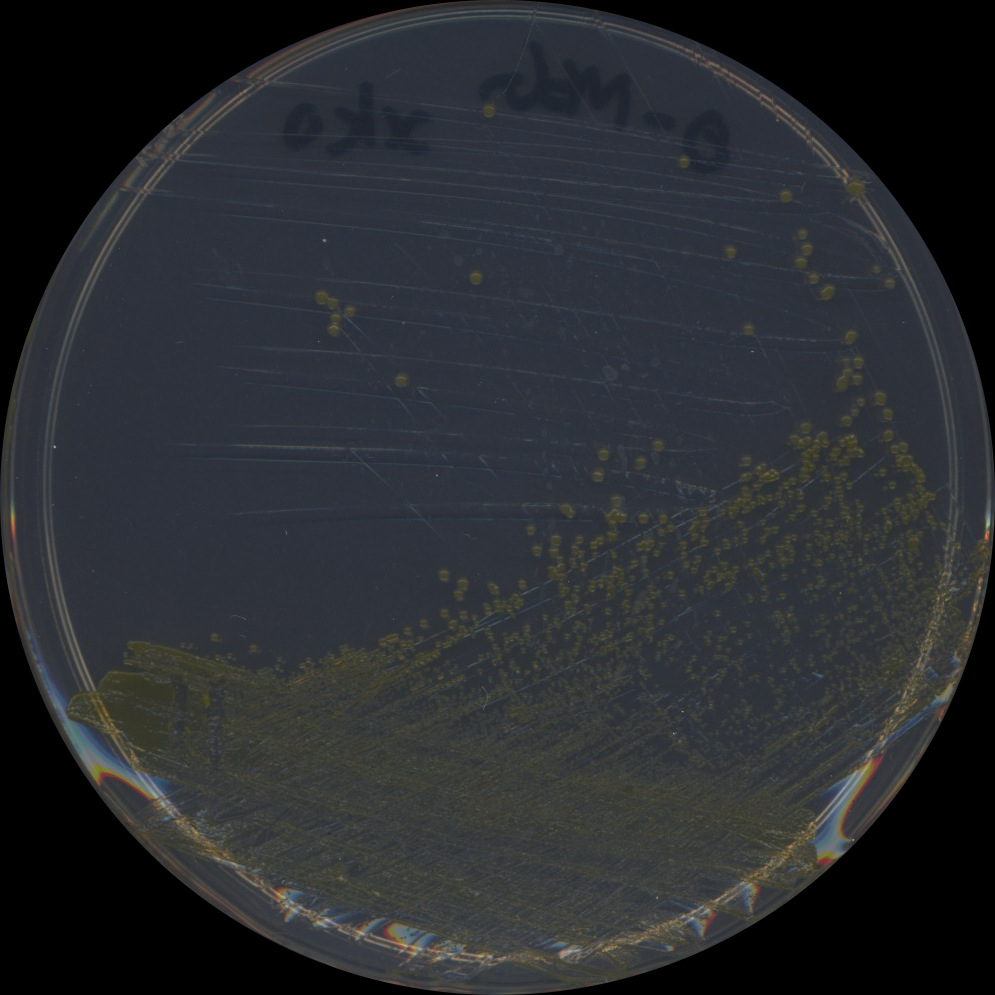

Scientific classification
- Domain: Bacteria
- Kingdom: Pseudomonadati
- Phylum: Pseudomonadota
- Class: Alphaproteobacteria
- Order: Sphingomonadales
- Family: Sphingomonadaceae
- Genus: Sphingobium
- Species: S. chlorophenolicum

Binomial name
- Sphingobium chlorophenolicum (Nohynek et al. 1995) Takeuchi et al. 2001

Type strain
- ATCC 33790

Synonyms
- Sphingomonas chlorophenolica Nohynek et al. 1995; Arthrobacter sp. ATCC 33790

= Sphingobium chlorophenolicum =

Species of bacterium

Sphingobium chlorophenolicum is a species of gram-negative bacteria. The type strain was first identified from North American soils contaminated with chlorophenols and was formally described in 1995. It is of interest to researchers because it can mineralise the toxic pesticide pentachlorophenol (PCP).
