= Citromicrobium =

Scientific classification
- Domain: Bacteria
- Kingdom: Pseudomonadati
- Phylum: Pseudomonadota
- Class: Alphaproteobacteria
- Order: Sphingomonadales
- Family: Sphingomonadaceae
- Genus: Citromicrobium; Yurkov et al. 1999

Species
- C. bathyomarinum

Genus of bacteria

Citromicrobium is an aerobic bacteria genus from the family of Sphingomonadaceae with one known species (Citromicrobium bathyomarinum).
