= Galactose binding lectin domain =

Gal_Lectin

Identifiers
- Symbol: Gal_Lectin
- Pfam: PF02140
- InterPro: IPR000922
Available protein structures:
- PDB: IPR000922 PF02140 (ECOD; PDBsum)
- AlphaFold: IPR000922; PF02140

In molecular biology, the galactose binding lectin domain is a protein domain. It is found in many proteins including the lectin purified from sea urchin (Anthocidaris crassispina) eggs, SUEL. This lectin exists as a disulfide-linked homodimer of two subunits; the dimeric form is essential for hemagglutination activity. The sea urchin egg lectin (SUEL) forms a new class of lectins. Although SUEL was first isolated as a D-galactoside binding lectin, it was later shown that it binds to L-rhamnose preferentially. L-rhamnose and D-galactose share the same hydroxyl group orientation at C2 and C4 of the pyranose ring structure.

A cysteine-rich domain (the galactose binding lectin domain) homologous to the SUEL protein has been identified in the following proteins:

- Plant beta-galactosidases EC 3.2.1.23 (lactases).
- Mammalian latrophilin, the calcium independent receptor of alpha-latrotoxin (CIRL). The galactose-binding lectin domain is not required for alpha-latratoxin binding.
  - Human latrophilin-1.
  - Human Latrophilin-2.
- Rhamnose-binding lectin (SAL) from catfish (Silurus asotus) eggs. This protein is composed of three tandem repeat domains homologous to the SUEL lectin domain. All cysteine positions of each domain are completely conserved.
- The hypothetical B0457.1, F32A7.3A and F32A7.3B proteins from Caenorhabditis elegans.
