= Sphingosinicellaceae =

Scientific classification
- Domain: Bacteria
- Kingdom: Pseudomonadati
- Phylum: Pseudomonadota
- Class: Alphaproteobacteria
- Order: Sphingomonadales
- Family: Sphingosinicellaceae; Hördt et al. 2020

Genera
- Pacificimonas corrig. Liu et al. 2016; Polymorphobacter Fukuda et al. 2014; Pedomonas Lopez Marin et al. 2022; "Sandaracinobacter" Yurkov et al. 1997; Sandarakinorhabdus Gich and Overmann 2006; Sphingoaurantiacus Kim et al. 2016; Sphingosinicella Maruyama et al. 2006; Thermaurantiacus Ming et al. 2021

Family of bacteria

The Sphingosinicellaceae are a family of the Sphingomonadales.
