= Sphingopyxis =

Scientific classification
- Domain: Bacteria
- Kingdom: Pseudomonadati
- Phylum: Pseudomonadota
- Class: Alphaproteobacteria
- Order: Sphingomonadales
- Family: Sphingomonadaceae
- Genus: Sphingopyxis; Takeuchi et al. 2001

Species
- Sphingopyxis alaskensis Sphingopyxis baekryungensis Sphingopyxis bauzanensis Sphingopyxis chilensis Sphingopyxis contaminans Sphingopyxis flava Sphingopyxis flavimaris Sphingopyxis fribergensis Sphingopyxis ginsengisoli Sphingopyxis granuli Sphingopyxis indica Sphingopyxis italica Sphingopyxis nepalensis Sphingopyxis panaciterrae Sphingopyxis panaciterrulae Sphingopyxis rigui Sphingopyxis soli Sphingopyxis solisilvae Sphingopyxis taejonensis Sphingopyxis ummariensis Sphingopyxis witflariensis Sphingopyxis wooponensis

Genus of bacteria

Sphingopyxis is a bacterial genus.
