= Rhamnose =

Names
- IUPAC name 6-Deoxy-L-mannopyranose
- Systematic IUPAC name (2R,3R,4R,5R,6S)-6-Methyloxane-2,3,4,5-tetrol
- Other names Isodulcit α-L-Rhamnose; L-Rhamnose; L-Mannomethylose α-L-Rha α-L-Rhamnoside α-L-Mannomethylose; 6-Deoxy-L-mannose; L-Rhamnopyranose

Identifiers
CAS Number	3615-41-6
3D model (JSmol)	Interactive image
ChEBI	CHEBI:16055
ChemSpider	18150
DrugBank	DB01869
ECHA InfoCard	100.020.722
KEGG	C00507
PubChem CID	19233
UNII	QN34XC755A
CompTox Dashboard (EPA)	DTXSID7042647
- InChI: InChI=1S/C6H12O5/c1-3(8)5(10)6(11)4(9)2-7/h2-6,8-11H,1H3/t3-,4-,5-,6-/m0/s1 Key: PNNNRSAQSRJVSB-BXKVDMCESA-N; InChI=1/C6H12O5/c1-3(8)5(10)6(11)4(9)2-7/h2-6,8-11H,1H3/t3-,4-,5-,6-/m0/s1 Key: PNNNRSAQSRJVSB-BXKVDMCEBH
- SMILES: O=C[C@H](O)[C@H](O)[C@@H](O)[C@@H](O)C

Properties
Chemical formula	C_{6}H_{12}O_{5}
Molar mass	164.157 g·mol^{−1}
Density	1.41 g/mL
Melting point	91 to 93 °C (196 to 199 °F; 364 to 366 K) (monohydrate)
Magnetic susceptibility (χ)	−99.20·10^{−6} cm^{3}/mol
- Except where otherwise noted, data are given for materials in their standard state (at 25 °C [77 °F], 100 kPa). verify (what is ?) Infobox references

Rhamnose (Rha, Rham) is a naturally occurring deoxy sugar. It can be classified as either a methyl-pentose or a 6-deoxy-hexose. Rhamnose predominantly occurs in nature in its L-form as L-rhamnose (6-deoxy-L-mannose). This is unusual, since most of the naturally occurring sugars are in D-form. Exceptions are the methyl pentoses L-fucose and L-rhamnose and the pentose L-arabinose. However, examples of naturally occurring D-rhamnose are found in some species of bacteria, such as Pseudomonas aeruginosa and Helicobacter pylori.

Rhamnose can be isolated from buckthorn (Rhamnus), poison sumac, and plants in the genus Uncaria. Rhamnose is also produced by microalgae belonging to class Bacillariophyceae (diatoms).

Rhamnose is commonly bound to other sugars in nature. It is a common glycone component of glycosides from many plants. Rhamnose is also a component of the outer cell membrane of acid-fast bacteria in the Mycobacterium genus, which includes the organism that causes tuberculosis. Natural antibodies against L-rhamnose are present in human serum, and the majority of people seem to possess IgM, IgG or both of these types of immunoglobulins capable of binding this glycan.

An interesting particularity of rhamnose is the presence of formaldehyde production when reacted with periodates in the vicinal diol cleavage reaction, that makes it very useful to remove excess periodate in glycerol or other vicinal diol analysis, that would otherwise give colored blank issues.

== See also ==
- Galactose binding lectin domain, despite the name, often binds rhamnose
- Alpha-L-rhamnosidase

Disaccharides:

- Rutinose, rhamnose-glucose
- Neohesperidose, rhamnose-glucose
- Robinose, rhamnose-galactose

Polysaccharides:

- Gellan gum -glucose-glucuronic acid-glucose-rhamnose-
- Welan gum
- Rhamnogalacturonan, a type of pectin

Glycosides:

- Category:Rhamnosides
- Echinacoside
- Rhamnolipid
- Verbascoside
