= Welan gum =

Identifiers
CAS Number	96949-22-3
ECHA InfoCard	100.118.859
EC Number	619-250-2

Properties
Appearance	white to cream colored powder
Density	26.25 lbs/ft³ (bulk)

Hazards
NFPA 704 (fire diamond)	1 1 0
- Safety data sheet (SDS)
- Except where otherwise noted, data are given for materials in their standard state (at 25 °C [77 °F], 100 kPa). verify (what is ?) Infobox references

Welan gum is an exopolysaccharide used as a rheology modifier in industrial applications such as cement manufacturing. It is produced by fermentation of sugar by bacteria of the genus Alcaligenes. The molecule consists of repeating tetrasaccharide units with single branches of L-mannose or L-rhamnose. In solution, the gum retains viscosity at elevated temperature, and is stable in a wide pH range, in the presence of calcium ion, and with high concentration of glycols.

== See also ==
- Gellan gum
- Xanthan gum
