= Gellan gum =

Gelling and thickening agent

Names
- Other names Gum gellan; E418; [D-Glc(β1→4)D-GlcA(β1→4)D-Glc(β1→4)L-Rha(α1→3)]_{n}

Identifiers
CAS Number	71010-52-1
ECHA InfoCard	100.068.267
EC Number	275-117-5
E number	E418 (thickeners, ...)
UNII	7593U09I4D
CompTox Dashboard (EPA)	DTXSID3044174
- Except where otherwise noted, data are given for materials in their standard state (at 25 °C [77 °F], 100 kPa). Infobox references

Gellan gum is a water-soluble anionic polysaccharide produced by the bacterium Sphingomonas elodea (formerly Pseudomonas elodea based on the taxonomic classification at the time of its discovery). The gellan-producing bacterium was discovered and isolated by the former Kelco Division of Merck & Company, Inc. in 1978 from the lily plant tissue from a pond in Pennsylvania. It was initially identified as a gelling agent to replace agar at significantly lower concentrations in solid culture media for the growth of various microorganisms. Its initial commercial product with the trademark as Gelrite gellan gum, was subsequently identified as a suitable agar substitute as gelling agent in various clinical bacteriological media.

== Chemical structure ==
The repeating unit of the polymer is a tetrasaccharide, which consists of two residues of D-glucose and one of each residues of L-rhamnose and D-glucuronic acid. The tetrasaccharide repeat has the following structure:
[D-Glc(β1→4)D-GlcA(β1→4)D-Glc(β1→4)L-Rha(α1→3)]_{n}

Gellan gum products are generally put into two categories, low acyl and high acyl depending on the number of acetate groups attached to the polymer. The low acyl gellan gum products form firm, non-elastic, brittle gels, whereas the high acyl gellan gum forms soft and elastic gels.

== Microbiological gelling agent ==
Gellan gum is initially used as a gelling agent, alternative to agar, in microbiological culture. It is able to withstand 120 °C heat. It was identified as an especially useful gelling agent in culturing thermophilic microorganisms. One needs only approximately half the concentration of gellan gum as agar to reach an equivalent gel strength, though the exact texture and quality depends on the concentration of the divalent cations present. Gellan gum is also used as gelling agent in plant cell culture on Petri dishes, as it provides a very clear gel, facilitating light microscopical analyses of the cells and tissues. Although advertised as being inert, experiments with the moss Physcomitrella patens have shown that choice of the gelling agent—agar or Gelrite—does influence phytohormone sensitivity of the plant cell culture.

== Food science ==
As a food additive, gellan gum was first approved for food use in Japan (1988). Gellan gum has subsequently been approved for food, non-food, cosmetic and pharmaceutical uses by many other jurisdictions such as the US, Canada, China, Korea and the European Union. It is widely used as a thickener, emulsifier, and stabilizer. It has E number E418. It was an integral part of the now defunct Orbitz soft drink. It is used as the gelling agent, as an alternative to gelatin, in the manufacture of vegan varieties of "gum" candies.

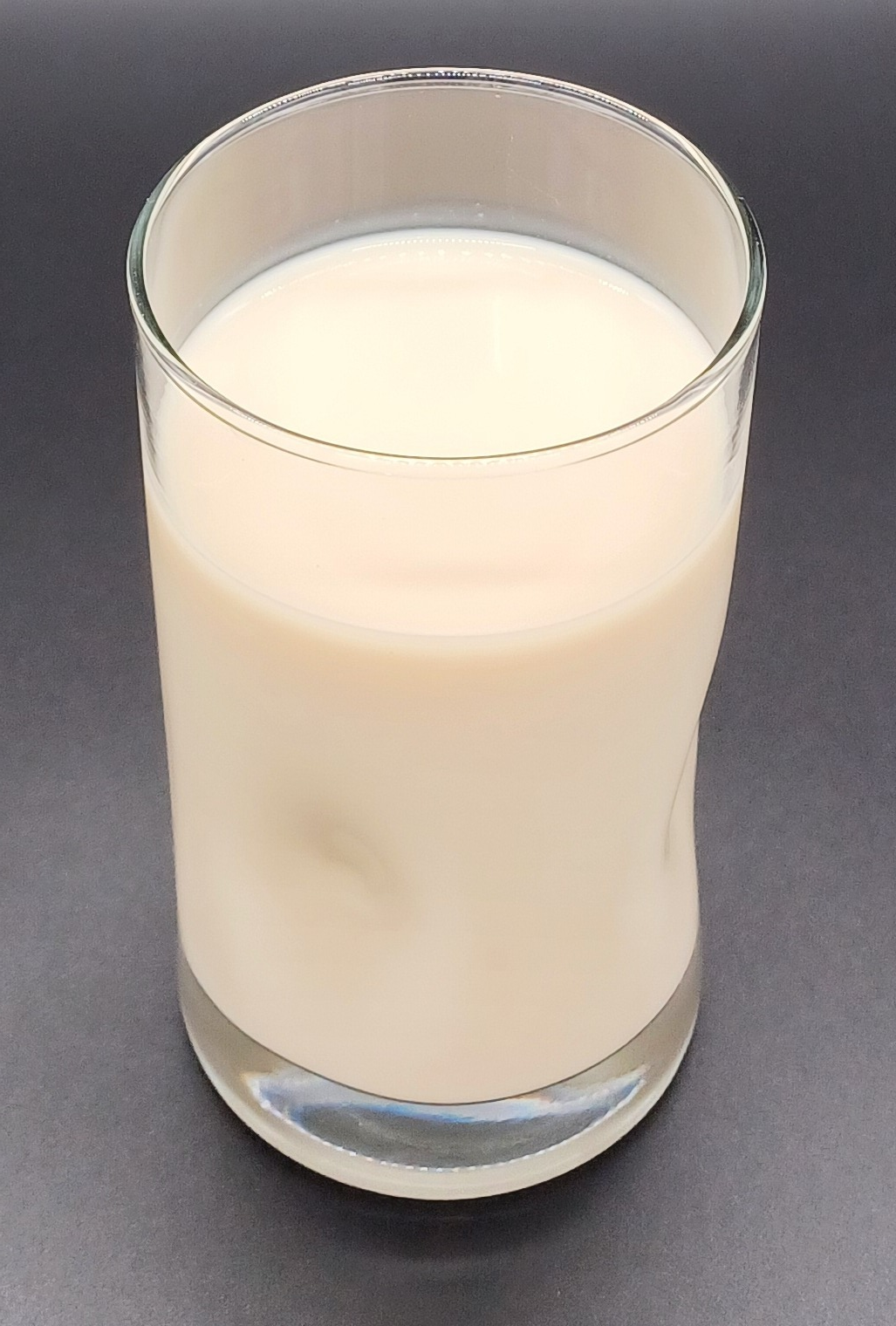
Flax milk containing gellan gum

It is used in plant-based milks to keep plant protein suspended in the milk. Gellan has also become popular in haute cuisine, and in particular in molecular gastronomy and other scientifically-informed schools of cooking, to make flavorful gels; British chef Heston Blumenthal and American chef Wylie Dufresne are generally considered to be the earliest chefs to incorporate gellan into high-end restaurant cooking, but other chefs have since adopted the innovation.

Gellan gum, when properly hydrated, can be used in ice cream and sorbet recipes that behave as a fluid gel after churning. Using gellan gum, the ice cream or sorbet can be set in a dish of flaming alcohol without melting.

== Production ==
Gellan was discovered and developed as a commercial biogum hydrocolloid product by Kelco, then a division of Merck & Co. In the United States, Kelco was responsible for obtaining food approval for gellan gum worldwide. In other markets that are fond of innovative food ingredients, such as Japan, food approval has been obtained by local food and beverage manufacturers. Kelco, now the CP Kelco family of companies owned by J.M. Huber Corporation historically, produced the majority of food grade gellan gum. However, since the entry into the segment of Royal DSM, the Dutch science and food nutrition conglomerate, users of food grade gellan gum now procure from two suppliers. Chinese suppliers have also been increasingly aggressive in gellan gum production. However, the lack of consistent quality production, adherence to stringent food grade requirements and lack of a strong technical and application support means that such gellan gum is primarily destined for use in personal care or household care applications.

Pure gellan gum is one of the most expensive hydrocolloids. Its cost in use, however, is competitive with other much lower-priced hydrocolloids.

== See also ==
- Welan gum
- Sphingomonas elodea

Lin, Chi Chung; Casida Jr, L. E. (1984). "GELRITE as a gelling agent in media for the growth of thermophilic microorganisms". Applied and Environmental Microbiology. 47 (2): 427–429. Bibcode:1984ApEnM..47..427L. doi:10.1128/aem.47.2.427-429.1984. PMC 239688. PMID 16346480.
