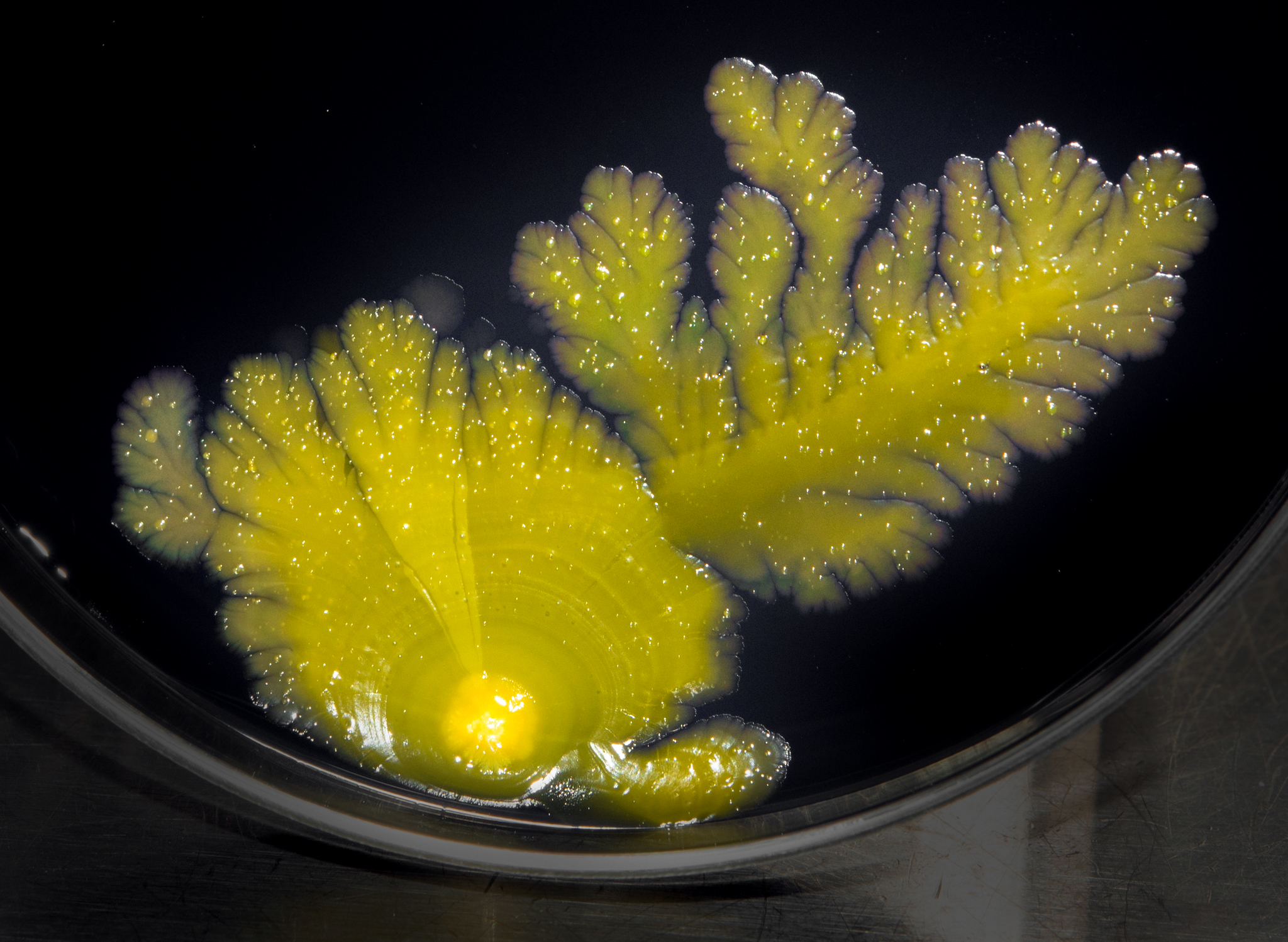
- A culture of Sphingomonas phyllosphaerae

Scientific classification
- Domain: Bacteria
- Kingdom: Pseudomonadati
- Phylum: Pseudomonadota
- Class: Alphaproteobacteria
- Order: Sphingomonadales
- Family: Sphingomonadaceae; Kosako et al. 2000

Type genus
- Sphingomonas Yabuuchi et al. 1990

Genera
- Aestuariisphingobium Li et al. 2020; Allosphingosinicella Hördt et al. 2020; Aquisediminimonas Jin et al. 2019; "Binariimonas" Zhao et al. 2016; Blastomonas Sly and Cahill 1997; Chakrabartia Jani et al. 2019; "Citromicrobium" Yurkov et al. 1999; Facivitalis Arkan-Ozdemir et al. 2025; "Hankyongella" Siddiqi and Im 2020; Hephaestia Felföldi et al. 2014; "Lutibacterium" Chung and King 2001; Novosphingopyxis Feng et al. 2020; Parablastomonas Ren et al. 2015; Parasphingopyxis Uchida et al. 2012; Parasphingorhabdus Feng et al. 2020; Rhizorhabdus Francis et al. 2014; Rhizorhapis Francis et al. 2014; Sphingobium Takeuchi et al. 2001; Sphingomicrobium Kämpfer et al. 2012; Sphingomonas Yabuuchi et al. 1990; Sphingopyxis Takeuchi et al. 2001; Sphingorhabdus Jogler et al. 2013; Sphingosinithalassobacter Hetharua et al. 2019; Stakelama Chen et al. 2010; "Tardibacter" Lee et al. 2018

= Sphingomonadaceae =

Family of bacteria

Sphingomonadaceae are a gram-negative bacterial family of the Alphaproteobacteria. An important feature is the presence of sphingolipids (mainly 2′-hydroxymyristoyl dihydrosphingosine 1-glucuronic acid, "SGL-1") in the outer membrane of the cell wall. The cells are ovoid or rod-shaped. Others are also pleomorphic, i.e. the cells change the shape over time. Some species from Sphingomonadaceae family are dominant components of biofilms.

== Energy source ==
While most species within Sphingomonadaceae family are heterotrophic, some are phototrophic.

== Function ==
Some species of Sphingomonadaceae are known to degrade some aromatic compounds. This makes the bacteria of interest to environmental remediation.

The diverse metabolic capacity of genera within the Sphingomonadaceae family, such as Sphingobium, Novosphingobium, (Note: Not a member of Sphingomonadaceae, per LPSN) and Sphingopyxis enable these genera to adapt to and be abundant in the presence of bisphenol A. A microbial community with abundant Sphingomonadaceae members can degrade bisphenol A with a constant rate.

Some Sphingomonas species are able to produce sphingans, a kind of exopolysaccharides with certain viscosity. This property of sphingans makes it useful in many industries including food and pharmaceutical.

== Distribution ==
Bacteria within Sphingomonadaceae family are distributed in various environments, such as water, soil, sediment.

== Phylogeny ==
The currently accepted taxonomy is based on the List of Prokaryotic names with Standing in Nomenclature and the phylogeny is based on whole-genome sequences. (Note: Aestuariisphingobium, Aquisediminimonas, Chakrabartia, Parablastomonas, and Sphingosinithalassobacter are not included in this phylogenetic tree.)

- - Sphingomonadaceae
    - - Sphingomicrobium
      - - - Sphingopyxis
          - Sphingorhabdus
        - - Parasphingopyxis
          - - Novosphingopyxis
            - - Blastomonas
              - Parasphingorhabdus
    - - - Rhizorhapis
        - Sphingobium
      - - - Stakelama
          - - Hephaestia
            - Sphingomonas
        - - Allosphingosinicella
          - Rhizorhabdus
  - outgroup
    Erythrobacteraceae

== Interaction with human and plants ==
Some members of the Sphingomonadaceae commonly exist in human-impacted environments, including drinking water systems, hospital and household tap water, and medical devices.

Most of the species of the Sphingomonadaceae are not known to be harmful to humans or plants. Some species can protect plants from disease-causing pathogens such as Thielaviopsis basicola, and Rhizoctonia solani.

The Sphingomonas and Sphingobium genera tend to have higher antibiotic resistance compared with three other genera within the Sphingomonadaceae: Novosphingobium, Sphingopyxis, and Blastomonas.

== See also ==
- Dihydrosphingosine
- Glucuronic acid
- 2-Hydroxy acid, for 2′-hydroxymyristoyl
- Myristic acid, for 2′-hydroxymyristoyl
