= Sphingomonadales =

Scientific classification
- Domain: Bacteria
- Kingdom: Pseudomonadati
- Phylum: Pseudomonadota
- Class: Alphaproteobacteria
- Order: Sphingomonadales; Yabuuchi and Kosako 2006

Families
- Erythrobacteraceae Lee et al. 2005; Sphingomonadaceae Kosako et al. 2000; Sphingosinicellaceae Hördt et al. 2020; Zymomonadaceae Hördt et al. 2020

Order of bacteria

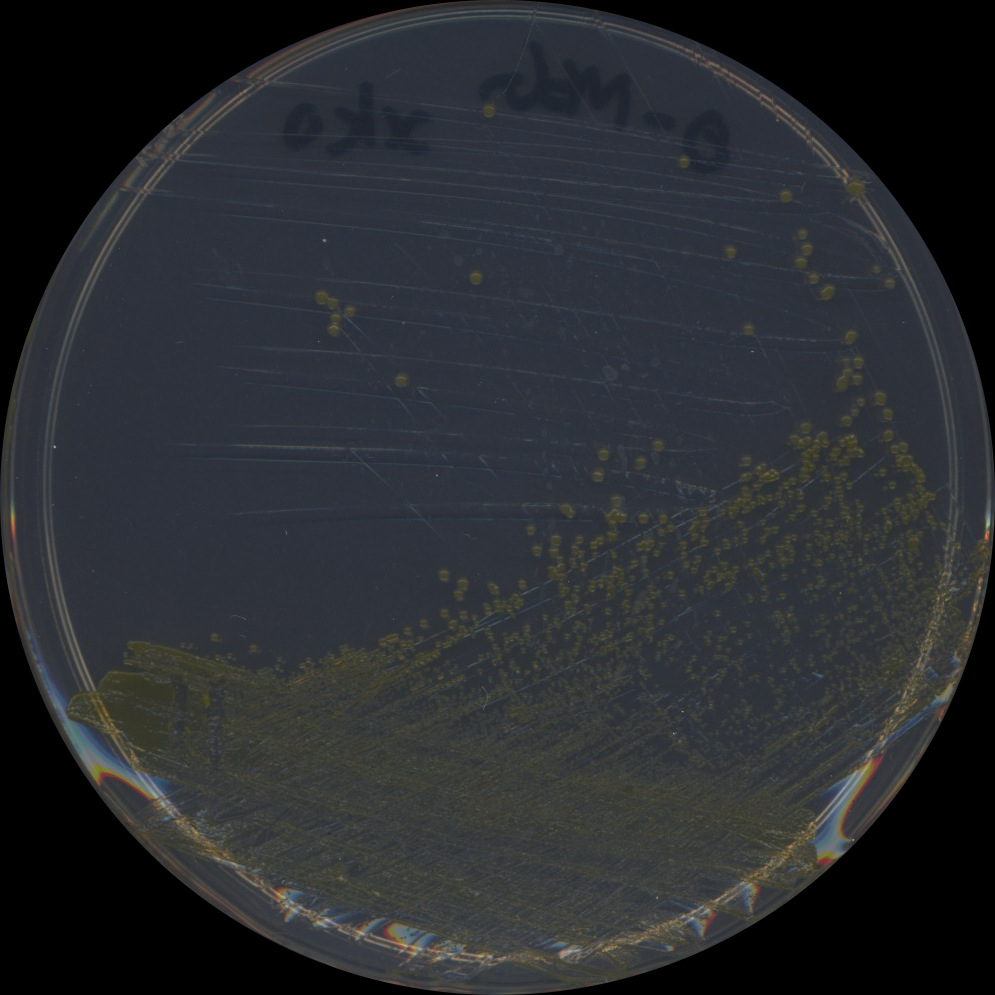
Colonies of the gram negative bacterium Sphingobium chlorophenolicum

The Sphingomonadales are an order of the Alphaproteobacteria.

== Phylogeny ==
The currently accepted taxonomy is based on the List of Prokaryotic names with Standing in Nomenclature and the phylogeny is based on whole-genome sequences.

- - Sphingomonadales
    - Sphingosinicellaceae
    - - Zymomonadaceae
      - - Sphingomonadaceae
        - Erythrobacteraceae
  - outgroup
    Rhodospirillales
