= Novosphingobium pentaromativorans =

Scientific classification
- Domain: Bacteria
- Kingdom: Pseudomonadati
- Phylum: Pseudomonadota
- Class: Alphaproteobacteria
- Order: Sphingomonadales
- Family: Erythrobacteraceae
- Genus: Novosphingobium
- Species: N. pentaromativorans

Binomial name
- Novosphingobium pentaromativorans Sohn et al. 2004

Species of bacterium

Novosphingobium pentaromativorans is a species of high-molecular-mass polycyclic aromatic hydrocarbon-degrading bacterium. It is Gram-negative, yellow-pigmented and halophilic. The genome of the type strain US6-1T (=KCTC 10454T =JCM 12182T) has been sequenced, revealing the presence of two plasmids. The larger of these plasmids contains the majority of the aromatic-hydrocarbon degrading genes and has been implicated in studies to play an important role in degrading bicyclic aromatic compounds.This ability to degrade polycyclic aromatic hydrocarbons (PAHs) and alkylated PAHs suggests N. pentaromativorans may be used for bioremediation.

== Characteristics ==
Novosphingobium pentaromativorans is a gram-negative rod-shaped bacteria that forms colonies with a yellow pigment. It is a moderately halophilic, non-motile, nitrate reductase-positive, facultative anaerobe. N. pentaromativorans was first isolated from estuarine sediments in Ulsan Bay, Republic of Korea in 2004. It was originally cultured on marine agar and tryptic soy agar and has optimal growth at 30°C. Additionally, ideal growth is observed with media containing a NaCl concentration of 2.5% and a pH of 6.5. Importantly, N. pentaromativorans possesses the ability to degrade high molecular weight (HMW) PAHs as well as alkylated PAHs such as 1-methylphenanthrene.

N. pentaromativorans US6-1 was sequenced in 2012, resulting in a genome of 5,096,413 bp with 63.1% GC content and the identification of two plasmids, designated pLA1 and pLA2. The larger plasmid, pLA1 was 188,476 bp in length with 62.6% GC content. The secondary plasmid, pLA2, is composed of 60,085 bp and has 60.2% GC content. The genome of N. pentaromativorans US6-1 showed homology to the genome of N. aromaticivorans DSM 12444, another species belonging to the Novosphigobium genus, which can degrade mono- and bi-aromatic hydrocarbons. Additionally, the conjugative region of pLA1 showed homology to N. aromaticivorans plasmid pNL1 and to the plasmid pCAR3 of Sphingomonas sp. strain KA1.

== Polycyclic aromatic hydrocarbon degradation ==
One of the most studied qualities of N. pentaromativorans is its ability to degrade high molecular weight (HMW) polycyclic aromatic hydrocarbons (PAHs). HMW PAHs are a toxic environmental pollutant that are often resistant to microbial degradation. Because of this, organisms that are capable of degrading these HMW PAHs are of high interest as potential candidates for bioremediation of PAH-contaminated environments. Further, N. pentaromativorans has been used to study the proteins used in the degradation of PAHs, resulting in the identification of multiple enzymes involved in the process including 4-hydroxybenzoate 3-monooxygenase, salicylaldehyde dehydrogenase, and the PAH ring-hydroxylating dioxygenase alpha subunit.

N. pentaromativorans is capable of degrading HMW PAHs with two to five aromatic rings. It does this using the enzyme ring-hydroxylating dioxygenase and through further processing in either the o-phthalate pathway or salicylate pathway. Following these pathways, products are used in the tricarboxylic acid cycle and mineralized to CO_{2}. Several of the genes used in HMW PAH degradation are found on the chromosomal genome of N. pentaromativorans, but the PAH catabolic region primarily responsible for PAH degradation are located on pLA1.
