= Ruthenbach =

Ruthenbach may refer to:

- Ruthenbach (Ems), a river of North Rhine-Westphalia, Germany, tributary of the Ems
- Ruthebach, officially also referred to as Ruthenbach, a river of North Rhine-Westphalia, Germany, tributary of the Loddenbach
