= Laibach (disambiguation) =

Laibach is a Slovenian industrial musical group.

Laibach may refer to:

- Ljubljana, the capital of Slovenia, by its historical German name
- Laibach (album), eponymous album of the Slovenian industrial musical group
- Laibach (Ruthebach), a river of North Rhine-Westphalia, Germany, headstream of the Ruthebach
- Laibach, a historical neighborhood of Sheboygan, Wisconsin
- Laibach, a label of wine produced by the Laibach Vineyards in Stellenbosch, South Africa
- Friedrich Laibach (1885–1967), German botanist
