= BZIP intron plant =

Consensus secondary structure and sequence conservation of bZIP intron in plants

The bZIP intron plant is an unconventional bZIP intron in plants located in the mRNA of bZIP60 orthologs. The consensus RNA structure is very similar to the animal variant with short, usually 23 nt intron defined by the loop regions of the conserved hairpins. Majority of the plants contain also a nested spliceosomal intron located at the base of 3’ hairpin. The unconventional splicing in this group is performed by IRE1 in response to ER stress and it was first described in Arabidopsis thaliana.
