= Wiesengraben =

River in Germany

Location
- Country: Germany
- State: North Rhine-Westphalia

Physical characteristics
- Source
  - coordinates: 52.0629°N 8.3406°E
- Mouth
  - location: into the Ruthebach
  - coordinates: 52.0591°N 8.3310°E

Basin features
- Progression: Ruthebach→ Loddenbach→ Ems→ North Sea

Wiesengraben is a river of North Rhine-Westphalia, Germany, near Halle (Westfalen). It is the right headstream of the Ruthebach.

== See also ==
- List of rivers of North Rhine-Westphalia
