= BZIP intron candida =

Consensus secondary structure and sequence conservation of bZIP intron in some Candida sp.

The bZIP intron candida is an unconventional bZIP intron located in the HAC1 mRNA in a subgroup of fungi from Saccharomycetales order. So far all species with this type of structure belong to Metschnikowiaceae or Debaryomycetaceae families. However, some of the best known representatives of Debaryomycetaceae - Candida albicans and its closest relatives - contain the shorter RNA structure instead (bZIP intron ascomycota-like). The consensus structure consists of two well conserved hairpins with loop regions defining the unconventional splice sites. The hairpins are separated by a long insertion with conserved motifs and a predicted secondary structure. Splicing performed by Ire1 results in excision of a very long intron that was first described in Candida parapsilosis.

== Diversity and structure ==
The 'Candida-type' bZIP intron is defined by a symmetric hairpin architecture (H2 and H3) flanking an internal sequence, distinct from the asymmetric 'Ascomycota-type' found in Candida albicans. These introns can reach extreme lengths, such as 626 nt in Candida parapsilosis and 848 nt in Lodderomyces elongisporus, while maintaining the conserved core hairpins.
