= BZIP intron basidiomycota =

Consensus secondary structure and sequence conservation of bZIP intron in Basidiomycota

The bZIP intron basidiomycota is an unconventional bZIP intron found mainly in the Basidiomycota and some Mucoromycotina fungi. The consensus RNA structure is formed by three hairpins - two well conserved at the 5' and 3' ends and a variable one in between them. The loop regions of 5' and 3' hairpins define the splice sites recognised by Ire1, which performs the unconventional splicing in response to ER stress. In Basidiomycota, splicing results in excised introns from 20 to 101 nt in length and it was first described in Cryptococcus neoformans.
