= Hothead =

Hothead may refer to:

- "Hothead" (Courage the Cowardly Dog), a 1999 television episode
- Hothead (film), a 1979 French film
- HOTHEAD (gene), a gene in Arabidopsis thaliana that encodes a flavin adenine dinucleotide-containing oxidoreductase
- "Hothead" (Smallville episode), a 2001 television episode
- Hothead Games, an independent video game developer
- Hothead Paisan, a fictional character
- "Hothead", a song by Captain Beefheart from the album Doc at the Radar Station
- Hot Head, a character in Skylanders: Giants
- Hot Head (novel), a 1992 science fiction novel by Simon Ings
- "Hot Head", a song by Death Grips from the album Bottomless Pit
- Hotheads, an album by Boiled in Lead
