= AvrPphB SUSCEPTIBLE 1 =

Plant immunological decoy protein

AvrPphB SUSCEPTIBLE 1/PBS1 is a protein kinase acting upon serine and threonine. It is a receptor-like cytoplasmic kinase, of Subfamily VII. It is the guardee of RESISTANCE TO PSEUDOMONAS SYRINGAE 5/RPS5. PBS1 is cleaved by an effector, AvrPphB, used by Pseudomonas syringae pv. phaseolicola, serving as an immunological decoy to signal RPS5 that an attack is underway as reviewed by Kourelis et al. 2016.

== Evolutionary history ==
Targets are under so much pressure from effectors that McDowell & Simon 2006 expected PBS1 to experience diversifying selection. They looked forward to results finding little sequence affinity, an entire family of PBS1s, and radiation across descendant plant species.

However just a few years later PBS1 was demonstrated by Caldwell and Michelmore 2009 to be one of the most conserved proteins in all flowering plants. Further, they found it to be so widespread that it must have yet-undiscovered function(s): It is found widely even in taxa with no RPS5 guard. They speculate that these other functions are so vital that PBS1 is being prevented from otherwise adapting to effectors - thus possibly dumping that evolutionary pressure onto the nucleotide-binding leucine-rich repeat receptors guarding it instead.

They also found this to make PBS1 an even more useful modifiable immune decoy, as it is recognized by a wider array of convergently evolved immune proteins than just RPS5.

== Orthologs ==
One model and many economic plants are known to have multiple orthologs per genome:

- AtPBS1 - in the model Arabidopsis thaliana

- AtPBS1^{5 x Alanine} - with a 5-Alanine insertion to produce a gape in the cleavage site, falsely mimicking constant cleavage by the effector

- GmPBS1 - in Glycine max

- GmPBS1–1

- GmPBS1–1^{5 x Alanine} - same results as the 5xAla AtPBS1 above

- GmPBS1^{SMV} - against Soybean Mosaic Virus

- PBS1^{RCS2} - against the Type-III effector of AvrRpt2 produced by P. syringae
- PBS1^{TCS} - against the Nla protease produced by the Tobacco Etch Virus (TEV)
- PBS1^{TuMV} - against the Nla protease produced by the Turnip Mosaic Virus (TuMV)

== Future research ==
As of 2020 Indiana University (home of Pottinger and Innes) is prosecuting a family of patents for the RPS5-PBS1 decoy system. In the future it is expected that modified PBS1 decoys will become cheaper and easier to make as unrelated molecular genetics technologies improve. This system will only be deployable against effectors which act intracellularly within the host, as PBS1 is not located in any extracellular locations. The determination of the structure of ZAR1 has been useful in understanding NLRs in general, and that information will continue to be applied to understand and develop PBS1s.
