= BZIP intron saccharomycetales =

Consensus secondary structure and sequence conservation of bZIP intron in Saccharomycetales

The bZIP intron saccharomycetales is an unconventional bZIP intron located in the HAC1 mRNA in most budding yeast belonging to Saccharomycetales order. The structure consists of two hairpins with their loop regions defining 5’ and 3’ splice sites and a long, poorly conserved sequence separating them. In some species this poorly conserved region can pair with the 5’ UTR of the HAC1 mRNA forming a pseudoknot, which stalls the translation. The unconventional splicing is performed by an endoribonuclease Ire1 in response to ER stress and it was first shown in Saccharomyces cerevisiae.
