= Laibach (Ruthebach) =

River in North Rhine-Westphalia, Germany

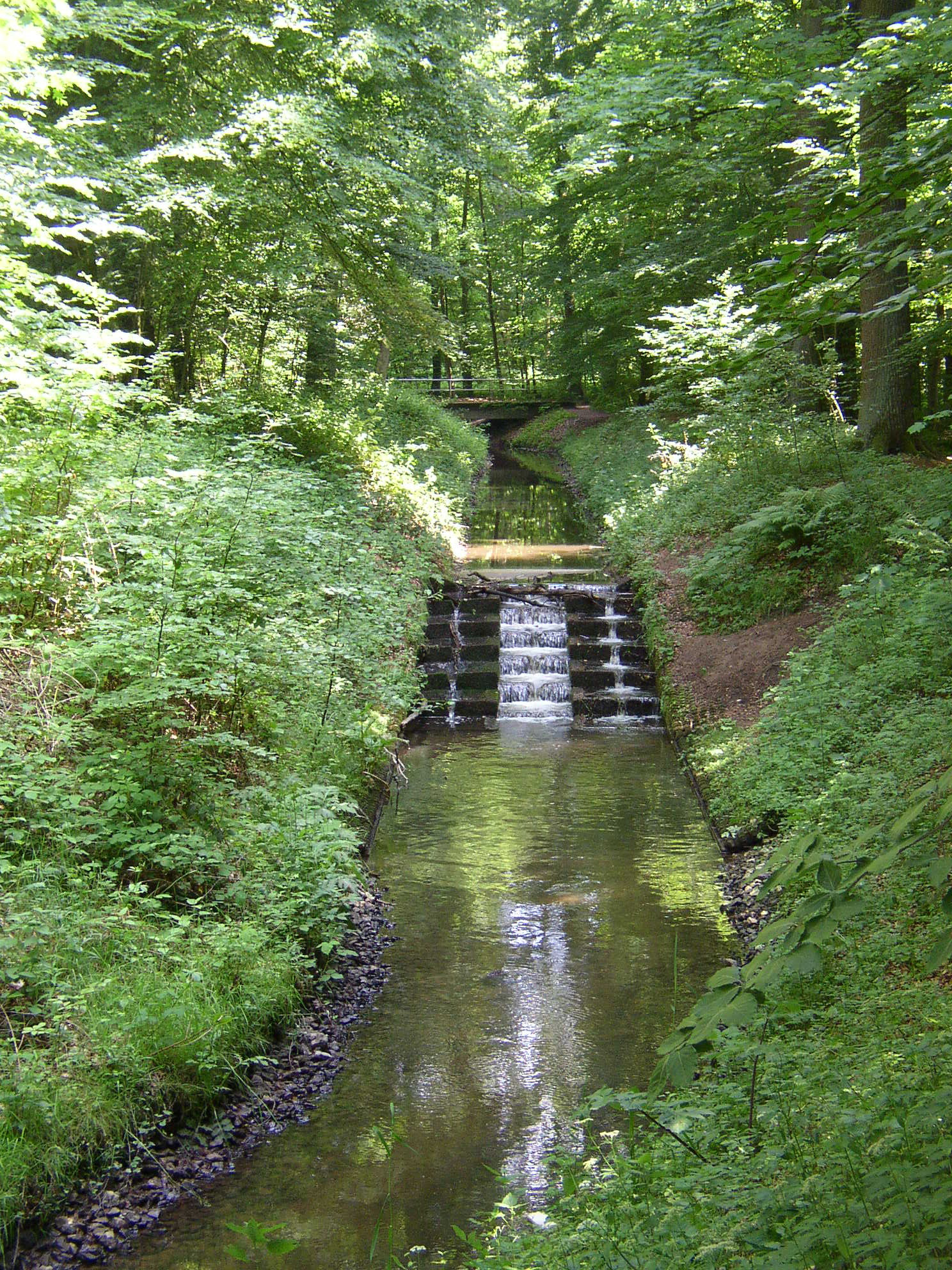

Location
- Country: Germany
- State: North Rhine-Westphalia

Physical characteristics
- Source
  - coordinates: 52.0816°N 8.3754°E
- Mouth
  - location: into the Ruthebach
  - coordinates: 52.0591°N 8.3310°E

Basin features
- Progression: Ruthebach→ Loddenbach→ Ems→ North Sea

Laibach is a river of North Rhine-Westphalia, Germany, near Halle (Westfalen). It is the left headstream of the Ruthebach.

It should not be confused with the upper course of the Rhedaer Bach that is often also called Laibach.

== See also ==
- List of rivers of North Rhine-Westphalia
