= Novosphingobium aquaticum =

Scientific classification
- Domain: Bacteria
- Kingdom: Pseudomonadati
- Phylum: Pseudomonadota
- Class: Alphaproteobacteria
- Order: Sphingomonadales
- Family: Erythrobacteraceae
- Genus: Novosphingobium
- Species: N. aquaticum

Binomial name
- Novosphingobium aquaticum Glaeser et al. 2013

Type strain
- CCM 7983, DSM 25088, FNE08-86

Species of bacterium

Novosphingobium aquaticum is a Gram-negative, rod-shaped, strictly aerobic and non-motile bacterium from the genus Novosphingobium which has been isolated from lake water in Suwon in Korea.
