= Novosphingobium soli =

Scientific classification
- Domain: Bacteria
- Kingdom: Pseudomonadati
- Phylum: Pseudomonadota
- Class: Alphaproteobacteria
- Order: Sphingomonadales
- Family: Sphingomonadaceae
- Genus: Novosphingobium
- Species: N. soli

Binomial name
- Novosphingobium soli Kämpfer et al. 2011

Type strain
- CCM 7706, CCUG 58493, DSM 22821, CC-TPE-1

Species of bacterium

Novosphingobium soli is a Gram-negative, rod-shaped and non-spore-forming bacterium from the genus Novosphingobium which has been isolated from oil-contaminated soil near an oil refinery in Kaohsiung County in Taiwan.
