= Novosphingobium malaysiense =

Scientific classification
- Domain: Bacteria
- Kingdom: Pseudomonadati
- Phylum: Pseudomonadota
- Class: Alphaproteobacteria
- Order: Sphingomonadales
- Family: Sphingomonadaceae
- Genus: Novosphingobium
- Species: N. malaysiense

Binomial name
- Novosphingobium malaysiense Lee et al. 2014

Type strain
- DSM 27798, MCCC 1A00645, NBRC 109947, MUSC 273

Species of bacterium

Novosphingobium malaysiense is a Gram-negative, rod-shaped and non-spore-forming bacterium from the genus Novosphingobium which has been isolated from mangrove soil from the Tanjung Lumpur river in Pahang in Malaysia.
