= Novosphingobium oryzae =

Scientific classification
- Domain: Bacteria
- Kingdom: Pseudomonadati
- Phylum: Pseudomonadota
- Class: Alphaproteobacteria
- Order: Sphingomonadales
- Family: Sphingomonadaceae
- Genus: Novosphingobium
- Species: N. oryzae

Binomial name
- Novosphingobium oryzae Zhang et al. 2016

Type strain
- ACCC 06131, JCM 30537, ZYY112

Species of bacterium

Novosphingobium oryzae is a plant-promoting bacterium from the genus Novosphingobium.
