= Novosphingobium chloroacetimidivorans =

Scientific classification
- Domain: Bacteria
- Kingdom: Pseudomonadati
- Phylum: Pseudomonadota
- Class: Alphaproteobacteria
- Order: Sphingomonadales
- Family: Sphingomonadaceae
- Genus: Novosphingobium
- Species: N. chloroacetimidivorans

Binomial name
- Novosphingobium chloroacetimidivorans Chen et al. 2014

Type strain
- CCTCC AB 2013086, JCM 19923, KACC 17147, BUT-14

Species of bacterium

Novosphingobium chloroacetimidivorans is a Gram-negative, chloroacetamide-degrading and non-spore-forming bacterium from the genus Novosphingobium which has been isolated from activated sludge from a wastewater treatment plant in Kunshan City in China.
