= Novosphingobium sediminicola =

Scientific classification
- Domain: Bacteria
- Kingdom: Pseudomonadati
- Phylum: Pseudomonadota
- Class: Alphaproteobacteria
- Order: Sphingomonadales
- Family: Sphingomonadaceae
- Genus: Novosphingobium
- Species: N. sediminicola

Binomial name
- Novosphingobium sediminicola Baek et al. 2011

Type strain
- KCTC 22311, LMG 24320, HU1-AH51

Species of bacterium

Novosphingobium sediminicola is a Gram-negative, short rod-shaped, non-spore-forming and non-motile bacterium from the genus Novosphingobium which has been isolated from freshwater sediments from the Lake Hakha in Korea.
