= Novosphingobium marinum =

Scientific classification
- Domain: Bacteria
- Kingdom: Pseudomonadati
- Phylum: Pseudomonadota
- Class: Alphaproteobacteria
- Order: Sphingomonadales
- Family: Sphingomonadaceae
- Genus: Novosphingobium
- Species: N. marinum

Binomial name
- Novosphingobium marinum Huo et al. 2015

Type strain
- LA53

Species of bacterium

Novosphingobium marinum is a Gram-negative, aerobic and short rod-shaped bacterium from the genus Novosphingobium which has been isolated from sea water from the Pacific Ocean.
