= Artade =

Database

ArtadeDB

Content
- Description: ARabidopsis Tiling-Array-based Detection of Exons
- Organisms: Arabidopsis thaliana

Contact
- Laboratory: Phenome Informatics Team, Functional Genomics Research Group, Genomic Sciences Center, Japan.
- Authors: Tetsuro Toyoda
- Primary citation: Toyoda & al. (2005)

Access
- Website: omicspace.riken.jp/ARTADE/

ARTADE (ARabidopsis Tiling Array-based Detection of Exons) is a database for the annotation of genome-wide tiling-array data in Arabidopsis

== See also ==
- DNA microarray
