= Novosphingobium =

Scientific classification
- Domain: Bacteria
- Kingdom: Pseudomonadati
- Phylum: Pseudomonadota
- Class: Alphaproteobacteria
- Order: Sphingomonadales
- Family: Sphingomonadaceae
- Genus: Novosphingobium; Takeuchi et al. 2001

Species
- See text

Genus of bacteria

Novosphingobium is a genus of Gram-negative bacteria that includes N. taihuense, which can degrade aromatic compounds such as phenol, aniline, nitrobenzene and phenanthrene. The species N. aromativorans, which was first found in Ulsan Bay, similarly degrades aromatic molecules of two to five rings.

== Species ==
=== Accepted Species ===
Novosphingobium comprises the following species:

- Novosphingobium acidiphilum Glaeser et al. 2009
- Novosphingobium aquaticum Glaeser et al. 2013
- Novosphingobium aquimarinum Le et al. 2020
- Novosphingobium aquiterrae Lee et al. 2014
- Novosphingobium arabidopsis Lin et al. 2014
- Novosphingobium aromaticivorans corrig. (Balkwill et al. 1997) Takeuchi et al. 2001
- Novosphingobium arvoryzae Sheu et al. 2018
- Novosphingobium barchaimii Niharika et al. 2013
- Novosphingobium bradum Sheu et al. 2016
- Novosphingobium capsulatum (Leifson 1962) Takeuchi et al. 2001
- Novosphingobium chloroacetimidivorans Chen et al. 2014
- Novosphingobium clariflavum Zhang et al. 2017
- Novosphingobium colocasiae Chen et al. 2016
- Novosphingobium endophyticum Li et al. 2016
- Novosphingobium flavum Nguyen et al. 2016
- Novosphingobium fluoreni Gao et al. 2015
- Novosphingobium fontis Sheu et al. 2017
- Novosphingobium fuchskuhlense Glaeser et al. 2013
- Novosphingobium gossypii Kämpfer et al. 2015
- Novosphingobium guangzhouense Sha et al. 2017
- Novosphingobium hassiacum Kämpfer et al. 2002
- Novosphingobium humi Hyeon et al. 2017
- Novosphingobium indicum Yuan et al. 2009
- Novosphingobium ipomoeae Chen et al. 2017
- Novosphingobium kunmingense Xie et al. 2014
- Novosphingobium lentum Tiirola et al. 2005
- Novosphingobium lindaniclasticum Saxena et al. 2013
- Novosphingobium lotistagni Ngo et al. 2016
- Novosphingobium lubricantis Kämpfer et al. 2018
- Novosphingobium malaysiense Lee et al. 2014
- Novosphingobium marinum Huo et al. 2015
- Novosphingobium mathurense Gupta et al. 2009
- Novosphingobium meiothermophilum Xian et al. 2019
- Novosphingobium naphthae Chaudhary and Kim 2016
- Novosphingobium naphthalenivorans Suzuki and Hiraishi 2008
- Novosphingobium nitrogenifigens Addison et al. 2007
- Novosphingobium olei Chaudhary et al. 2021
- Novosphingobium oryzae Zhang et al. 2016
- Novosphingobium ovatum Chen et al. 2020
- Novosphingobium panipatense Gupta et al. 2009
- Novosphingobium pentaromativorans Sohn et al. 2004
- Novosphingobium piscinae Sheu et al. 2016
- Novosphingobium pokkalii Krishnan et al. 2017
- Novosphingobium resinovorum (Delaporte and Daste 1956) Lim et al. 2007
- Novosphingobium rhizosphaerae Kämpfer et al. 2015
- Novosphingobium rosa corrig. (Takeuchi et al. 1995) Takeuchi et al. 2001
- Novosphingobium sediminicola Baek et al. 2011
- Novosphingobium silvae Feng et al. 2020
- Novosphingobium soli Kämpfer et al. 2011
- Novosphingobium stygium corrig. (Balkwill et al. 1997) Takeuchi et al. 2001
- Novosphingobium subterraneum corrig. (Balkwill et al. 1997) Takeuchi et al. 2001
- Novosphingobium taihuense Liu et al. 2005
- Novosphingobium umbonatum Sheu et al. 2020

=== Provisional Species ===
The following species names have been published, but not validated according to the Bacteriological Code:

- "Novosphingobium aquaticum" Singh et al. 2015
- "Novosphingobium ginsenosidimutans" Kim et al. 2013
- "Novosphingobium profundi" Zhang et al. 2017
- "Novosphingobium sediminis" Li et al. 2012
- "Novosphingobium tardum" Chen et al. 2015
