= Novosphingobium endophyticum =

Scientific classification
- Domain: Bacteria
- Kingdom: Pseudomonadati
- Phylum: Pseudomonadota
- Class: Alphaproteobacteria
- Order: Sphingomonadales
- Family: Sphingomonadaceae
- Genus: Novosphingobium
- Species: N. endophyticum

Binomial name
- Novosphingobium endophyticum Li et al. 2016

Species of bacterium

Novosphingobium endophyticum is a Gram-negative, rod-shaped and aerobic bacterium from the genus Novosphingobium which has been isolated from the roots of the plant Glycyrrhiza uralensis from Yuli County in China.
