= Novosphingobium indicum =

Scientific classification
- Domain: Bacteria
- Kingdom: Pseudomonadati
- Phylum: Pseudomonadota
- Class: Alphaproteobacteria
- Order: Sphingomonadales
- Family: Sphingomonadaceae
- Genus: Novosphingobium
- Species: N. indicum

Binomial name
- Novosphingobium indicum Yuan et al. 2009

Type strain
- CGMCC 1.6784, H25, Lai H25, LMG 24628, LMG 24713, MCCC 1A01080

Synonyms
- Novosphingobium indian

Species of bacterium

Novosphingobium indicum is a bacterium from the genus Novosphingobium which has been isolated from deep-sea water from the Indian Ocean. Novosphingobium indicum has the ability to degrade polycyclic aromatic hydrocarbon.
