= Novosphingobium acidiphilum =

Scientific classification
- Domain: Bacteria
- Kingdom: Pseudomonadati
- Phylum: Pseudomonadota
- Class: Alphaproteobacteria
- Order: Sphingomonadales
- Family: Sphingomonadaceae
- Genus: Novosphingobium
- Species: N. acidiphilum

Binomial name
- Novosphingobium acidiphilum Glaeser et al. 2009

Type strain
- CCM 7496, CCUG 55538, DSM 19966, FSW06-204d

Synonyms
- Sphingomonas pentaromativorans

Species of bacterium

Novosphingobium acidiphilum is a Gram-negative, rod-shaped, acidophilic, non-spore-forming and motile bacterium from the genus of Novosphingobium which has been isolated from the subsurface water of the lake Grosse Fuchskuhle in Brandenburg in Germany.
