= Novosphingobium fluoreni =

Scientific classification
- Domain: Bacteria
- Kingdom: Pseudomonadati
- Phylum: Pseudomonadota
- Class: Alphaproteobacteria
- Order: Sphingomonadales
- Family: Sphingomonadaceae
- Genus: Novosphingobium
- Species: N. fluoreni

Binomial name
- Novosphingobium fluoreni Gao et al. 2015

Type strain
- ACCC19180, DSM 27568, HLJ-RS18

Species of bacterium

Novosphingobium fluoreni is a Gram-negative, fluorene-degrading, rod-shaped and non-spore-forming bacterium from the genus Novosphingobium which has been isolated rice seeds from Jiansanjiang in China.
