= Novosphingobium gossypii =

Scientific classification
- Domain: Bacteria
- Kingdom: Pseudomonadati
- Phylum: Pseudomonadota
- Class: Alphaproteobacteria
- Order: Sphingomonadales
- Family: Sphingomonadaceae
- Genus: Novosphingobium
- Species: N. gossypii

Binomial name
- Novosphingobium gossypii Kämpfer et al. 2015

Type strain
- CCM 8569, CIP 110884, LMG 28605, JM-1396

Species of bacterium

Novosphingobium gossypii is a Gram-negative, rod-shaped and non-spore-forming bacterium from the genus Novosphingobium which has been isolated from tissues from the plant Gossypium hirsutum (cotton).
