= BZIP intron ascomycota =

Consensus secondary structure and sequence conservation of bZIP intron motif in Ascomycota

The bZIP intron ascomycota is an unconventional bZIP intron found in some of the Ascomycota fungi, mainly in filamentous fungi from Pezizomycotina subphylum. The structure consists of two hairpins: a longer on at the 5′ and a shorter one at the 3’. Loop regions of the hairpins define the position of splice sites recognised by endoribonuclease Ire1 in response to ER stress. The unconventional splicing in this group results in excising introns of typical length 20 or 23 nt and it was first described in Trichoderma reesei and Aspergillus nidulans hacA mRNAs.
