= Novosphingobium hassiacum =

Scientific classification
- Domain: Bacteria
- Kingdom: Pseudomonadati
- Phylum: Pseudomonadota
- Class: Alphaproteobacteria
- Order: Sphingomonadales
- Family: Sphingomonadaceae
- Genus: Novosphingobium
- Species: N. hassiacum

Binomial name
- Novosphingobium hassiacum Kämpfer et al. 2002

Type strain
- CCUG 46891, CCUG 48038, CIP 107176, DGI2-11, DSM 14552, W-51

Species of bacterium

Novosphingobium hassiacum is a Gram-negative bacterium from the genus Novosphingobium which has been isolated from a sewage pond in Germany.
