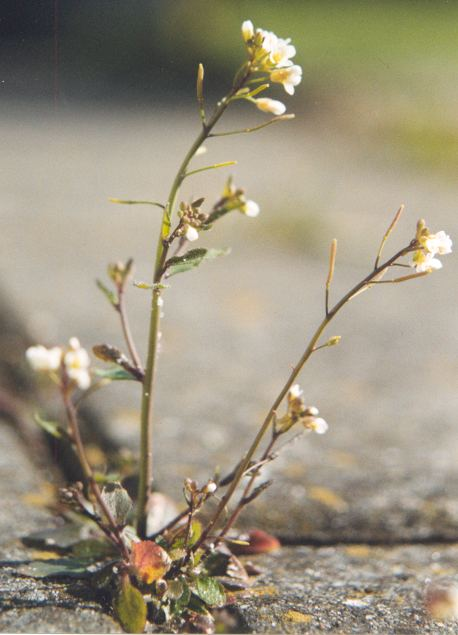

Scientific classification
- Kingdom: Plantae
- Clade: Tracheophytes
- Clade: Angiosperms
- Clade: Eudicots
- Clade: Rosids
- Order: Brassicales
- Family: Brassicaceae
- Genus: Arabidopsis
- Species: A. thaliana

Binomial name
- Arabidopsis thaliana (L.) Heynh.
- The range of Arabidopsis thaliana.: Countries where A. thaliana is native; Countries where A. thaliana is naturalized; Countries where A. thaliana is not found

Synonyms
- Arabis thaliana

= Arabidopsis thaliana =

Model plant species in the family Brassicaceae

Arabidopsis thaliana, the thale cress, mouse-ear cress or arabidopsis, is a small plant from the mustard family (Brassicaceae), native to Eurasia and Africa. Commonly found along the shoulders of roads and in disturbed land, it is generally considered a weed.

A winter annual with a relatively short lifecycle, A. thaliana is a popular model organism in plant biology and genetics. For a complex multicellular eukaryote, A. thaliana has a relatively small genome of around 135 megabase pairs. It was the first plant to have its genome sequenced, and is an important tool for understanding the molecular biology of many plant traits, including flower development and light sensing.

== Description ==
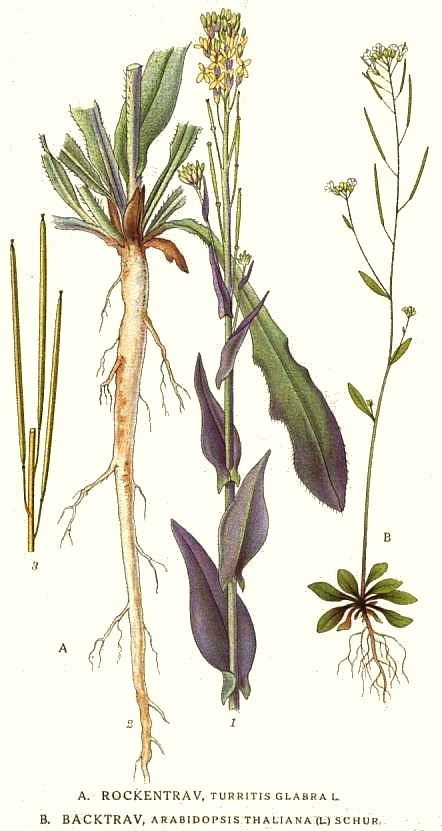
Botanical illustration

Arabidopsis thaliana is an annual (rarely biennial) plant, usually growing to 20–25 cm tall. The leaves form a rosette at the base of the plant, with a few leaves also on the flowering stem. The basal leaves are green to slightly purplish in color, 1.5–5 cm long, and 2–10 mm broad, with an entire to coarsely serrated margin; the stem leaves are smaller and unstalked, usually with an entire margin. Leaves are covered with small, unicellular hairs called trichomes. The flowers are 3 mm in diameter, arranged in a corymb; their structure is that of the typical Brassicaceae. The fruit is a silique 5–20 mm long, containing 20–30 seeds. Roots are simple in structure, with a single primary root that grows vertically downward, later producing smaller lateral roots. These roots form interactions with rhizosphere bacteria such as Bacillus megaterium.

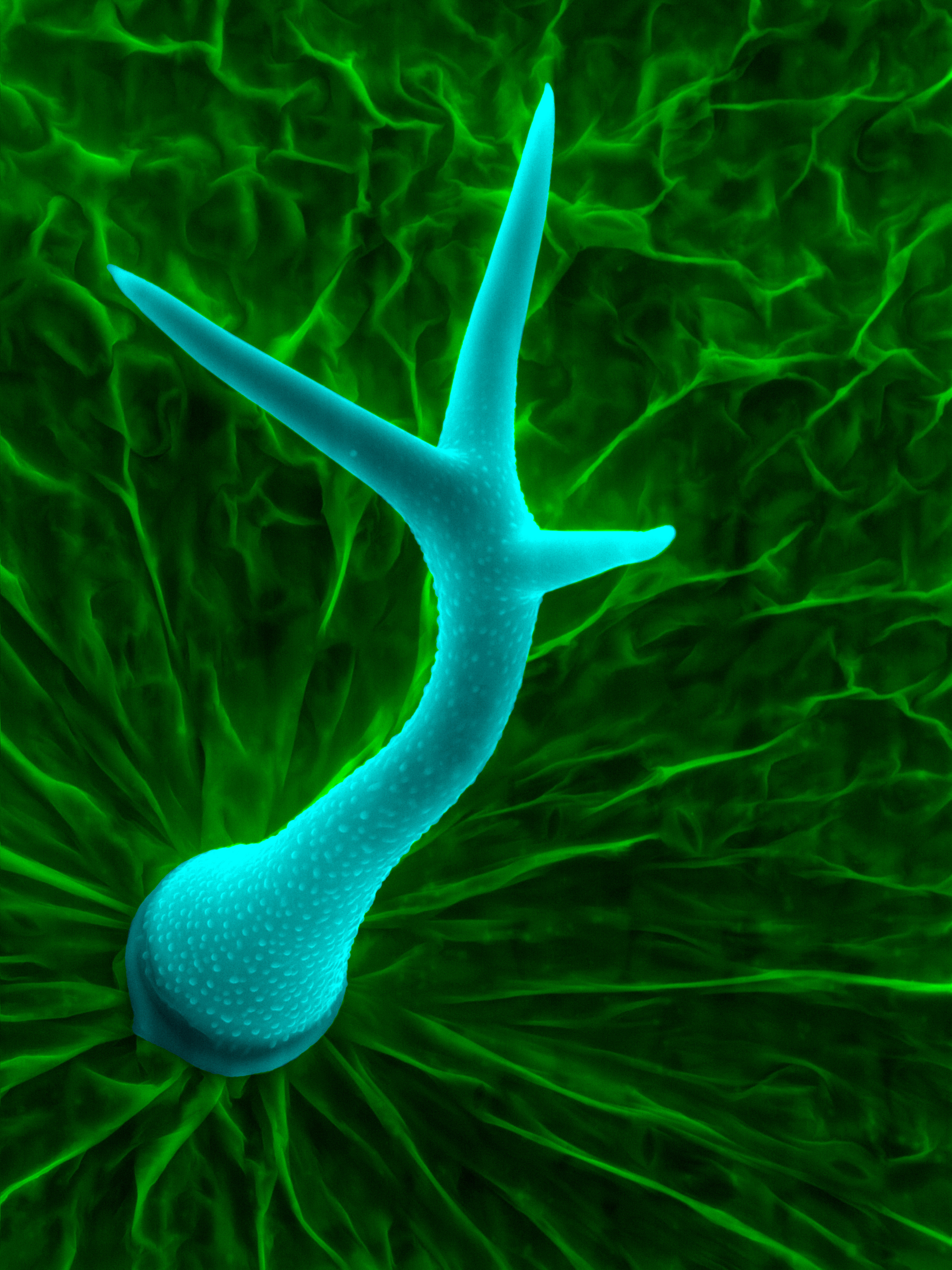
Scanning electron micrograph of a trichome, a leaf hair of A. thaliana, a unique structure made of a single cell

A. thaliana can complete its entire lifecycle in six weeks. The central stem that produces flowers grows after about 3 weeks, and the flowers naturally self-pollinate. In the lab, A. thaliana may be grown in Petri plates, pots, or hydroponics, under fluorescent lights or in a greenhouse.

== Taxonomy ==
The plant was first described in 1577 in the Harz Mountains by Johannes Thal (1542–1583), a physician from Nordhausen, Thüringen, Germany, who called it Pilosella siliquosa. In 1753, Carl Linnaeus renamed the plant Arabis thaliana in honor of Thal. In 1842, German botanist Gustav Heynhold erected the new genus Arabidopsis and placed the plant in that genus. The generic name, Arabidopsis, comes from Greek, meaning "resembling Arabis" (the genus in which Linnaeus had initially placed it).

Thousands of natural inbred accessions of A. thaliana have been collected from throughout its natural and introduced range. These accessions exhibit considerable genetic and phenotypic variation, which can be used to study the adaptation of this species to different environments.

== Distribution and habitat ==
A. thaliana is native to Europe, Asia, and Africa, and its geographic distribution is rather continuous from the Mediterranean to Scandinavia and Spain to Greece. It also appears to be native in tropical alpine ecosystems in Africa and perhaps South Africa. It has been introduced and naturalized worldwide, including in North America around the 17th century.

A. thaliana readily grows and often pioneers rocky, sandy, and calcareous soils. It is generally considered a weed, due to its widespread distribution in agricultural fields, roadsides, railway lines, waste ground, and other disturbed habitats, but due to its limited competitive ability and small size, it is not categorized as a noxious weed. Like most Brassicaceae species, A. thaliana is edible by humans in a salad or cooked, but its use as a spring vegetable is not widespread.

== Use as a model organism ==
Botanists and biologists began to research A. thaliana in the early 1900s, and the first systematic description of mutants was done around 1945. A. thaliana is now widely used for studying plant sciences, including genetics, evolution, population genetics, and plant development. Although A. thaliana the plant has little direct significance for agriculture, A. thaliana the model organism has revolutionized our understanding of the genetic, cellular, and molecular biology of flowering plants.

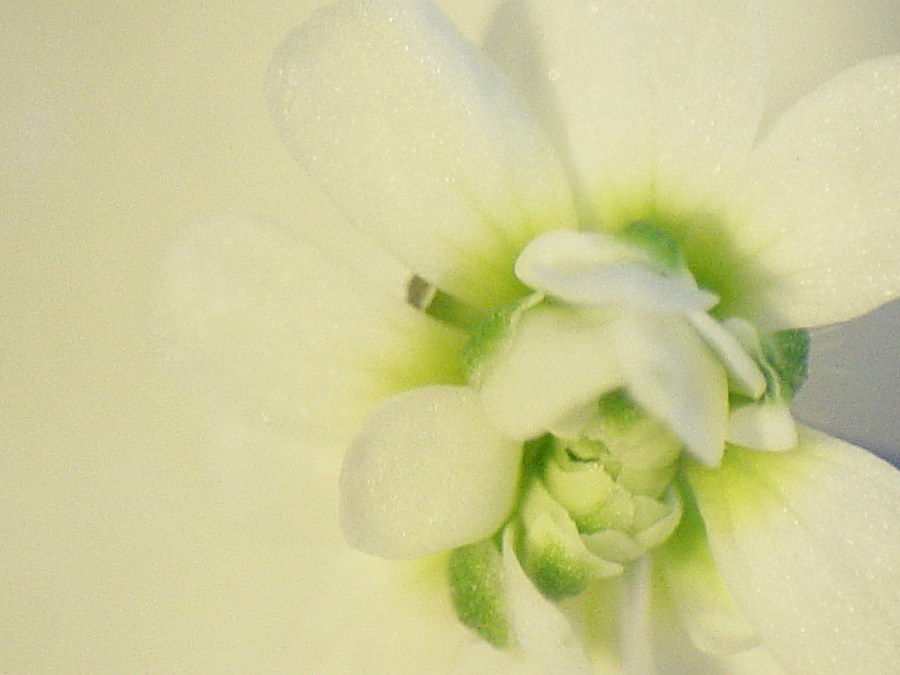
A double-flower mutant, first documented in 1873

The first mutant in A. thaliana was documented in 1873 by Alexander Braun, describing a double flower phenotype (the mutated gene was likely Agamous, cloned and characterized in 1990). Friedrich Laibach (who had published the chromosome number in 1907) did not propose A. thaliana as a model organism, though, until 1943. His student, Erna Reinholz, published her thesis on A. thaliana in 1945, describing the first collection of A. thaliana mutants that they generated using X-ray mutagenesis. Laibach continued his important contributions to A. thaliana research by collecting a large number of accessions (often questionably referred to as "ecotypes"). With the help of Albert Kranz, these were organised into a large collection of 750 natural accessions of A. thaliana from around the world.

In the 1950s and 1960s, John Langridge and George Rédei played an important role in establishing A. thaliana as a useful organism for biological laboratory experiments. Rédei wrote several scholarly reviews instrumental in introducing the model to the scientific community. The start of the A. thaliana research community dates to a newsletter called Arabidopsis Information Service, established in 1964. The first International Arabidopsis Conference was held in 1965, in Göttingen, Germany.

In the 1980s, A. thaliana started to become widely used in plant research laboratories around the world. It was one of several candidates that included maize, petunia, and tobacco. The latter two were attractive, since they were easily transformable with the then-current technologies, while maize was a well-established genetic model for plant biology. The breakthrough year for A. thaliana as a model plant was 1986, in which T-DNA-mediated transformation and the first cloned A. thaliana gene were described.

=== Genomics ===
Chloroplast genome map of A. thaliana: Introns are in grey. Some genes consist of 5′ and 3′ portions. Strand 1 and 2 genes are transcribed clockwise and counterclockwise, respectively. The innermost circle provides the boundaries of the large and small single-copy regions (LSC and SSC, violet) separated by a pair of inverted repeats (IRa and IRB, black).

==== Nuclear genome ====
Due to the small size of its genome, and because it is diploid, Arabidopsis thaliana is useful for genetic mapping and sequencing — with about 157 megabase pairs and five chromosomes, A. thaliana has one of the smallest genomes among plants. It was long thought to have the smallest genome of all flowering plants, but that title is now considered to belong to plants in the genus Genlisea, order Lamiales, with Genlisea tuberosa, a carnivorous plant, showing a genome size of approximately 61 Mbp. It was the first plant genome to be sequenced, completed in 2000 by the Arabidopsis Genome Initiative. The most up-to-date version of the A. thaliana genome is maintained by The Arabidopsis Information Resource (TAIR).

The genome encodes ~27,600 protein-coding genes and about 6,500 non-coding genes. However, the Uniprot database lists 39,342 proteins in their Arabidopsis reference proteome. Among the 27,600 protein-coding genes 25,402 (91.8%) are now annotated with "meaningful" product names, although a large fraction of these proteins is likely only poorly understood and only known in general terms (e.g. as "DNA-binding protein without known specificity"). Uniprot lists more than 3,000 proteins as "uncharacterized" as part of the reference proteome.

==== Chloroplast genome ====
The plastome of A. thaliana is a 154,478 base-pair-long DNA molecule, a size typically encountered in most flowering plants (see the list of sequenced plastomes). It comprises 136 genes coding for small subunit ribosomal proteins (rps, in yellow: see figure), large subunit ribosomal proteins (rpl, orange), hypothetical chloroplast open reading frame proteins (ycf, lemon), proteins involved in photosynthetic reactions (green) or in other functions (red), ribosomal RNAs (rrn, blue), and transfer RNAs (trn, black).

==== Mitochondrial genome ====
The mitochondrial genome of A. thaliana is 367,808 base pairs long and contains 57 genes. There are many repeated regions in the A. thaliana mitochondrial genome. The largest repeats recombine regularly and isomerize the genome. Like most plant mitochondrial genomes, the A. thaliana mitochondrial genome exists as a complex arrangement of overlapping branched and linear molecules in vivo.

=== Genetics ===
Genetic transformation of A. thaliana is routine, using Agrobacterium tumefaciens to transfer DNA into the plant genome. The current protocol, termed "floral dip", involves simply dipping floral buds into a solution containing Agrobacterium carrying a plasmid of interest and a detergent. This method avoids the need for tissue culture or plant regeneration.

The A. thaliana gene knockout collections are a unique resource for plant biology made possible by the availability of high-throughput transformation and funding for genomics resources. The site of T-DNA insertions has been determined for over 300,000 independent transgenic lines, with the information and seeds accessible through online T-DNA databases. Through these collections, insertional mutants are available for most genes in A. thaliana.

Characterized accessions and mutant lines of A. thaliana serve as experimental material in laboratory studies. The most commonly used background lines are Ler (Landsberg erecta), and Col, or Columbia. Other background lines less-often cited in the scientific literature are Ws, or Wassilewskija, C24, Cvi, or Cape Verde Islands, Nossen, etc. (see for ex.) Sets of closely related accessions named Col-0, Col-1, etc., have been obtained and characterized; in general, mutant lines are available through stock centers, of which best-known are the Nottingham Arabidopsis Stock Center-NASC and the Arabidopsis Biological Resource Center-ABRC in Ohio, USA. The Col-0 accession was selected by Rédei from within a (nonirradiated) population of seeds designated 'Landsberg' which he received from Laibach. Columbia (named for the location of Rédei's former institution, University of Missouri-Columbia) was the reference accession sequenced in the Arabidopsis Genome Initiative. The Later (Landsberg erecta) line was selected by Rédei (because of its short stature) from a Landsberg population he had mutagenized with X-rays. As the Ler collection of mutants is derived from this initial line, Ler-0 does not correspond to the Landsberg accessions, which designated La-0, La-1, etc.

Trichome formation is initiated by the GLABROUS1 protein. Knockouts of the corresponding gene lead to glabrous plants. This phenotype has already been used in gene editing experiments and might be of interest as visual marker for plant research to improve gene editing methods such as CRISPR/Cas9.

==== Non-Mendelian inheritance controversy ====
In 2005, scientists at Purdue University proposed that A. thaliana possessed an alternative to previously known mechanisms of DNA repair, producing an unusual pattern of inheritance, but the phenomenon observed (reversion of mutant copies of the HOTHEAD gene to a wild-type state) was later suggested to be an artifact because the mutants show increased outcrossing due to organ fusion.

=== Lifecycle ===
The plant's small size and rapid lifecycle are also advantageous for research. Having specialized as a spring ephemeral, it has been used to found several laboratory strains that take about 6 weeks from germination to mature seed. The small size of the plant is convenient for cultivation in a small space, and it produces many seeds. Further, the selfing nature of this plant assists genetic experiments. Also, as an individual plant can produce several thousand seeds, each of the above criteria leads to A. thaliana being valued as a genetic model organism.

=== Cellular biology ===
Arabidopsis is often the model for study of SNAREs in plants. This has shown SNAREs to be heavily involved in vesicle trafficking. Zheng et al. 1999 found an arabidopsis SNARE called AtVTI1a is probably essential to Golgi-vacuole trafficking. This is still a wide open field and plant SNAREs' role in trafficking remains understudied.

=== DNA repair ===
The DNA of plants is vulnerable to ultraviolet light, and DNA repair mechanisms have evolved to avoid or repair genome damage caused by UV. Kaiser et al. showed that in A. thaliana cyclobutane pyrimidine dimers (CPDs) induced by UV light can be repaired by expression of CPD photolyase.

=== Germination in lunar regolith ===
On 12 May 2022, NASA announced that specimens of Arabidopsis thaliana had been successfully germinated and grown in samples of lunar regolith. While the plants successfully germinated and grew into seedlings, they were not as robust as specimens that had been grown in volcanic ash as a control group, although the experiments also found some variation in the plants grown in regolith based on the location the samples were taken from, as A. thaliana grown in regolith gathered during Apollo 12 & Apollo 17 were more robust than those grown in samples taken during Apollo 11.

== Development ==
=== Flower development ===
A. thaliana has been extensively studied as a model for flower development. The developing flower has four basic organs - sepals, petals, stamens, and carpels (which go on to form pistils). These organs are arranged in a series of whorls, four sepals on the outer whorl, followed by four petals inside this, six stamens, and a central carpel region. Homeotic mutations in A. thaliana result in the change of one organ to another—in the case of the agamous mutation, for example, stamens become petals and carpels are replaced with a new flower, resulting in a recursively repeated sepal-petal-petal pattern.

The ABC model of flower development was developed through studying A. thaliana.

Observations of homeotic mutations led to the formulation of the ABC model of flower development by E. Coen and E. Meyerowitz. According to this model, floral organ identity genes are divided into three classes - class A genes (which affect sepals and petals), class B genes (which affect petals and stamens), and class C genes (which affect stamens and carpels). These genes code for transcription factors that combine to cause tissue specification in their respective regions during development. Although developed through study of A. thaliana flowers, this model is generally applicable to other flowering plants.

=== Leaf development ===
Studies of A. thaliana have provided considerable insights with regards to the genetics of leaf morphogenesis, particularly in dicotyledon-type plants. Much of the understanding has come from analyzing mutants in leaf development, some of which were identified in the 1960s, but were not analysed with genetic and molecular techniques until the mid-1990s. A. thaliana leaves are well suited to studies of leaf development because they are relatively simple and stable.

Using A. thaliana, the genetics behind leaf shape development have become more clear and have been broken down into three stages: The initiation of the leaf primordium, the establishment of dorsiventrality, and the development of a marginal meristem. Leaf primordia are initiated by the suppression of the genes and proteins of class I KNOX family (such as SHOOT APICAL MERISTEMLESS). These class I KNOX proteins directly suppress gibberellin biosynthesis in the leaf primordium. Many genetic factors were found to be involved in the suppression of these class I KNOX genes in leaf primordia (such as ASYMMETRIC LEAVES1, BLADE-ON-PETIOLE1, SAWTOOTH1, etc.). Thus, with this suppression, the levels of gibberellin increase and leaf primordium initiate growth.

The establishment of leaf dorsiventrality is important since the dorsal (adaxial) surface of the leaf is different from the ventral (abaxial) surface.

=== Microscopy ===
A. thaliana is well suited for light microscopy analysis. Young seedlings on the whole, and their roots in particular, are relatively translucent. This, together with their small size, facilitates live cell imaging using both fluorescence and confocal laser scanning microscopy. By wet-mounting seedlings in water or in culture media, plants may be imaged uninvasively, obviating the need for fixation and sectioning and allowing time-lapse measurements. Fluorescent protein constructs can be introduced through transformation. The developmental stage of each cell can be inferred from its location in the plant or by using fluorescent protein markers, allowing detailed developmental analysis.

== Physiology ==
=== Light sensing, light emission, and circadian biology ===
The photoreceptors phytochromes A, B, C, D, and E mediate red light-based phototropic response. Understanding the function of these receptors has helped plant biologists understand the signaling cascades that regulate photoperiodism, germination, de-etiolation, and shade avoidance in plants. The genes FCA, fy, fpa, LUMINIDEPENDENS (ld), fly, fve and FLOWERING LOCUS C (FLC) are involved in photoperiod triggering of flowering and vernalization. Specifically Lee et al. 1994 find ld produces a homeodomain and Blazquez et al. 2001 that fve produces a WD40 repeat.

The UVR8 protein detects UV-B light and mediates the response to this DNA-damaging wavelength.

A. thaliana was used extensively in the study of the genetic basis of phototropism, chloroplast alignment, and stomal aperture and other blue light-influenced processes. These traits respond to blue light, which is perceived by the phototropin light receptors. Arabidopsis has also been important in understanding the functions of another blue light receptor, cryptochrome, which is especially important for light entrainment to control the plants' circadian rhythms. When the onset of darkness is unusually early, A. thaliana reduces its metabolism of starch by an amount that effectively requires division.

Light responses were even found in roots, previously thought to be largely insensitive to light. While the gravitropic response of A. thaliana root organs is their predominant tropic response, specimens treated with mutagens and selected for the absence of gravitropic action showed negative phototropic response to blue or white light, and positive response to red light, indicating that the roots also show positive phototropism.

In 2000, Dr. Janet Braam of Rice University genetically engineered A. thaliana to glow in the dark when touched. The effect was visible to ultrasensitive cameras.

Multiple efforts, including the Glowing Plant project, have sought to use A. thaliana to increase plant luminescence intensity towards commercially viable levels.

=== Thigmomorphogenesis (Touch response) ===
In 1990, Janet Braam and Ronald W. Davis determined that A. thaliana exhibits thigmomorphogenesis in response to wind, rain and touch. Four or more touch induced genes in A. thaliana were found to be regulated by such stimuli. In 2002, Massimo Pigliucci found that A. thaliana developed different patterns of branching in response to sustained exposure to wind, a display of phenotypic plasticity.

=== On the Moon ===
On 2 January 2019, China's Chang'e-4 lander brought A. thaliana to the moon. A small microcosm 'tin' in the lander contained A. thaliana, seeds of potatoes, and silkworm eggs. As plants would support the silkworms with oxygen, and the silkworms would in turn provide the plants with necessary carbon dioxide and nutrients through their waste, researchers will evaluate whether plants successfully perform photosynthesis, and grow and bloom in the lunar environment. Although the potato, cotton and Arabidopsis sprouted and the cotton sprouted two leaves, all the plants died shortly after germination.

=== Secondary metabolites ===
Thalianin is an Arabidopsis root triterpene. Potter et al., 2018 finds synthesis is induced by a combination of at least 2 facts, cell-specific transcription factors (TFs) and the accessibility of the chromatin.

== Plant–pathogen interactions ==
Understanding how plants achieve resistance is important to protect the world's food production, and the agriculture industry. Many model systems have been developed to better understand interactions between plants and bacterial, fungal, oomycete, viral, and nematode pathogens. A. thaliana has been a powerful tool for the study of the subdiscipline of plant pathology, that is, the interaction between plants and disease-causing pathogens.

Pathogen type	Example in A. thaliana
Bacteria	Pseudomonas syringae, Xanthomonas campestris
Fungi	Colletotrichum destructivum, Botrytis cinerea, Erysiphe radulescui
Oomycete	Hyaloperonospora arabidopsidis
Viral	Cauliflower mosaic virus (CaMV), tobacco mosaic virus (TMV)
Nematode	Meloidogyne incognita, Heterodera schachtii

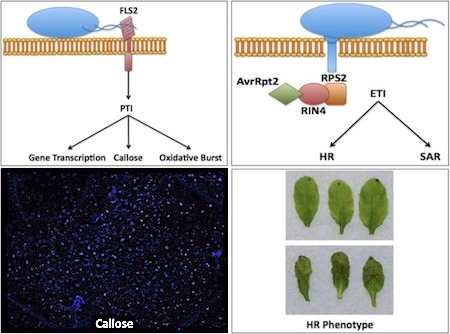
Components of pathogen recognition in A. thaliana A schematic of PAMP-triggered immunity: recognition of flagellin by FLS2 (top left); effector-triggered immunity depicted through the recognition of avrRpt2 by RPS2 through RIN4 (top-right); microscopic view of callose deposition in an A. thaliana leaf (bottom left); an example of no hypersensitive response (HR) above, and HR in A. thaliana leaves below (bottom right)

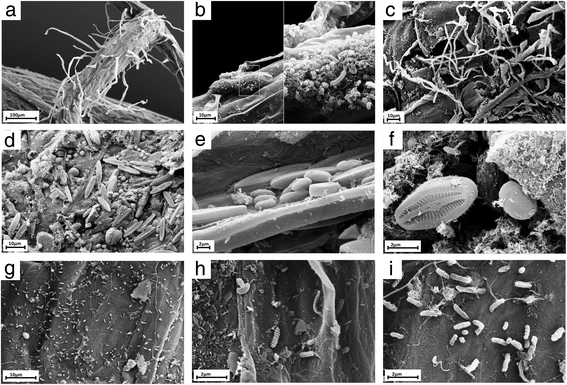
Microbial consortia naturally formed on the roots of Arabidopsis thaliana Scanning electron microscopy pictures of root surfaces from natural A. thaliana populations showing the complex microbial networks formed on roots a) Overview of an A. thaliana root (primary root) with numerous root hairs, b) Biofilm-forming bacteria, c) Fungal or oomycete hyphae surrounding the root surface, d) Primary root densely covered by spores and protists, e, f) Protists, most likely belonging to the Bacillariophyceae class, g) Bacteria and bacterial filaments, h, i) Different bacterial individuals showing great varieties of shapes and morphological features

The use of A. thaliana has led to many breakthroughs in the advancement of knowledge of how plants manifest plant disease resistance. The reason most plants are resistant to most pathogens is through nonhost resistance - not all pathogens will infect all plants. An example where A. thaliana was used to determine the genes responsible for nonhost resistance is Blumeria graminis, the causal agent of powdery mildew of grasses. A. thaliana mutants were developed using the mutagen ethyl methanesulfonate and screened to identify mutants with increased infection by B. graminis. The mutants with higher infection rates are referred to as PEN mutants due to the ability of B. graminis to penetrate A. thaliana to begin the disease process. The PEN genes were later mapped to identify the genes responsible for nonhost resistance to B. graminis.

In general, when a plant is exposed to a pathogen, or nonpathogenic microbe, an initial response, known as PAMP-triggered immunity (PTI), occurs because the plant detects conserved motifs known as pathogen-associated molecular patterns (PAMPs). These PAMPs are detected by specialized receptors in the host known as pattern recognition receptors (PRRs) on the plant cell surface.

The best-characterized PRR in A. thaliana is FLS2 (Flagellin-Sensing2), which recognizes bacterial flagellin, a specialized organelle used by microorganisms for the purpose of motility, as well as the ligand flg22, which comprises the 22 amino acids recognized by FLS2. Discovery of FLS2 was facilitated by the identification of an A. thaliana ecotype, Ws-0, that was unable to detect flg22, leading to the identification of the gene encoding FLS2. FLS2 shows striking similarity to rice XA21, the first PRR isolated in 1995. Both flagellin and UV-C act similarly to increase homologous recombination in A. thaliana, as demonstrated by Molinier et al. 2006. Beyond this somatic effect, they found this to extend to subsequent generations of the plant.

A second pattern recognition receptor, EF-Tu receptor (EFR), identified in A. thaliana, recognizes the bacterial EF-Tu protein, the prokaryotic elongation factor used in protein synthesis, as well as the laboratory-used ligand elf18. Using Agrobacterium-mediated transformation, a technique that takes advantage of the natural process by which Agrobacterium transfers genes into host plants, the EFR gene was transformed into Nicotiana benthamiana, tobacco plant that does not recognize EF-Tu, thereby permitting recognition of bacterial EF-Tu thereby confirming EFR as the receptor of EF-Tu.

Both FLS2 and EFR use similar signal transduction pathways to initiate PTI. A. thaliana has been instrumental in dissecting these pathways to better understand the regulation of immune responses, the most notable one being the mitogen-activated protein kinase (MAP kinase) cascade. Downstream responses of PTI include callose deposition, the oxidative burst, and transcription of defense-related genes.

PTI is able to combat pathogens in a nonspecific manner. A stronger and more specific response in plants is that of effector-triggered immunity (ETI), which is dependent upon the recognition of pathogen effectors, proteins secreted by the pathogen that alter functions in the host, by plant resistance genes (R-genes), often described as a gene-for-gene relationship. This recognition may occur directly or indirectly via a guardee protein in a hypothesis known as the guard hypothesis. The first R-gene cloned in A. thaliana was RPS2 (resistance to Pseudomonas syringae 2), which is responsible for recognition of the effector avrRpt2. The bacterial effector avrRpt2 is delivered into A. thaliana via the Type III secretion system of P. syringae pv. tomato strain DC3000. Recognition of avrRpt2 by RPS2 occurs via the guardee protein RIN4, which is cleaved. Recognition of a pathogen effector leads to a dramatic immune response known as the hypersensitive response, in which the infected plant cells undergo cell death to prevent the spread of the pathogen.

Systemic acquired resistance (SAR) is another example of resistance that is better understood in plants because of research done in A. thaliana. Benzothiadiazol (BTH), a salicylic acid (SA) analog, has been used historically as an antifungal compound in crop plants. BTH, as well as SA, has been shown to induce SAR in plants. The initiation of the SAR pathway was first demonstrated in A. thaliana in which increased SA levels are recognized by nonexpresser of PR genes 1 (NPR1) due to redox change in the cytosol, resulting in the reduction of NPR1. NPR1, which usually exists in a multiplex (oligomeric) state, becomes monomeric (a single unit) upon reduction. When NPR1 becomes monomeric, it translocates to the nucleus, where it interacts with many TGA transcription factors, and is able to induce pathogen-related genes such as PR1. Another example of SAR would be the research done with transgenic tobacco plants, which express bacterial salicylate hydroxylase, nahG gene, requires the accumulation of SA for its expression

Although not directly immunological, intracellular transport affects susceptibility by incorporating - or being tricked into incorporating - pathogen particles. For example, the Dynamin-related protein 2b/drp2b gene helps to move invaginated material into cells, with some mutants increasing PstDC3000 virulence even further.

=== Evolutionary aspect of plant-pathogen resistance ===
Plants are affected by multiple pathogens throughout their lifetimes. In response to the presence of pathogens, plants have evolved receptors on their cell surfaces to detect and respond to pathogens. Arabidopsis thaliana is a model organism used to determine specific defense mechanisms of plant-pathogen resistance. These plants have special receptors on their cell surfaces that allow for detection of pathogens and initiate mechanisms to inhibit pathogen growth. They contain two receptors, FLS2 (bacterial flagellin receptor) and EF-Tu (bacterial EF-Tu protein), which use signal transduction pathways to initiate the disease response pathway. The pathway leads to the recognition of the pathogen causing the infected cells to undergo cell death to stop the spread of the pathogen. Plants with FLS2 and EF-Tu receptors have shown to have increased fitness in the population. This has led to the belief that plant-pathogen resistance is an evolutionary mechanism that has built up over generations to respond to dynamic environments, such as increased predation and extreme temperatures.

A. thaliana has also been used to study SAR. This pathway uses benzothiadiazole, a chemical inducer, to induce transcription factors, mRNA, of SAR genes. This accumulation of transcription factors leads to inhibition of pathogen-related genes.

Plant-pathogen interactions are important for an understanding of how plants have evolved to combat different types of pathogens that may affect them. Variation in resistance of plants across populations is due to variation in environmental factors. Plants that have evolved resistance, whether it be the general variation or the SAR variation, have been able to live longer and hold off necrosis of their tissue (premature death of cells), which leads to better adaptation and fitness for populations that are in rapidly changing environments. In the future, comparisons of the pathosystems of wild populations and their coevolved pathogens with wild-wild hybrids of known parentage may reveal new mechanisms of balancing selection. In life history theory we may find that A. thaliana maintains certain alleles due to pleitropy between plant-pathogen effects and other traits, as in livestock.

Research in A. thaliana suggests that the immunity regulator protein family EDS1 in general co-evolved with the CC_{HELO} family of nucleotide-binding–leucine-rich-repeat-receptors (NLRs). Xiao et al. 2005 have shown that the powdery mildew immunity mediated by A. thaliana's RPW8 (which has a CC_{HELO} domain) is dependent on two members of this family: EDS1 itself and PAD4.

RESISTANCE TO PSEUDOMONAS SYRINGAE 5/RPS5 is a disease resistance protein which guards AvrPphB SUSCEPTIBLE 1/PBS1. PBS1, as the name would suggest, is the target of AvrPphB, an effector produced by Pseudomonas syringae pv. phaseolicola.

== Other research ==
Ongoing research on A. thaliana is being performed on the International Space Station by the European Space Agency. The goals are to study the growth and reproduction of plants from seed to seed in microgravity. Plant-on-a-chip devices in which A. thaliana tissues can be cultured in semi-in vitro conditions have been described. Use of these devices may aid understanding of pollen-tube guidance and the mechanism of sexual reproduction in A. thaliana.

Researchers at the University of Florida were able to grow the plant in lunar soil originating from the Sea of Tranquillity.

=== Self-pollination ===
A. thaliana is a predominantly self-pollinating plant with an outcrossing rate estimated at less than 0.3%. An analysis of the genome-wide pattern of linkage disequilibrium suggested that self-pollination evolved roughly a million years ago or more. Meioses that lead to self-pollination are unlikely to produce significant beneficial genetic variability. However, these meioses can provide the adaptive benefit of recombinational repair of DNA damages during formation of germ cells at each generation. Such a benefit may have been sufficient to allow the long-term persistence of meioses even when followed by self-fertilization. A physical mechanism for self-pollination in A. thaliana is through pre-anthesis autogamy, such that fertilisation takes place largely before flower opening.

== Databases and other resources ==
- TAIR and NASC: curated sources for diverse genetic and molecular biology information, links to gene expression databases etc.
- Arabidopsis Biological Resource Center (seed and DNA stocks)
- Nottingham Arabidopsis Stock Centre (seed and DNA stocks)
- Artade database
- AraDiv: a dataset of functional traits and leaf hyperspectral reflectance of Arabidopsis thaliana: see data repository

== See also ==
- Sexual selection in Arabidopsis thaliana
- A. thaliana responses to salinity
- BZIP intron plant
- The Thaliana Bridge, installed in 2021 at Harlow Carr was inspired by the work of the botanical scientist Rachel Leech and represents the sequence of an Arabidopsis thaliana chromosome.
- Novosphingobium arabidopsis, isolated from the rhizosphere of the plant
