= Novosphingobium rhizosphaerae =

Scientific classification
- Domain: Bacteria
- Kingdom: Pseudomonadati
- Phylum: Pseudomonadota
- Class: Alphaproteobacteria
- Order: Sphingomonadales
- Family: Sphingomonadaceae
- Genus: Novosphingobium
- Species: N. rhizosphaerae

Binomial name
- Novosphingobium rhizosphaerae Kämpfer et al. 2015

Type strain
- CCM 8547, LMG 28479, JM-1

Species of bacterium

Novosphingobium rhizosphaerae is a Gram-negative, non-spore-forming and rod-shaped bacterium from the genus Novosphingobium which has been isolated from the rhizosphere of the corn plant Zea mays in Tallassee, Alabama in the United States.
