= Novosphingobium lindaniclasticum =

Scientific classification
- Domain: Bacteria
- Kingdom: Pseudomonadati
- Phylum: Pseudomonadota
- Class: Alphaproteobacteria
- Order: Sphingomonadales
- Family: Sphingomonadaceae
- Genus: Novosphingobium
- Species: N. lindaniclasticum

Binomial name
- Novosphingobium lindaniclasticum Saxena et al. 2013

Type strain
- CCM 7976, DSM 25409, LE124

Species of bacterium

Novosphingobium lindaniclasticum is a Gram-negative, aerobic, rod-shaped, non-spore-forming and non-motile bacterium from the genus Novosphingobium which has been isolated from a hexachlorocyclohexane dumpsite in Lucknow in India. Novosphingobium lindaniclasticum has the ability to degrade hexachlorocyclohexane.
