= Novosphingobium nitrogenifigens =

Scientific classification
- Domain: Bacteria
- Kingdom: Pseudomonadati
- Phylum: Pseudomonadota
- Class: Alphaproteobacteria
- Order: Sphingomonadales
- Family: Sphingomonadaceae
- Genus: Novosphingobium
- Species: N. nitrogenifigens

Binomial name
- Novosphingobium nitrogenifigens Addison et al. 2007

Type strain
- DSM 19370, ICMP 16470, Y88

Species of bacterium

Novosphingobium nitrogenifigens is a Gram-negative, diazotroph and rod-shaped bacterium from the genus Novosphingobium which has been isolated from pulp and paper wastewater in New Zealand.
