= Novosphingobium taihuense =

Scientific classification
- Domain: Bacteria
- Kingdom: Pseudomonadati
- Phylum: Pseudomonadota
- Class: Alphaproteobacteria
- Order: Sphingomonadales
- Family: Sphingomonadaceae
- Genus: Novosphingobium
- Species: N. taihuense

Binomial name
- Novosphingobium taihuense Liu et al. 2005

Type strain
- AS 1.3432, JCM 12465, T3-B9

Species of bacterium

Novosphingobium taihuense is a bacterium from the genus Novosphingobium which has been isolated from lake sediments from the Taihu Lake in China. Novosphingobium taihuense has the ability to degrade phenol, aniline, nitrobenzene, 4-chloronitrobenzene and phenanthrene.
