= Novosphingobium barchaimii =

Scientific classification
- Domain: Bacteria
- Kingdom: Pseudomonadati
- Phylum: Pseudomonadota
- Class: Alphaproteobacteria
- Order: Sphingomonadales
- Family: Sphingomonadaceae
- Genus: Novosphingobium
- Species: N. barchaimii

Binomial name
- Novosphingobium barchaimii Niharika et al. 2013

Type strain
- CCM 7980, DSM 25411, LL02

Species of bacterium

Novosphingobium barchaimii is a bacterium from the genus Novosphingobium which has been isolated from soil which was contaminated with hexachlorocyclohexane from the Spolana Neratovice plant in the Czech Republic.
