= Novosphingobium naphthalenivorans =

Scientific classification
- Domain: Bacteria
- Kingdom: Pseudomonadati
- Phylum: Pseudomonadota
- Class: Alphaproteobacteria
- Order: Sphingomonadales
- Family: Sphingomonadaceae
- Genus: Novosphingobium
- Species: N. naphthalenivorans

Binomial name
- Novosphingobium naphthalenivorans Suzuki and Hiraishi 2008

Type strain
- DSM 18518, JCM 13951, NBRC 102051, TUT562

Species of bacterium

Novosphingobium naphthalenivorans is a Gram-negative and strictly aerobic bacterium from the genus Novosphingobium which has been isolated from soil which was contaminated with polychlorinated-dioxin in Japan. Novosphingobium naphthalenivorans has the ability to degrade naphthalene.
