= Novosphingobium arabidopsis =

Scientific classification
- Domain: Bacteria
- Kingdom: Pseudomonadati
- Phylum: Pseudomonadota
- Class: Alphaproteobacteria
- Order: Sphingomonadales
- Family: Sphingomonadaceae
- Genus: Novosphingobium
- Species: N. arabidopsis

Binomial name
- Novosphingobium arabidopsis Lin et al. 2014

Type strain
- BCRC 80571, JCM 18896, CC-ALB-2

Species of bacterium

Novosphingobium arabidopsis is a Gram-negative, rod-shaped and aerobic bacterium from the genus Novosphingobium which has been isolated from the rhizosphere of the plant Arabidopsis thaliana. Novosphingobium arabidopsis is resistant against dichlorodiphenyltrichloroethane (DDT).
