= Ruthenbach (Ems) =

River in Germany

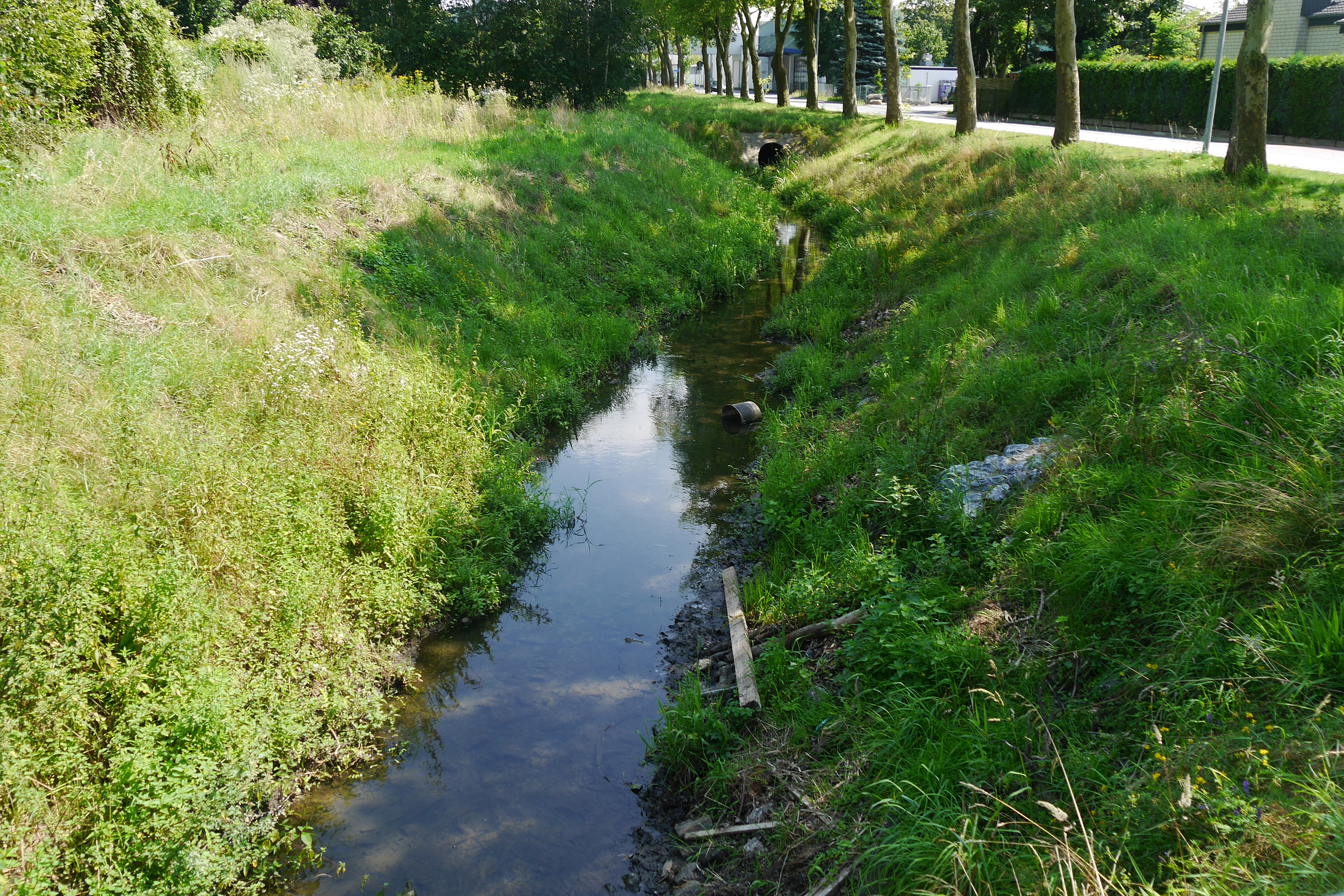

Location
- Country: Germany
- States: North Rhine-Westphalia

Physical characteristics
- Source
  - coordinates: 51°52′00″N 8°16′20″E
- Mouth
  - location: Ems
  - coordinates: 51.9362°N 8.2432°E

Basin features
- Progression: Ems→ North Sea

Ruthenbach is a river of North Rhine-Westphalia, Germany. It is 9.2 km (5.7 mi) long and a left tributary of the Ems south of Harsewinkel.

It should not be confused with the Ruthebach, a tributary of the Loddenbach, which is also officially referred to as Ruthenbach.

== See also ==
- List of rivers of North Rhine-Westphalia
