= RHS Garden Harlow Carr =

Public garden in North Yorkshire, England

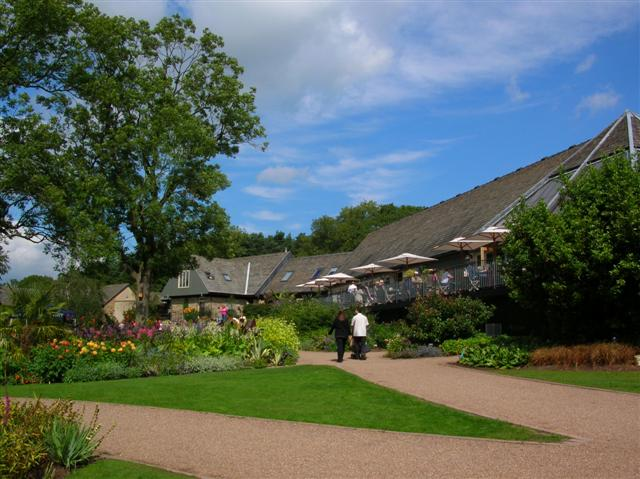
- The entrance to Harlow Carr Gardens

- Location within North Yorkshire
- Type: Garden
- Location: Crag Lane, Harrogate, North Yorkshire, England
- OS grid: SE2754
- Coordinates: 53°58′56″N 1°34′21″W
- Area: 23.4 hectares (58 acres)
- Created: 1946
- Founder: Northern Horticultural Society
- Operator: Royal Horticultural Society
- Visitors: 527,274 (2025)

RHS Garden Harlow Carr is one of five public gardens run by the Royal Horticultural Society. It is located on the western edge of Harrogate in the English county of North Yorkshire.

The RHS acquired Harlow Carr through its merger with the Northern Horticultural Society in 2001. It had been the Northern Horticultural Society's trial ground and display garden since they bought it in 1946.

== History ==
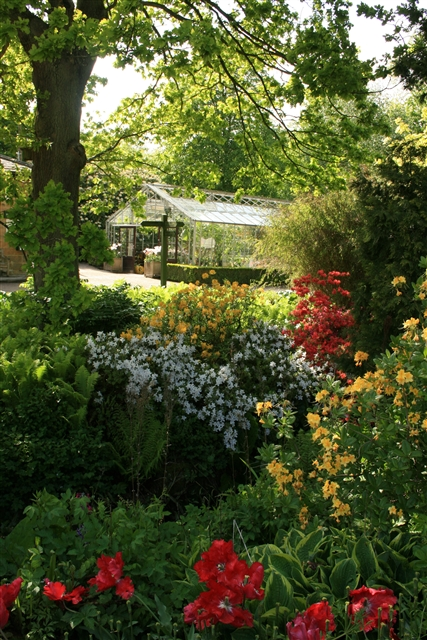
Harlow Carr gardens

Springs of sulphur water were discovered on the site in the 18th century but development of the site as a spa did not take place for over a hundred years. In 1840, the owner of the estate, Henry Wright, cleaned out and protected one of the wells and four years later built a hotel and a bath house. People were charged two shillings and six pence (nominally 12 1/2 p but about £11.00 at current prices) to bathe in the warm waters. The gardens were laid out around the bath house and in 1861 the site at Harlow Carr springs was described as:

a sweet secluded spot ... the grounds neatly laid out, adorned with a selection of trees, shrubs, flowers, walks, easy seats and shady arbours.

The hotel later became the Harrogate Arms.

The Northern Horticultural Society was founded in 1946 with the objective of:

promoting and developing the science, art and practice of horticulture with special reference to the conditions pertaining to the North of England.

The society leased 10.5 hectares (26 acres) of mixed woodland, pasture and arable land at Harlow Hill from the Harrogate Corporation and it opened the Harlow Carr Botanical Gardens in 1950. The chief aim of the venture was to set up a trial ground where the suitability of plants for growing in northern climates could be assessed. The original area has been extended to 23.4 ha (58 acres).

The bath house was converted in 1958 to contain the library and study centre. More recently it has been used as an exhibition space for arts and crafts. The six well heads in front of the bath house have been capped off but remain beneath the present Limestone Rock Garden. At times there is a smell of sulphur in this area.

A new learning centre was built in 2010 containing classrooms for school visits and adult learning courses, and the library. The latter holds a range of gardening-related books, periodicals and DVDs which can be loaned to RHS members and accessed by any garden visitor.

In 2014 the Harrogate Arms and the land surrounding it were acquired by the RHS with plans progressing to restore the building, create new gardens around it and reintroduce its links with the old bath house. The former hotel re-opened in 2024.

In 2021 the new Thaliana Bridge was installed across the Queen Mother's Lake with the design representing the sequence of an Arabidopsis thaliana chromosome. This was inspired by the work of the botanical scientist Rachel Leech.

Geoffrey Smith, writer and broadcaster, was Superintendent of Harlow Carr from 1954 to 1974.

== Location ==
The garden is situated on Crag Lane, off Otley Road (B6162) about a mile and a half from the centre of Harrogate.

== Features ==
=== Old Bath House ===
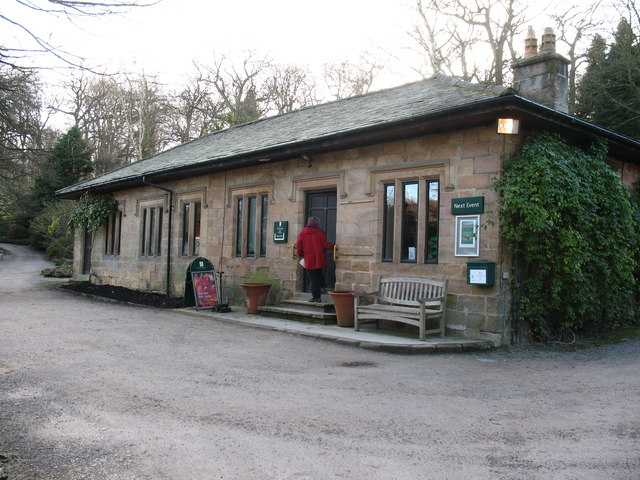
The Old Bath House

The Old Bath House was built in 1844 as the Harlow Carr Sulphur Spa. The spa closed in 1922 and the building was converted into offices for the Northern Horticultural Society. More recently, it has been used as an exhibition and events space for the gardens. The building is built of gritstone with projecting eaves and a hipped slate roof. It has one storey and six bays. The outer bays contain doorways, and in the inner bays are recessed windows with chamfered surrounds, two or three lights and hood moulds. It is a grade II listed building.

=== Harrogate Arms ===
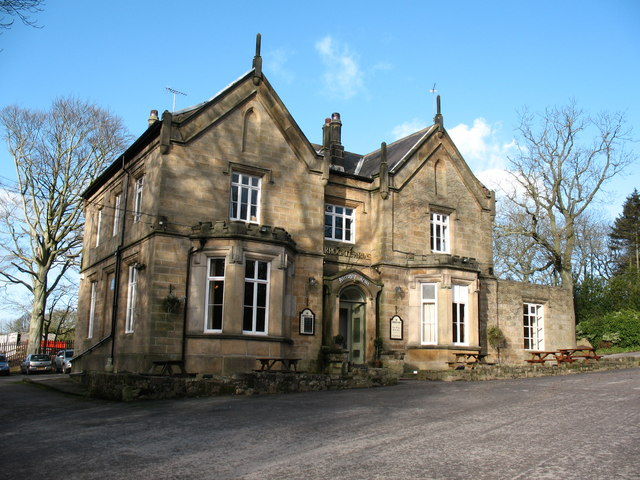
The Harrogate Arms

The Harrogate Arms was built in about 1844, as a hotel for visitors to the spa, with ten bedrooms. It became the Crag Bar in the 1970s, and later a Thai restaurant, but was then disused for more than a decade. It was purchased by the RHS, and converted into a cafe, which opened in 2024. It is constructed of gritstone, with string courses, and a slate roof with coped gables and finials. It has two storeys and three bays, the outer bays projecting and gabled. In the centre is a gabled porch, and an arched doorway with a fanlight and a hood mould. The outer bays contain splayed bay windows with embattled parapets. In the upper floor are recessed mullioned and transomed windows with chamfered surrounds and hood moulds, containing casements, and in the gables are blind lancets. It is grade II listed.

=== Other features ===
Harlow Carr has:

- Winter Walk
- Kitchen Garden
- Gardens through Time
- The Queen Mother’s Lake
- Woodland
- Streamside
- Wildflower meadow and bird hide
- Arboretum
- Humus-rich terraces
- Winter Garden
- Scented Garden
- Foliage Garden
- Annual and perennial displays
- Ornamental Grasses border
- Alpine House
- Learning Centre
- Library

It also has a shop, plant centre and Bettys Cafe Tea Rooms.
