= Sexual selection in Arabidopsis thaliana =

Mode of natural selection in plants

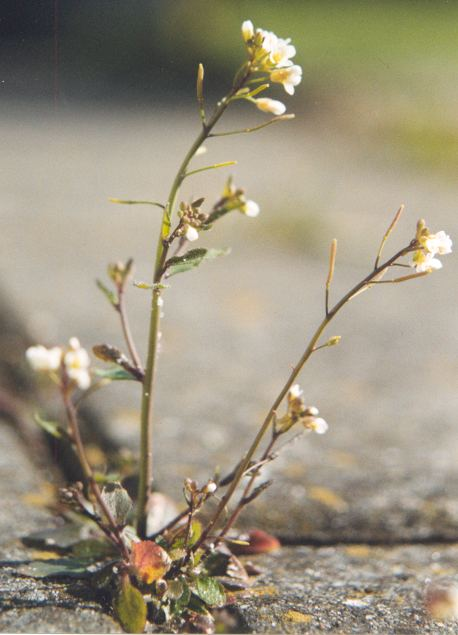
Arabidopsis thaliana

Sexual selection in Arabidopsis thaliana is a mode of natural selection by which the flowering plant Arabidopsis thaliana selects mates to maximize reproductive success.

Arabidopsis thaliana is a small flowering land plant in the family Brassicaceae, which is utilized as a model organism for genetic studies. While the plant's genomics are well understood, little is known about sexual selection processes and sex-biased genes in this species. It has been found that these genes associate with the sexually dimorphic traits of males and females, considering that both sexes of a species will have very similar genomes. These genes are preferentially expressed in the different sexes within a species, and tend to provide an accelerated rate of evolution resulting from a specific sex expressing the optimum phenotype to maximize fitness. A. thaliana is a self-fertilizing plant without sex chromosomes that is capable of utilizing sex-biased genes to potentially aid in adaptive evolution. There is little knowledge on how sex-biased genes function in A. thaliana's genome.

== Arabidopsis thaliana ==
A. thaliana was discovered in the Harz Mountains in the 1500s with a native range that stretches on rough terrain across Eurasia, but has also established in North America as well. A. thaliana was identified as a model organism for genomic studies due to its small genome, consisting of only 5 chromosomes. A. thaliana has a relatively short life cycle, only taking approximately 5 weeks to reach full maturity after germination. This short life cycle makes it an ideal candidate as a model organism for genomic studies.

== Sex-biased genes ==
Sex-biased genes are genes with expression exclusive to one sex and provide a potential means of rapid evolution in a species.

=== Variation between sexes ===
Male and female sex-biased genes of A. thaliana have major differences in expression and function. Male genes expressed in the pollen tube regions of the plant struggle in the initiation of protein evolution. This is the result of newly developed mutations being acted upon by positive selection. Female gametophytes differ significantly in their utilized number of sexually expressed genes compared to males. When looking at both types of gametophytes, both males and females shared approximately 20 genes that are expressed in similar fashion. It has also been found that 925 genes in A. thaliana are associated with the male gametophyte, consisting of those linked to sperm cells, pollen, and pollen tubes. On the other hand, approximately 196 genes have been identified to associate with the female gametophyte.

=== Function ===
The genes identified in the tissues of A. thaliana were able to be separated out and categorized based on location and function for both male and female reproductive organs. The male reproductive organs of the plant are much easier to be utilized for experimental procedures due to their capability to be easily isolated from the plant compared to the female organs. The genes that have been linked to pollen and pollen production show strong co-expression due to their classification as duplicated genes across various tissues. It has been identified that genes associated with pollen and the pollen tubes have a relatively high number of expressed polymorphisms through purifying selection. Identifiable features of adaptive evolution expressed in pollen associated genes are comparable to the increased levels of adaptive evolution in other comparable species. With adaptation regulated by mutation rates, the sex-biased genes associated with the male organs of the plant could show higher adaptation rates due to their presence being in a haploid state. In this haploid state, mutations are directly exposed to the opportunity of rapid selection. Pollen interactions associated with sporophytic tissue are not expressed in genes linked to female reproductive organs. The mechanisms involved in pollen formation and development of the pollen tube are important for pollen selection as well as protein composition of the pollen. Pollen surface proteins are produced in the sporophytic tissue of the anther and have expressed higher levels of purified selection with an increase in adaptive evolution from the oleopollenins of the anther.

== Pollination mechanisms ==
A. thaliana is a self-pollinating plant compared to other closely related species, meaning it does not require pollen from other plants for fertilization. Self-pollination provides an effective means for plants to colonize new habitats effectively because they do not rely on pollen from another member of their species. By carrying both male and female reproductive organs, the effort for sexual reproduction is greatly diminished but comes at a cost.

=== Reduction of self-pollination ===
The implementation of self-pollination significantly reduces genetic variation in a population, and an established population of identical progeny presents limited opportunity for evolution on a genomic level throughout a species. The plant combats this through the utilization of both male and female sex organs which provides an environment with low rates of outcrossing through sex-biased genes. The result of low genetic variations in both A. thaliana gametophytes self-fertilization comes from the low rates of outcrossing. The low rates of outcrossing can be overcome by variations of heterogeneity in selection. This can happen based on the rare occurrence of outcrossing, which in A. thaliana, only occurs in the wild about 1% of the time. It has been found that rare occurrences of outcrossing can be as high as 15% in a given population. Researchers believe that even the 1% of occurrence is high enough of a rate to initiate genetic consistencies that can associate with sexual selection in A. thaliana.

=== Pollen competition ===
The presence of pollen competition when outcrossing occurs in a plant that utilizes self-fertilization allows recognition and selection of different pollen grains to fertilize the ovule. A. thaliana is closely related to Arabidopsis lyrata being that one diverged from the other through speciation. Although speciation has separated these species, they are still capable of providing a means of outcrossing between each other, initiating pollen competition within the plant. Although competition does occur among male gametophytes of both species, A. lyrata has very low instances of adaptive evolution compared to A. thaliana. This evidence is usually not the case in the instance of pollen competition across similar species, which generally results in increased rates of outcrossing. When outcrossing occurs generally there are much higher rates of genetic variation in progeny. There is little data on A. lyrata which results in little knowledge of whole genome polymorphisms.

== Pollen associated gene interaction ==
It was determined that interactions associated between sporophytic tissue and pollen is exclusively expressed in the male gene sets. Therefore, the evidence suggests the importance of these interactions for understanding pollen selection by the plant. Other potential factors that play a role in pollen selection could be secreted pollen proteins, as well as protein composition. With major identified differences of pollen associated genes compared to other reproductive tissues, they can potentially be the underlying mechanisms correlated with sexual selection occurring during the prezygotic stage of pollination. This underlies the correlation between how selective pressure through the interactions between pollen grains as well as pollen tube formation provide an example of established sexual selection. A. thaliana provides an effective means to understand how even organisms that may appear limited in genetic variation based on reproductive strategies can still maintain a means of evolution through sex-biased genes and sexual selection through outcrossing.
