= Novosphingobium panipatense =

Scientific classification
- Domain: Bacteria
- Kingdom: Pseudomonadati
- Phylum: Pseudomonadota
- Class: Alphaproteobacteria
- Order: Sphingomonadales
- Family: Sphingomonadaceae
- Genus: Novosphingobium
- Species: N. panipatense

Binomial name
- Novosphingobium panipatense Gupta et al. 2009

Type strain
- CCM 7472, MTCC 9019, SM16

Synonyms
- Novosphingobium panipatensis

Species of bacterium

Novosphingobium panipatense is a Gram-negative and halophilic bacterium from the genus Novosphingobium which has been isolated from oil-contaminated soil in Panipat in India.
