= Novosphingobium kunmingense =

Scientific classification
- Domain: Bacteria
- Kingdom: Pseudomonadati
- Phylum: Pseudomonadota
- Class: Alphaproteobacteria
- Order: Sphingomonadales
- Family: Sphingomonadaceae
- Genus: Novosphingobium
- Species: N. kunmingense

Binomial name
- Novosphingobium kunmingense Xie et al. 2014

Type strain
- CGMCC 1.12274, DSM 25975, 18-11HK

Species of bacterium

Novosphingobium kunmingense is a Gram-negative, strictly aerobic and rod-shaped bacterium from the genus Novosphingobium which has been isolated from a phosphate mine in Kunming in China.
