= Rachel Leech =

British plant scientist (1936–2017)

Rachel M. Leech
- Born: 3 June 1936
- Died: 23 December 2017 (aged 81)
- Education: University of Oxford
- Known for: Chloroplast development
- Scientific career
- Workplaces: Imperial College, London; University of York, England
- Doctoral advisor: W O James

Rachel Leech (3 June 1936 – 23 December 2017) was Professor of Plant Sciences at the University of York, England. Her research focused on chloroplasts and she was a leader in the field of understanding their development and function. She was also one of the early adopters of Arabidopsis thaliana as a model plant to identify the genes involved in chloroplast division.

== Education and personal life ==
Rachel Mary Leech's family was from Otley; she was born on 3 June 1936. Her mother was Frances Mary Ruth Leech (née Cowley). Her father, Alfred Jack Leech, was a schoolteacher of English. She attended the school where he taught, Prince Henry’s Grammar School. She studied at St Hilda's College at the University of Oxford. During her PhD she worked on the cytochromes from barley chloroplasts, and this interest in chloroplasts continued for the rest of her life. She was awarded a first class B. Sc. degree in Botany in 1957. Immediately before being awarded her doctorate in 1961, she spent 1959 - 60 at the Zoological Station in Naples supported by the Christopher Welch Scholarship from Oxford. This visit to Italy gave her a life-long love of the country. Her PhD supervisor moved from University of Oxford to Imperial College, London and she moved as well, to graduate with PhD from Imperial College.

She died on 23 December 2017.

== Career ==
Her career involved pioneering work on chloroplasts, the plant organelles that undertake photosynthesis. She initially used various grass species and broad beans (Vicia faba) as sources of chloroplasts. Her early work provided a method to isolate intact chloroplasts, which were needed to study how photosynthesis was co-ordinated, especially its essential requirement of transport of materials and electrons across a membrane. Her focus became the development of chloroplasts and their interactions with other cellular components. She adopted new technologies as they became available. As the application of genetics to plant development advanced, she began to work with Arabidopsis thaliana and through the use of mutants identified several proteins involved in chloroplast development.

By 1959 she had her first academic appointment, as a lecturer in botany and plant technology at Imperial College, London. She first worked on centrifugation methods to separate chloroplasts efficiently from mitochondria, another cell organelle. She initially showed that the current accepted method for chloroplast isolation resulted in significant contamination with mitochondria.

By 1963 she and colleagues had made among the first systematic studies of osmiophilic globules that had been seen in chloroplasts using microscopes. This showed they were distinct from chloroplasts, rather than caused by damage, and also that they were composed mainly of lipids. This work continues to be cited in the twenty-first century, along with her subsequent work on the lipid composition of chloroplast membranes. In 1964 Leech published a method for isolating structurally intact chloroplasts free of other cell materials. This was an important step forwards in studying chloroplasts, especially their interactions with the rest of the cell and became the method used by many other research groups.

In 1964 she was recruited to the new Department of Biology, University of York, but did not move there until 1966. She was again appointed as a lecturer but was promoted to senior lecturer in 1969 and to reader in 1975. She was promoted to Professor of Plant Sciences in 1978 and remained at University of York until she retired in 1998. She was a Leverhulme Emeritus Fellow from 2001 until 2002.

Utilising the technical advances she had made, her research began to focus around the development of chloroplasts where the careful work of Leech and her collaborators again continued to be of importance into the twenty-first century. They also explored the genome of the chloroplast in increasing detail. By the late 1980s Leech's research had begun to use Arabidopsis thaliana that was being adopted as a model plant across the scientific community. She was able to make use of the isolation of mutants to identify several proteins required for chloroplast development.

== Publications ==
Leech was the author or co-author of over 95 scientific publications. These included:

- Joanne L. Marrison, Stephen M. Rutherford, Elizabeth J. Robertson, Clare Lister, Caroline Dean and Rachel M. Leech (1999) The distinctive roles of five different ARC genes in the chloroplast division process in Arabidopsis. The Plant Journal 18 651-662
- Kevin A. Pyke and Rachel M. Leech Chloroplast Division and Expansion Is Radically Altered by Nuclear Mutations in Arabidopsis thaliana. (1992) Plant Physiology 99 1005-1008
- RO Mackender and RM Leech (1974)
- RM Leech (1964) Isolation of structurally intact chloroplasts. Biochimica et Biophysica Acta 79 637-6
- AD Greenwood, RM Leech and JP Williams (1963) The osmiophilic globules of chloroplasts: I. Osmiophilic globules as a normal component of chloroplasts and their isolation and composition in Vicia faba L. Biochimica et Biophysica Acta 78 148-162

== Legacy ==
In 2021 the Thaliana Bridge was installed at the RHS Garden Harlow Carr with the design inspired by Leech's role in introducing the use of Arabidopsis thaliana as a model plant that led to it becoming the first plant to have its genome sequenced entirely.
