= Novosphingobium lentum =

Scientific classification
- Domain: Bacteria
- Kingdom: Pseudomonadati
- Phylum: Pseudomonadota
- Class: Alphaproteobacteria
- Order: Sphingomonadales
- Family: Sphingomonadaceae
- Genus: Novosphingobium
- Species: N. lentum

Binomial name
- Novosphingobium lentum Tiirola et al. 2005

Type strain
- CCUG 45847, CIP 108698, DSM 13663, NBRC 107847, MT1

Species of bacterium

Novosphingobium lentum is a Gram-negative, rod-shaped, non-spore-forming, psychrotolerant and non-motile bacterium from the genus Novosphingobium which has been isolated from chlorophenol-contaminated groundwater in Finland. Novosphingobium lentum has the ability to degrade chlorophenol.
