= Novosphingobium aquiterrae =

Scientific classification
- Domain: Bacteria
- Kingdom: Pseudomonadati
- Phylum: Pseudomonadota
- Class: Alphaproteobacteria
- Order: Sphingomonadales
- Family: Sphingomonadaceae
- Genus: Novosphingobium
- Species: N. aquiterrae

Binomial name
- Novosphingobium aquiterrae Lee et al. 2014

Type strain
- KACC 17599, NBRC 109812, NCAIM B 02537, E-II-3, IMER-B1-18

Species of bacterium

Novosphingobium aquiterrae is a Gram-negative, rod-shaped, strictly aerobic, non-spore-forming and non-motile bacterium from the genus Novosphingobium which has been isolated from ground water from Daejeon in Korea.
