= Novosphingobium mathurense =

Scientific classification
- Domain: Bacteria
- Kingdom: Pseudomonadati
- Phylum: Pseudomonadota
- Class: Alphaproteobacteria
- Order: Sphingomonadales
- Family: Sphingomonadaceae
- Genus: Novosphingobium
- Species: N. mathurense

Binomial name
- Novosphingobium mathurense Gupta et al. 2009

Type strain
- CCM 7473, MTCC 9020, SM11, SM117

Synonyms
- Novosphingobium mathurensis

Species of bacterium

Novosphingobium mathurense is a Gram-negative and halophilic bacterium from the genus Novosphingobium which has been isolated from oil-contaminated soil in Mathura in India.
