= BZIP intron animal =

Consensus secondary structure and sequence conservation of bZIP intron in animals

The bZIP intron animal is an unconventional bZIP intron in animals located in the mRNA of Xbp1 orthologs. The RNA structure consists of two hairpins of similar length with loop regions defining the splice sites. Intron is usually 23 or 26 nt long and it is excised by endoribonuclease Ire1 encoded by ERN1 gene in response to ER stress. Splicing of this intron causes a frameshift in Xbp1 mRNA that introduces a new C-terminal transactivation domain, producing the active spliced transcription factor. The splicing mechanism in this group was first reported in human.
