= Novosphingobium fuchskuhlense =

Scientific classification
- Domain: Bacteria
- Kingdom: Pseudomonadati
- Phylum: Pseudomonadota
- Class: Alphaproteobacteria
- Order: Sphingomonadales
- Family: Sphingomonadaceae
- Genus: Novosphingobium
- Species: N. fuchskuhlense

Binomial name
- Novosphingobium fuchskuhlense Glaeser et al. 2013

Type strain
- CCM 7978, CCUG 61508, DSM 25065, FNE08-7

Species of bacterium

Novosphingobium fuchskuhlense is a Gram-negative and rod-shaped bacterium from the genus Novosphingobium which has been isolated from the lake Grosse Fuchskuhle in Brandenburg in Germany.
