= Chloroacetamide =

- Structural formula

Names
- Preferred IUPAC name 2-Chloroacetamide

Identifiers
CAS Number	79-07-2
3D model (JSmol)	Interactive image
ChEBI	CHEBI:234507
ChemSpider	6332
ECHA InfoCard	100.001.068
EC Number	201-174-2
PubChem CID	6580
UNII	2R97846T1L
CompTox Dashboard (EPA)	DTXSID9041570
- InChI: InChI=1S/C2H4ClNO/c3-1-2(4)5/h1H2,(H2,4,5) Key: VXIVSQZSERGHQP-UHFFFAOYSA-N; InChI=1S/C2H4ClNO/c3-1-2(4)5/h1H2,(H2,4,5) Key: VXIVSQZSERGHQP-UHFFFAOYAM
- SMILES: ClCC(=O)N

Properties
Chemical formula	C_{2}H_{4}ClNO
Molar mass	93.51 g·mol^{−1}
Appearance	Colorless crystals or white fine powder (yellow if impure)
Odor	Characteristic
Density	1.58 g/cm^{3} at 20 °C
Melting point	120 °C (248 °F; 393 K)
Solubility in water	52.5 g/l at 20 °C; 90 g/L at 25 °C
Vapor pressure	0.07 hPa at 20 °C

Hazards
- Occupational safety and health (OHS/OSH)
Main hazards	Very toxic. It is suspected of reproductive toxicity and teratogenicity.
Ingestion hazards	Very toxic
Inhalation hazards	Very toxic
Eye hazards	Irritation
Skin hazards	Irritation
- GHS labelling
Pictograms	(GHS06: Toxic) (GHS08: Health hazard)
Signal word	Danger
Hazard statements	H301, H317, H361, H402
Precautionary statements	P201, P202, P261, P264, P270, P272, P273, P280, P301+P310+P330, P302+P352, P308+P313, P333+P313, P405, P501
Flash point	170 °C (338 °F; 443 K)
- Lethal dose or concentration (LD, LC)
LD_{50} (median dose)	138 mg/kg (oral, rat) >2000 mg/kg (skin, rat)
LC_{50} (median concentration)	19.8 mg/l, 96 h (Carassius auratus (goldfish))
- Safety data sheet (SDS)

Related compounds
Related compounds	Fluoroacetamide; Bromoacetamide; Iodoacetamide; Chloroacetic acid; Acetamide; Dichloroacetamide; N-Chlorosuccinimide
- Except where otherwise noted, data are given for materials in their standard state (at 25 °C [77 °F], 100 kPa). Infobox references

Chloroacetamide (2-chloroacetamide) is a chlorinated organic compound with the molecular formula ClCH_{2}CONH_{2}. It is a colorless solid although older samples appear yellow. It has a characteristic odor and is readily soluble in water. It has the structure Cl−CH_{2}−C(=O)−NH_{2}.

== Production ==
Chloroacetamide is produced by ammonolysis of esters of chloroacetic acid:

ClCH_{2}CO_{2}CH_{3} + NH_{3} → ClCH_{2}C(O)NH_{2} + CH_{3}OH

== Uses ==
Chloroacetamide has been used as an herbicide, preservative. and in the manufacturing of pharmaceuticals.

== Hazards ==
Chloroacetamide is toxic, irritates eyes and skin, and may cause an allergic reaction. It is suspected of reproductive toxicity and teratogenicity.

== See also ==
- Novosphingobium chloroacetimidivorans, a bacterium named after its ability to degrade chloroacetamide
