= Novosphingobium aromaticivorans =

Scientific classification
- Domain: Bacteria
- Kingdom: Pseudomonadati
- Phylum: Pseudomonadota
- Class: Alphaproteobacteria
- Order: Sphingomonadales
- Family: Sphingomonadaceae
- Genus: Novosphingobium
- Species: N. aromaticivorans

Binomial name
- Novosphingobium aromaticivorans corrig. (Balkwill et al. 1997) Takeuchi et al. 2001

Synonyms
- Novosphingobium aromaticivorum (Balkwill et al. 1997) Takeuchi et al. 2001; Sphingomonas aromaticivorans Balkwill et al. 1997

Species of bacterium

Novosphingobium aromaticivorans is a species of bacteria. It is an aromatic compound-degrading bacteria, it is gram-negative, non-spore-forming, non-motile and rod-shaped. It is found in deep-terrestrial-subsurface sediments.
