= HOTHEAD (gene) =

Arabidopsis thaliana gene

HOTHEAD is an Arabidopsis thaliana gene that encodes a flavin adenine dinucleotide-containing oxidoreductase. This gene has a role in the creation of the carpel during the formation of flowers through the fusion of epidermal cells. Observations of reversion of the hothead phenotype and genotype led to the suggestion that the plants were able to "remember" the sequences of genes present in their ancestors, possibly through a cache of complementary RNA. This report attracted broad attention, and alternative explanations were suggested. Later research suggested that the supposed reversion phenomenon was due to the plants having a pronounced bias towards outcrossing (because of their floral defects), rather than self-fertilizing at high rates, as is typical for A. thaliana.

== External links and further reading ==
- Recommendations of 2005 paper on F1000 (most rated paper in the history of the site): http://f1000.com/prime/1024824
- Post by Ogden (2013) describing a follow-up paper: http://blog.f1000research.com/2013/02/04/meddling-with-mendel/
- News piece by Gawrylewski (2008): http://www.the-scientist.com/?articles.view/articleNo/26000/title/Mendel-upended-/
- HOTHEAD locus page: https://www.arabidopsis.org/servlets/TairObject?type=locus&id=30300
