= Friedrich Laibach =

German botanist

Friedrich Joseph Laibach (April 2, 1885 – 5 June 1967) was a German botanist from Limburg-Weilburg.

== Life and work ==
Laibach was promoted in 1907 at the University of Bonn (with Eduard Strasburger). In 1919 he qualified as a professor at the University of Frankfurt (botany). After becoming a member of the National Socialists and his accession to the Nazi Party (National Socialist German Workers' Party (German: Nationalsozialistische Deutsche Arbeiterpartei, abbreviated NSDAP), he was ordained as director of the Botanical Institute at the Goethe University in Frankfurt from 1934 to 1945. From 1934 to 1936, he also took up university lectures at the University of Frankfurt. In 1945 he was released for political reasons. After the end of the Second World War he was head of the biological research institute Limburg from 1946. Laibach is the founder of experimental Arabidopsis research; the thale cress (Arabidopsis thaliana) is a perennial weed which Laibach investigated in his doctoral thesis on the chromosome sets of plants.
