= Ruthebach =

River in Germany

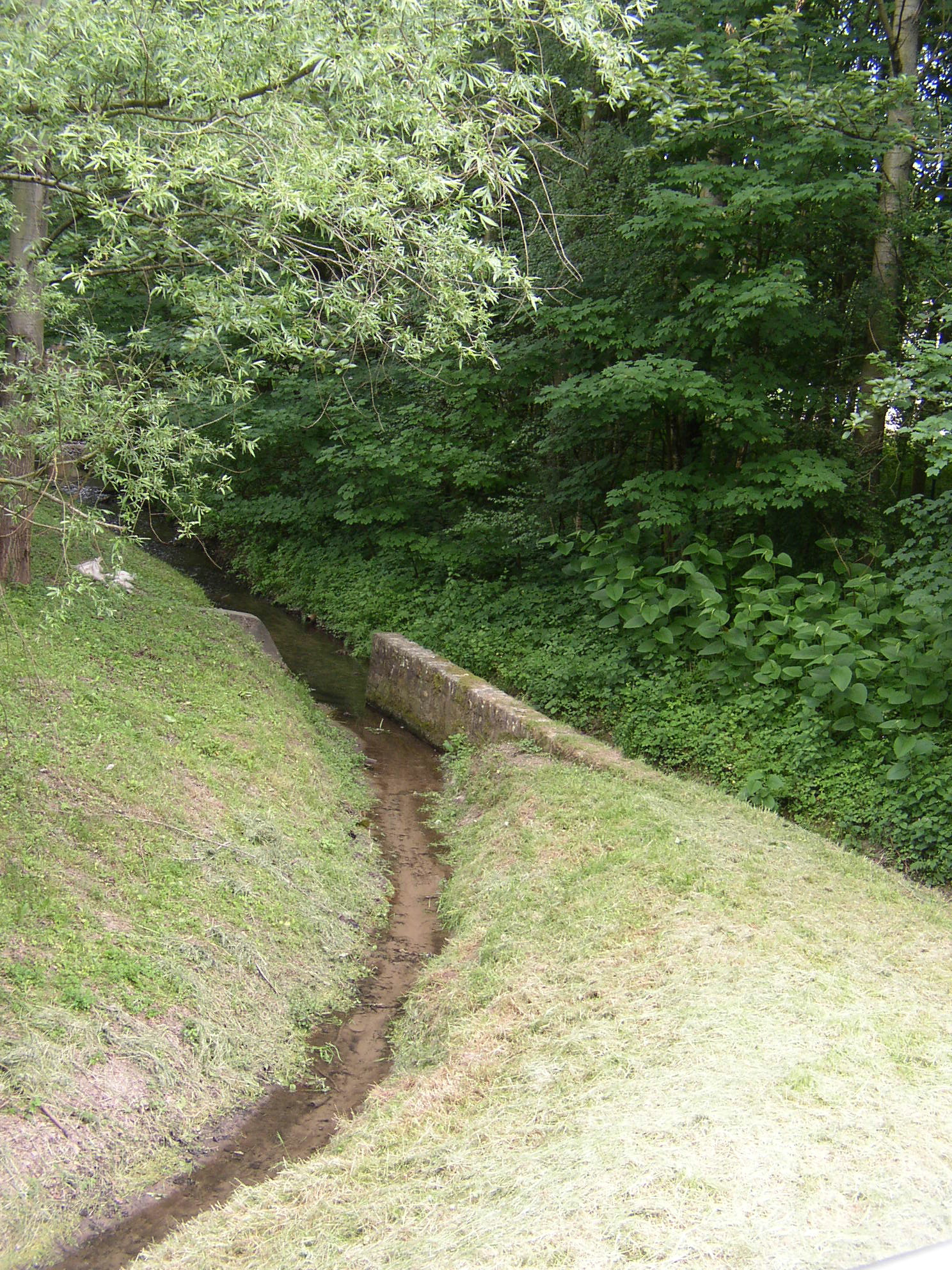

Location
- Country: Germany
- State: North Rhine-Westphalia

Physical characteristics
- Mouth
  - location: Loddenbach
  - coordinates: 52.0138°N 8.2444°E
- Length: 10.3 km (6.4 mi)

Basin features
- Progression: Loddenbach→ Ems→ North Sea

Ruthebach is a river of North Rhine-Westphalia, Germany. It is a left tributary of the Loddenbach north of Harsewinkel. It should not be confused with the Ruthenbach, a direct tributary of the Ems.

== See also ==
- List of rivers of North Rhine-Westphalia
