= Halo blight =

Bacterial plant disease

Halo blight of bean
- The black spots are necrotic spots or dead tissue due to the disease Pseudomonas syringae. The yellow halos surrounding the spots are chlorotic or yellowing tissue.
- Common names: bacterial blight of bean grease spot of bean
- Causal agents: Pseudomonas syringae pv. phaseolicola
- Hosts: bean
- EPPO Code: PSDMPH

Halo blight of bean is a bacterial disease caused by Pseudomonas syringae pv. phaseolicola. Halo blight’s pathogen is a gram-negative, aerobic, polar-flagellated and non-spore forming bacteria. This bacterial disease was first discovered in the early 1920s, and rapidly became the major disease of beans throughout the world. The disease favors the places where temperatures are moderate and plentiful inoculum is available.

== Classification ==
- Kingdom: Bacteria
- Phylum: Proteobacteria
- Class: Gamma Proteobacteria
- Order: Pseudomonadales
- Family: Pseudomonadaceae
- Genus: Pseudomonas
- Species: P. syringae

== Hosts and symptoms ==
Common beans in moderate temperature regions are victims of halo blights. Main hosts are lima beans, red kidney bean, cranberry yellow eye field beans, snap beans, scarlet runner, kudzu vine and common P.vulgaris. Halo blight is affected by environment factors and enter through plant injuries or natural openings. The development of the Halo blight is highly favored by cool temperature (such as 20–23 °C), unlike other common bacterial blights. In warm temperatures (over 24 °C), the production of phaseolotoxin decreases and symptoms become less obvious. Phaseolotoxin is a toxin produced by Halo blight pathogen which causes systemic chlorosis. Halo blight causes small water-soaked spots on leaves. These spot progressively turn dark brown and are surrounded by a wide greenish yellow halo. The necrotic spots remain small unlike that of common blight. Similar to foliage symptoms, halo blights causes water-soaked spots on vegetative pods. It also causes streaks along pod sutures. If lesions becomes severe on the pods, it may penetrate the pod walls or expand into the pod sutures which causes the seed to be wrinkled and discolored (yellow patches on the seed coat). Systemic infections are not common, but occur more favorably in some dry bean varieties. If the disease develops a systemic infection, it will cause curling, yellowing and death of young leaflets.

== Disease cycle ==
The seed is a source of inoculum and pathogen survives in seeds from the previous year. The pathogen of halo blight can overwinter in previously infected bean debris, contaminated seeds, weed hosts or volunteer beans. Halo blight can be dispersed by contact between wet leaves, rainfall, irrigation or people and animals moving through infested fields. The Pathogen can enter in either plant injuries or the natural openings in plants such as stomata and hydathodes during periods of high humidity or when the foliage is wet. Then the pathogen survives from defense mechanisms in intracellular spaces and obtain nutrients from the host. After 6–10 days of infection, bacteria oozes from lesions which causes secondary infections.

== Mode of action ==
Toxin phaseolotoxin is produced, which acts as an irreversible inhibitor of ornithine carbamyltransferase (OTC), an essential enzyme involved in the conversion from ornithine to arginine, an amino acid which is utilized in the biosynthesis of proteins in plants. With presence of 30 pmol phaseolotoxin, it is able to reduce OCT activity to less than 20% of the one of unaffected OCT within, leading to arginine starvation and subsequently prohibiting protein synthesis. As a result, disease symptoms appear within 2 days, where chlorotic lesions appear as yellow halos surrounding black necrotic spots on the infected plants.

== Environment ==
Halo blight seems to thrive when the temperatures are cooler. The optimal temperature for Pseudomonas Syringae to thrive is 20-23 °C. Moist environments also allow the spread of this disease. The pathogen enters the plant through wounds or stomata and hydathodes during periods of high relative humidity or free moisture. Above 28 °C, symptoms will usually not develop even though some water soaked spots may be present. Rain splash can allow the disease to spread, especially when there is a prevailing wind to allow the bacteria to transmit even farther. The presence of an organism such as a human or animal can also allow for the spread of the disease. Contact from the mammal to an infected plant cause the bacteria to be carried wherever the organism goes. The mammal can spread the disease to a whole new environment and introduce the pathogen to new hosts.

== Management ==
There are plenty of methods used to stop the spread of Halo blight. These methods include the use of foliar sprays, treatments of seeds, and resistant cultivars. Seeds that are sanitized from the previous year to show no bacterial signs can be planted without the worry of spreading the pathogen. Foliar sprays are the best ways to stop the secondary spread of Halo blight. Copper is the main component of the foliar sprays which are used to contain this pathogen. The Bordeaux mixture and streptomycin are two of the main foliar sprays that have shown results when treating Halo blight. Both of these sprays contain copper which is the most used element in anti-bacterial sprays. Resistance is a very important aspect to stopping the spread of Halo blight. The testing of field resistance has helped plant pathologists understand which cultivars can be helpful in defending against this disease. A resistant cultivar called Pse-2 had a high breeding value against multiple races of the pathogen. All of these actions can help eradicate this bacterial pathogen from spreading to more crop areas.

== Importance ==
Halo Blight is an important disease to beans, a money crop, which allow the pathogen Pseudomonas syringae to continue its lifespan. Beans are only one cash crop that can be affected by halo blight. Fields that are affected by this bacteria are at risk for the spread of it by way of rain, wind, or organisms but a widespread infection isn’t common with the cultural practices that are now used. In 1963-1967 there were many precautions taken and irrigation practices used but the effect of the environmental conditions caused epidemics in Idaho beans. The disease triangle illustrates this idea by emphasizing the importance of pathogen, host, and environment.

== Cure ==
As noted above, there are many procedures that can be used to manage an infection of Pseudomonas syringae but there is no cure and crop destruction is the usual procedure.
