= Loddenbach =

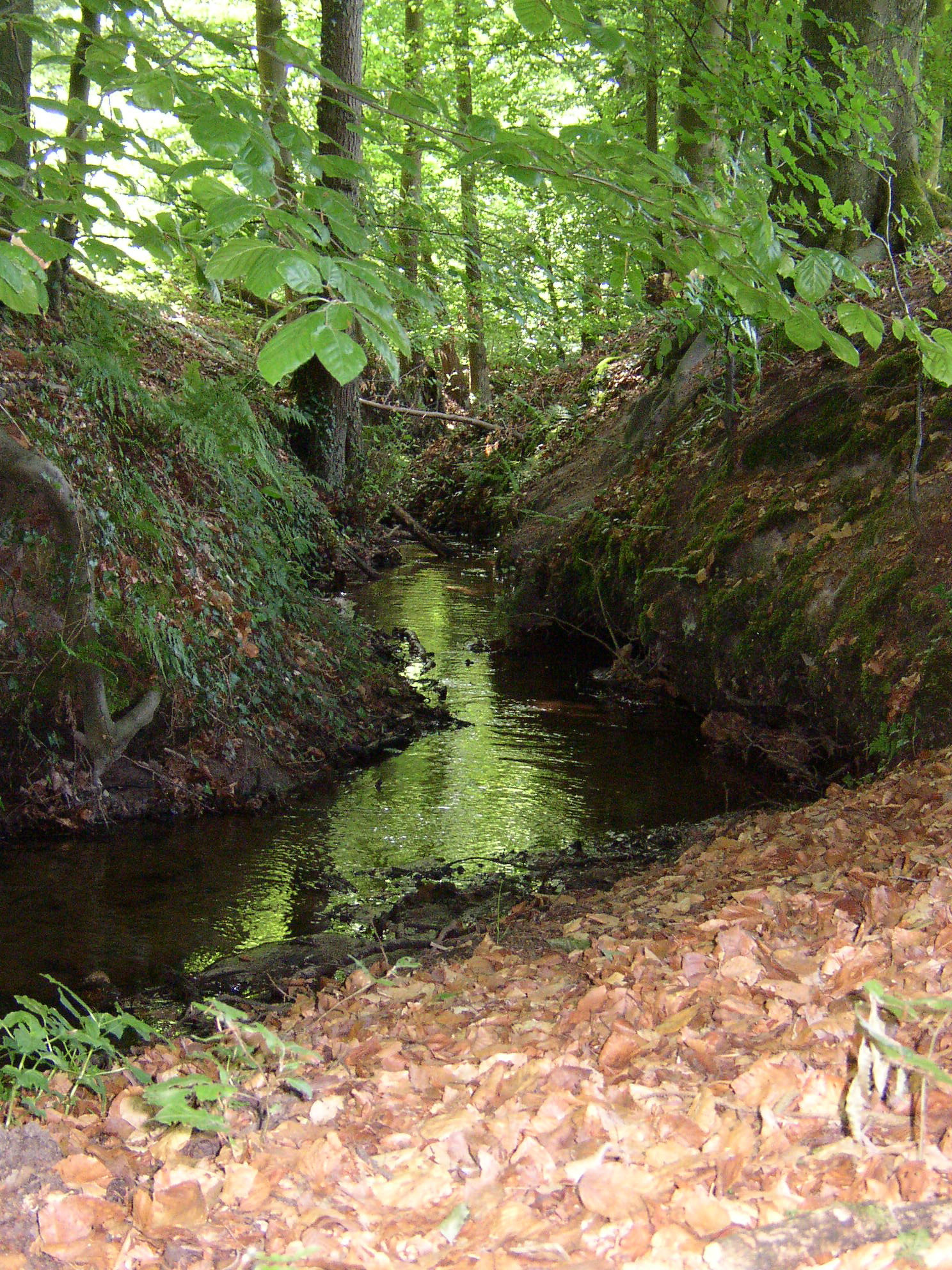

Location
- Country: Germany
- State: North Rhine-Westphalia

Physical characteristics
- Source
  - coordinates: 52°04′03″N 8°19′45″E
- Mouth
  - location: Ems
  - coordinates: 51.9687°N 8.1451°E
- Length: 20.4 km (12.7 mi)

Basin features
- Progression: Ems→ North Sea

Loddenbach is a river of North Rhine-Westphalia, Germany. It flows into the Ems near Harsewinkel.

== See also ==
- List of rivers of North Rhine-Westphalia
