= BZIP intron RNA motif =

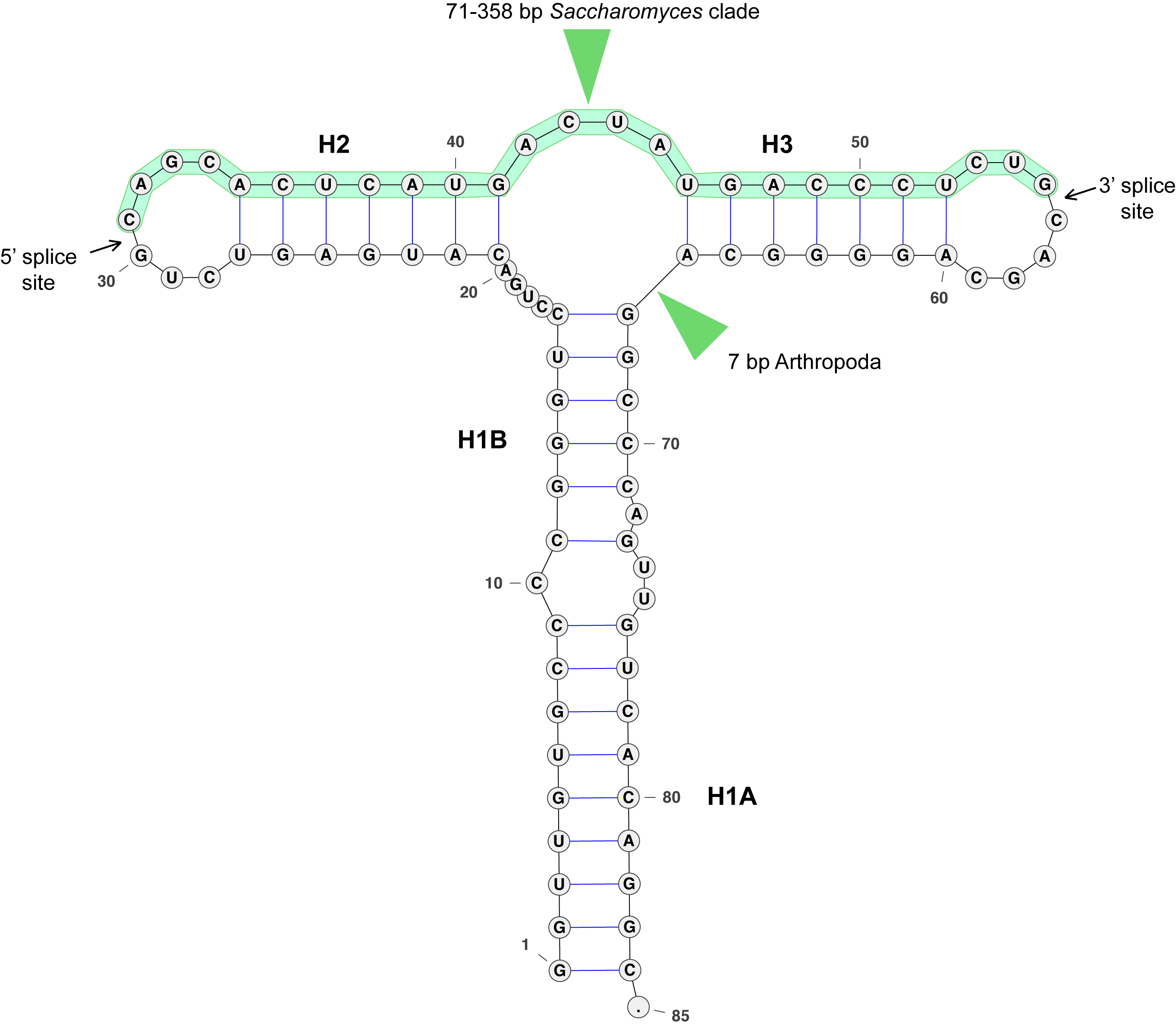
Consensus structure of bZIP mRNA around the unconventional intron

The bZIP intron RNA motif is an RNA structure guiding splicing of a non-canonical intron from bZIP-containing genes called HAC1 in yeast, XBP1 in Metazoa, Hxl1 or Cib1 in Basidiomycota and bZIP60 in plants. Splicing is performed independently of the spliceosome by Ire1, a kinase with endoribonuclease activity. Exons are joined by a tRNA ligase. Recognition of the intron splice sites is mediated by a base-paired secondary structure of the mRNA that forms at the exon/intron boundaries. Splicing of the bZIP intron is a key regulatory step in the unfolded protein response (UPR). The Ire-mediated unconventional splicing was first described for HAC1 in S. cerevisiae.

== Consensus structure ==
The secondary structure of the bZIP intron is very well conserved, and consists of two hairpins (H2 and H3) around the splice sites, and an extended hairpin (H1) that brings the splice sites together (see figure). The sequence of the intron is well conserved only around the splice sites. Non-canonical splicing motifs CNG'CNG in the loop region of H2 and H3 hairpins are conserved.

The consensus intron is very short in Metazoa (20, 23 or 26 nt). However, yeast species have a long (>100 nt) intron in HAC1. In Saccharomyces cerevisiae the long intron pairs with the 5′ UTR and stalls the ribosomes on the mRNA.

== Mechanism of splicing ==
Environmental stress can cause proteins to misfold and aggregate. To protect from these undesirable processes, a cell can activate the unfolded protein response (UPR) pathway. Splicing of the bZIP mRNA by Ire1 is one of the highly regulated ways of activating the UPR in response to presence of unfolded proteins in the endoplasmic reticulum (ER). ER stress activates the endoribonucleolytic activity of IRE1 proteins. IRE1 recognizes splice-site motifs in bZIP transcript and cleaves it. Stem-loop structures around the splice sites and IRE1-specific sequence motifs are both necessary and sufficient for splicing to occur. The joining of exons is performed by tRNA ligase (TRL1 in Saccharomyces cerevisiae).

== Intron conservation ==
Ire-mediated unconventional splicing of the bZIP intron has been confirmed experimentally in the following species:

- Yeast: S. cerevisiae, Candida albicans, Yarrowia lipolytica, Pichia pastoris, Candida parapsilosis
- Animals: human, mouse and Caenorhabditis elegans, fruit fly, honey bee, carp, whiteleg shrimp
- Other Fungi: Trichoderma reesei and Aspergillus nidulans, Neurospora crassa, Cryptococcus neoformans, Ustilago maydis
- Plants: Arabidopsis thaliana, maize.

Computational methods predict a bZIP intron with its characteristic RNA structure in 128 out of 156 species studied. In Fungi a bZIP intron was initially found only in Ascomycota (in 52 out of 63 species analysed) but experimental studies showed it is also present in Basidiomycota and other Candida species. All 45 vertebrate genomes analysed, 19 of Arthropoda, 7 of Nematoda, 2 of Annelida and 2 of Mollusca contain a characteristic HAC1-like structure in an open reading frame.
