= Alteripontixanthobacter muriae =

Scientific classification
- Domain: Bacteria
- Kingdom: Pseudomonadati
- Phylum: Pseudomonadota
- Class: Alphaproteobacteria
- Order: Sphingomonadales
- Family: Erythrobacteraceae
- Genus: Alteripontixanthobacter
- Species: A. muriae

Binomial name
- Alteripontixanthobacter muriae (Azpiazu-Muniozguren et al. 2021) Kim et al. 2021

Type strain
- JGD-16^{T}

Genus of bacterium

Alteripontixanthobacter muriae is a bacterium from the genus Alteripontixanthobacter. It was first discovered in muddy tidal flat sediments from Garorim Bay on Korea's west coast, where it forms bright yellow colonies. The bacterium is a small, non-moving, salt-tolerant organism that requires oxygen to survive and grows best in seawater conditions at around 30°C.

== Taxonomy ==
Altererythrobacter lutimaris belongs to the domain Bacteria, class Alphaproteobacteria, order Sphingomonadales, and family Erythrobacteraceae—a lineage recently expanded to 16 genera after genome-based re-evaluation of the group. The nearly complete 16S rRNA gene of the type strain JGD-16^{T} (1,431 bp) shows its closest affinity to A. xiamenensis (97.1% sequence identity) and several others in the genus, but all similarities fall below the 98.4% cut-off now accepted for delineating bacterial species. In the initial neighbour-joining tree, the strain clustered ambiguously among the genera Altererythrobacter, Parerythrobacter and Qipengyuania, reflecting the polyphyletic nature of the original genus definition.

To resolve that uncertainty the authors undertook a genome-wide phylogenomic analysis. Using single-copy core proteins and maximum likelihood methods, strain JGD-16^{T} formed a well-supported clade within the redefined genus Altererythrobacter, and average nucleotide and amino acid identity values to its nearest relatives remained below recommended genus-level thresholds, confirming its status as a novel species . The draft genome is 2.95 Mbp with a GC-content of 57.8 mol %—comfortably inside the 54.5–60.9 mol % range typical for the genus. On the basis of these molecular data, together with distinctive phenotypic and chemotaxonomic traits, the name Altererythrobacter lutimaris sp. nov. was validly published, with JGD-16^{T} (= KCTC 72632^{T} = KACC 21405^{T} = JCM 33750^{T}) designated as the type strain.

== Description ==
Altererythrobacter lutimaris is a small, yellow-pigmented member of the family Erythrobacteraceae that was first recovered from muddy tidal flat sediment at Janggu-do in Garorim Bay on Korea's west coast. The non-motile cells are Gram-negative (their wall does not retain the purple Gram stain), strictly aerobic, and short ovoid to coccoid bodies measuring roughly 0.5–0.7 μm by 0.7–0.9 μm. When grown on standard marine agar the bacterium forms smooth, circular, convex colonies 0.5–1.0 mm across that are a vivid butter-yellow; the species epithet, derived from Latin for "sea mud", reflects its habitat.

The strain grows between 10 °C and 37 °C (optimum 30 °C), at pH 6–9 (optimum pH 8), and in 1–5 % sea-salt with a preference for 2 %. Its membranes use the respiratory quinone ubiquinone-10 and are rich in the unsaturated fatty acid C18:1 ω7c (cis-vaccenic acid); together with minor amounts of C18:3 ω6c (γ-linolenic acid) these lipids suit life in saline coastal mud. Cells synthesise carotenoid pigments that absorb strongly at 450–477 nm, giving the colonies their bright colour, but they lack bacteriochlorophyll a and flexirubin pigments. Routine tests are catalase- and oxidase-positive and reveal aesculin hydrolysis and β-galactosidase activity, whereas fermentative use of glucose is absent.
