= Agromyces subbeticus =

Scientific classification
- Domain: Bacteria
- Kingdom: Bacillati
- Phylum: Actinomycetota
- Class: Actinomycetia
- Order: Micrococcales
- Family: Microbacteriaceae
- Genus: Agromyces
- Species: A. subbeticus

Binomial name
- Agromyces subbeticus Jurado et al. 2005

Type strain
- DSM 16689, HKI 0340, JCM 14324, NCIMB 14025, strain Z33

Species of bacterium

Agromyces subbeticus is a bacterium from the genus of Agromyces which has been isolated from cyanobacterial biofilm from the Cueva de los Murciélagos in Zuheros from Spain.
