= A. flavus =

A. flavus may refer to:

- Aspergillus flavus, a fungus species
- Altererythrobacter flavus a bacterial species from the genus of Altererythrobacter
- Agromyces flavus a bacterial species from the genus of Agromyces
- Arthrobacter flavus a bacterial species from the genus of Arthrobacter
- Awaous flavus a fish species found in South America

== See also ==
- Flavus (disambiguation)
