= Qipengyuania aquimaris =

Scientific classification
- Domain: Bacteria
- Kingdom: Pseudomonadati
- Phylum: Pseudomonadota
- Class: Alphaproteobacteria
- Order: Sphingomonadales
- Family: Erythrobacteraceae
- Genus: Qipengyuania
- Species: Q. aquimaris

Binomial name
- Qipengyuania aquimaris (Yoon et al. 2004) Xu et al. 2020

Type strain
- JCM 12189, KCCM 41818, SW-110

Synonyms
- Erythrobacter aquimaris Yoon et al. 2004

Species of bacterium

Qipengyuania aquimaris is a Gram-negative, non-spore-forming, slightly halophilic and non-motile bacteria from the genus Qipengyuania which has been isolated from the Yellow Sea in Korea.
