= P. dokdonensis =

P. dokdonensis may refer to:

- Phycicoccus dokdonensis, a Gram-positive bacterium.
- Porphyrobacter dokdonensis, a Gram-negative bacterium.
- Polaribacter dokdonensis, a Gram-negative bacterium of the genus Polaribacter.
- Pseudoxanthomonas dokdonensis, a Gram-negative bacterium of the genus Pseudoxanthomonas.
