= Pelagerythrobacter marensis =

Scientific classification
- Domain: Bacteria
- Kingdom: Pseudomonadati
- Phylum: Pseudomonadota
- Class: Alphaproteobacteria
- Order: Sphingomonadales
- Family: Erythrobacteraceae
- Genus: Pelagerythrobacter
- Species: P. marensis

Binomial name
- Pelagerythrobacter marensis (Seo and Lee 2010) Xu et al. 2020

Type strain
- DSM 21428, KCTC 22370, MSW-14

Synonyms
- "Alterierythrobacter marensis"; Altererythrobacter marensis Seo and Lee 2010

Species of bacterium

Pelagerythrobacter marensis is a Gram-negative bacterium from the genus Pelagerythrobacter which has been isolated from seawater near the Mara Island on Korea.
