= Aurantiacibacter marinus =

Scientific classification
- Domain: Bacteria
- Kingdom: Pseudomonadati
- Phylum: Pseudomonadota
- Class: Alphaproteobacteria
- Order: Sphingomonadales
- Family: Erythrobacteraceae
- Genus: Aurantiacibacter
- Species: A. marinus

Binomial name
- Aurantiacibacter marinus (Jung et al. 2012) Xu et al. 2020

Type strain
- CCUG 60528, HWDM-33, KCTC 23554

Synonyms
- Erythrobacter marinus Jung et al. 2012

Species of bacterium

Aurantiacibacter marinus is a Gram-negative, ovoid to rod-shaped and non-motile bacteria from the genus Aurantiacibacter which has been isolated from seawater from the Yellow Sea in Korea.
