= Tsuneonella mangrovi =

Scientific classification
- Domain: Bacteria
- Kingdom: Pseudomonadati
- Phylum: Pseudomonadota
- Class: Alphaproteobacteria
- Order: Sphingomonadales
- Family: Erythrobacteraceae
- Genus: Tsuneonella
- Species: T. mangrovi

Binomial name
- Tsuneonella mangrovi (Liao et al. 2017) Xu et al. 2020

Type strain
- C9-11, JCM 32056, MCCC 1K03311

Synonyms
- "Altererythrobacter mangrovensis"; Altererythrobacter mangrovi Liao et al. 2017

Species of bacterium

Tsuneonella mangrovi is a Gram-negative, rod-shaped and facultative anaerobic bacterium from the genus Tsuneonella which has been isolated from mangrove sediments from Zhangzhou in China.
