= Altericroceibacterium xinjiangense =

Scientific classification
- Domain: Bacteria
- Kingdom: Pseudomonadati
- Phylum: Pseudomonadota
- Class: Alphaproteobacteria
- Order: Sphingomonadales
- Family: Erythrobacteraceae
- Genus: Altericroceibacterium
- Species: A. xinjiangense

Binomial name
- Altericroceibacterium xinjiangense (Xue et al. 2012) Xu et al. 2020

Type strain
- S3-63, CCTCC AB 207166, CIP 110125

Synonyms
- Altererythrobacter xinjiangensis Xue et al. 2012

Species of bacterium

Altericroceibacterium xinjiangense is a Gram-negative, strictly aerobic, rod-shaped and non-motile bacterium from the genus Altericroceibacterium which has been isolated from desert sand from Xinjiang in China.
