= Altererythrobacter ishigakiensis =

Scientific classification
- Domain: Bacteria
- Kingdom: Pseudomonadati
- Phylum: Pseudomonadota
- Class: Alphaproteobacteria
- Order: Sphingomonadales
- Family: Erythrobacteraceae
- Genus: Altererythrobacter
- Species: A. ishigakiensis

Binomial name
- Altererythrobacter ishigakiensis Matsumoto et al. 2011

Type strain
- ATCC BAA-2084, JPCCMB0017, NBRC 107699, NITE-AP48

Synonyms
- Erythrobacter ishigakiensis

Species of bacterium

Altererythrobacter ishigakiensis is a Gram-negative, non-spore-forming, halophilic and non-motile bacterium from the genus Altererythrobacter which has been isolated from the coastal area of Okinawa on Japan. Altererythrobacter ishigakiensis produces astaxanthin.
