= Aurantiacibacter xanthus =

Scientific classification
- Domain: Bacteria
- Kingdom: Pseudomonadati
- Phylum: Pseudomonadota
- Class: Alphaproteobacteria
- Order: Sphingomonadales
- Family: Erythrobacteraceae
- Genus: Aurantiacibacter
- Species: A. xanthus

Binomial name
- Aurantiacibacter xanthus (Li et al. 2017) Xu et al. 2020

Type strain
- CCTCC AB 2015396, KCTC 42669, SM1501

Synonyms
- Erythrobacter xanthus Li et al. 2017

Species of bacterium

Aurantiacibacter xanthus is a Gram-negative, aerobic and rod-shaped bacteria from the genus Aurantiacibacter which has been isolated from seawater from the South China Sea.
