= Pontixanthobacter aquaemixtae =

Scientific classification
- Domain: Bacteria
- Kingdom: Pseudomonadati
- Phylum: Pseudomonadota
- Class: Alphaproteobacteria
- Order: Sphingomonadales
- Family: Erythrobacteraceae
- Genus: Pontixanthobacter
- Species: P. aquaemixtae

Binomial name
- Pontixanthobacter aquaemixtae (Park et al. 2017) Xu et al. 2020

Type strain
- JSSK-8, KCTC 52763, NBRC 112764

Synonyms
- Altererythrobacter aquaemixtae Park et al. 2017

Species of bacterium

Pontixanthobacter aquaemixtae is a Gram-negative, aerobic and non-motile bacterium from the genus Pontixanthobacter.
