= Erythrobacter ramosus =

Scientific classification
- Domain: Bacteria
- Kingdom: Pseudomonadati
- Phylum: Pseudomonadota
- Class: Alphaproteobacteria
- Order: Sphingomonadales
- Family: Erythrobacteraceae
- Genus: Erythrobacter
- Species: E. ramosus

Binomial name
- Erythrobacter ramosus (Yurkov et al. 1994) Xu et al. 2020

Synonyms
- Erythromicrobium ramosum Yurkov et al. 1994

Species of bacterium

Erythrobacter ramosus is a species of bacterium.

== Description ==
It is an obligately aerobic, bacteriochlorophyll a-containing bacteria.
