= Tsuneonella aeria =

Scientific classification
- Domain: Bacteria
- Kingdom: Pseudomonadati
- Phylum: Pseudomonadota
- Class: Alphaproteobacteria
- Order: Sphingomonadales
- Family: Erythrobacteraceae
- Genus: Tsuneonella
- Species: T. aeria

Binomial name
- Tsuneonella aeria (Xue et al. 2016) Xu et al. 2020

Type strain
- 100921-2, CFCC 14287, KCTC 42844

Synonyms
- Altererythrobacter aerius Xue et al. 2016

Species of bacterium

Tsuneonella aeria is a Gram-negative and strictly aerobic bacterium from the genus Tsuneonella which has been isolated from air from the Xiangshan Mountain.
