= Croceibacterium soli =

Scientific classification
- Domain: Bacteria
- Kingdom: Pseudomonadati
- Phylum: Pseudomonadota
- Class: Alphaproteobacteria
- Order: Sphingomonadales
- Family: Erythrobacteraceae
- Genus: Croceibacterium
- Species: C. soli

Binomial name
- Croceibacterium soli (Zhao et al. 2017) Xu et al. 2020

Type strain
- KCTC 52135, MCCC 1K02066, strain MN-1

Synonyms
- Altererythrobacter soli Zhao et al. 2017

Species of bacterium

Croceibacterium soli is a Gram-negative, strictly aerobic and rod-shaped bacterium from the genus Croceibacterium which has been isolated from desert sand from the Tengger Desert.
