= Aurantiacibacter gangjinensis =

Scientific classification
- Domain: Bacteria
- Kingdom: Pseudomonadati
- Phylum: Pseudomonadota
- Class: Alphaproteobacteria
- Order: Sphingomonadales
- Family: Erythrobacteraceae
- Genus: Aurantiacibacter
- Species: A. gangjinensis

Binomial name
- Aurantiacibacter gangjinensis (Lee et al. 2010) Xu et al. 2020

Type strain
- JCM 15420, KCTC 22330, K7-2

Synonyms
- Erythrobacter gangjinensis Lee et al. 2010

Species of bacterium

Aurantiacibacter gangjinensis is a Gram-negative and aerobic bacteria from the genus Aurantiacibacter which has been isolated from seawater from Gangjin Bay in Korea.
