= Pontixanthobacter gangjinensis =

Scientific classification
- Domain: Bacteria
- Kingdom: Pseudomonadati
- Phylum: Pseudomonadota
- Class: Alphaproteobacteria
- Order: Sphingomonadales
- Family: Erythrobacteraceae
- Genus: Pontixanthobacter
- Species: P. gangjinensis

Binomial name
- Pontixanthobacter gangjinensis (Jeong et al. 2013) Xu et al. 2020

Type strain
- KJ7, JCM 17802, KACC 16190

Synonyms
- Altererythrobacter gangjinensis Jeong et al. 2013

Species of bacterium

Pontixanthobacter gangjinensis is a Gram-negative, aerobic, halotolerant and non-motile bacterium from the genus Pontixanthobacter which has been isolated from tidal flat from Gangjin bay on Korea.
