= Pontixanthobacter luteolus =

Scientific classification
- Domain: Bacteria
- Kingdom: Pseudomonadati
- Phylum: Pseudomonadota
- Class: Alphaproteobacteria
- Order: Sphingomonadales
- Family: Erythrobacteraceae
- Genus: Pontixanthobacter
- Species: P. luteolus

Binomial name
- Pontixanthobacter luteolus (Yoon et al. 2005) Xu et al. 2020

Type strain
- JCM 12599, KCTC 12311, SW-109

Synonyms
- Erythrobacter luteolus Yoon et al. 2005; Altererythrobacter luteolus (Yoon et al. 2005) Kwon et al. 2007

Species of bacterium

Pontixanthobacter luteolus is a Gram-negative, halophilic and non-spore-forming bacterium from the genus Pontixanthobacter which has been isolated from tidal flat from the Yellow Sea in Korea.
