= Aurantiacibacter arachoides =

Scientific classification
- Domain: Bacteria
- Kingdom: Pseudomonadati
- Phylum: Pseudomonadota
- Class: Alphaproteobacteria
- Order: Sphingomonadales
- Family: Erythrobacteraceae
- Genus: Aurantiacibacter
- Species: A. arachoides

Binomial name
- Aurantiacibacter arachoides (Xing et al. 2017) Xu et al. 2020

Type strain
- CGMCC 1.15507, RC4-10-4, JCM 31277

Synonyms
- Erythrobacter arachoides Xing et al. 2017

Species of bacterium

Aurantiacibacter arachoides is a Gram-negative and rod-shaped bacteria from the genus Aurantiacibacter which has been isolated from the ice core of the East Rongbuk Glacier from the Tibetan Plateau.
