= Pseudopontixanthobacter confluentis =

Scientific classification
- Domain: Bacteria
- Kingdom: Pseudomonadati
- Phylum: Pseudomonadota
- Class: Alphaproteobacteria
- Order: Sphingomonadales
- Family: Erythrobacteraceae
- Genus: Pseudopontixanthobacter
- Species: P. confluentis

Binomial name
- Pseudopontixanthobacter confluentis (Park et al. 2016) Liu et al. 2021

Type strain
- KEM-4, KCTC 52259, NBRC 112305

Synonyms
- Altererythrobacter confluentis Park et al. 2016; Pontixanthobacter confluentis (Park et al. 2016) Xu et al. 2020

Species of bacterium

Pseudopontixanthobacter confluentis is a Gram-negative, aerobic and non-motile bacterium from the genus Pseudopontixanthobacter which has been isolated from the Yellow Sea in Korea.
