= Altererythrobacter deserti =

Scientific classification
- Domain: Bacteria
- Kingdom: Pseudomonadati
- Phylum: Pseudomonadota
- Class: Alphaproteobacteria
- Order: Sphingomonadales
- Family: Erythrobacteraceae
- Genus: Altererythrobacter
- Species: A. deserti

Binomial name
- Altererythrobacter deserti Yan et al. 2017

Type strain
- CGMCC 1.15959, KACC 19190, THG-S3

Species of bacterium

Altererythrobacter deserti is a Gram-negative, aerobic, short-rod-shaped and non-motile bacterium from the genus Altererythrobacter which has been isolated from desert soil.
