= Qipengyuania pelagi =

Scientific classification
- Domain: Bacteria
- Kingdom: Pseudomonadati
- Phylum: Pseudomonadota
- Class: Alphaproteobacteria
- Order: Sphingomonadales
- Family: Erythrobacteraceae
- Genus: Qipengyuania
- Species: Q. pelagi

Binomial name
- Qipengyuania pelagi (Wu et al. 2012) Xu et al. 2020

Type strain
- UST081027-248, JCM 17468, NRRL 59511

Synonyms
- "Erythrobacter discogensis"; Erythrobacter pelagi Wu et al. 2012

Species of bacterium

Qipengyuania pelagi is a Gram-negative, aerobic, rod-shaped, non-spore-forming and non-motile bacteria from the genus Qipengyuania which has been isolated from the Red Sea.
