= Qipengyuania seohaensis =

Scientific classification
- Domain: Bacteria
- Kingdom: Pseudomonadati
- Phylum: Pseudomonadota
- Class: Alphaproteobacteria
- Order: Sphingomonadales
- Family: Erythrobacteraceae
- Genus: Qipengyuania
- Species: Q. seohaensis

Binomial name
- Qipengyuania seohaensis (Yoon et al. 2005) Xu et al. 2020

Type strain
- DSM 16221, JCM 21815, KCTC 12228, SW-135

Synonyms
- Erythrobacter seohaensis Yoon et al. 2005

Species of bacterium

Qipengyuania seohaensis is a Gram-negative, non-spore-forming and slightly halophilic bacteria from the genus Qipengyuania which has been isolated from sea water from the Yellow Sea in Korea.
