= Qipengyuania citrea =

Scientific classification
- Domain: Bacteria
- Kingdom: Pseudomonadati
- Phylum: Pseudomonadota
- Class: Alphaproteobacteria
- Order: Sphingomonadales
- Family: Erythrobacteraceae
- Genus: Qipengyuania
- Species: Q. citrea

Binomial name
- Qipengyuania citrea

Type strain
- CIP 107092, DSM 14432, IAM 15372, JCM 21816, KCTC 12214, RE35F, RE35F/

Synonyms
- Erythrobacter citreus Denner et al. 2002

Species of bacterium

Qipengyuania citrea is a Gram-negative, strictly aerobic, rod-shaped and non-motile bacteria from the genus Qipengyuania which has been isolated from the Bay of Calvi from the Mediterranean Sea near Corsica.
