= Tsuneonella amylolytica =

Scientific classification
- Domain: Bacteria
- Kingdom: Pseudomonadati
- Phylum: Pseudomonadota
- Class: Alphaproteobacteria
- Order: Sphingomonadales
- Family: Erythrobacteraceae
- Genus: Tsuneonella
- Species: T. amylolytica

Binomial name
- Tsuneonella amylolytica (Qu et al. 2019) Xu et al. 2020

Type strain
- NS1

Synonyms
- Altererythrobacter amylolyticus Qu et al. 2019

Bacterium

Tsuneonella amylolytica is a Gram-negative, aerobic and motile bacterium from the genus Tsuneonella which has been isolated from sediments from the Taihu Lake in China.
