= Altererythrobacter aquiaggeris =

Scientific classification
- Domain: Bacteria
- Kingdom: Pseudomonadati
- Phylum: Pseudomonadota
- Class: Alphaproteobacteria
- Order: Sphingomonadales
- Family: Erythrobacteraceae
- Genus: Altererythrobacter
- Species: A. aquiaggeris

Binomial name
- Altererythrobacter aquiaggeris Jung et al. 2017

Type strain
- KCTC 52471, NBRC 112425, strain KEM-3

Species of bacterium

Altererythrobacter aquiaggeris is a Gram-negative and non-motile bacterium from the genusAltererythrobacter which has been isolated from water from the Geumgang Estuary Bank in Korea.
