= Aurantiacibacter atlanticus =

Scientific classification
- Domain: Bacteria
- Kingdom: Pseudomonadati
- Phylum: Pseudomonadota
- Class: Alphaproteobacteria
- Order: Sphingomonadales
- Family: Erythrobacteraceae
- Genus: Aurantiacibacter
- Species: A. atlanticus

Binomial name
- Aurantiacibacter atlanticus (Zhuang et al. 2015) Xu et al. 2020

Synonyms
- Erythrobacter atlanticus Zhuang et al. 2015

Species of bacterium

Aurantiacibacter atlanticus is a Gram-negative, rod-shaped and motile bacteria from the genus Aurantiacibacter which has been isolated from deep-sea sediments from the Atlantic Ocean. Erythrobacter atlanticus has the ability to degrade polycyclic aromatic hydrocarbons.
