= Pelagerythrobacter aerophilus =

Scientific classification
- Domain: Bacteria
- Kingdom: Pseudomonadati
- Phylum: Pseudomonadota
- Class: Alphaproteobacteria
- Order: Sphingomonadales
- Family: Erythrobacteraceae
- Genus: Pelagerythrobacter
- Species: P. aerophilus

Binomial name
- Pelagerythrobacter aerophilus (Meng et al. 2019) Xu et al. 2020

Type strain
- Ery1

Synonyms
- Altererythrobacter aerophilus Meng et al. 2019

Bacterium

Pelagerythrobacter aerophilus is a Gram-negative and rod-shaped bacterium from the genus Pelagerythrobacter which has been isolated from deep-sea seawater from the Mariana Trench.
