= Tsuneonella troitsensis =

Scientific classification
- Domain: Bacteria
- Kingdom: Pseudomonadati
- Phylum: Pseudomonadota
- Class: Alphaproteobacteria
- Order: Sphingomonadales
- Family: Erythrobacteraceae
- Genus: Tsuneonella
- Species: T. troitsensis

Binomial name
- Tsuneonella troitsensis (Nedashkovskaya et al. 2013) Xu et al. 2020

Type strain
- JCM 17037, KCTC 12303, KMM 6042

Synonyms
- Altererythrobacter troitsensis Nedashkovskaya et al. 2013

Species of bacterium

Tsuneonella troitsensis is a Gram-negative, aerobic, halotolerant, rod-shaped and motile bacterium from the genus Tsuneonella which has been isolated from the sea urchin Strongylocentrotus intermedius.
