= Altererythrobacter palmitatis =

Scientific classification
- Domain: Bacteria
- Kingdom: Pseudomonadati
- Phylum: Pseudomonadota
- Class: Alphaproteobacteria
- Order: Sphingomonadales
- Family: Erythrobacteraceae
- Genus: Altererythrobacter
- Species: A. palmitatis

Binomial name
- Altererythrobacter palmitatis Yuan et al. 2017

Species of bacterium

Altererythrobacter palmitatis is a Gram-negative, rod-shaped, moderately thermophilic and motile bacterium from the genus Altererythrobacter.
