= Erythrobacter neustonensis =

Scientific classification
- Domain: Bacteria
- Kingdom: Pseudomonadati
- Phylum: Pseudomonadota
- Class: Alphaproteobacteria
- Order: Sphingomonadales
- Family: Erythrobacteraceae
- Genus: Erythrobacter
- Species: E. neustonensis

Binomial name
- Erythrobacter neustonensis (Fuerst et al. 1993) Xu et al. 2020

Type strain
- ACM 2844, CIP 104070, DSM 9434

Synonyms
- Porphyrobacter neustonensis Fuerst et al. 1993

Species of bacterium

Erythrobacter neustonensis is a pleomorphic and aerobic bacteria from the genus Erythrobacter which has been isolated from a freshwater pond in Brisbane in Australia.
