= Alteraurantiacibacter buctensis =

Scientific classification
- Domain: Bacteria
- Kingdom: Pseudomonadati
- Phylum: Pseudomonadota
- Class: Alphaproteobacteria
- Order: Sphingomonadales
- Family: Erythrobacteraceae
- Genus: Alteraurantiacibacter
- Species: A. buctensis

Binomial name
- Alteraurantiacibacter buctensis (Zhang et al. 2016) Xu et al. 2020

Type strain
- M0322, CGMCC 1.12871, JCM 30112

Synonyms
- Altererythrobacter buctense Zhang et al. 2016; Altererythrobacter buctensis corrig. Zhang et al. 2016; "Altererythrobacter mohesis"

Species of bacterium

Alteraurantiacibacter buctensis is a bacterium from the genus Alteraurantiacibacter which has been isolated from the core of a mudstone from the Mohe Basin in China.
