= Pseudopontixanthobacter sediminis =

Scientific classification
- Domain: Bacteria
- Kingdom: Pseudomonadati
- Phylum: Pseudomonadota
- Class: Alphaproteobacteria
- Order: Sphingomonadales
- Family: Erythrobacteraceae
- Genus: Pseudopontixanthobacter
- Species: P. sediminis

Binomial name
- Pseudopontixanthobacter sediminis (Kim et al. 2016) Liu et al. 2021

Type strain
- KCTC 42453, NBRC 110917, CAU1172

Synonyms
- Altererythrobacter sediminis Kim et al. 2016

Species of bacterium

Pseudopontixanthobacter sediminis is a Gram-negative, non-spore-forming and non-motile bacterium from the genus of Pseudopontixanthobacter which has been isolated from lagoon sediments from the coast of Korea.
