= Alteraurantiacibacter aquimixticola =

Scientific classification
- Domain: Bacteria
- Kingdom: Pseudomonadati
- Phylum: Pseudomonadota
- Class: Alphaproteobacteria
- Order: Sphingomonadales
- Family: Erythrobacteraceae
- Genus: Alteraurantiacibacter
- Species: A. aquimixticola

Binomial name
- Alteraurantiacibacter aquimixticola (Park et al. 2019) Xu et al. 2020

Type strain
- SSKS-13

Synonyms
- Altererythrobacter aquimixticola Park et al. 2019

Bacterium

Alteraurantiacibacter aquimixticola is a Gram-negative, aerobic and non-motile bacterium in the genus Alteraurantiacibacter.
