= Alteripontixanthobacter maritimus =

Scientific classification
- Domain: Bacteria
- Kingdom: Pseudomonadati
- Phylum: Pseudomonadota
- Class: Alphaproteobacteria
- Order: Sphingomonadales
- Family: Erythrobacteraceae
- Genus: Alteripontixanthobacter
- Species: A. maritimus

Binomial name
- Alteripontixanthobacter maritimus (Kang et al. 2019) Xu et al. 2020

Type strain
- HME9302

Synonyms
- Altererythrobacter maritimus

Genus of bacterium

Alteripontixanthobacter maritimus is a Gram-negative and rod-shaped bacterium from the genus of Alteripontixanthobacter which has been isolated from seawater from the Yellow Sea.
