= Alteraurantiacibacter aestuarii =

Scientific classification
- Domain: Bacteria
- Kingdom: Pseudomonadati
- Phylum: Pseudomonadota
- Class: Alphaproteobacteria
- Order: Sphingomonadales
- Family: Erythrobacteraceae
- Genus: Alteraurantiacibacter
- Species: A. aestuarii

Binomial name
- Alteraurantiacibacter aestuarii (Park et al. 2011) Xu et al. 2020

Type strain
- KYW147, JCM 16339, KCTC 22735

Synonyms
- Altererythrobacter aestuarii Park et al. 2011

Species of bacterium

Alteraurantiacibacter aestuarii is a Gram-negative and aerobic bacterium from the genus Alteraurantiacibacter which has been isolated from seawater from the South Sea in Korea.
