= Croceibacterium salegens =

Scientific classification
- Domain: Bacteria
- Kingdom: Pseudomonadati
- Phylum: Pseudomonadota
- Class: Alphaproteobacteria
- Order: Sphingomonadales
- Family: Erythrobacteraceae
- Genus: Croceibacterium
- Species: C. salegens

Binomial name
- Croceibacterium salegens (Liang et al. 2017) Xu et al. 2020

Type strain
- KCTC 52267, MCCC 1K01500, strain XY-R17

Synonyms
- Altererythrobacter salegens Liang et al. 2017

Species of bacterium

Croceibacterium salegens is a Gram-negative, rod-shaped and slightly halophilic bacterium from the genus Croceibacterium which has been isolated from sediments from Mai Po.
