= Erythrobacter longus =

Scientific classification
- Domain: Bacteria
- Kingdom: Pseudomonadati
- Phylum: Pseudomonadota
- Class: Alphaproteobacteria
- Order: Sphingomonadales
- Family: Erythrobacteraceae
- Genus: Erythrobacter
- Species: E. longus

Binomial name
- Erythrobacter longus Shiba and Simidu 1982

Species of bacterium

Erythrobacter longus is a species of bacteria, the genus' type species. It contains bacteriochlorophyll a. It is motile by means of subpolar flagella. Its type strain is OCh101 (= IFO 14126).
