= Parerythrobacter jejuensis =

Scientific classification
- Domain: Bacteria
- Kingdom: Pseudomonadati
- Phylum: Pseudomonadota
- Class: Alphaproteobacteria
- Order: Sphingomonadales
- Family: Erythrobacteraceae
- Genus: Parerythrobacter
- Species: P. jejuensis

Binomial name
- Parerythrobacter jejuensis (Yoon et al. 2013) Xu et al. 2020

Type strain
- BL170, JCM 16677, KCTC 23090, CNU001

Synonyms
- Erythrobacter jejuensis Yoon et al. 2013

Species of bacterium

Parerythrobacter jejuensis is a Gram-negative, strictly aerobic, rod-shaped and non-motile bacteria from the genus Parerythrobacter which has been isolated from seawater from the coast of Jeju Island in Korea.
