= Altererythrobacter rubellus =

Scientific classification
- Domain: Bacteria
- Kingdom: Pseudomonadati
- Phylum: Pseudomonadota
- Class: Alphaproteobacteria
- Order: Sphingomonadales
- Family: Erythrobacteraceae
- Genus: Altererythrobacter
- Species: A. rubellus

Binomial name
- Altererythrobacter rubellus Yoon and Ryu 2020

Type strain
- KMU-45

Species of bacterium

Altererythrobacter rubellus is a Gram-negative, strictly aerobic, rod-shaped and non-motile bacterium from the genus Altererythrobacter which has been isolated from seawater from Korea.
