= Erythrobacter donghaensis =

Scientific classification
- Domain: Bacteria
- Kingdom: Pseudomonadati
- Phylum: Pseudomonadota
- Class: Alphaproteobacteria
- Order: Sphingomonadales
- Family: Erythrobacteraceae
- Genus: Erythrobacter
- Species: E. donghaensis

Binomial name
- Erythrobacter donghaensis (Yoon et al. 2004) Xu et al. 2020

Type strain
- DSM 16220, KCTC 12229, SW-132

Synonyms
- Porphyrobacter donghaensis Yoon et al. 2004

Species of bacterium

Erythrobacter donghaensis is a Gram-negative, non-spore-forming, slightly halophilic and motile bacteria from the genus Erythrobacter which has been isolated from the Sea of Japan in Korea.
