= Pontixanthobacter aestiaquae =

Scientific classification
- Domain: Bacteria
- Kingdom: Pseudomonadati
- Phylum: Pseudomonadota
- Class: Alphaproteobacteria
- Order: Sphingomonadales
- Family: Erythrobacteraceae
- Genus: Pontixanthobacter
- Species: P. aestiaquae

Binomial name
- Pontixanthobacter aestiaquae (Jung et al. 2014) Xu et al. 2020

Type strain
- HDW-31, CECT 8527, KCTC 42006

Synonyms
- Altererythrobacter aquiaestus [sic]; Altererythrobacter aestiaquae Jung et al. 2014

Species of bacterium

Pontixanthobacter aestiaquae is a Gram-negative bacterium from the genus Pontixanthobacter which has been isolated from seawater from the Yellow Sea in Korea.
