= Croceibacterium atlanticum =

Scientific classification
- Domain: Bacteria
- Kingdom: Pseudomonadati
- Phylum: Pseudomonadota
- Class: Alphaproteobacteria
- Order: Sphingomonadales
- Family: Erythrobacteraceae
- Genus: Croceibacterium
- Species: C. atlanticum

Binomial name
- Croceibacterium atlanticum (Wu et al. 2014) Xu et al. 2020

Type strain
- 26DY36, CGMCC 1.12411, JCM 18865

Synonyms
- Altererythrobacter atlanticus Wu et al. 2014

Species of bacterium

Croceibacterium atlanticum is a Gram-negative and short rod-shaped bacterium from the genus Croceibacterium which has been isolated from deep-sea sediments from the North Atlantic Rise in China.
