= Tsuneonella dongtanensis =

Scientific classification
- Domain: Bacteria
- Kingdom: Pseudomonadati
- Phylum: Pseudomonadota
- Class: Alphaproteobacteria
- Order: Sphingomonadales
- Family: Erythrobacteraceae
- Genus: Tsuneonella
- Species: T. dongtanensis

Binomial name
- Tsuneonella dongtanensis (Fan et al. 2011) Xu et al. 2020

Type strain
- JM27, CCTCC AB 209199, KCTC 22672

Synonyms
- Altererythrobacter dongtanensis Fan et al. 2011

Species of bacterium

Tsuneonella dongtanensis is a Gram-negative, rod-shaped and non-spore-forming bacterium from the genus Tsuneonella which has been isolated from tidal flat from the Dongtan Wetland on the Chongming Island in China.
