= Croceibacterium xixiisoli =

Scientific classification
- Domain: Bacteria
- Kingdom: Pseudomonadati
- Phylum: Pseudomonadota
- Class: Alphaproteobacteria
- Order: Sphingomonadales
- Family: Erythrobacteraceae
- Genus: Croceibacterium
- Species: C. xixiisoli

Binomial name
- Croceibacterium xixiisoli (Yuan et al. 2017) Xu et al. 2020

Type strain
- CGMCC 1.12804, NBRC 110413, strain S36

Synonyms
- Altererythrobacter xixiisoli Yuan et al. 2017

Species of bacterium

Croceibacterium xixiisoli is a Gram-negative, aerobic and non-motile bacterium from the genus Croceibacterium which has been isolated from soil from the Xixi wetland from China.
