= Erythrobacter colymbi =

Scientific classification
- Domain: Bacteria
- Kingdom: Pseudomonadati
- Phylum: Pseudomonadota
- Class: Alphaproteobacteria
- Order: Sphingomonadales
- Family: Erythrobacteraceae
- Genus: Erythrobacter
- Species: E. colymbi

Binomial name
- Erythrobacter colymbi (Furuhata et al. 2013) Xu et al. 2020

Type strain
- JCM 18338, KCTC 32078, TPW-24

Synonyms
- Porphyrobacter colymbi Furuhata et al. 2013

Species of bacterium

Erythrobacter colymbi is a bacterium from the genus Erythrobacter which has been isolated from water from a swimming pool in Tokyo in Japan.
