= Aurantiacibacter aquimixticola =

Scientific classification
- Domain: Bacteria
- Kingdom: Pseudomonadati
- Phylum: Pseudomonadota
- Class: Alphaproteobacteria
- Order: Sphingomonadales
- Family: Erythrobacteraceae
- Genus: Aurantiacibacter
- Species: A. aquimixticola

Binomial name
- Aurantiacibacter aquimixticola (Park et al. 2017) Xu et al. 2020

Type strain
- KCTC 52764, NBRC 112765, strain JSSK-14

Synonyms
- Erythrobacter aquimixticola Park et al. 2017

Species of bacterium

Aurantiacibacter aquimixticola is a Gram-negative, aerobic, rod-shaped and non-motile bacteria from the genus Aurantiacibacter which has been isolated from water from Jeju Island in Korea.
