= Erythrobacter cryptus =

Scientific classification
- Domain: Bacteria
- Kingdom: Pseudomonadati
- Phylum: Pseudomonadota
- Class: Alphaproteobacteria
- Order: Sphingomonadales
- Family: Erythrobacteraceae
- Genus: Erythrobacter
- Species: E. cryptus

Binomial name
- Erythrobacter cryptus (da Costa et al. 2003) Xu et al. 2020

Type strain
- ALC-2, ATCC BAA-386, ATCC BAA-389, CIP 108282, DSM 12079

Synonyms
- Porphyrobacter cryptus da Costa et al. 2003

Species of Alphaproteobacteria

Erythrobacter cryptus is an aerobic and slightly thermophilic bacteria from the genus Erythrobacter which has been isolated from a hot spring from the Alafache Spa in Portugal.
