= Qipengyuania oceanensis =

Scientific classification
- Domain: Bacteria
- Kingdom: Pseudomonadati
- Phylum: Pseudomonadota
- Class: Alphaproteobacteria
- Order: Sphingomonadales
- Family: Erythrobacteraceae
- Genus: Qipengyuania
- Species: Q. oceanensis

Binomial name
- Qipengyuania oceanensis (Yang et al. 2015) Xu et al. 2020

Type strain
- Y2, CGMCC 1.12752, LMG 28109

Synonyms
- Altererythrobacter oceanensis Yang et al. 2015

Species of bacterium

Qipengyuania oceanensis is a Gram-negative, ovoid-rod shaped and strictly aerobic bacterium from the genus Qipengyuania which has been isolated from deep-sea sediments from the Western Pacific Ocean.
