= Caenibius tardaugens =

Scientific classification
- Domain: Bacteria
- Kingdom: Pseudomonadati
- Phylum: Pseudomonadota
- Class: Alphaproteobacteria
- Order: Sphingomonadales
- Family: Erythrobacteraceae
- Genus: Caenibius
- Species: C. tardaugens

Binomial name
- Caenibius tardaugens (Fujii et al. 2003) Hördt et al. 2020

Type strain
- ATCC BAA-531, IFO 16725, JCM 11434, NBRC 16725, ARI-1

Synonyms
- Novosphingobium tardaugens Fujii et al. 2003

Species of bacterium

Caenibius tardaugens is an oestradiol-degrading bacterium from the family Erythrobacteraceae which has been isolated from activated sludge from a sewage treatment plant in Japan.
