= Altererythrobacter fulvus =

Scientific classification
- Domain: Bacteria
- Kingdom: Pseudomonadati
- Phylum: Pseudomonadota
- Class: Alphaproteobacteria
- Order: Sphingomonadales
- Family: Erythrobacteraceae
- Genus: Altererythrobacter
- Species: A. fulvus

Binomial name
- Altererythrobacter fulvus Dahal and Kim 2018

Type strain
- KACC 19119, KEMB 9005-542, NBRC 112676, strain S-54

Species of bacterium

Altererythrobacter fulvus is a Gram-negative, aerobic, rod-shaped, non-spore-forming and non-motile bacterium from the genusAltererythrobacter which has been isolated from forest soil.
