= Qipengyuania flava =

Scientific classification
- Domain: Bacteria
- Kingdom: Pseudomonadati
- Phylum: Pseudomonadota
- Class: Alphaproteobacteria
- Order: Sphingomonadales
- Family: Erythrobacteraceae
- Genus: Qipengyuania
- Species: Q. flava

Binomial name
- Qipengyuania flava (Yoon et al. 2003) Lee and Kim 2020

Type strain
- JCM 11808, KCCM 41642, SW-46

Synonyms
- Erythrobacter flavus Yoon et al. 2003

Species of bacterium

Qipengyuania flava is a Gram-negative, non-spore-forming, slightly halophilic and motile bacteria from the genus Qipengyuania which has been isolated from sea water from the Sea of Japan from the Hwajinpo beach in Korea.
