= Qipengyuania nanhaisediminis =

Scientific classification
- Domain: Bacteria
- Kingdom: Pseudomonadati
- Phylum: Pseudomonadota
- Class: Alphaproteobacteria
- Order: Sphingomonadales
- Family: Erythrobacteraceae
- Genus: Qipengyuania
- Species: Q. nanhaisediminis

Binomial name
- Qipengyuania nanhaisediminis (Xu et al. 2010) Xu et al. 2020

Type strain
- CGMCC 1.7715, T30, JCM 16125

Synonyms
- "Erythrobacter lutta"; Erythrobacter nanhaisediminis Xu et al. 2010

Species of bacterium

Qipengyuania nanhaisediminis is a Gram-negative, rod-shaped and slightly halophilic bacteria from the genus Qipengyuania which has been isolated from sediment from the South China Sea.
