= Altererythrobacter epoxidivorans =

Scientific classification
- Domain: Bacteria
- Kingdom: Pseudomonadati
- Phylum: Pseudomonadota
- Class: Alphaproteobacteria
- Order: Sphingomonadales
- Family: Erythrobacteraceae
- Genus: Altererythrobacter
- Species: A. epoxidivorans

Binomial name
- Altererythrobacter epoxidivorans Kwon et al. 2007

Type strain
- JCM 13815, KCCM 42314, JCS350

Synonyms
- Alterierythrobacter epoxidivorans Osterythrobacter epoxidivorans

Species of bacterium

Altererythrobacter epoxidivorans is a bacterium from the genus Altererythrobacter.
