= Altericroceibacterium indicum =

Scientific classification
- Domain: Bacteria
- Kingdom: Pseudomonadati
- Phylum: Pseudomonadota
- Class: Alphaproteobacteria
- Order: Sphingomonadales
- Family: Erythrobacteraceae
- Genus: Altericroceibacterium
- Species: A. indicum

Binomial name
- Altericroceibacterium indicum (Ramesh Kumar et al. 2008) Xu et al. 2020

Type strain
- DSM 18604, LMG 23789, MSSRF26, Nair MSSRF26

Synonyms
- Erythrobacter indica; Altererythrobacter indicus Ramesh Kumar et al. 2008

Species of bacterium

Altericroceibacterium indicum is a gram-negative, rod-shaped and non-spore-forming bacterium from the genus Altericroceibacterium which has been isolated from the rhizosphere from the rice plant Oryza coarctata (syn. Porteresia coarctata) in Pichavaram in India.
