= Qipengyuania vulgaris =

Scientific classification
- Domain: Bacteria
- Kingdom: Pseudomonadati
- Phylum: Pseudomonadota
- Class: Alphaproteobacteria
- Order: Sphingomonadales
- Family: Erythrobacteraceae
- Genus: Qipengyuania
- Species: Q. vulgaris

Binomial name
- Qipengyuania vulgaris (Ivanova et al. 2006) Xu et al. 2020

Type strain
- CIP 108956, KMM 3465, 022-2-10

Synonyms
- Erythrobacter vulgaris Ivanova et al. 2006

Species of bacterium

Qipengyuania vulgaris is a Gram-negative and aerobic bacteria from the genus Qipengyuania which has been isolated from a starfish (Stellaster equestris) from the South China Sea.
