= Altererythrobacter lauratis =

Scientific classification
- Domain: Bacteria
- Kingdom: Pseudomonadati
- Phylum: Pseudomonadota
- Class: Alphaproteobacteria
- Order: Sphingomonadales
- Family: Erythrobacteraceae
- Genus: Altererythrobacter
- Species: A. lauratis

Binomial name
- Altererythrobacter lauratis Yuan et al. 2017

Type strain
- CCTCC AB2016268, KCTC 52606, YIM 75003

Species of bacterium

Altererythrobacter lauratis is a Gram-negative, moderately thermophilic, rod-shaped and motile bacterium from the genus Altererythrobacter which has been isolated from the Tagejia hot spring from Tibet.
