= Deer Cave (disambiguation) =

Deer Cave may refer to:

- Deer Cave (Gua Rusa), a show cave in Gunung Mulu National Park, Malaysia
- Deer Cave (Otranto) (Grotta dei Cervi), a paleoanthropological cave near Otranto, Italy
- Red Deer Cave, a paleoanthropogical cave in China containing the remains of the Red Deer Cave people
