= Erythrobacter litoralis =

Erythrobacter longus

Scientific classification
- Domain: Bacteria
- Kingdom: Pseudomonadati
- Phylum: Pseudomonadota
- Class: Alphaproteobacteria
- Order: Sphingomonadales
- Family: Erythrobacteraceae
- Genus: Erythrobacter
- Species: E. litoralis

Binomial name
- Erythrobacter litoralis Yurkov et al. 1994

Species of bacterium

Erythrobacter litoralis is a species of bacterium. E. litoralis strain HTCC2594 was first sequenced in 2009. Erythrobacter litoralis strain DSM 8509 was developed as a comparative genetic model system to investigate the role of visible light in regulation of the general stress response in Alphaproteobacteria. The complete genome sequence of E. litoralis DSM 8509 has been published.

It is an obligately aerobic, bacteriochlorophyll a-containing bacterium.
