= Aurantiacibacter luteus =

Scientific classification
- Domain: Bacteria
- Kingdom: Pseudomonadati
- Phylum: Pseudomonadota
- Class: Alphaproteobacteria
- Order: Sphingomonadales
- Family: Erythrobacteraceae
- Genus: Aurantiacibacter
- Species: A. luteus

Binomial name
- Aurantiacibacter luteus (Lei et al. 2015) Xu et al. 2020

Type strain
- KCTC 42179, MCCC 1F01227, KA37

Synonyms
- Erythrobacter luteus Lei et al. 2015

Species of bacterium

Aurantiacibacter luteus is a Gram-negative and aerobic bacteria from the genus Aurantiacibacter which has been isolated from mangrove sediment from the Yunxiao mangrove National Nature Reserve in the Fujian Province in China.
