= Aurantiacibacter odishensis =

Scientific classification
- Domain: Bacteria
- Kingdom: Pseudomonadati
- Phylum: Pseudomonadota
- Class: Alphaproteobacteria
- Order: Sphingomonadales
- Family: Erythrobacteraceae
- Genus: Aurantiacibacter
- Species: A. odishensis

Binomial name
- Aurantiacibacter odishensis (Subhash et al. 2013) Xu et al. 2020

Type strain
- JA747, KCTC 23981, NBRC 108930

Synonyms
- Erythrobacter odishensis Subhash et al. 2013

Species of bacterium

Aurantiacibacter odishensis is a bacterium from the genus Aurantiacibacter which has been isolated from dry soil.
