= Altericroceibacterium endophyticum =

Scientific classification
- Domain: Bacteria
- Kingdom: Pseudomonadati
- Phylum: Pseudomonadota
- Class: Alphaproteobacteria
- Order: Sphingomonadales
- Family: Erythrobacteraceae
- Genus: Altericroceibacterium
- Species: A. endophyticum

Binomial name
- Altericroceibacterium endophyticum (Fidalgo et al. 2017) Xu et al. 2020

Type strain
- BR75, CECT 9129, LMG 29518

Synonyms
- Altererythrobacter endophyticum [sic]; Altererythrobacter endophyticus Fidalgo et al. 2017

Species of bacterium

Altericroceibacterium endophyticum is a Gram-negative, rod-shaped and motile bacterium from the genus Altericroceibacterium which has been isolated from the plant Halimione portulacoides.
