= Altererythrobacter rigui =

Scientific classification
- Domain: Bacteria
- Kingdom: Pseudomonadati
- Phylum: Pseudomonadota
- Class: Alphaproteobacteria
- Order: Sphingomonadales
- Family: Erythrobacteraceae
- Genus: Altererythrobacter
- Species: A. rigui

Binomial name
- Altererythrobacter rigui Kang et al. 2016

Type strain
- JCM 30975, KCTC 42620, strain WW3

Species of bacterium

Altererythrobacter rigui is a Gram-negative, aerobic and non-motile bacterium from the genus Altererythrobacter which has been isolated from water from the Woopo wetland in Korea.
