= Pelagerythrobacter marinus =

Scientific classification
- Domain: Bacteria
- Kingdom: Pseudomonadati
- Phylum: Pseudomonadota
- Class: Alphaproteobacteria
- Order: Sphingomonadales
- Family: Erythrobacteraceae
- Genus: Pelagerythrobacter
- Species: P. marinus

Binomial name
- Pelagerythrobacter marinus (Lai et al. 2009) Xu et al. 2020

Type strain
- CCTCC AB 208229, H32, LMG 24629, MCCC 1A01070

Synonyms
- "Alterierythrobacter marina"; Altererythrobacter marinus Lai et al. 2009

Species of bacterium

Pelagerythrobacter marinus is a bacterium from the genus Pelagerythrobacter which has been isolated from deep seawater from the Indian Ocean.
