= Altererythrobacter xiamenensis =

Scientific classification
- Domain: Bacteria
- Kingdom: Pseudomonadati
- Phylum: Pseudomonadota
- Class: Alphaproteobacteria
- Order: Sphingomonadales
- Family: Erythrobacteraceae
- Genus: Altererythrobacter
- Species: A. xiamenensis

Binomial name
- Altererythrobacter xiamenensis Lei et al. 2014

Type strain
- LY02, CGMCC 1.12494, KCTC 32398, NBRC 109638

Species of bacterium

Altererythrobacter xiamenensis is a Gram-negative and aerobic bacterium from the genus of Altererythrobacter which has been isolated from seawater in Xiamen in China.
