= Erythrobacter tepidarius =

Scientific classification
- Domain: Bacteria
- Kingdom: Pseudomonadati
- Phylum: Pseudomonadota
- Class: Alphaproteobacteria
- Order: Sphingomonadales
- Family: Erythrobacteraceae
- Genus: Erythrobacter
- Species: E. tepidarius"

Binomial name
- Erythrobacter tepidarius" (Hanada et al. 1997) Xu et al. 2020

Type strain
- DSM 10594, OT3

Synonyms
- "Porphyrobacter tepidarius" Hanada et al. 1997

Species of bacterium

"Erythrobacter tepidarius" is a moderately thermophilic and non-motile bacteria from the genus of Erythrobacter which has been isolated from a hot spring in Usami in Japan.
