= Agromyces insulae =

Scientific classification
- Domain: Bacteria
- Kingdom: Bacillati
- Phylum: Actinomycetota
- Class: Actinomycetia
- Order: Micrococcales
- Family: Microbacteriaceae
- Genus: Agromyces
- Species: A. insulae

Binomial name
- Agromyces insulae Huang et al. 2016

Type strain
- CFH S0483, CCTCC AB 2014301, KCTC 39117

Species of bacterium

Agromyces insulae is a Gram-negative, aerobic and non-motile bacterium from the genus of Agromyces which has been isolated from soil from the Cát Bà Island in Vietnam.
