= Alteriqipengyuania halimionae =

Scientific classification
- Domain: Bacteria
- Kingdom: Pseudomonadati
- Phylum: Pseudomonadota
- Class: Alphaproteobacteria
- Order: Sphingomonadales
- Family: Sphingomonadaceae
- Genus: Alteriqipengyuania
- Species: A. halimionae

Binomial name
- Alteriqipengyuania halimionae (Fidalgo et al. 2017) Xu et al. 2020

Type strain
- CECT 9130; CPA-5; LMG 29519

Synonyms
- "Altererythrobacter aveirensis"; Altererythrobacter halimionae Fidalgo et al. 2017

Bacterium

Alteriqipengyuania halimionae is a Gram-negative, rod-shaped and motile bacterium from the genus Alteriqipengyuania which has been isolated from the plant Halimione portulacoides.
