= Pelagerythrobacter =

Scientific classification
- Domain: Bacteria
- Kingdom: Pseudomonadati
- Phylum: Pseudomonadota
- Class: Alphaproteobacteria
- Order: Sphingomonadales
- Family: Erythrobacteraceae
- Genus: Pelagerythrobacter; Xu et al. 2020

Species
- Pelagerythrobacter aerophilus (Meng et al. 2019) Xu et al. 2020; Pelagerythrobacter marensis (Seo and Lee 2010) Xu et al. 2020; Pelagerythrobacter marinus (Lai et al. 2009) Xu et al. 2020; Pelagerythrobacter rhizovicinus (Li et al. 2020) Gao et al. 2021

Genus of bacterium

Pelagerythrobacter is a genus of Gram-negative bacteria.
