= Agromyces ulmi =

Scientific classification
- Domain: Bacteria
- Kingdom: Bacillati
- Phylum: Actinomycetota
- Class: Actinomycetia
- Order: Micrococcales
- Family: Microbacteriaceae
- Genus: Agromyces
- Species: A. ulmi

Binomial name
- Agromyces ulmi Rivas et al. 2004

Type strain
- DSM 15747, JCM 13315, LMG 21954, XIL01

Species of bacterium

Agromyces ulmi is a Gram-negative, aerobic, xylanolytic and non-motile bacterium from the genus of Agromyces which has been isolated from sawdust of the tree Ulmus nigra from Salamanca in Spain.
