= Croceicoccus =

Scientific classification
- Domain: Bacteria
- Kingdom: Pseudomonadati
- Phylum: Pseudomonadota
- Class: Alphaproteobacteria
- Order: Sphingomonadales
- Family: Erythrobacteraceae
- Genus: Croceicoccus; Xu et al. 2009

Type species
- C. marinus

Genus of bacteria

Croceicoccus is a genus in the phylum Pseudomonadota (Bacteria).

== Etymology ==
The name Croceicoccus derives from:
Latin adjective croceus, yellow, golden; Neo-Latin masculine gender noun coccus (from Greek masculine gender noun kokkos (κόκκος)), grain or berry; Neo-Latin masculine gender noun Croceicoccus, yellow coccus, referring to a yellow coccoid-shaped bacterium.

== Species ==
The genus contains a single species, namely C. marinus ( Xu et al. 2009, (Type species of the genus).; Latin masculine gender adjective marinus, of or belonging to the sea, marine.)

== See also ==
- Bacterial taxonomy
- Microbiology
