= Erythrobacter =

Scientific classification
- Domain: Bacteria
- Kingdom: Pseudomonadati
- Phylum: Pseudomonadota
- Class: Alphaproteobacteria
- Order: Sphingomonadales
- Family: Erythrobacteraceae
- Genus: Erythrobacter; Shiba and Simidu 1982

Type species
- Erythrobacter longus

Species
- See text.

Synonyms
- Porphyrobacter Fuerst et al. 1993; Erythromicrobium Yurkov et al. 1994

Genus of bacteria

Erythrobacter is a Gram-negative and rod-shaped bacteria genus from the family Erythrobacteraceae.

== Species ==
Erythrobacter comprises the followings species:

- Erythrobacter alti Yoon 2020
- "Erythrobacter aureus" Tang et al. 2019
- Erythrobacter colymbi (Furuhata et al. 2013) Xu et al. 2020
- Erythrobacter cryptus (da Costa et al. 2003) Xu et al. 2020
- Erythrobacter dokdonensis (Yoon et al. 2006) Xu et al. 2020
- Erythrobacter donghaensis (Yoon et al. 2004) Xu et al. 2020
- Erythrobacter insulae Park et al. 2020
- Erythrobacter litoralis Yurkov et al. 1994
- Erythrobacter longus Shiba and Simidu 1982
- "Erythrobacter mangrovi" Ye et al. 2020
- "Erythrobacter nanhaiensis" Chen et al. 2019
- Erythrobacter neustonensis (Fuerst et al. 1993) Xu et al. 2020
- Erythrobacter ramosus (Yurkov et al. 1994) Xu et al. 2020
- Erythrobacter sanguineus (Hiraishi et al. 2002) Xu et al. 2020
- "Erythrobacter tepidarius" (Hanada et al. 1997) Xu et al. 2020
- "Erythrobacter westpacificensis" Wei et al. 2013
