= Altericroceibacterium =

Scientific classification
- Domain: Bacteria
- Kingdom: Pseudomonadati
- Phylum: Pseudomonadota
- Class: Alphaproteobacteria
- Order: Sphingomonadales
- Family: Erythrobacteraceae
- Genus: Altericroceibacterium; Xu et al. 2020

Species
- Altericroceibacterium endophyticum (Fidalgo et al. 2017) Xu et al. 2020; Altericroceibacterium indicum (Ramesh Kumar et al. 2008) Xu et al. 2020; Altericroceibacterium spongiae (Zhuang et al. 2019) Gao et al. 2021; Altericroceibacterium xinjiangense (Xue et al. 2012) Xu et al. 2020

Genus of bacterium

Altericroceibacterium is a genus of Gram-negative bacteria. The type species is Altericroceibacterium indicum.
