= Agromyces luteolus =

Scientific classification
- Domain: Bacteria
- Kingdom: Bacillati
- Phylum: Actinomycetota
- Class: Actinomycetia
- Order: Micrococcales
- Family: Microbacteriaceae
- Genus: Agromyces
- Species: A. luteolus

Binomial name
- Agromyces luteolus Takeuchi and Hatano 2001

Type strain
- IFO 16235, DSM 14595, IFO 16235, JCM 11431, NBRC 16235, VKM Ac-2085, strain 8

Species of bacterium

Agromyces luteolus is a bacterium from the genus of Agromyces which has been isolated from the rhizosphere and soil from the tree Sonneratia alba from Okinawa in Japan.
