= Citrimicrobium =

Scientific classification
- Domain: Bacteria
- Kingdom: Pseudomonadati
- Phylum: Pseudomonadota
- Class: Alphaproteobacteria
- Order: Sphingomonadales
- Family: Sphingomonadaceae
- Genus: Citrimicrobium; Jung et al. 2014
- Species: C. luteum

Binomial name
- Citrimicrobium luteum Jung et al. 2014

Genus of bacterium

Citrimicrobium is a Gram-negative, pleomorphic, and motile bacteria genus in the family Erythrobacteraceae, containing the single species Citrimicrobium luteum. The species has been isolated from the gut of the sea cucumber Stichopus japonicus from the Jeju Island in Korea.
