= Agromyces allii =

Scientific classification
- Domain: Bacteria
- Kingdom: Bacillati
- Phylum: Actinomycetota
- Class: Actinomycetia
- Order: Micrococcales
- Family: Microbacteriaceae
- Genus: Agromyces
- Species: A. allii

Binomial name
- Agromyces allii Jung et al. 2007

Species of bacterium

Agromyces allii is a Gram-positive and non-motile bacterium from the genus of Agromyces which has been isolated from the rhizosphere of the plant Allium victorialis var. platyphyllum from the Ulleung Island in Korea.
