= Alteraurantiacibacter =

Scientific classification
- Domain: Bacteria
- Kingdom: Pseudomonadati
- Phylum: Pseudomonadota
- Class: Alphaproteobacteria
- Order: Sphingomonadales
- Family: Erythrobacteraceae
- Genus: Alteraurantiacibacter; Xu et al. 2020

Species
- Alteraurantiacibacter aestuarii (Park et al. 2011) Xu et al. 2020; Alteraurantiacibacter aquimixticola (Park et al. 2019) et al. 2020; Alteraurantiacibacter buctensis (Zhang et al. 2016) Xu et al. 2020

Genus of bacteria

Alteraurantiacibacter is a genus of Gram-negative bacteria.
