= Agromyces indicus =

Scientific classification
- Domain: Bacteria
- Kingdom: Bacillati
- Phylum: Actinomycetota
- Class: Actinomycetia
- Order: Micrococcales
- Family: Microbacteriaceae
- Genus: Agromyces
- Species: A. indicus

Binomial name
- Agromyces indicus Dastager et al. 2012

Type strain
- NII-1018, NIO-1018, CCTCC AB 2011122, JCM 17573

Species of bacterium

Agromyces indicus is a Gram-positive, rod-shaped and non-motile bacterium from the genus of Agromyces which has been isolated from mangroves sediments from the Chorao Island in India.
