= Pontixanthobacter =

Scientific classification
- Domain: Bacteria
- Kingdom: Pseudomonadati
- Phylum: Pseudomonadota
- Class: Alphaproteobacteria
- Order: Sphingomonadales
- Family: Erythrobacteraceae
- Genus: Pontixanthobacter; Xu et al. 2020

Species
- Pontixanthobacter aestiaquae (Jung et al. 2014) Xu et al. 2020; Pontixanthobacter aquaemixtae (Park et al. 2017) Xu et al. 2020; Pontixanthobacter gangjinensis (Jeong et al. 2013) Xu et al. 2020; Pontixanthobacter luteolus (Yoon et al. 2005) Xu et al. 2020; Pontixanthobacter rizhaonensis Liu et al. 2021

Genus of bacterium

Pontixanthobacter is a genus of Gram-negative bacteria.
