= Aurantiacibacter =

Scientific classification
- Domain: Bacteria
- Kingdom: Pseudomonadati
- Phylum: Pseudomonadota
- Class: Alphaproteobacteria
- Order: Sphingomonadales
- Family: Erythrobacteraceae
- Genus: Aurantiacibacter; Xu et al. 2020

Species
- Aurantiacibacter aquimixticola (Park et al. 2017) Xu et al. 2020; Aurantiacibacter arachoides (Xing et al. 2017) Xu et al. 2020; Aurantiacibacter atlanticus (Zhuang et al. 2015) Xu et al. 2020; Aurantiacibacter gangjinensis (Lee et al. 2010) Xu et al. 2020; Aurantiacibacter luteus (Lei et al. 2015) Xu et al. 2020; Aurantiacibacter marinus (Jung et al. 2012) Xu et al. 2020; Aurantiacibacter odishensis (Subhash et al. 2013) Xu et al. 2020; Aurantiacibacter rhizosphaerae Lee and Kim 2020; Aurantiacibacter spongiae (Zhuang et al. 2019) Xu et al. 2020; Aurantiacibacter suaedae (Lee et al. 2019) Lee and Kim 2020; Aurantiacibacter xanthus (Li et al. 2017) Xu et al. 2020; Aurantiacibacter zhengii (Fang et al. 2019) Xu et al. 2020

Genus of bacterium

Aurantiacibacter is a genus of Gram-negative bacteria.
