= Agromyces humatus =

Scientific classification
- Domain: Bacteria
- Kingdom: Bacillati
- Phylum: Actinomycetota
- Class: Actinomycetia
- Order: Micrococcales
- Family: Microbacteriaceae
- Genus: Agromyces
- Species: A. humatus

Binomial name
- Agromyces humatus Jurado et al. 2005

Type strain
- DSM 16389, HKI 0327, JCM 14319, NCIMB 14012, strain CD5

Species of bacterium

Agromyces humatus is a Gram-positive, aerobic and non-motile bacterium from the genus of Agromyces which has been isolated from a wall of a tomb from the Catacombs of Domitilla in Italy.
