= Agromyces albus =

Scientific classification
- Domain: Bacteria
- Kingdom: Bacillati
- Phylum: Actinomycetota
- Class: Actinomycetia
- Order: Micrococcales
- Family: Microbacteriaceae
- Genus: Agromyces
- Species: A. albus

Binomial name
- Agromyces albus Dorofeeva et al. 2003

Type strain
- JCM 13565, NBRC 103057, UCM Ac-623, VKM Ac-1800

Species of bacterium

Agromyces albus is a bacterium from the genus of Agromyces which has been isolated from the plant Androsace.
