= Agromyces binzhouensis =

Scientific classification
- Domain: Bacteria
- Kingdom: Bacillati
- Phylum: Actinomycetota
- Class: Actinomycetia
- Order: Micrococcales
- Family: Microbacteriaceae
- Genus: Agromyces
- Species: A. binzhouensis

Binomial name
- Agromyces binzhouensis Chen et al. 2016

Species of bacterium

Agromyces binzhouensis is a Gram-positive, heterotrophic, non-spore-forming and rod-shaped bacterium from the genus of Agromyces which has been isolated from soil from the Yellow River delta from Binzhou in China.
