= Agromyces bauzanensis =

Scientific classification
- Domain: Bacteria
- Kingdom: Bacillati
- Phylum: Actinomycetota
- Class: Actinomycetia
- Order: Micrococcales
- Family: Microbacteriaceae
- Genus: Agromyces
- Species: A. bauzanensis

Binomial name
- Agromyces bauzanensis Zhang et al. 2010

Type strain
- BZ41, CGMCC 1.8984, DSM 22275

Species of bacterium

Agromyces bauzanensis is a Gram-negative and aerobic bacterium from the genus of Agromyces which has been isolated from hydrocarbon-contaminated soil from Bozen in Italy.
