= Agromyces =

Scientific classification
- Domain: Bacteria
- Kingdom: Bacillati
- Phylum: Actinomycetota
- Class: Actinomycetes
- Order: Micrococcales
- Family: Microbacteriaceae
- Genus: Agromyces; Gledhill and Casida 1969 (Approved Lists 1980)

Type species
- Agromyces ramosus

Species
- See text.

Genus of bacteria

Agromyces is a genus in the phylum Actinomycetota (Bacteria).

== Etymology ==
The name Agromyces derives from:
Greek noun agros, field or soil; Neo-Latin masculine gender noun myces (from Greek masculine gender noun mukēs -etis), fungus; Neo-Latin masculine gender noun Agromyces, soil fungus.

== Species ==
The genus contains 31 species, namely

- A. albus ( Dorofeeva et al. 2003; Latin masculine gender adjective albus, white, referring to the white colour of colonies.)
- A. allii ( Jung et al. 2007,;: Neo-Latin genitive case noun allii, of Allium, referring to the source of isolation of the micro-organisms, the rhizosphere of Allium victorialis var. platyphyllum.)
- A. atrinae ( Park et al. 2010; Neo-Latin noun Atrina, zoological name for a genus of bivalve mollusc; Neo-Latin genitive case noun atrinae, of Atrina, referring to the isolation of the type strain from a fermented food prepared from Atrina pectinata (comb pen shell).)
- A. aurantiacus ( Li et al. 2003; Neo-Latin masculine gender adjective aurantiacus, orange-coloured.)
- A. aureus ( Corretto et al. 2016 )
- A. bauzanensis ( Zhang et al. 2010; Medieval Latin masculine gender adjective bauzanensis, of or belonging to Bauzanum, the medieval Latin name of Bozen/Bolzano, a city in South Tyrol, Italy, from where the type strain was isolated.)
- A. binzhouensis ( Chen et al. 2016 )
- A. bracchium ( Takeuchi and Hatano 2001; Latin noun brachium (nominative in apposition), a branch of a tree, a twig, referring to the twig-like morphology.)
- A. cerinus ( Zgurskaya et al. 1992; Latin masculine gender adjective cerinus, waxcolored, yellow like wax.)
- A. flavus ( Chen et al. 2011 )
- A. fucosus ( Zgurskaya et al. 1992; Neo-Latin noun fucosum, fucose; Neo-Latin masculine gender adjective fucosus (sic), containing fucose in the cell wall.)
- A. hippuratus ( (Zgurskaya et al. 1992) Ortiz-Martinez et al. 2004; Neo-Latin masculine gender adjective hippuratus, pertaining to hippurate, relating to the ability to decompose hippurate.)
- A. humatus ( Jurado et al. 2005; Latin masculine gender participle adjective humatus, buried.)
- A. indicus ( Dastager et al. 2012 )
- A. insulae ( Huang et al. 2016 )
- A. iriomotensis ( Hamada et al. 2014 )
- A. italicus ( Jurado et al. 2005; Latin masculine gender adjective italicus, of or pertaining to Italy, of Italy, the origin of the type strain.)
- A. lapidis ( Jurado et al. 2005; Latin noun lapis -idis, a stone; Latin genitive case noun lapidis, of a stone.)
- A. luteolus ( Takeuchi and Hatano 2001; Latin dim. masculine gender adjective luteolus, yellowish.)
- A. marinus ( Hamada et al. 2015 )
- A. mediolanus ( (ex Mamoli 1939) Suzuki et al. 1996, nom. rev.; Neo-Latin masculine gender adjective mediolanus (sic), of or belonging Mediolanum, the old name of Milan, Italy.)
- A. neolithicus ( Jurado et al. 2005; Neo-Latin masculine gender adjective neolithicus, Neolithic, referring to the origin of the Neolithic paintings in Grotta dei Cervi, the source of the soil from which the organism was isolated.)
- A. ramosus ( Gledhill and Casida 1969, species. (Type species of the genus).; Latin masculine gender adjective ramosus, having many branches, much-branched.)
- A. rhizospherae ( Takeuchi and Hatano 2001; Neo-Latin rhiza, root; Greek noun sphaira, sphere; Neo-Latin genitive case noun rhizospherae, of the sphere of the root.)
- A. salentinus ( Jurado et al. 2005; Neo-Latin masculine gender adjective salentinus, of or pertaining to Salentine Peninsula, the location of Grotta dei Cervi, the area from which the organism was isolated.)
- A. soli ( Lee et al. 2011 )
- A. subbeticus ( Jurado et al. 2005; Neo-Latin masculine gender adjective subbeticus, of or belonging to the Subbetic Mountain Range, southern Spain, where the Cave of Bats is located.)
- A. subtropicus ( Hamada et al. 2014 )
- A. terreus ( Yoon et al. 2008; Latin masculine gender adjective terreus, of the earth.)
- A. tropicus ( Thawai et al. 2011; Latin masculine gender adjective tropicus, tropical, of or pertaining to the tropic(s), relating to isolation from a tropical forest.)
- A. ulmi ( Rivas et al. 2004; Latin genitive case noun ulmi, of the elm tree, referring to the isolation source of this micro-organism.)

== See also ==
- Bacterial taxonomy
- Microbiology
