= Agromyces soli =

Scientific classification
- Domain: Bacteria
- Kingdom: Bacillati
- Phylum: Actinomycetota
- Class: Actinomycetia
- Order: Micrococcales
- Family: Microbacteriaceae
- Genus: Agromyces
- Species: A. soli

Binomial name
- Agromyces soli Lee et al. 2011

Species of bacterium

Agromyces soli is a Gram-negative and non-motile bacterium from the genus of Agromyces which has been isolated from farm soil from Korea.
