= Agromyces terreus =

Scientific classification
- Domain: Bacteria
- Kingdom: Bacillati
- Phylum: Actinomycetota
- Class: Actinomycetia
- Order: Micrococcales
- Family: Microbacteriaceae
- Genus: Agromyces
- Species: A. terreus

Binomial name
- Agromyces terreus Yoon et al. 2008

Type strain
- JCM 14581, KCTC 19216, strain DS-10

Species of bacterium

Agromyces terreus is a Gram-positive and non-motile bacterium from the genus of Agromyces which has been isolated from soil from Dokdo in Korea.
