= Agromyces aurantiacus =

Scientific classification
- Domain: Bacteria
- Kingdom: Bacillati
- Phylum: Actinomycetota
- Class: Actinomycetia
- Order: Micrococcales
- Family: Microbacteriaceae
- Genus: Agromyces
- Species: A. aurantiacus

Binomial name
- Agromyces aurantiacus Li et al. 2003

Type strain
- AS 4.1717, CCTCC 001012, DSM 14598, JCM 12113, YIM 21741

Synonyms
- Agromyces bannaensis

Species of bacterium

Agromyces aurantiacus is a bacterium from the genus of Agromyces which has been isolated from primeval forest soil from Xishuangbanna in China.
