= Erythrobacter dokdonensis =

Scientific classification
- Domain: Bacteria
- Kingdom: Pseudomonadati
- Phylum: Pseudomonadota
- Class: Alphaproteobacteria
- Order: Sphingomonadales
- Family: Erythrobacteraceae
- Genus: Erythrobacter
- Species: E. dokdonensis

Binomial name
- Erythrobacter dokdonensis (Yoon et al. 2006) Xu et al. 2020

Type strain
- DSM 17193, DSW-74, KCTC 12395

Synonyms
- Porphyrobacter dokdonensis Yoon et al. 2006

Species of bacterium

Erythrobacter dokdonensis is a Gram-negative, non-spore-forming, slightly halophilic and non-motile bacteria from the genus Erythrobacter which has been isolated from sea water in Dokdo in Korea.
