= Agromyces atrinae =

Scientific classification
- Domain: Bacteria
- Kingdom: Bacillati
- Phylum: Actinomycetota
- Class: Actinomycetia
- Order: Micrococcales
- Family: Microbacteriaceae
- Genus: Agromyces
- Species: A. atrinae

Binomial name
- Agromyces atrinae Park et al. 2010

Type strain
- JCM 15913, KCTC 19593, strain P27

Species of bacterium

Agromyces atrinae is a Gram-positive, aerobic and non-motile bacterium from the genus of Agromyces which has been isolated from fermented seafood from Korea.
