= Parapontixanthobacter aurantiacus =

Scientific classification
- Domain: Bacteria
- Phylum: Pseudomonadota
- Class: Alphaproteobacteria
- Order: Sphingomonadales
- Family: Erythrobacteraceae
- Genus: Parapontixanthobacter Xu et al. 2020
- Species: P. aurantiacus

Binomial name
- Parapontixanthobacter aurantiacus (Zhang et al. 2016) Xu et al. 2020

Type strain
- CGMCC 1.12762, JCM 19853, LMG 28110, MCCC 1A09962, strain O30

Synonyms
- Altererythrobacter aurantiacus Zhang et al. 2016

Species of bacterium

Parapontixanthobacter aurantiacus is a Gram-negative and aerobic bacterium from the genus Parapontixanthobacter which has been isolated from deep-sea sediments from the Pacific Ocean.
