= Deer Cave (Otranto) =

Cave and archaeological site in southern Italy

- Grotta dei Cervi (Italian)
- Grotta di Enea
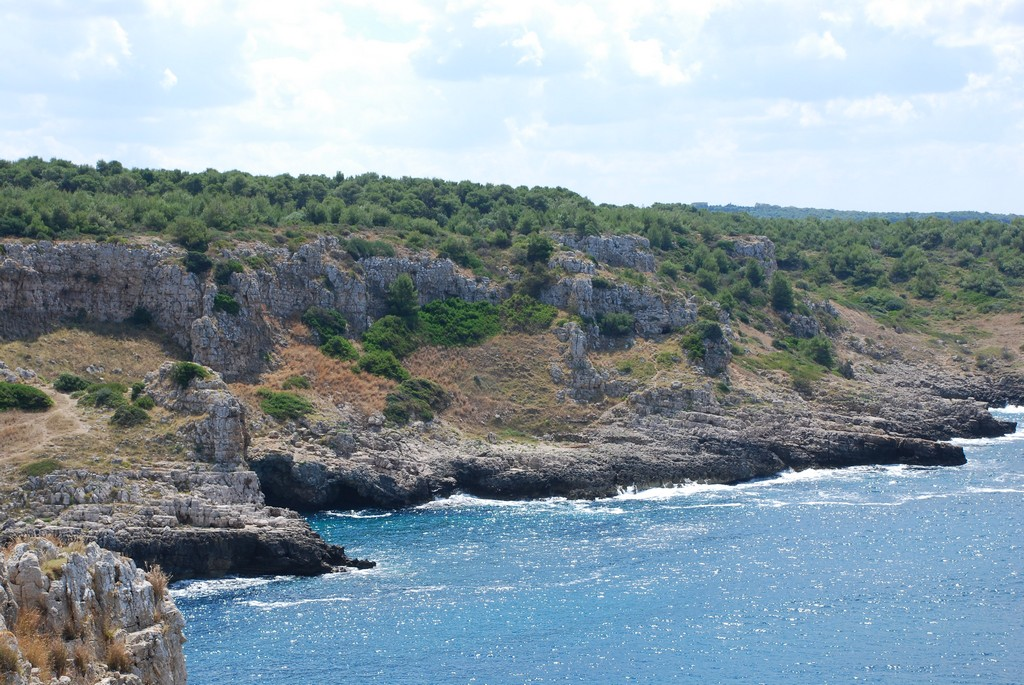
- Salento coastal Karst formations

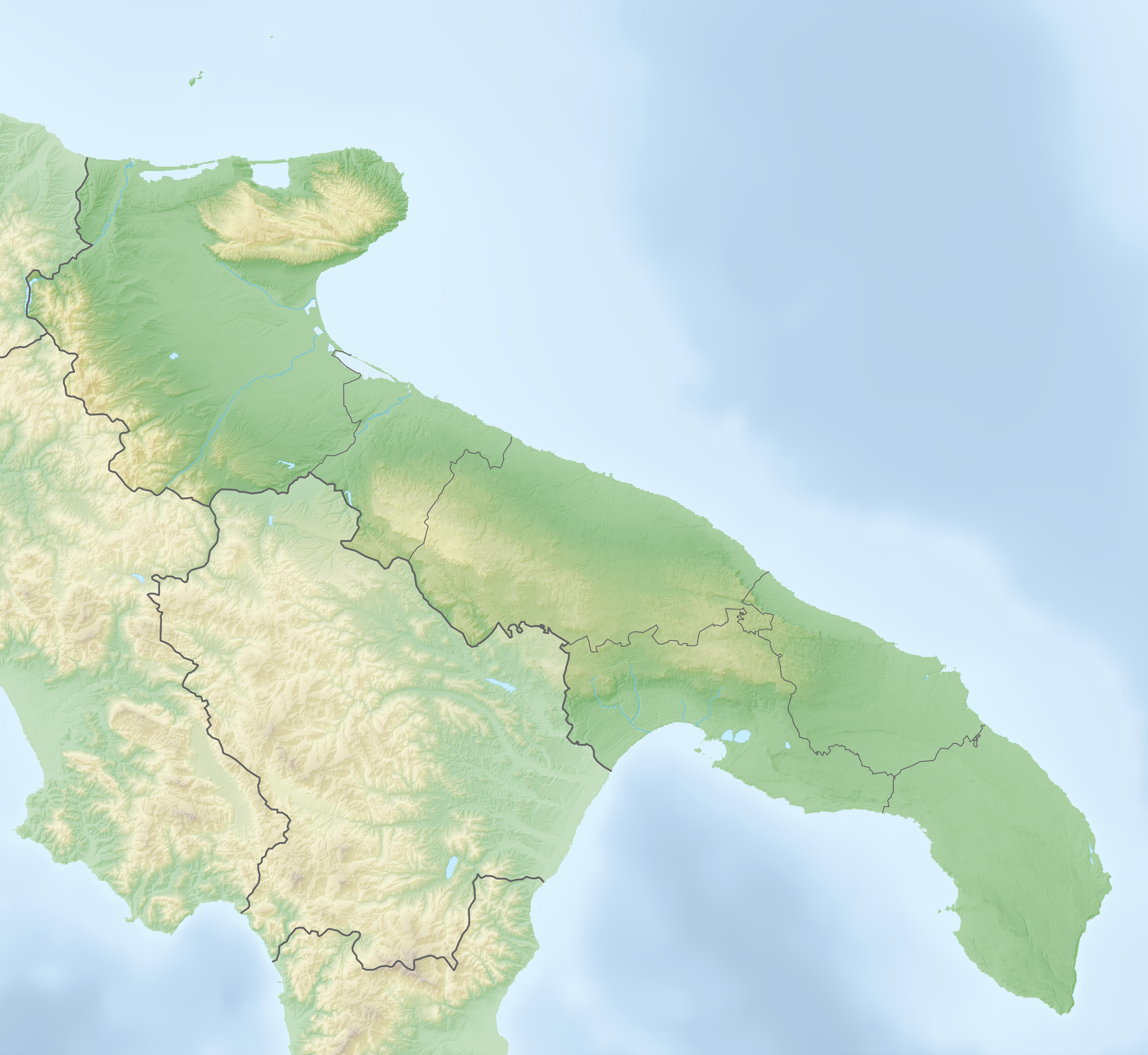
- location in Italy Deer Cave (Otranto) (Italy)
- 40°04′58″N 18°29′06″E
- Type: limestone karst cave complex
- Periods: late Neolithic, Eneolithic, 6000 to 5000 years BP
- Associated with: prehistoric settlers
- Location: near Porto Badisco, Otranto Comune
- Region: Province of Lecce, Apulia, Italy
- Part of: Peninsula Salentina

Site notes
- Length: 1,500 m (4,900 ft)
- Excavation dates: 1970
- Archaeologists: Paolo Graziosi
- Management: University of Salento
- Public access: no

The Deer Cave (Italian: Grotta dei Cervi - literally: Grotto of the stags) is a natural cave at the Salento coast near the town of Porto Badisco, around 8 km (5.0 mi) south of Otranto in Apulia, Italy. Unknown before 1970, it came to immediate international attention after the discovery of its impressive, innovative and enigmatic complex galleries of prehistoric parietal wall paintings.

This complex of caves was discovered during an ongoing routine exploration of the local territory on February 1, 1970 by a team (Note: The team of discoverers: Severino Albertini, Enzo Evangelisti, Isidoro Mattioli, Remo Mazzotta, Daniele Rizzo) of speleologists of the Salento Speleological Group "Pasquale de Laurentiis" from Maglie. It was initially named Cave of Aeneas (Grotta di Enea) in reference to Virgil's Aeneid in which the Trojan hero Aeneas first landed in Italy precisely in Porto Badisco. The current name alludes to the omnipresence and significance of deer depictions among the cave's galleries. The location was soon closed to the public in order to ensure that the original environmental conditions essential for the conservation of the paintings are not disrupted. Access to the cave remains restricted to authorized personnel and researchers only.

== Overview ==
The Grotta dei Cervi, the Grotta Romanelli and the Grotta delle Veneri are all located in the coastal Karst formations on the Salento peninsula in southern Apulia. Deemed to constitute a notable local cultural continuity of Paleolithic and Neolithic human occupation, the Ministry of Cultural Heritage and Activities of Apulia formally submitted for the induction into the World Heritage List in 2006 and has received UNESCO's official notice and recognition as Karstic caves in prehistoric Apulia.

Grotta dei Cervi is situated on the flank of a small valley opening to Porto Badisco. Exploration of the site is incomplete, however there are two entries and three main corridors (halls, galleries) with a combined length of more than 1,500 m (4,900 ft). Hundreds of paintings and an estimated 3000 individual pictograms, executed in black (bat guano) and red (ochre) paint, are concentrated in groups in three galleries over a total distance of 600 m (2,000 ft) along the "wavy, milk colored" limestone walls.

The first corridor is about 200 m (660 ft) long and splits into two branches. At the northern end of one of these, two human skeletons with heads missing were found. The second corridor is rich in paintings and can be accessed by a tunnel passage via the first corridor. This corridor widens towards the end with access to two successive rooms. In the middle of the corridor a pond has formed fed by dripping water. The section was used as a deposit or storage site for bat guano, collected exclusively from inside the cave complex. The third corridor is also around 200 m (660 ft) long and its interior is accessible via the second hall through a very low opening.

Two novel species of Agromyces bacteria, Agromyces salentinus and Agromyces neolithicus, were identified from soil samples taken from outside and inside the cave, respectively.

== 3D documentation ==
In response to the pending problem of public access restriction to the site the Lecce provincial government approved the "Memorandum of Understanding for the creation and processing of three-dimensional virtual image reconstruction of the prehistoric paintings of the Cave of Porto Badisco and other related activities". A joint team of the National Research Council Canada and the University of Salento was granted access and has produced a 3D documentation of the cave's interior. Two sets of high resolution and detailed three-dimensional acquisitions, along with two-dimensional images, were captured in 2005 and 2009 respectively. More than 100 gigabytes of data were collected - including 35 GB of data on the 3D structure and 65 digital photographs. A high resolution 3D virtual tour is commercially available on DVD.

== Interpretation ==
Grotta dei Cervi pictogram, (edited)

Critical statements have amounted to a near total consensus on the high degree of cultural and historical significance and the exceptional artistic quality of the cave's art. However, Paolo Graziosi's work The prehistoric paintings in the caves of Porto Badisco (1980) remains the only scientific on-site documentation of the paintings. Only very few conclusive interpretations that substantiate claims of historical significance are publicly available. Galleries and blogs of the cave's images where amateurs engage in informal interpretation can be found on the internet. One of the most famous commented pictographs is the "dancing God", or possibly a dancing sorcerer.

=== Publications ===
Maria Laura Leone's line of interpretation of the cave's artwork (with reference to Paolo Graziosi's 1980 monograph) in her 2009 publication: The Phosphenic Deer Cave of Badisco - Art and Myth of the Shadows in Depth (abridged version): Direct Link

Leone suggests that the regularly recurring "deer" and hunting scenes represent some kind of "creation myth". The hunter accompanied by dogs was identified as a leitmotif and an epic analogy of "a mythic ancestor". Notable according to Leone is "the artist's simplifying deductive method by which he very capable and effectively records the complex visionary experience." Presentation of Neolithic art was indeed commanded by pictorial syntax and universal prehistoric cultural visual ideas.

Elettra Ingravallo offers an alternative approach towards an interpretation in her publication: The Grotta Dei Cervi (Otranto - Lecce).

Elettra Ingravallo argues in close proximity to and support of Aby Warburg's concept of "Survival". An interpretation based on images is here fruitless, as the motives and the actual abstract process of the visual act is too much under the control of subconscious impulses and instincts. She emphasizes that the incomplete knowledge of prehistoric societies and heterogeneous information on social and political organisation provides only a vague understanding of the true nature and correlation of power inside the Neolithic communities. It is not inappropriate, she writes to remind that difficulties remain for interpretations of the immaterial world of prehistory and its unexpressed concepts.

The paintings of the Grotta dei Cervi are attributed to the late Neolithic that makes them 20,000 years more recent than most well known Paleolithic cave paintings, such as Lascaux and Altamira. Mediterranean societies of the late Neolithic era had begun to engage in community organisation and planning (Printed ceramics industry, farming, towns, religion) and individuals pursued the first specialized traits. The authors of these paintings had to be individuals invested with special functions, artist-shamans or in some way related to them. The artwork composition, implementation, thorough planning and conceptual thinking suggests that these Neolithic artisans belonged to the greater European, Mediterranean, Trans-Alpine pan-culture, "that lived at the margins of agriculture", endowed with a common set of ideas and an inherit understanding of surreal and metaphoric concepts.
