= Agromyces bracchium =

Scientific classification
- Domain: Bacteria
- Kingdom: Bacillati
- Phylum: Actinomycetota
- Class: Actinomycetia
- Order: Micrococcales
- Family: Microbacteriaceae
- Genus: Agromyces
- Species: A. bracchium

Binomial name
- Agromyces bracchium Takeuchi and Hatano 2001

Type strain
- IFO 16238, DSM 14596, JCM 11433, NBRC 16238, VKM Ac-2088

Species of bacterium

Agromyces bracchium is a bacterium from the genus of Agromyces which has been isolated from rhizospheric soil from the tree Bruguiera gymnorhiza from Okinawa in Japan.
