= Agromyces iriomotensis =

Scientific classification
- Domain: Bacteria
- Kingdom: Bacillati
- Phylum: Actinomycetota
- Class: Actinomycetia
- Order: Micrococcales
- Family: Microbacteriaceae
- Genus: Agromyces
- Species: A. iriomotensis

Binomial name
- Agromyces iriomotensis Hamada et al. 2014

Type strain
- DSM 26155, NBRC 106452, IY07-20

Species of bacterium

Agromyces iriomotensis is a Gram-negative bacterium from the genus of Agromyces which has been isolated from soil from a pineapple field from Okinawa in Japan.
