= Caenibius =

Scientific classification
- Domain: Bacteria
- Kingdom: Pseudomonadati
- Phylum: Pseudomonadota
- Class: Alphaproteobacteria
- Order: Sphingomonadales
- Family: Erythrobacteraceae
- Genus: Caenibius; Hördt et al. 2020

Species
- Caenibius estronivorus (Qin et al. 2021) Wang et al. 2025; Caenibius tardaugens (Fujii et al. 2003) Hördt et al. 2020

Genus of bacteria

Caenibius is a genus of bacteria in the family Erythrobacteraceae.
