= Tsuneonella =

Scientific classification
- Domain: Bacteria
- Kingdom: Pseudomonadati
- Phylum: Pseudomonadota
- Class: Alphaproteobacteria
- Order: Sphingomonadales
- Family: Erythrobacteraceae
- Genus: Tsuneonella; Xu et al. 2020

Species
- Tsuneonella aeria (Xue et al. 2016) Xu et al. 2020; Tsuneonella amylolytica (Qu et al. 2019) Xu et al. 2020; Tsuneonella dongtanensis (Fan et al. 2011) Xu et al. 2020; Tsuneonella flava (Ma et al. 2018) Xu et al. 2020; Tsuneonella mangrovi (Liao et al. 2017) Xu et al. 2020; Tsuneonella rigui (Kang et al. 2016) Xu et al. 2020; Tsuneonella suprasediminis Gao et al. 2021; Tsuneonella troitsensis (Nedashkovskaya et al. 2013) Xu et al. 2020

Genus of bacterium

Tsuneonella is a genus of Gram-negative bacteria.
