= Alteriqipengyuania lutimaris =

Scientific classification
- Domain: Bacteria
- Kingdom: Pseudomonadati
- Phylum: Pseudomonadota
- Class: Alphaproteobacteria
- Order: Sphingomonadales
- Family: Sphingomonadaceae
- Genus: Alteriqipengyuania
- Species: A. lutimaris

Binomial name
- Alteriqipengyuania lutimaris (Jung et al. 2014) Xu et al. 2020

Type strain
- CECT 8624, S-5, KCTC 42109

Synonyms
- Erythrobacter lutimarinus [sic]; Erythrobacter lutimaris Jung et al. 2014

Species of bacterium

Alteriqipengyuania lutimaris is a Gram-negative, oval-shaped and non-motile bacteria from the genus Alteriqipengyuania which has been isolated from tidal flat sediment from the Yellow Sea in Korea.
