= Alteripontixanthobacter =

Scientific classification
- Domain: Bacteria
- Kingdom: Pseudomonadati
- Phylum: Pseudomonadota
- Class: Alphaproteobacteria
- Order: Sphingomonadales
- Family: Erythrobacteraceae
- Genus: Alteripontixanthobacter; Xu et al. 2020

Type species
- Alteripontixanthobacter maritimus

Species
- A. maritimus; A. muriae

Genus of bacterium

Alteripontixanthobacter is a genus of bacteria from the family of Erythrobacteraceae.
