= Agromyces aureus =

Scientific classification
- Domain: Bacteria
- Kingdom: Bacillati
- Phylum: Actinomycetota
- Class: Actinomycetia
- Order: Micrococcales
- Family: Microbacteriaceae
- Genus: Agromyces
- Species: A. aureus

Binomial name
- Agromyces aureus Corretto et al. 2016

Type strain
- AR33, DSM 101731, LMG 29235

Species of bacterium

Agromyces aureus is a Gram-Positive, rod-shaped and motile bacterium from the genus of Agromyces which has been isolated from the rhizosphere of the tree Salix caprea from Arnoldstein in Austria.
