= Paraurantiacibacter =

Scientific classification
- Domain: Bacteria
- Kingdom: Pseudomonadati
- Phylum: Pseudomonadota
- Class: Alphaproteobacteria
- Order: Sphingomonadales
- Family: Erythrobacteraceae
- Genus: Paraurantiacibacter; Xu et al. 2020
- Species: P. namhicola

Binomial name
- Paraurantiacibacter namhicola (Park et al. 2011) Xu et al. 2020

Type strain
- JCM 16345, KCTC 22736, KYW48

Synonyms
- Aquamonas marinus; Altererythrobacter namhicola Park et al. 2011

Genus of bacteria

Paraurantiacibacter namhicola is a Gram-negative, aerobic and non-motile bacterium which has been isolated from seawater from the South Sea in Korea. It is the only species in the genus Paraurantiacibacter.
