= Croceibacterium =

Scientific classification
- Domain: Bacteria
- Kingdom: Pseudomonadati
- Phylum: Pseudomonadota
- Class: Alphaproteobacteria
- Order: Sphingomonadales
- Family: Erythrobacteraceae
- Genus: Croceibacterium; Liu et al. 2019

Species
- Croceibacterium atlanticum (Wu et al. 2014) Xu et al. 2020; Croceibacterium ferulae Liu et al. 2019; Croceibacterium mercuriale (Coil et al. 2016) Liu et al. 2019; Croceibacterium salegens (Liang et al. 2017) Xu et al. 2020; Croceibacterium soli (Zhao et al. 2017) Xu et al. 2020; Croceibacterium xixiisoli (Yuan et al. 2017) Xu et al. 2020

Genus of bacterium

Croceibacterium is a genus of Gram-negative bacteria.
