= Tsuneonella flava =

Scientific classification
- Domain: Bacteria
- Kingdom: Pseudomonadati
- Phylum: Pseudomonadota
- Class: Alphaproteobacteria
- Order: Sphingomonadales
- Family: Erythrobacteraceae
- Genus: Tsuneonella
- Species: T. flava

Binomial name
- Tsuneonella flava (Ma et al. 2018) Xu et al. 2020

Type strain
- MCCC 1K02683, NBRC 112977, MS1-4

Synonyms
- Altererythrobacter flavus Ma et al. 2018

Species of bacterium

Tsuneonella flava is a Gram-negative, aerobic, rod-shaped and non-motile bacterium from the genus Tsuneonella which has been isolated from isolated from mangrove sediments from the Jiulong River in China.
