= Pseudopontixanthobacter =

Scientific classification
- Domain: Bacteria
- Kingdom: Pseudomonadati
- Phylum: Pseudomonadota
- Class: Alphaproteobacteria
- Order: Sphingomonadales
- Family: Erythrobacteraceae
- Genus: Pseudopontixanthobacter; Sun et al. 2020

Species
- Pseudopontixanthobacter confluentis (Park et al. 2016) Liu et al. 2021; Pseudopontixanthobacter sediminis (Kim et al. 2016) Liu et al. 2021; Pseudopontixanthobacter vadosimaris Sun et al. 2020

Genus of bacterium

Pseudopontixanthobacter is a genus of Gram-negative bacteria.
