= Agromyces tropicus =

Scientific classification
- Domain: Bacteria
- Kingdom: Bacillati
- Phylum: Actinomycetota
- Class: Actinomycetia
- Order: Micrococcales
- Family: Microbacteriaceae
- Genus: Agromyces
- Species: A. tropicus

Binomial name
- Agromyces tropicus Thawai et al. 2011

Type strain
- AK2-48, CM9-9, BCC 34764, JCM 15672

Synonyms
- Agromyces tropica

Species of bacterium

Agromyces tropicus is a bacterium from the genus of Agromyces which has been isolated from soil from the Chiang Mai Province in Thailand.
