= Agromyces marinus =

Scientific classification
- Domain: Bacteria
- Kingdom: Bacillati
- Phylum: Actinomycetota
- Class: Actinomycetia
- Order: Micrococcales
- Family: Microbacteriaceae
- Genus: Agromyces
- Species: A. marinus

Binomial name
- Agromyces marinus Hamada et al. 2015

Type strain
- H23-19, H23-8, DSM 26151, NBRC 109019

Species of bacterium

Agromyces marinus is a Gram-negative bacterium from the genus of Agromyces which has been isolated from marine sediments from the beach of Kamogawa in Japan.
