= Parerythrobacter =

Scientific classification
- Domain: Bacteria
- Kingdom: Pseudomonadati
- Phylum: Pseudomonadota
- Class: Alphaproteobacteria
- Order: Sphingomonadales
- Family: Erythrobacteraceae
- Genus: Parerythrobacter; Xu et al. 2020

Species
- P. jejuensis (Yoon et al. 2013) Xu et al. 2020; P. lutipelagi (Lee 2019) Xu et al. 2020

Genus of bacteria

Parerythrobacter is a genus of Gram-negative bacteria.
