= Cueva de los Murciélagos =

Cave and archaeological site in Spain

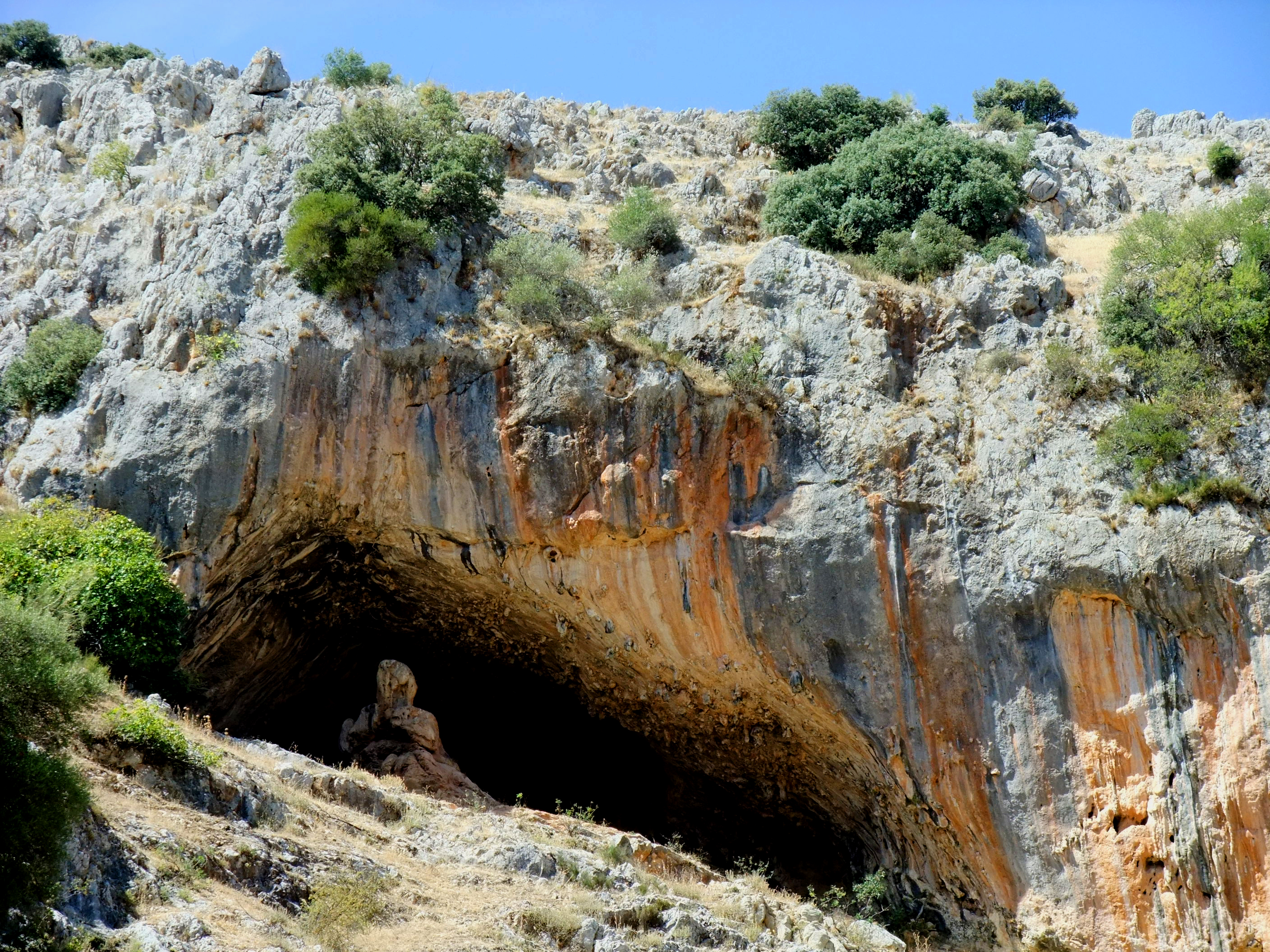
- Interactive map of Cueva de los Murciélagos
- Location: Zuheros, Andalusia, Spain
- Coordinates: 37°32′31″N 4°18′15″W
- Length: 2,000 m
- Discovery: 1868
- Geology: Dripstone cave

The Cueva de los Murciélagos is a cave system in the Sierras Subbéticas located about 4 km southeast of the town of Zuheros in the southern province of Córdoba in Spain. Although the caves were discovered in 1868, they were not studied until 1938. The caves host one of the largest bat colonies in Andalusia.

== Location and formation ==
The caves are located in an extensive karst landscape at an altitude of 980 metres in the heart of the Cañada de Malos Vientos mountain (1000 m) in southern Andalusia. The rock formations and caves with stalactites, stalagmites and subterranean lakes were formed due to weathering and leaching of carbonate rocks. The caves have a total length of 2,000 metres, of which only 450 metres can be accessed.

== History ==
Speleologists discovered tombs from the Middle Paleolithic period, which show evidence of human occupation of the caves 35,000 years ago. According to the Carbon-14 dating method, finds from the Neolithic period have an age from 4,900 to 3,980 BC. In 2023 the redating of baskets and shoes suggested that the age of the items was approximately 9,500 years old.

The researchers reconstructed the lives of people whose artefacts were found preferentially at the cave entrance. Here they cooked their meals on an open firepit. Their diet consisted of the meat of wild and farm animals and various cereals. They used tools created of flint and bones, in order to cut leather. They manufactured red painted vessels, as well as necklaces and bracelets made of seashells, which they probably acquired through trade with coastal residents. Apparently, the group was transitioning from living as hunter-gatherers to living as farmers, who cultivated crops and bred domestic animals.

On various walls there are cave paintings which show depictions of goats, an eye, and several human figures. The drawings date from the Neolithic period (6000-3000 BC) and the Bronze Age (3000-2000 BC).
