= Agromyces neolithicus =

Scientific classification
- Domain: Bacteria
- Kingdom: Bacillati
- Phylum: Actinomycetota
- Class: Actinomycetia
- Order: Micrococcales
- Family: Microbacteriaceae
- Genus: Agromyces
- Species: A. neolithicus

Binomial name
- Agromyces neolithicus Jurado et al. 2005

Type strain
- DSM 16197, HKI 0321, JCM 14322, NCIMB 13990, strain 23-23

Synonyms
- Agromyces neoliticus

Species of bacterium

Agromyces neolithicus is a Gram-negative bacterium from the genus of Agromyces which has been isolated from soil from the Porto Badisco in Italy.
