= Agromyces flavus =

Scientific classification
- Domain: Bacteria
- Kingdom: Bacillati
- Phylum: Actinomycetota
- Class: Actinomycetia
- Order: Micrococcales
- Family: Microbacteriaceae
- Genus: Agromyces
- Species: A. flavus

Binomial name
- Agromyces flavus Chen et al. 2011

Type strain
- CCM 7623, CPCC 202695, KCTC 19578

Species of bacterium

Agromyces flavus is a Gram-positive, aerobic and non-motile bacterium from the genus of Agromyces which has been isolated from soil from the Tibetan Plateau in China.
