= Altererythrobacter =

Scientific classification
- Domain: Bacteria
- Kingdom: Pseudomonadati
- Phylum: Pseudomonadota
- Class: Alphaproteobacteria
- Order: Sphingomonadales
- Family: Erythrobacteraceae
- Genus: Altererythrobacter; Kwon et al. 2007

Type species
- Altererythrobacter epoxidivorans Kwon et al. 2007

Species
- See text

Synonyms
- "Alterierythrobacter" [sic]; "Osterythrobacter"

Genus of bacteria

Altererythrobacter is a bacterial genus from the family Erythrobacteraceae.

== Species ==
=== Accepted species ===
Altererythrobacter comprises the following species:

- Altererythrobacter aquiaggeris Jung et al. 2017
- Altererythrobacter deserti Yan et al. 2017
- Altererythrobacter epoxidivorans Kwon et al. 2007
- Altererythrobacter estronivorus Qin et al. 2021
- Altererythrobacter fulvus Dahal and Kim 2018
- Altererythrobacter insulae Park et al. 2019
- Altererythrobacter ishigakiensis Matsumoto et al. 2011
- Altererythrobacter lauratis Yuan et al. 2017
- Altererythrobacter muriae Azpiazu-Muniozguren et al. 2021
- Altererythrobacter palmitatis Yuan et al. 2017
- Altererythrobacter rigui Kang et al. 2016
- Altererythrobacter rubellus Yoon and Ryu 2020
- Altererythrobacter xiamenensis Lei et al. 2014

=== Provisional species ===
The following species names have been published, but not validated according to the Bacteriological Code:

- "Altererythrobacter flava" Zhang et al. 2021
- "Altererythrobacter segetis" Lee and Whang 2021
- "Altererythrobacter terrae" Srinivasan et al. 2016
