= Alteriqipengyuania =

Scientific classification
- Domain: Bacteria
- Kingdom: Pseudomonadati
- Phylum: Pseudomonadota
- Class: Alphaproteobacteria
- Order: Sphingomonadales
- Family: Sphingomonadaceae
- Genus: Alteriqipengyuania; Xu et al. 2020

Species
- Alteriqipengyuania halimionae (Fidalgo et al. 2017) Xu et al. 2020; Alteriqipengyuania lutimaris (Jung et al. 2014) Xu et al. 2020

Genus of bacterium

Alteriqipengyuania is a genus of Gram-negative bacteria.
