= Qipengyuania =

Scientific classification
- Domain: Bacteria
- Kingdom: Pseudomonadati
- Phylum: Pseudomonadota
- Class: Alphaproteobacteria
- Order: Sphingomonadales
- Family: Erythrobacteraceae
- Genus: Qipengyuania; Feng et al. 2015

Species
- Qipengyuania algicida (Kristyanto et al. 2017) Xu et al. 2020; Qipengyuania aquimaris (Yoon et al. 2004) Xu et al. 2020; Qipengyuania citrea (Denner et al. 2002) Xu et al. 2020; Qipengyuania flava (Yoon et al. 2003) Lee and Kim 2020; Qipengyuania gaetbuli (Yoon et al. 2005) Xu et al. 2020; Qipengyuania marisflavi (Park et al. 2019) Xu et al. 2020; Qipengyuania nanhaisediminis (Xu et al. 2010) Xu et al. 2020; Qipengyuania oceanensis (Yang et al. 2015) Xu et al. 2020; Qipengyuania pelagi (Wu et al. 2012) Xu et al. 2020; Qipengyuania sediminis Feng et al. 2015; Qipengyuania seohaensis (Yoon et al. 2005) Xu et al. 2020; Qipengyuania vulgaris (Ivanova et al. 2006) Xu et al. 2020

Genus of bacterium

Qipengyuania is a genus of Gram-negative bacteria.
