= Zuheros =

Zuheros, Spain
- Municipality
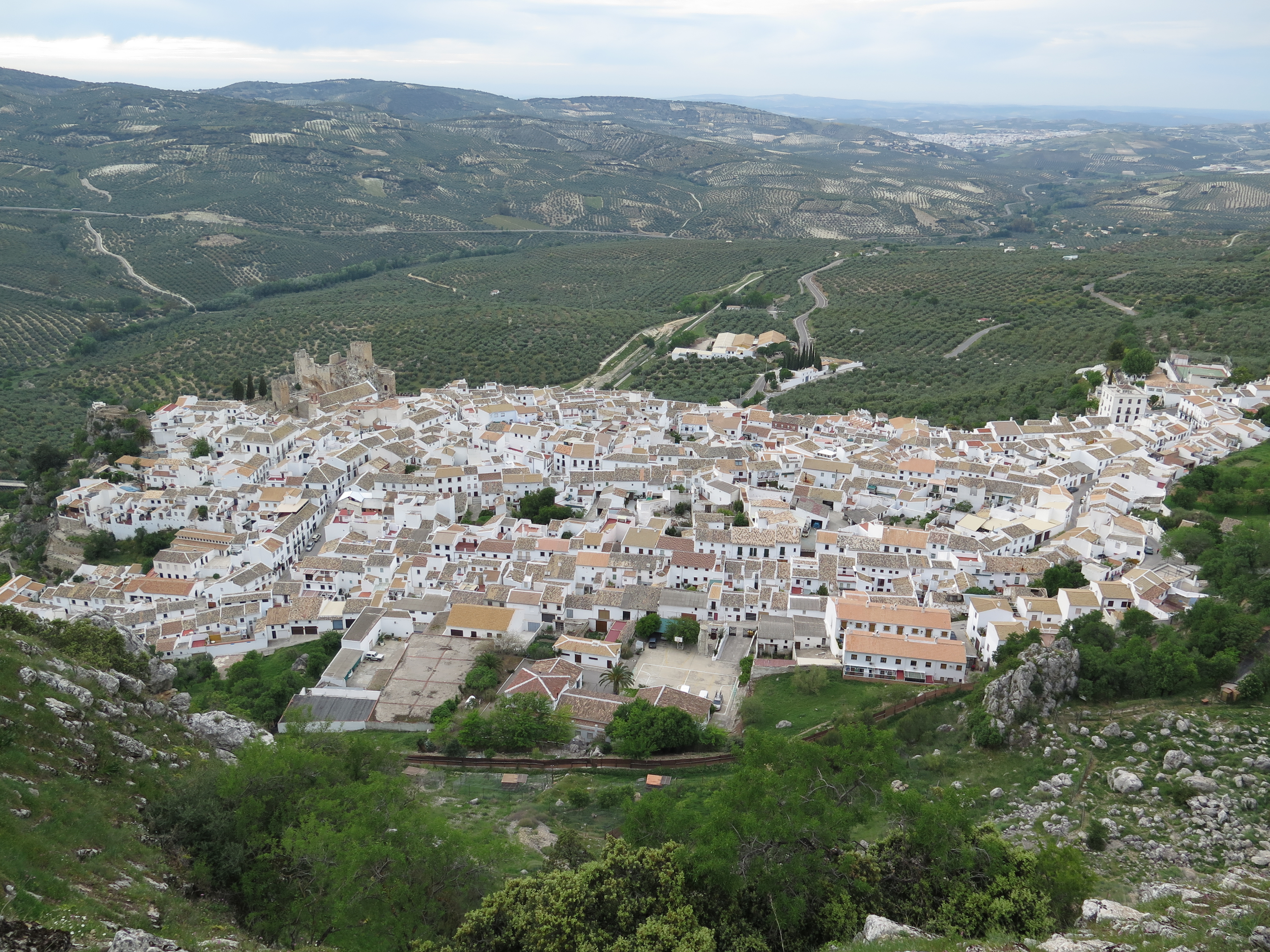

- Seal
- Interactive map of Zuheros, Spain
- Coordinates: 37°32′0″N 4°19′0″W
- Country: Spain
- Province: Córdoba
- Municipality: Zuheros

Area
  - Total: 42 km^{2} (16 sq mi)
- Elevation: 656 m (2,152 ft)

Population (2025-01-01)
  - Total: 596
  - Density: 14/km^{2} (37/sq mi)
- Time zone: UTC+1 (CET)
  - Summer (DST): UTC+2 (CEST)

Zuheros is a mountain village located in the province of Córdoba, Spain. According to the 2006 census (INE), it has a population of 821 inhabitants. Nearby are scenic walking routes.

Zuheros is one of the White Towns of Andalusia and is listed as one of the most beautiful towns in Spain and the world; since 2016 it has been part of the Association of Most Beautiful Villages in the World. Its peculiar castle is integrated into the rock of the mountain.

The Murcielagos cave, or Bats' Cave, is famous for the practice of speleology and for the presence of these animals.

== See also ==
- List of municipalities in Córdoba
