= Erythrobacteraceae =

Scientific classification
- Domain: Bacteria
- Kingdom: Pseudomonadati
- Phylum: Pseudomonadota
- Class: Alphaproteobacteria
- Order: Sphingomonadales
- Family: Erythrobacteraceae; Lee et al. 2005

Genera
- Alteraurantiacibacter Xu et al. 2020; Altererythrobacter Kwon et al. 2007; Altericroceibacterium Xu et al. 2020; Alteripontixanthobacter Xu et al. 2020; Alteriqipengyuania Xu et al. 2020; Aurantiacibacter Xu et al. 2020; Caenibius Hördt et al. 2020; "Citrimicrobium" Jung et al. 2014; Croceibacterium Liu et al. 2019; Croceicoccus Xu et al. 2009; Erythrobacter Shiba and Simidu 1982; Fulverythrobacter Lin et al. 2026; Litorerythrobacter Kathiresan et al. 2026; Novosphingobium Takeuchi et al. 2001; Parapontixanthobacter Xu et al. 2020; Paraurantiacibacter Xu et al. 2020; Parerythrobacter Xu et al. 2020; Pelagerythrobacter Xu et al. 2020; Pontixanthobacter Xu et al. 2020; Pseudopontixanthobacter Sun et al. 2020; Qipengyuania Feng et al. 2015; Tsuneonella Xu et al. 2020

Family of bacteria

Erythrobacteraceae is a bacterium family in the order Sphingomonadales.

== Phylogeny ==
The currently accepted taxonomy is based on the List of Prokaryotic names with Standing in Nomenclature and the phylogeny is based on whole-genome sequences.

- - Erythrobacteraceae
    - - - - - - - - Qipengyuania
                  - Alteriqipengyuania
                - - Parerythrobacter
                  - - Altererythrobacter
                    - Erythrobacter
              - - - Pontixanthobacter
                  - Pseudopontixanthobacter
                - - Alteripontixanthobacter
                  - Parapontixanthobacter
            - Pelagerythrobacter
          - Tsuneonella
        - - - Altericroceibacterium
            - Croceibacterium
          - - - Alteraurantiacibacter
              - Aurantiacibacter
            - Paraurantiacibacter
      - Croceicoccus
    - Novosphingobium
  - outgroup
    Sphingomonadaceae
