= Aster yellows =

Plant disease

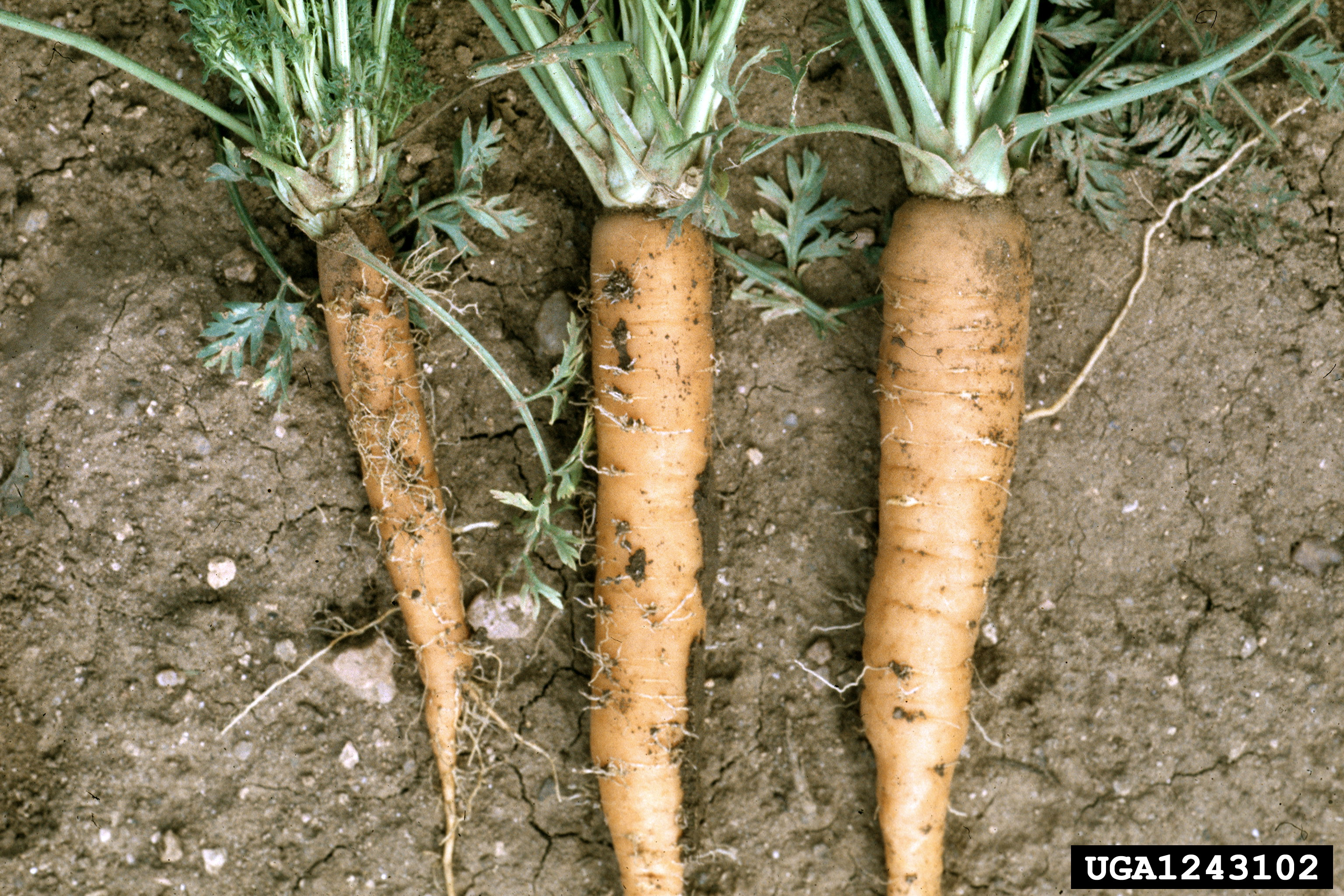
- Symptom range: healthy carrot is on right, seriously damaged carrot on left
- Causal agents: Phytoplasmas
- Hosts: Several, see text
- Vectors: Aster leafhopper (Macrosteles quadrilineatus)

Aster yellows is a chronic, systemic plant disease caused by several bacteria called phytoplasma. The aster yellows phytoplasma (AYP) affects 300 species in 38 families of broad-leaf herbaceous plants, primarily in the aster family, and important cereal crops such as wheat and barley. Symptoms are variable and can include phyllody, virescence, chlorosis, stunting, and sterility of flowers. The aster leafhopper vector, Macrosteles quadrilineatus, moves the aster yellows phytoplasma from plant to plant. Its economic burden is primarily felt in the carrot (Daucus carota ssp. sativus) crop and the nursery industries. No cure is known for plants infected with aster yellows. Infected plants should be removed immediately to limit the spread of the phytoplasma to other susceptible plants. However, in agricultural settings such as carrot fields, some applications of chemical insecticides have proven to minimize the infection rate by killing the vector.

== Hosts and symptoms ==
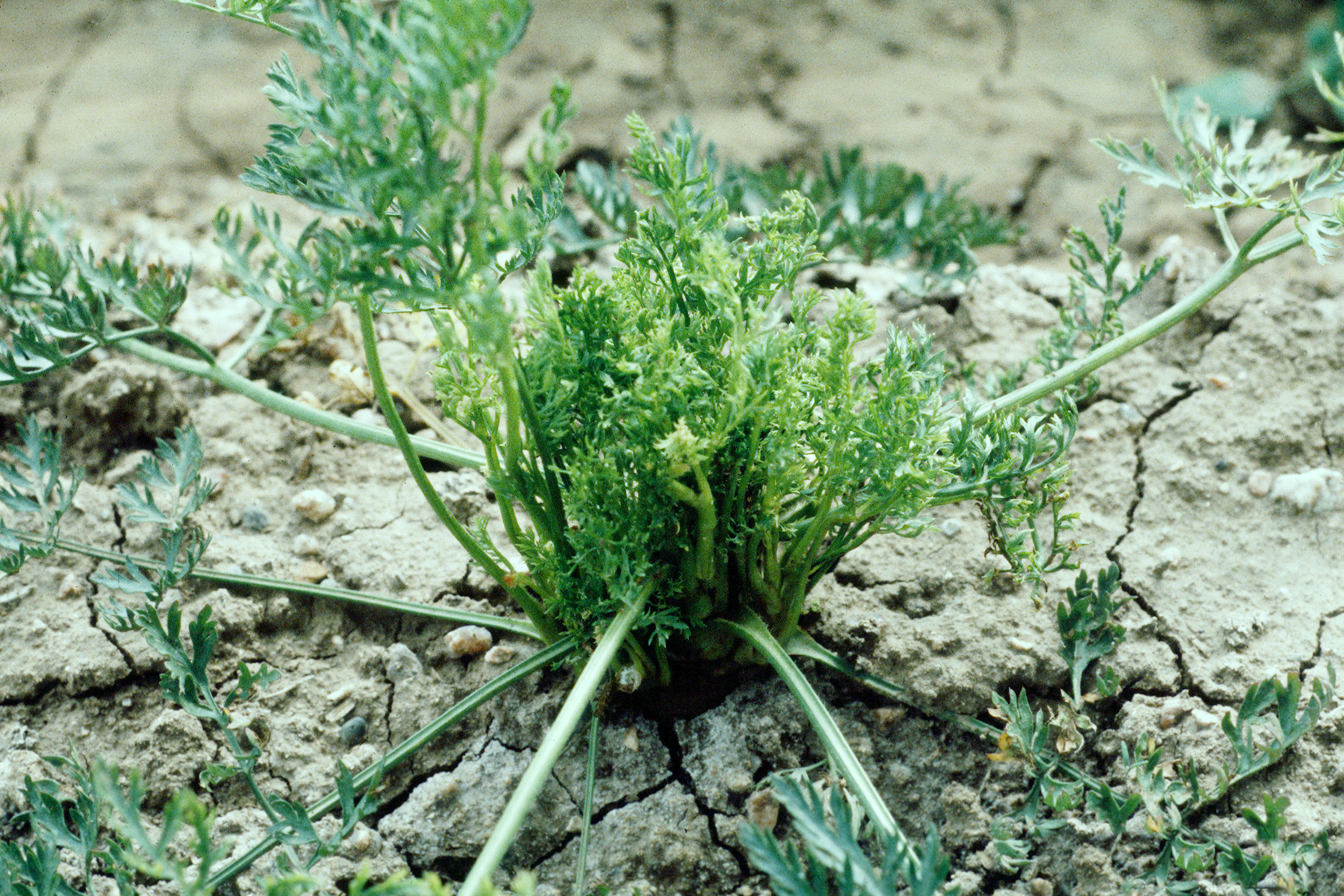
Witches'-broom of an infected carrot

Aster yellows affect many plant species, including native plants, annual flowering plants, ornamentals, weeds, and vegetable crops. The largest family affected is the Asteraceae, and ornamental plants commonly infected are asters, marigolds, coreopsis, sunflowers, and purple coneflower. Regarding vegetable crops, onion, lettuce, celery, and carrot are affected, with carrot and lettuce suffering the greatest losses.

The range of characteristic symptoms varies by the phytoplasma strain, timing of infection, plant species, temperature, age, and plant size. The symptoms can be mistaken for herbicide damage or virus symptoms. They include vein clearing until the entire leaf becomes chlorotic, stunting, deformation, virescence (greening of flowers), phyllody (development of leaf-like flower petals), reddening of foliage, reduced root system, and sterility. Aster yellows do not typically kill perennial host plants. Hot climates exacerbate the symptoms caused by the disease, while some plants in cooler climates may be asymptomatic.

Characteristic symptoms specific to the carrot include initial vein clearing and chlorosis, followed by the production of many adventitious shoots, with the tops looking like a witches’-broom. The internodes of such shoots are short, as are the leaf petioles. Young leaves are smaller and dry up, while the petioles of older leaves twist and break off. Any remaining older leaves turn bronze or red late in the season. Floral parts are deformed, and roots are smaller, abnormally shaped, and have woolly secondary roots. The carrot roots are predisposed to soft rots in the field and storage and taste unpleasant to the consumer.

== Disease cycle ==
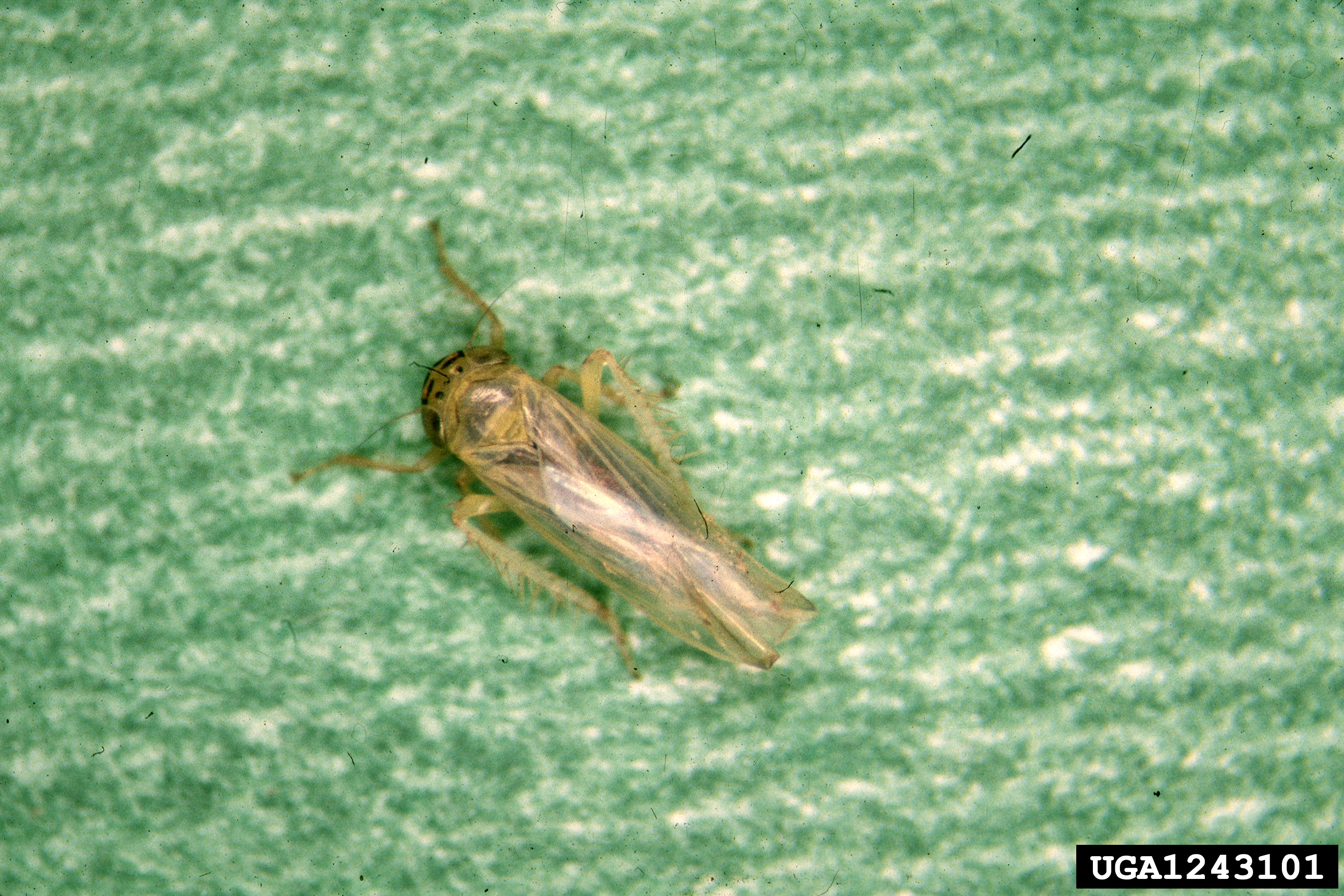
Aster leafhopper

The aster yellows disease is caused by the aster yellows phytoplasma (AYP), which is a phloem-limited, bacterium-like organism and is vectored by the aster leafhopper, Macrosteles quadrilineatus, a phloem-feeding insect of the order Hemiptera.

Phytoplasmas are small (0.5-1 μm in diameter) prokaryotes that reproduce by division or budding in the phloem sieve cells of the host plants and the bodies of their leafhopper vectors. Currently, AYP cannot be cultured in cell-free media, making detailed study somewhat more challenging. AYP can increase the fecundity and lifespan of their insect vector, thus enhancing the ability of the host to transfer AYP from plant to plant. The pathogen will overwinter in perennial weeds, ornamentals, and vegetables or be within the leafhopper vector. Some examples of weed host plants are thistle, wild carrot, dandelion, field daisy, black-eyed Susan, and wide-leafed plantain.

The vector leafhopper feeds on the phloem of aster yellows-infected plants by inserting its straw-like mouthpart, a stylet, into the cell and extracting it. Once the phytoplasma is acquired, an incubation period follows, during which it multiplies within the leafhopper and then moves to the salivary glands. The pathogen cannot be transferred by the vector until 10–12 days of incubation have passed. After this point, the phytoplasma can be transmitted to a new host through the saliva as the leafhopper feeds. Within 8–24 hours after inoculation, the phytoplasma moves out of the leaf into the host plant phloem. Cells adjacent to the phloem enlarge and die, while surviving cells begin to divide but soon die, too. Surrounding cells in the region of the necrotic area begin to divide and enlarge, producing abnormal sieve elements, while the phloem elements within the necrotic areas degenerate and collapse. Infected plants usually show symptoms after 8–9 days at 25 °C and 18 days at 20 °C, with no symptoms developing at 10 °C.

== Environment ==
Hardly any conditions directly affect the development of aster yellows, but a few indirect factors strongly influence the rate of transmission by the leafhopper. Conditions that favor the movement and spread of the leafhopper and encourage feeding to assist in spreading the phytoplasma.

Transcontinental migration begins in the spring when the prevailing winds and jet streams help carry the leafhoppers from their overwintering sites in the South to the Midwest. Upon arrival in the Midwest, they begin feeding. The leafhopper may have migrated into the region already carrying the phytoplasma, which it could have acquired from infected plants along the migration or while still in the South. The leafhopper could have also arrived but did not yet carry the phytoplasma. If this is the case, it could feed on infected perennial weeds to acquire AYP. Weather conditions greatly influence leafhopper flight because they are poor flyers. Temperatures below 15 °C or rainfall temporarily halt their migration and delay the time of infection. The leafhoppers feed all summer until they migrate back to their overwintering sites in the fall.

Weather conditions in the region also greatly influence leafhopper feeding patterns. If conditions are hot and dry, plants do not appear as lush and nutrient-rich to the phloem-feeding leafhopper, whereas seasons with abundant rainfall allow the plants to grow much more luxuriant. This means that hot and dry conditions are less conducive to the spread of aster yellows than times of abundant rainfall.

In the Western United States, no migration of the vector leafhoppers occurs. This allows for transmission of the phytoplasma year-round.

== Management ==
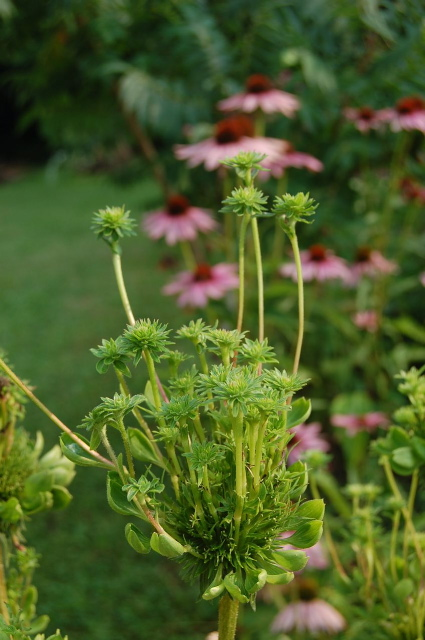
Phyllody on a purple coneflower

Aster yellows phytoplasma is a difficult pathogen to control, given its wide host range. Over 300 plant species are susceptible to AYP. Currently, no cure for aster yellows is known. Infected plants and weeds should be removed to eliminate the source of the phytoplasma and minimize spread. Unfortunately, this is the only control method that home gardeners have available.

On an agricultural level, speaking specifically about carrots, some methods can be used to manage the leafhopper populations in an attempt to control AYP spread. The aster yellows index (AYI) can determine when to apply chemical controls. The AYI equals the percentage of the leafhopper population containing AYP multiplied by the number of leafhoppers present per 100 sweeps. The resulting number can determine when to apply insecticides based on how susceptible the crop or cultivar is to leafhopper feeding. For highly susceptible crops or cultivars, an AYI of 50 indicates the need for application, while for intermediate crops or cultivars, the AYI is 75, and for crops or cultivars relatively resistant to economically harmful symptoms, the AYI is 100.

== Importance ==
AYP is an economically important plant pathogen in the agricultural and nursery industries. A 25% reduction in carrot yield is common, with losses reaching 80% occasionally. AYP causes symptoms that make the infected carrots unmarketable. In processed carrots, the presence of 15% of aster yellows-infected carrots results in a rejection of the entire product due to their distasteful flavor. The deformation of flowers and reproductive structures causes seeds not to form. This can be a problem in crops grown for seed for replanting purposes or consumption, such as coriander or caraway. Root stunting can also result in the loss of biannual crops over winter.

Similar problems arise in the nursery industry. Homeowners and landscapers purchasing plants do not want to buy an aster flower that is misshapen and has the potential to cause the spread of AYP to other plants. This makes it critical for nurseries to monitor their plants to prevent initial phytoplasma infection. Insecticides can be used to limit leaf hopper feeding on nursery stock, and as soon as infected plants are seen, they must be removed.
