= Phyllody =

Abnormal development of floral parts into leafy structures

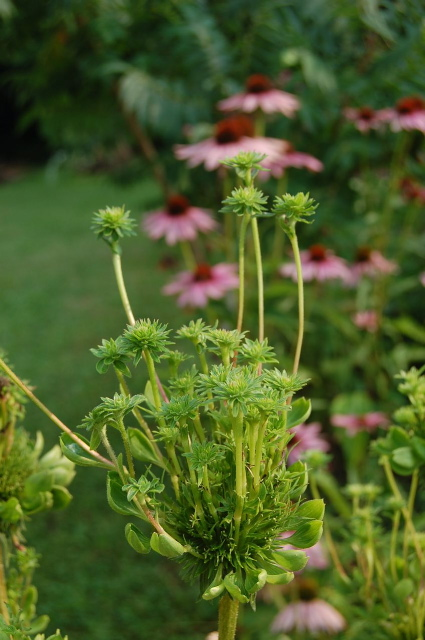
Phyllody on a purple coneflower (Echinacea purpurea)

Phyllody is the abnormal development of floral parts into leafy structures. It is generally caused by phytoplasma or virus infections, though it may also be because of environmental factors that result in an imbalance in plant hormones. Phyllody causes the affected plant to become partially or entirely sterile, as it is unable to produce normal flowers.

The condition is also known as phyllomorphy or frondescence; though the latter may sometimes refer more generically to foliage, leafiness, or the process of leaf growth. Phyllody is usually differentiated from floral virescence, wherein the flowers merely turn green in color but otherwise retain their normal structure. However, floral virescence and phyllody (along with witch's broom and other growth abnormalities), commonly occur together as symptoms of the same diseases. The term chloranthy is also often used for phyllody (particularly flowers exhibiting complete phyllody, such that it resembles leaf buds more than flowers), though in some cases it may refer to floral virescence.

== History ==
In the late 18th century, the German poet and philosopher Johann Wolfgang von Goethe noted strange-looking rose flowers where the flower organs were replaced by leafy or stem-like structures. This led him to hypothesize that plant organs arising from the stem are simply modifications of the same basic leaf organ. During growth, these organs naturally differentiate into specialized or generalized structures like petals or leaves. However, if certain factors interfere during the early growth stages, these organs can develop into something other than the original "plan of construction". He called this abnormal growth "metamorphosis" and it is the main topic of his essay Versuch die Metamorphose der Pflanzen zu erklären (1790), better known in English as the Metamorphosis of Plants. Goethe's hypothesis was poorly received by other scientists during his time, but it is now known to be essentially correct. The concepts he discusses while describing metamorphosis is now known as homology, the basis of the modern science of comparative anatomy and a discovery that is usually credited to the English biologist Sir Richard Owen.

In 1832, the German-American botanist George Engelmann described the same condition in his work De Antholysi Prodromus. He gave it the name "frondescence". Nineteen years later, the Belgian botanist Charles Jacques Édouard Morren also investigated the phenomenon in his book Lobelia (1851). Morren called the condition "phyllomorphy", and unlike Engelmann, Morren explicitly distinguished phyllomorphy (wherein the floral parts are replaced by leaf-like structures) from virescence (wherein the affected parts, not necessarily floral, turn green but retain the original form or structure).

The term "phyllody" was coined by the English botanist Maxwell T. Masters in his book on plant abnormalities, Vegetable Teratology (1869). The term is derived from Scientific Latin phyllodium, which is itself derived from Ancient Greek φυλλώδης (phullodes, 'leaf-like'). Like Morren, Masters also distinguished phyllody from virescence. He acknowledged "frondescence" and "phyllomorphy" as synonyms of phyllody.

== Description ==
Phyllody is characterized by the partial or complete replacement of floral organs with true leaves. Phyllody can affect bracts, the calyx (sepals), corolla (petals), the gynoecium (carpels/pistils), and the androecium (stamens). Phyllody may be partial, affecting only some sets of floral organs or even only half of a set of floral organs (e.g. only three petals out of six in a single flower); or it can be complete, with all the floral organs replaced by leaves.

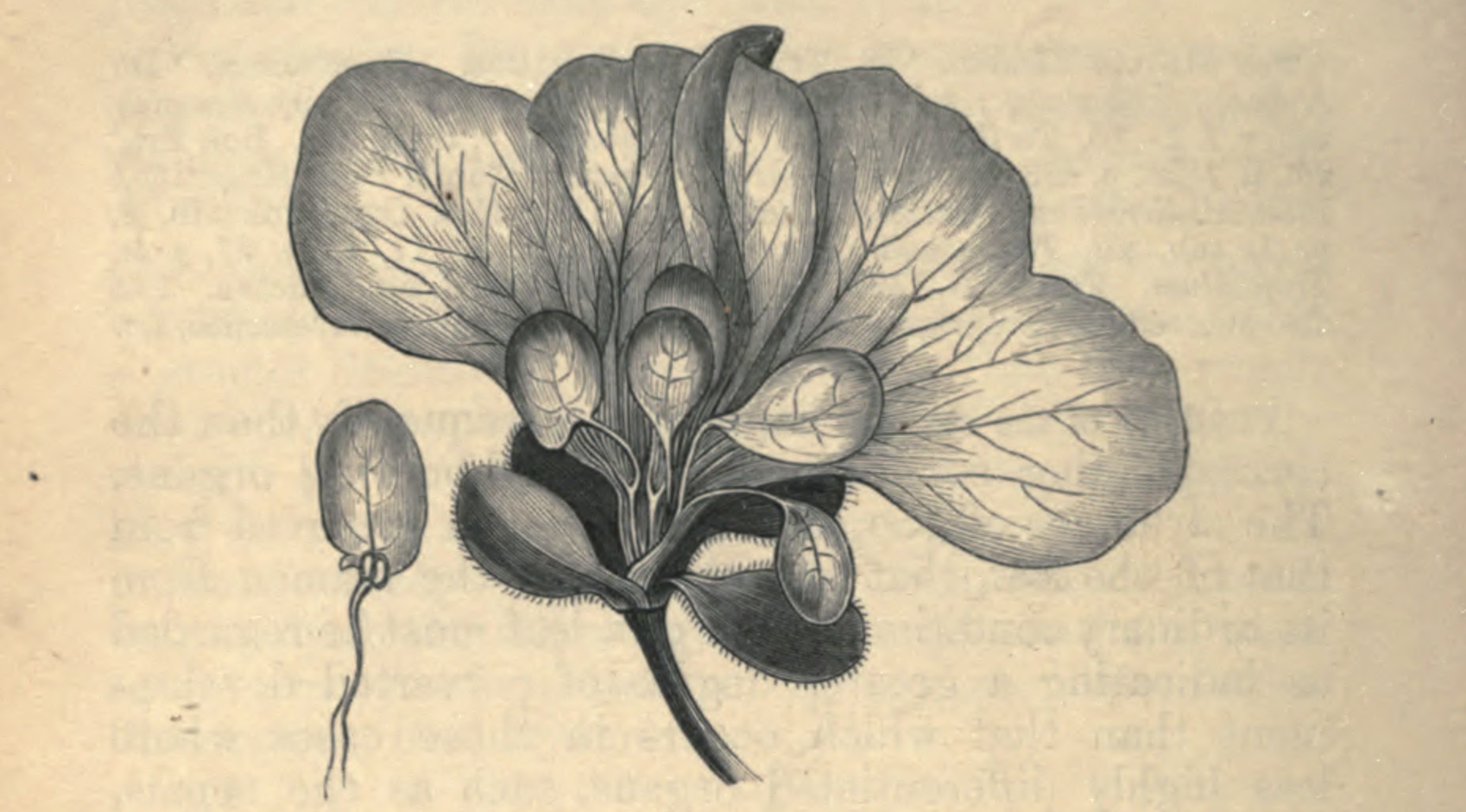
Illustration from Vegetable Teratology (1869), showing a Petunia flower with stamens partially replaced by "stalked" leaves. The stalks are actually the retained filaments of the stamens, while the anthers have been replaced by small leaves.

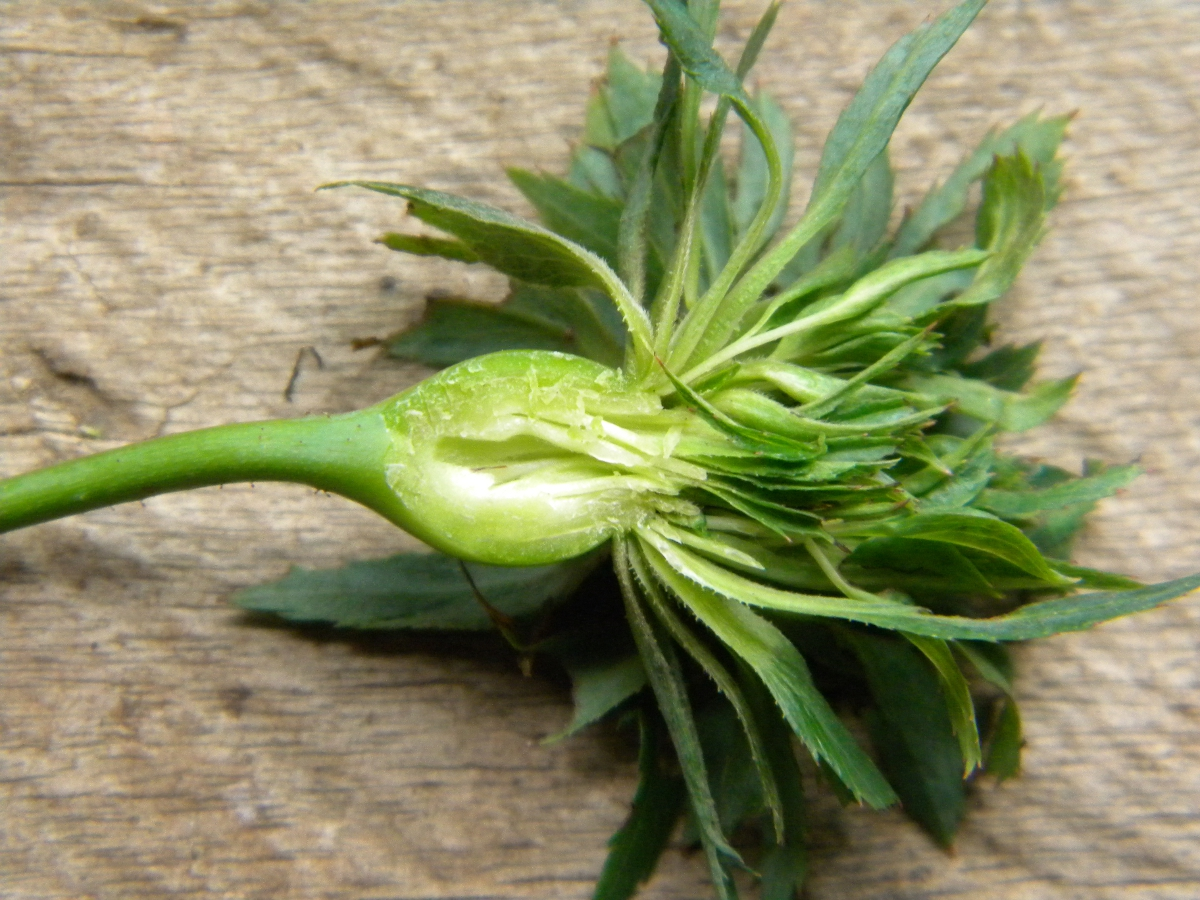
Longitudinal section of a rose flower exhibiting phyllody. Despite the apparent hips, the reproductive organs are completely absent and have been replaced by leaves.

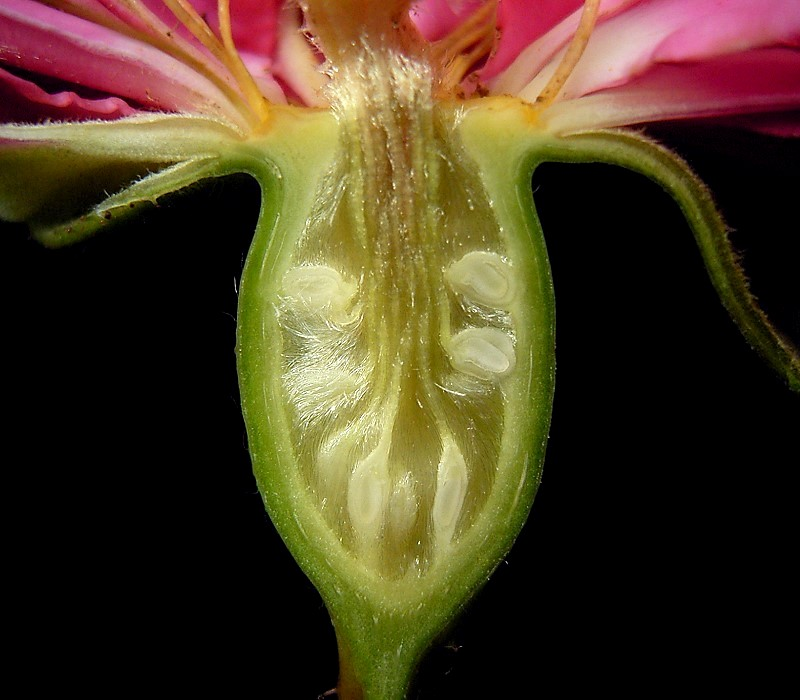
Longitudinal section of a normal developing rose hip

Phyllody of the bracts is common among plants which bear catkin (amentaceous) inflorescences. They are very common among members of the genus Plantago, for example, as well as the common hop (Humulus lupulus). Involucral bracts of the flowers of members of the family Asteraceae like dahlias and dandelions, may also be affected.

Sepals that exhibit phyllody are usually hard to detect due to fact that most sepals already resemble leaves. Close examination, however, can reveal differences in venation in normal sepals and sepals that exhibit phyllody. The full development of perfect leaves from sepals is more common among flowers that have united sepals (monosepalous) than in flowers with separated sepals (polysepalous).

Phyllody of the petals can be expressed more mildly as a simple change in shape and color (in which case, it's more accurately virescence), or it can be expressed as fully formed leaves. It is more common among flowers which exhibit corollas of distinct petals (polypetalous) than in flowers in which the petals are fused into a single tube or bowl-like structure (monopetalous).

Phyllody of the stamens is rare. In fact, the stamens are the least likely of the floral organs to be affected by phyllody. This is thought to be because the stamens are the most highly differentiated organs in flowers.

In contrast, phyllody of the carpels is much more common than the corresponding changes in stamens. Usually, phyllody affects the proximal parts of the carpel (the ovary) more than the distal parts (the style and stigma). The ovule itself may be exposed on the edges or on the inner surface of the carpel if the ovary becomes leaf-like. If the ovule is affected by phyllody, it develops separately from the rest of the carpel. The best known example of phyllody of the carpels is found in the Japanese cherry (Prunus serrulata), in which one or both of the carpels can become leaf-like (although the distal half of the style and the stigma are usually unaffected). Incidentally, some Japanese cherry cultivars also exhibit "doubling" of the petals due to petalody, where a second corolla develops instead of stamens.

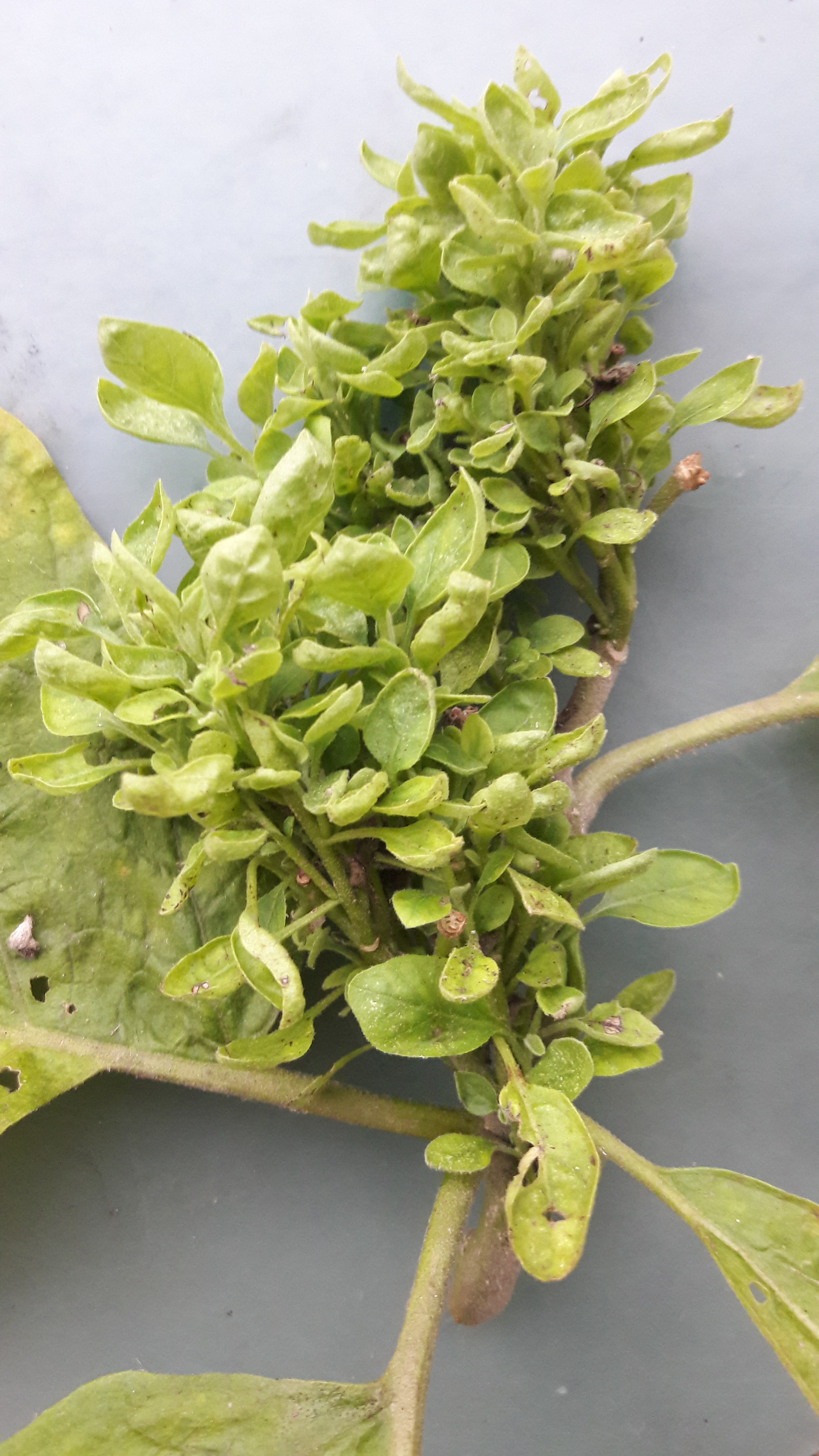
Phyllody on a Brinjal (Solanum melongena)

== Causes ==
=== Biotic ===
In many cultivated plants, phyllody is caused by infections of plant pathogens and/or infestations of ectoparasites. Aside from exhibiting phyllody, they may also exhibit other symptoms like virescence, witch's brooms, chlorosis, and stunted growth. Examples of these biotic factors include:

- Phytoplasmas - specialized prokaryotic microorganisms that cause more than 200 distinct plant diseases. They resemble other bacteria but lack cell walls and are filamentous or pleomorphic in form. They are obligate parasites of plant phloem tissue and are spread by insect vectors. They are the most common cause of phyllody. Evidence suggests that phytoplasmas downregulate a gene involved in petal formation, instead causing leaves or leaflike structures to form. Examples of commercially important phytoplasma diseases are aster yellows, apple proliferation, clover phyllody, and Sesamum phyllody.
- Viruses, like the rose rosette disease (RRD)
- Fungi, like the smut fungus Sphacelotheca reiliana of maize (Zea mays) and the rust fungus Atelocauda koae which infects Acacia koa
- Water molds, like Sclerophthora macrospora which infects more than 140 kinds of cereals including rice, maize, and wheat. The disease is more commonly known as "crazy top" because its most striking symptom is phyllody of the ears and tassels.
- Insect damage

In addition to causing phyllody itself, insects and other ectoparasites also serve as disease vectors that can spread phyllody to other nearby plants. The most common of these insect vectors are leafhoppers, an example of which is Hishimonus phycitis, which transmits the phytoplasma-caused little leaf phyllody in eggplants. The broken-backed bug (Taylorilygus apicalis) is another insect vector of a phytoplasma-caused phyllody in species of Parthenium. Other ectoparasite vectors include eriophyid mites, like the rose leaf curl mite (Phyllocoptes fructiplilus) which is known to be the primary vector of the rose rosette disease; and the chrysanthemum rust mite (Paraphytoptus chrysanthemi) which transmits phytoplasma-caused phyllody in species of chrysanthemums.

=== Abiotic ===
Environmental abiotic factors like hot weather or water stress that result in an imbalance in plant hormones during flowering can cause phyllody. These can usually be differentiated from phyllody caused by biotic factors by the simultaneous presence of healthy and abnormal flowers. When conditions normalize, the plants resume normal flowering. The susceptibility of plants to environmentally caused phyllody can be genetic.

=== Artificial ===
Phyllody can be artificially induced by applying cytokinins (CK), plant hormones responsible for cell division, as well as apical dominance and axillary bud growth. Conversely, it can be subsequently suppressed with the application of gibberellins (GA), plant hormones responsible for stem elongation, flowering, and sex expression.

== Related floral teratology ==
Other related floral development abnormalities are:

- Petalody - The transformation of floral organs (usually the stamens) into petals.
- Pistillody - The transformation of floral organs into pistils.
- Sepalody - The transformation of floral organs into sepals or sepal-like bodies.
- Staminody - The transformation of floral organs into stamens.

== Phyllody in plant breeding ==
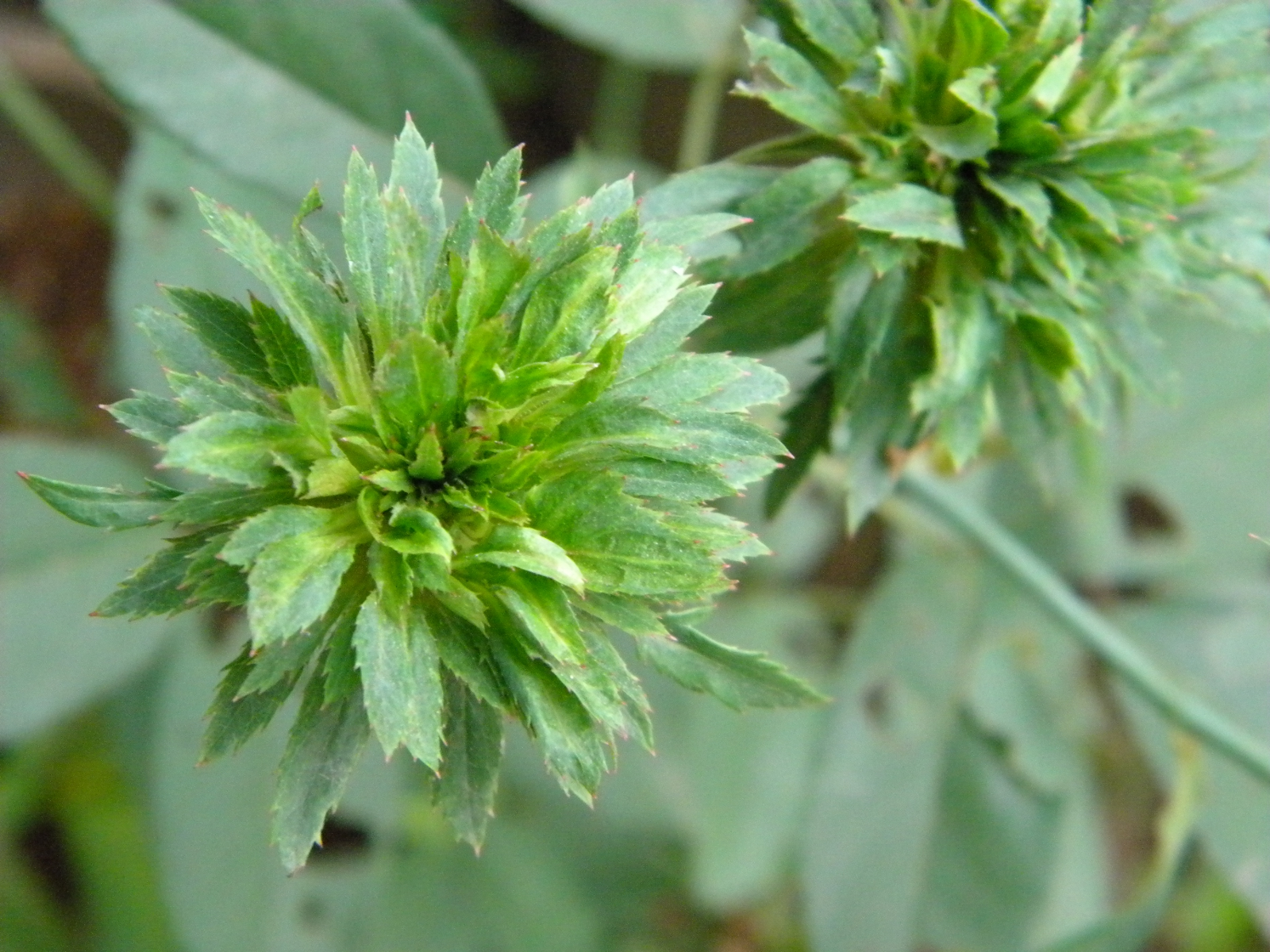
Phyllody in the green rose (Rosa chinensis 'Viridiflora')

In some cases, the occurrence of phyllody has been utilized in plant breeding. One of the most well known examples is the green rose (Rosa chinensis 'Viridiflora'), an ancient Chinese rose cultivar which exhibits green leafy bracts in tight flower-like clusters. In green rose, artificial selection has enabled phyllody to be expressed as a stable mutation.

== See also ==
- Adventitiousness
- Epicormic shoot
- Fasciation
