= Teratology =

Study of developmental anomalies

Teratology is the study of abnormalities of physiological development in organisms during their life span. It is a sub-discipline in medical genetics which focuses on the classification of congenital abnormalities in dysmorphology caused by teratogens and also in pharmacology and toxicology.

Teratogens are substances that may cause non-heritable birth defects via a toxic effect on an embryo or fetus. Defects include malformations, disruptions, deformations, and dysplasia that may cause stunted growth, delayed mental development, or other congenital disorders that lack structural malformations. These defects can be recognized prior to or at birth as well as later during early childhood. The related term developmental toxicity includes all manifestations of abnormal development that are caused by environmental insult.

The extent to which teratogens will impact an embryo is dependent on several factors, such as how long the embryo has been exposed, the stage of development the embryo was in when exposed (gestational timing), the genetic makeup of the embryo, and the transfer rate of the teratogen. The dose of the teratogen, the route of exposure to the teratogen, and the chemical nature of the teratogenic agent also contribute to the level of teratogenicity.

== Etymology ==
The term was borrowed in 1842 from the French tératologie, where it was formed in 1830 from the Greek τέρας teras (word stem τέρατ- terat-), meaning "sign sent by the gods, portent, marvel, monster", and -ologie (-ology), used to designate a discourse, treaty, science, theory, or study of some topic.

Old literature referred to abnormalities of all kinds under the Latin term Lusus naturae (lit. 'freak of nature'). As early as the 17th century, Teratology referred to a discourse on prodigies and marvels of anything so extraordinary as to seem abnormal. In the 19th century, it acquired a meaning more closely related to biological deformities, mostly in the field of botany. Currently, its most instrumental meaning is that of the medical study of teratogenesis, congenital malformations or individuals with significant malformations. Historically, people have used many pejorative terms to describe/label cases of significant physical malformations. In the 1960s, David W. Smith of the University of Washington Medical School (one of the researchers who became known in 1973 for the discovery of fetal alcohol syndrome), popularized the term teratology. With the growth of understanding of the origins of birth defects, the field of teratology as of 2015 overlaps with other fields of science, including developmental biology, embryology, and genetics.

Until the 1940s, teratologists regarded birth defects as primarily hereditary. In 1941, the first well-documented cases of environmental agents being the cause of severe birth defects were reported.

== Teratogenesis ==
Teratogenesis occurs when the development of an embryo is altered negatively due to the presence of teratogens. Teratogens are the causes of teratogenesis. Common examples of teratogens include genetic disorders, maternal nutrition and health, and chemical agents such as drugs and alcohol. Lesser known examples that will be covered include stress, caffeine, and deficiencies in diet and nutrition. Although teratogens can affect a fetus during any time in the pregnancy, one of the most sensitive time frames for them to be exposed to the developing embryo is during the embryonic period. This period is in effect from about the fourteenth day following when a female's egg is implanted into a specific place in the reproductive organs and sixty days after conception. Teratogens are able to cause abnormal defects through certain mechanisms that occur throughout the development of the embryo.

=== Wilson's principles ===
In 1959 and in his 1973 monograph Environment and Birth Defects, embryologist James Wilson put forth six principles of teratogenesis to guide the study and understanding of teratogenic agents and their effects on developing organisms. These principles were derived from and expanded on by those laid forth by zoologist Camille Dareste in the late 19th century:

1. Susceptibility to teratogenesis depends on the genotype of the conceptus and the manner in which this interacts with adverse environmental factors.
2. Susceptibility to teratogenesis varies with the developmental stage at the time of exposure to an adverse influence. There are critical periods of susceptibility to agents and organ systems affected by these agents.
3. Teratogenic agents act in specific ways on developing cells and tissues to initiate sequences of abnormal developmental events.
4. The access of adverse influences to developing tissues depends on the nature of the influence. Several factors affect the ability of a teratogen to contact a developing conceptus, such as the nature of the agent itself, route and degree of maternal exposure, rate of placental transfer and systemic absorption, and composition of the maternal and embryonic/fetal genotypes.
5. There are four manifestations of deviant development (death, malformation, growth retardation and functional defect).
6. Manifestations of deviant development increase in frequency and degree as dosage increases from the No Observable Adverse Effect Level (NOAEL) to a dose producing 100% lethality (LD_{100}).

The mechanisms of these teratogens lie in specific alterations to genes, cells, and tissues within the developing organism that cause deviation from normal development and can result in functional defects, growth stunts, malformation, and even death. Finally, susceptibility to teratogens is more elevated during specific, critical periods during development.

=== Oxidative stress ===
The natural metabolic processes of the human body produce highly reactive oxygen-containing molecules called reactive oxygen species. Being highly reactive, these molecules can oxidatively damage fats, proteins, and DNA, and alter signal transduction. Teratogens such as thalidomide, methamphetamine, and phenytoin are known to enhance ROS formation, potentially leading to teratogenesis

ROS damage a certain class of reactions called redox reactions, which are chemical processes in which substances change their oxidation states by donating or accepting electrons. In these reactions, ROS act as strong oxidizing agents. They accept electrons from other molecules, causing those molecules to become oxidized. This shifts the balance of redox reactions in cells, inducing oxidative stress when ROS levels are high, leading to cellular damage.

Developmental processes such as rapid cell division, cell differentiation into different types, and apoptosis rely on pathways that involve communication between cells through a process called signal transduction. These pathways' proper functioning is highly dependent on a certain class of reactions called redox reactions; many of these pathways are vulnerable to disruption due to oxidative stress. Therefore, one mechanism by which teratogens induce teratogenesis is by triggering oxidative stress and derailing redox-dependent signal transduction pathways in early development.

Folate plays key roles in DNA methylation and in synthesis of nitrogenous bases found in DNA and RNA. These processes are crucial for cell division, cell growth, gene regulation, protein synthesis, and cell differentiation. All these processes ensure normal fetal development. Since the developing fetus requires rapid cell growth and division, the demand for folate increase during pregnancy, which if not met, can lead to teratogenic complications.

=== Epigenetic modifications ===
Epigenetic modifications are any heritable modifications to the expression of genes in the DNA that do not include direct code alteration of the base genome. These modifications can include heritable alterations in transcriptional and translational processes of certain genes and even their interactions with other genes. Many known teratogens affect fetal development by inducing these epigenetic modifications including turning on/off transcriptional processes of certain genes, regulating the location and distribution of proteins inside the cell, and regulating cell differentiation by modifying which mRNA molecules are translated into protein.

During embryo development, a temporary organ called a placenta forms in the womb, connecting the mother to the fetus. The placenta provides oxygen and nutrients to the developing fetus throughout the pregnancy. Environmental influences such as under-nutrition, drugs, alcohol, tobacco smoke, and even abnormal hormonal activity can lead to epigenetic changes in the placental cells and harm the fetus in the long term, though specific mechanisms by which developmental damage takes place remains unclear.

=== Causes ===
Common causes of teratogenesis include:

- Genetic disorders and chromosomal abnormalities
- Maternal health factors
  - Nutrition during pregnancy (e.g., spina bifida resulting from folate deficiency)
  - Metabolic disorders such as diabetes and thyroid disease
  - Stress
- Chemical agents
  - Prescription and recreational drugs (e.g., alcohol, thalidomide)
  - Environmental toxins and contaminants (e.g., heavy metals such as mercury and lead, polychlorinated biphenyls (PCBs))
- Vertically transmitted infections such as rubella and syphilis
- Ionizing radiation such as X-rays and that emitted from nuclear fallout
- Temperatures outside the accepted range for a given organism

== Human pregnancy ==
In humans, congenital disorders resulted in about 510,000 deaths globally in 2010.

About 3% of newborns have a "major physical anomaly", meaning a physical anomaly that has cosmetic or functional significance. Developmental defects manifest in approximately 3% to 5% of newborns in the United States, between 2% and 3% of which are teratogen-induced. Congenital disorders are responsible for 20% of infant deaths. The most common congenital diseases are heart defects, Down syndrome, and neural tube defects. Trisomy 21 is the most common type of Down syndrome. About 95% of infants born with Down syndrome have this disorder and it consists of three separate copies of chromosomes. Translocation Down syndrome is not as common, as only 3% of infants with Down syndrome are diagnosed with this type. VSD, ventricular septal defect, is the most common type of heart defect in infants. If an infant has a large VSD it can result into heart failure. Infants with a smaller VSD have a 96% survival rate and those with a moderate VSD have about an 86% survival rate. Lastly, NTD, neural tube defect, is a defect that forms in the brain and spine during early development. If the spinal cord is exposed and touching the skin it can require surgery to prevent an infection.

=== Medications ===
Though many pregnancies are accompanied with prescription drugs, there is limited knowledge regarding the potential teratogenic risks. Only medications that are commonly taken during pregnancies that are known to cause structural birth defects are considered teratogenic agents. One common drug in particular that is teratogenic is isotretinoin, known by many as Accutane. It became popular through its success in the care and treatment of skin cancer and severe acne. However, over time it has become clear that it causes severe teratogenic effects with 20-35% of exposed embryos experiencing developmental defects. Exposure of isotretinoin has led to severe skull, facial, cardiovascular, and neurological defects. Another drug known as carbamazepine is sometimes prescribed during pregnancy if the mother experiences more extreme concerns regarding epilepsy or bipolar disorder. Unfortunately, this drug can also cause birth and developmental defects especially during the early stages of pregnancy such as defects of the neural tube, which develops into the brain and spinal cord. An example of this is spina bifida. Oral and topical antifungal agents such as fluconazole, ketoconazole, and terbinafine are commonly prescribed in pregnancy. Some fungal infections are asymptomatic and therefore do not really cause discomfort, but some are slightly more severe and can negatively affect a pregnant woman's life quality and even the fetus. This is primarily when antifungal agents are prescribed during pregnancy. Unfortunately, the use of antifungal agents can lead to spontaneous abortions and defects mainly regarding the cardiovascular and musculoskeletal systems, as well as some eye defects. It is safer to avoid taking medications during pregnancy to keep the likelihood of teratogenicity low, as the chances of any pregnancy resulting in birth defects is only 3-5%. However, it is necessary and cannot be avoided in certain cases. As with any medical concern, a doctor should always be consulted in order for the pregnancy to have the best outcome possible for both mother and baby.

==== Acitretin ====
Acitretin is a retinoid and vitamin A derivative that is used in the treatment of psoriasis. Acitretin is highly teratogenic and noted for the possibility of severe birth defects. It was initially suggested as a replacement for Etretinate. It should not be used by pregnant women or women planning to get pregnant within 3 years following the use of acitretin. Sexually active women of childbearing age who use acitretin should also use at least two forms of birth control concurrently. Men and women who use it should not donate blood for three years after using it, because of the possibility that the blood might be used in a pregnant patient and cause birth defects. In addition, it may cause nausea, headache, itching, dry, red or flaky skin, dry or red eyes, dry or chapped lips, swollen lips, dry mouth, thirst, cystic acne or hair loss.

==== Etretinate ====
Etretinate (trade name Tegison) is a medication developed by Hoffmann–La Roche that was approved by the FDA in 1986 to treat severe psoriasis. It is a second-generation retinoid. It was subsequently removed from the Canadian market in 1996 and the United States market in 1998 due to the high risk of birth defects. It remains on the market in Japan as Tigason.

==== Isotretinoin ====
Isotretinoin is classified as a retinoid drug and is used as a treatment for severe acne, other skin conditions, and some cancer types. In treatment against acne, it functions by hindering the activity of skin's sebaceous glands. It is extremely effective in its use in treatment against severe acne, but does have some negative side effects such as dry skin, nausea, joint and muscle pain, blistering skin, and the development of sores on mucous membranes. Some brand names for isotretinoin are Accutane, Absorica, Claravis, and Myorisan. Accutane is no longer on the market, but many other generic alternatives are available.

Image of isotretinoin chemical structure

Prenatal exposure to isotretinoin can cause neurocognitive impairment in some children. Isotretinoin is able to cross the placenta, potentially harming the developing fetus. If a fetus is exposed to isotretinoin during the first trimester of pregnancy, craniofacial, cardiac, and central nervous system malformations can occur. Some prenatal exposures to isotretinoin can result in still births or spontaneous abortions. The use of isotretinoin during pregnancy can increase cell apoptosis, leading to malformations, as well as heart defects.

==== Vaccination ====
In humans, vaccination has become readily available, and is important for the prevention of various communicable diseases such as polio and rubella, among others. There has been no association between congenital malformations and vaccination — for example, a population-wide study in Finland in which expectant mothers received the oral polio vaccine found no difference in infant outcomes when compared with mothers from reference cohorts who had not received the vaccine. However, on grounds of theoretical risk, it is still not recommended to vaccinate for polio while pregnant unless there is risk of infection. An important exception to this relates to provision of the influenza vaccine while pregnant. During the 1918 and 1957 influenza pandemics, mortality from influenza in pregnant women was 45%. In a 2005 study of vaccination during pregnancy, Munoz et al. demonstrated that there was no adverse outcome observed in the new infants or mothers, suggesting that the balance of risk between infection and vaccination favored preventative vaccination.

==== Reproductive hormones and hormone replacement therapy ====
There are a number of ways that a fetus can be affected in pregnancy, specifically due to exposure to various substances. There are a number of drugs that can do this, specifically drugs such as female reproductive hormones or hormone replacement drugs such as estrogen and progesterone that are not only essential for reproductive health, but also pose concerns when it comes to the synthetic alternatives to these. This can cause a multitude of congenital abnormalities and deformities, many of which can ultimately affect the fetus and even the mother's reproductive system in the long term. According to a study conducted from 2015 till 2018, it was found that there was an increased risk of both maternal and neonatal complications developing as a result of hormone replacement therapy cycles being conducted during pregnancy, especially in regards to hormones such as estrogen, testosterone and thyroid hormone. When hormones such as estrogen and testosterone are replaced, this can cause the fetus to become stunted in growth, born prematurely with a lower birth weight, develop intellectual disability, while in turn causing the mother's ovarian reserve to be depleted while increasing ovarian follicular recruitment.

==== Chemotherapeutic agents ====
It is rare for cancer and pregnancy to coincide, occurring in only 1 in 1,000 pregnancies and making up less than 0.1% of all recorded malignant tumors. However, when this does occur, there are many complications and great, although not well understood, risks to the fetus in the event that chemotherapy drugs are used. The majority of these drugs are cytotoxic, meaning that they have the potential to be carcinogenic, mutagenic, and teratogenic. If used during the first two weeks of pregnancy, they may inhibit implantation of the fetus and led to miscarriage. They may particularly act as teratogenic agents if used from the second to eighth week, as this is a critical stage for tissue differentiation. The highest risk continues through the first trimester, making up 14% of major malformations. Chemotherapeutic drugs are considered safer to use during the second and third trimester, but there is limited research to fully support this.

==== Thalidomide ====
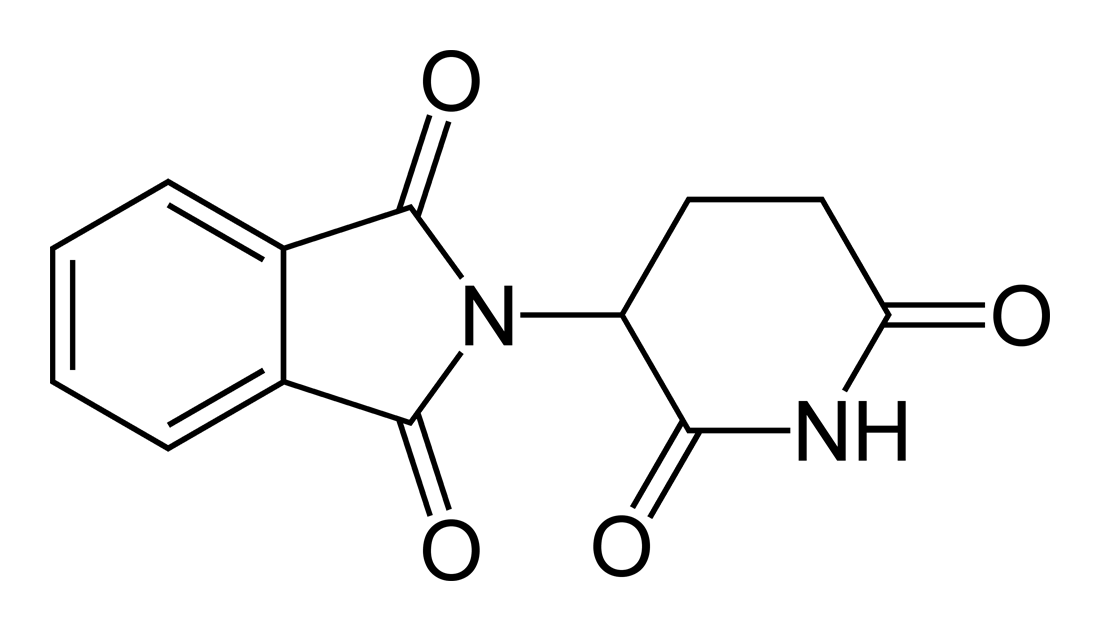
Thalidomide chemical structure. The chemical structure of thalidomide allows it to act as a DNA intercalating agent.

Thalidomide, also known as Thalomid, was used in the mid-1900s primarily, as a sedative. It is a drug that was first introduced in Germany and spread to other countries as a therapeutic prescription from the 1950s to early 1960s in Europe as an anti-nausea medication to alleviate morning sickness among pregnant women. While the exact mechanism of action of thalidomide is not known, it is thought to be related to inhibition of angiogenesis through interaction with the insulin like growth factor(IGF-1) and fibroblast like growth factor 2 (FGF-2) pathways. This drug acted upon the immune system causing the overall blood cell count be reduced after repeated usage and hindered the generation of the cells. In the 1960s, it became apparent that thalidomide altered embryo development and led to limb deformities such as thumb absence, underdevelopment of entire limbs, or phocomelia. It is among the first known drugs that research pointed towards the possibility of it causing birth defects. Thalidomide may have caused teratogenic effects in over 10,000 babies worldwide. As it became more well known, other uses were found, such as its use in leprosy treatment, cancer treatment, and HIV infections.

=== Recreational drugs ===
==== Alcohol ====
Baby with fetal alcohol syndrome, showing some of the characteristic facial features

In the US, alcohol is subject to the FDA drug labeling Pregnancy Category X (Contraindicated in pregnancy). Alcohol is known to cause fetal alcohol spectrum disorder.

There are a wide range of affects that Prenatal Alcohol Exposure (PAE) can have on a developing fetus. Some of the most prominent possible outcomes include the development of Fetal Alcohol Syndrome, a reduction in brain volume, still births, spontaneous abortions, impairments of the nervous system, and much more. Fetal Alcohol Syndrome has numerous symptoms which may include cognitive impairments and impairment of the facial features. PAE remains the leading cause of birth defects and neurodevelopmental abnormalities in the United States, affecting 9.1 to 50 per 1,000 live births in the U.S. and 68.0 to 89.2 per 1,000 in populations with high levels of alcohol use.

==== Tobacco and Nicotine ====
Consuming tobacco products while pregnant or breastfeeding can have significant negative impacts on the health and development of the unborn child and newborn infant. In a research study conducted in 1957, the relationship between tobacco consumption during pregnancy and premature births was studied. The research showed that there was significant evidence that tobacco consumption during pregnancy can cause the mother to go into labor and deliver earlier than determined due date. Some of the data showed conflicting evidence because tobacco reduces premature birth via gestational hypertension but increases other symptom risks. From 1957 to 1986 there were over 500,000 babies observed in studies that showed pregnant mothers intaking tobacco have increased probability that the baby birthed will weigh less than babies birthed by non-smoking mothers. A research study was conducted on six year old's and found a correlation between lower birth weights and lower IQ levels. This can be harmful to the child potentially affecting their brain development over time as the fetus was not able to have the development of the neurological pathways needed to grow. Tobacco use can also cause stillbirths in mothers who are pregnant, increasing the probability up to three times more risk than non tobacco users. Research shows that the earlier in the pregnancy the mother is the higher chance of a still birth baby being born. Babies that are exposed to nicotine and tobacco can develop an addiction to this substance while still developing, causing addict-like behavioral patterns when born.

==== E-Cigarettes ====
E-Cigarettes are electronic devices that contain a heating device as well as a cartridge to hold liquid in. The liquid in the cartridges contain nicotine in about one-third to two-thirds the amount in regular cigarettes. This means that the nicotine still crosses the placenta, and can be detected in the fetus' blood and plasma at higher levels than the maternal concentrations. It can be harmful to the developing fetus' brain and lungs. The liquid also contains artificial flavoring agents that can be harmful to the body. A pregnant mother can have issues that form during development of the baby due to nicotine like birth deformities or retardation. Many of the deformities can include the skull not fully forming, limbs forming partially, or cardiovascular issues.

==== Cocaine ====
Chemical structure of cocaine

Cocaine can act as a teratogen, having various effects on the developing fetus. Some common teratogenic defects caused by cocaine include hydronephrosis, cleft palate, polydactyly, and down syndrome. Cocaine as a drug has a low molecular weight and high water and lipid solubility which enables it to cross the placenta and fetal blood-brain barrier. Because cocaine is able to pass through the placenta and enter the fetus, the fetus' circulation can be negatively affected. With restriction of fetal circulation, the development of organs in the fetus can be impacted, even resulting in intestines developing outside of the fetus' body. Cocaine use during pregnancy can also result in obstetric labor complications such as preterm birth or delivery, uterine rupture, miscarriage, and stillbirth.

==== Marijuana ====
There is currently no reliable data to suggest that marijuana consistently acts as a teratogen. However, some studies show that it may have negative effects on the development of the fetus and consequent neurobehavioral outcomes. Frequent use of marijuana during pregnancy has been related to a reduction in birth weight, although the association is not strong. The neurodevelopmental effects include sleep disturbances, hyperactivity, increased delinquency, and worsened problem-solving. However, this data is not conclusive because there are a variety of other factors that tend to be associated with prenatal use of marijuana, including poorer economic status and exposure to other illicit drugs. Complications with maternal use of cannabis also stem from the fact that it is excreted into breast milk in small quantities and may harm motor development if fetal exposure is regular. It is advised that mothers refrain from using any products containing THC while they are breastfeeding or pregnant.

==== Caffeine ====
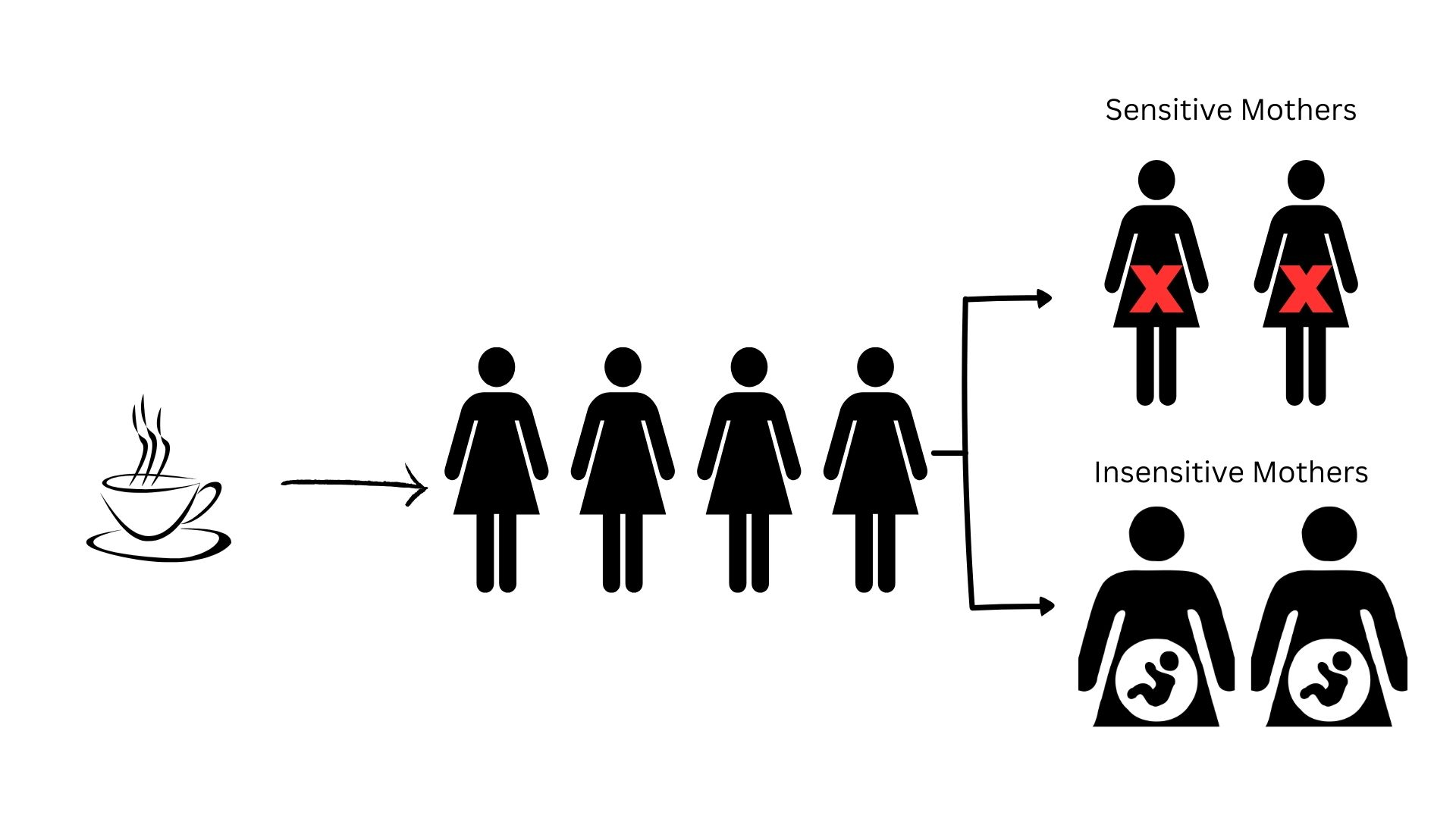
Only mothers who are deemed 'sensitive' will have negative effects of caffeine during pregnancy, while the rest of the population will have normal pregnancies.

Caffeine consumption during pregnancy has been linked to intrauterine growth retardation and spontaneous abortion during the first trimester. Other teratogenic effects include low birthweight, problems with neural tube development, decreased head circumference, excessive infant growth, and cognitive impairments at birth. Caffeine's chemical structure allows it to be transmitted across biological membranes, including the placental barrier, which is then transmitted to the developing embryo.

The inability to break down caffeine results in a build up of caffeine in the embryo. The build up of caffeine in embryos can produce teratogenic effects by blocking adenosine receptors, which regulate several neurotransmitters, including dopamine, serotonin, norepinephrine, and GABA. The teratogenic effects of caffeine are variable, and affects individuals differently depending on their sensitivity to caffeine. One mother may not have any teratogenic effects from caffeine consumption during pregnancy, while another could have significant complications.

=== Physical Agents as Teratogenic Agents ===
==== Heat ====
One example of a physical agent which may give rise to developmental complications is heat. Women may be exposed to heat from external sources such as extreme heat conditions and hot-tub exposures. External temperatures that exceed 102 °Fahrenheit (39 °Celsius) can give rise to fetal complications via the mechanism of neural tube malformation. The exact mechanisms relating heat to neural tube defects are not well-known. A potential theory connects heat to multiple cell-related issues, including cell movement, cell division, and apoptosis. The disruption in these normal processes may ultimately feed into the mechanism of neural tube malformation.

Another method of exposure to heat can be seen as a result of the pregnancy itself. This phenomenon can be associated with maternal weight gain as well the heat produced via fetal metabolism, both of which may cause dysregulation of heat escape. The exact mechanisms beyond these surface-level causes are not clear. One theory associates this heat with producing heat-shock proteins, which then disrupt a certain normal protein balance. This deviation from a normal protein balance may then interfere with fetal development. Another theory draws potential connections between elevated temperature, oxidative stress, and inflammation with blood flow restriction to the fetus.

==== Radiation ====
Although large exposures to radiation during pregnancies are often rare, when such exposures occur the resulting teratogenic complications occur due to various factors and/or mechanisms. The negative effects associated with radiation in general have to do with the interaction of said radiation with the stem cells of the developing fetus. There are also associations with DNA damage, oxidative stress responses, and changes in protein expression. In terms of ionizing radiation in particular, such forms of radiation often cause chemical changes to occur that yields abnormal chemical species. These chemical materials can then act on two different structures: they can either alter specific tissue-level structures in a predictable way, or act on DNA structures in a more random fashion.

==== Noise ====
While some ranges of sound are kept from reaching the fetus due to the presence of the mother's abdomen and uterus as barrier of sorts, there is still evidence that both high intensity sounds and continuous exposure to sound can be harmful to the fetus. Such sounds may bring about many potential problems within the fetus, including chromosomal abnormalities, altered social behavior after birth, and issues with hearing. In terms of hearing damage specifically, it is thought that these external sounds cause damage to the developing fetal cochlea and its constituent parts, particularly the inner and outer hairs of the structure.

==== Lead exposure ====
Long before modern science, it was understood that heavy metals could cause negative effects to those who were exposed. The Greek physician Pedanius Dioscorides described the effects of lead exposure as something that "makes the mind give way". Lead exposure in adults can lead to cardiological, renal, reproductive, and cognitive issues that are often irreversible, however, lead exposure during pregnancy can be detrimental to the long-term health of the fetus. Exposure to lead during pregnancy is well known to have teratogenic effects on the development of a fetus. Specifically, fetal exposure to lead can cause cognitive impairment, premature births, unplanned abortions, ADHD, and much more. Lead exposure during the first trimester of pregnancy leads to the greatest predictability of cognitive development issues after birth.

Low socioeconomic status correlates to a higher probability of lead exposure. A well-known recent example of lead poisoning — and the impacts it can have on a community — was the 2014 water crisis in Flint, Michigan. Researchers have found that female fetuses developed at a higher rate than male fetuses in Flint when compared to surrounding areas. The higher rate of female births indicated a problem because male fetuses are more sensitive to pregnancy hazards than female fetuses.

==== Phthalate exposure ====
Chemical structure of di(2-ethylhexyl) phthalate

Phthalate acid esters (PAEs) are a classification of chemical plasticizers used to increase flexibility in commercial plastics, such as polyethylene terephthalate (PET) and polyvinyl chloride (PVC). Phthalates are currently used in several consumer goods, including food packaging, cosmetics, clothing, fragrance, and toys. Additionally, they have wide-spread use in pharmaceutical and medical products, including in coatings and fillers of extend-release medications, blood bag packaging, tubes used in blood transfers, and hemodialysis units.

The most common phthalates include di(2-ethylhexyl) phthalate and di-n-butyl phthalate. As of 2017, di(2-ethylhexyl) phthalate is estimated to make up 30% of plastic produced in the United States and European Union, and up to 80% of plastic produced in China.

Several animal studies have been conducted to observe the specific effects of DEHP in vitro, including rats, mice, and chick embryos. Observed effects of high phthalate exposure in utero included neural tube malformations, encephalopathy, limb malformations, decreased vasculature, vascular malformations, decreased bodyweight and interuterine death at high concentrations. Higher concentrations of phthalates and phthalate metabolites have also been observed in the urine of mothers to children with neural tube malformations.

Phthalate exposure induces teratogenic effects through multiple mechanisms of action. High levels of di-(2-ethylhexyl)-phthalate create oxidative stress in utero, which results in cellular apoptosis in developing fetuses. In vivo, di-(2-ethylhexyl)-phthalate is hydrolyzed into 2-ethylhexanol. It's hypothesized that the metabolic byproduct of 2-ethylhexanol, ethylhexanoic acid, is the primary teratogen responsible for developmental defects in embryos exposed to di-(2-ethylhexyl)-phthalate.

The use of di-n-butyl phthalate in children's products was restricted in the United States in 2008, and is restricted in cosmetics in the European Union. Several phthalates, including di-n-butyl phthalate, di-n-hexyl phthalate, and butyl benzyl phthalate, were issued a Proposition 65 warning by the state of California in March, 2005 following evidence of reproductive toxicity and teratogenic effects.

==== Stress ====
Maternal stress has been associated with an increased risk of various birth defects, though a direct causal relationship has not been conclusively established. Studies suggest that the exposure to significant psychological stress or traumatic events during pregnancy may correlate with a higher incidence of congenital anomalies, such as oral facial cleft (cleft lip and palate), neural tube defects and conotruncal heart defects. One proposed mechanisms involves the dysregulation of maternal stress hormones, particularly glucocorticoids, which include cortisol and other corticosteroids. These hormones, often referred to as "stress hormones", are capable of crossing the placental barrier, but their effects on the fetus depends on the timing, duration, and intensity of exposure. The placenta expresses various enzymes, which metabolizes active cortisol into its inactive form, protecting the fetus. However extreme physiological responses or chronic stress could overwhelm this protective factor. Additionally, stress-induced changes in maternal physiology, such as reduced uteroplacental blood flow, inflammation, and oxidative stress, may further contribute to developmental disruptions. Sometimes, corticosteroids are used therapeutically to promote fetal lung maturation in preterm labor, excessive or prolonged exposure has been linked to intrauterine growth restriction and altered fetal programming. Further research is needed to clarify the exact role of maternal stress in teratogenesis and to determine the potential long-term impacts on offspring health.

=== Nutrient Deficiencies ===
Micronutrient deficiencies during pregnancy can contribute to teratogenesis by disrupting essential developmental processes. Deficiencies in folate, iodine, vitamin A, and other key nutrients have been linked to congenital anomalies, miscarriage, and impaired fetal growth. These deficiencies impair cellular differentiation, gene expression, and organogenesis, making proper maternal nutrition crucial for fetal development. Prevention strategies include dietary supplementation and food fortification programs to reduce the incidence of birth defects worldwide.

==== Folate Deficiency ====
Folate deficiency increases the risk of neural tube defects. It has been shown that supplementation of folate before, during, and after conception is able to reduce the risk of a fetus developing neural tube defects, cardiovascular malformations, cleft lip and palate, urogenital abnormalities, and reduced limb size.

==== Iodine Deficiency ====
In mothers, an iodine deficiency can lead to hypothyroidism, increasing the chances for miscarriage to occur. Hypothyroidism can also potentially cause growth problems in the baby, increasing the chances for preterm delivery. If the iodine deficiency is severe, the likelihood of stillbirth is increased as well as the child having the potential for increased hearing problems. Iodine deficiency has been associated with craniofacial and heart defects. The most severe cases of iodine deficiency caused hypothyroidism can result in cretinism.

==== Zinc Deficiency ====
Zinc deficiency can result in fetal death, intrauterine growth retardation, and teratogenesis. It can also have postnatal effects, such as behavioral abnormalities, elevated risk of high blood pressure, or impaired cognitive abilities.

== Other animals ==
=== Fossil record ===
Evidence for congenital deformities found in the fossil record is studied by paleopathologists, specialists in ancient disease and injury. Fossils bearing evidence of congenital deformity are scientifically significant because they can help scientists infer the evolutionary history of life's developmental processes. For instance, because a Tyrannosaurus rex specimen has been discovered with a block vertebra, it means that vertebrae have been developing the same basic way since at least the most recent common ancestor of dinosaurs and mammals. Other notable fossil deformities include a hatchling specimen of the bird-like dinosaur, Troodon, the tip of whose jaw was twisted. Another notably deformed fossil was a specimen of the Choristodera Hyphalosaurus, which had two heads- the oldest known example of polycephaly.

=== Thalidomide and chick limb development ===
Thalidomide is a teratogen known to be significantly detrimental to organ and limb development during embryogenesis. It has been observed in chick embryos that exposure to thalidomide can induce limb outgrowth deformities, due to increased oxidative stress interfering with the Wnt signaling pathway, increasing apoptosis, and damaging immature blood vessels in developing limb buds.

=== Retinoic acid and mouse limb development ===
Retinoic acid (RA) is significant in embryonic development. It induces the function of limb patterning of a developing embryo in species such as mice and other vertebrate limbs. For example, during the process of regenerating a newt limb an increased amount of RA moves the limb more proximal to the distal blastoma and the extent of the proximalization of the limb increases with the amount of RA present during the regeneration process. A study looked at the RA activity intracellularly in mice in relation to human regulating CYP26 enzymes which play a critical role in metabolizing RA. This study also helps to reveal that RA is significant in various aspects of limb development in an embryo, however irregular control or excess amounts of RA can have teratogenic impacts causing malformations of limb development. They looked specifically at CYP26B1 which is highly expressed in regions of limb development in mice. The lack of CYP26B1 was shown to cause a spread of RA signal towards the distal section of the limb causing proximo-distal patterning irregularities of the limb. Not only did it show spreading of RA but a deficiency in the CYP26B1 also showed an induced apoptosis effect in the developing mouse limb but delayed chondrocyte maturation, which are cells that secrete a cartilage matrix which is significant for limb structure. They also looked at what happened to development of the limbs in wild type mice, that are mice with no CYP26B1 deficiencies, but which had an excess amount of RA present in the embryo. The results showed a similar impact to limb patterning if the mice did have the CYP26B1 deficiency meaning that there was still a proximal distal patterning deficiency observed when excess RA was present. This then concludes that RA plays the role of a morphogen to identify proximal distal patterning of limb development in mice embryos and that CYP26B1 is significant to prevent apoptosis of those limb tissues to further proper development of mice limbs in vivo.

=== Rat development and lead exposure ===
There has been evidence of teratogenic effects of lead in rats as well. An experiment was conducted where pregnant rats were given drinking water, before and during pregnancy, that contained lead. Many detrimental effects, and signs of teratogenesis were found, such as negative impacts on the formation of the cerebellum, fetal mortality, and developmental issues for various parts of the body.

== Plants ==
In botany, teratology investigates the theoretical implications of abnormal specimens. For example, the discovery of abnormal flowers—for example, flowers with leaves instead of petals, or flowers with staminoid pistils—furnished important evidence for the "foliar theory", the theory that all flower parts are highly specialised leaves. In plants, such specimens are denoted as 'lusus naturae' ('sports of nature', abbreviated as 'lus.'); and occasionally as 'ter.', 'monst.', or 'monstr.'.

=== Types of deformations in plants ===
Plants can have mutations that leads to different types of deformations such as:

- Fasciation: Development of the apex (growing tip) in a flat plane perpendicular to the axis of elongation
- Variegation: Degeneration of genes, manifesting itself among other things by anomalous pigmentation
- Virescence: Anomalous development of a green pigmentation in unexpected parts of the plant
- Phyllody: Floral organs or fruits transformed into leaves
- Witch's broom: Unusually high multiplication of branches in the upper part of the plant, mainly in a tree
- Pelorism: Zygomorphic flower regress to their ancestral actinomorphic symmetry
- Proliferation: Repetitive growth of an entire organ, such as a flower

== Research ==
Studies designed to test the teratogenic potential of environmental agents use animal model systems (e.g., rat, mouse, rabbit, dog, and monkey). Early teratologists exposed pregnant animals to environmental agents and observed the fetuses for gross visceral and skeletal abnormalities. While this is still part of the teratological evaluation procedures today, the field of Teratology is moving to a more molecular level, seeking the mechanism(s) of action by which these agents act. One example of this is the use of mammalian animal models to evaluate the molecular role of teratogens in the development of embryonic populations, such as the neural crest, which can lead to the development of neurocristopathies. Genetically modified mice are commonly used for this purpose. In addition, pregnancy registries are large, prospective studies that monitor exposures women receive during their pregnancies and record the outcome of their births. These studies provide information about possible risks of medications or other exposures in human pregnancies. Prenatal alcohol exposure (PAE) can produce craniofacial malformations, a phenotype that is visible in Fetal Alcohol Syndrome. Current evidence suggests that craniofacial malformations occur via: apoptosis of neural crest cells, interference with neural crest cell migration, as well as the disruption of sonic hedgehog (shh) signaling.

Understanding how a teratogen causes its effect is not only important in preventing congenital abnormalities but also has the potential for developing new therapeutic drugs safe for use with pregnant women.

== See also ==
- Carcinogen
- Congenital abnormalities
- Mutagen
- Polydactyly
- Retinoic acid
- Teratoma
- Thalidomide
- Deformity

== Sources ==
- Gilbert SF (2015). Ecological Developmental Biology. Sinauer. ISBN 978-1-60535-344-9.
