= Gibberellic acid =

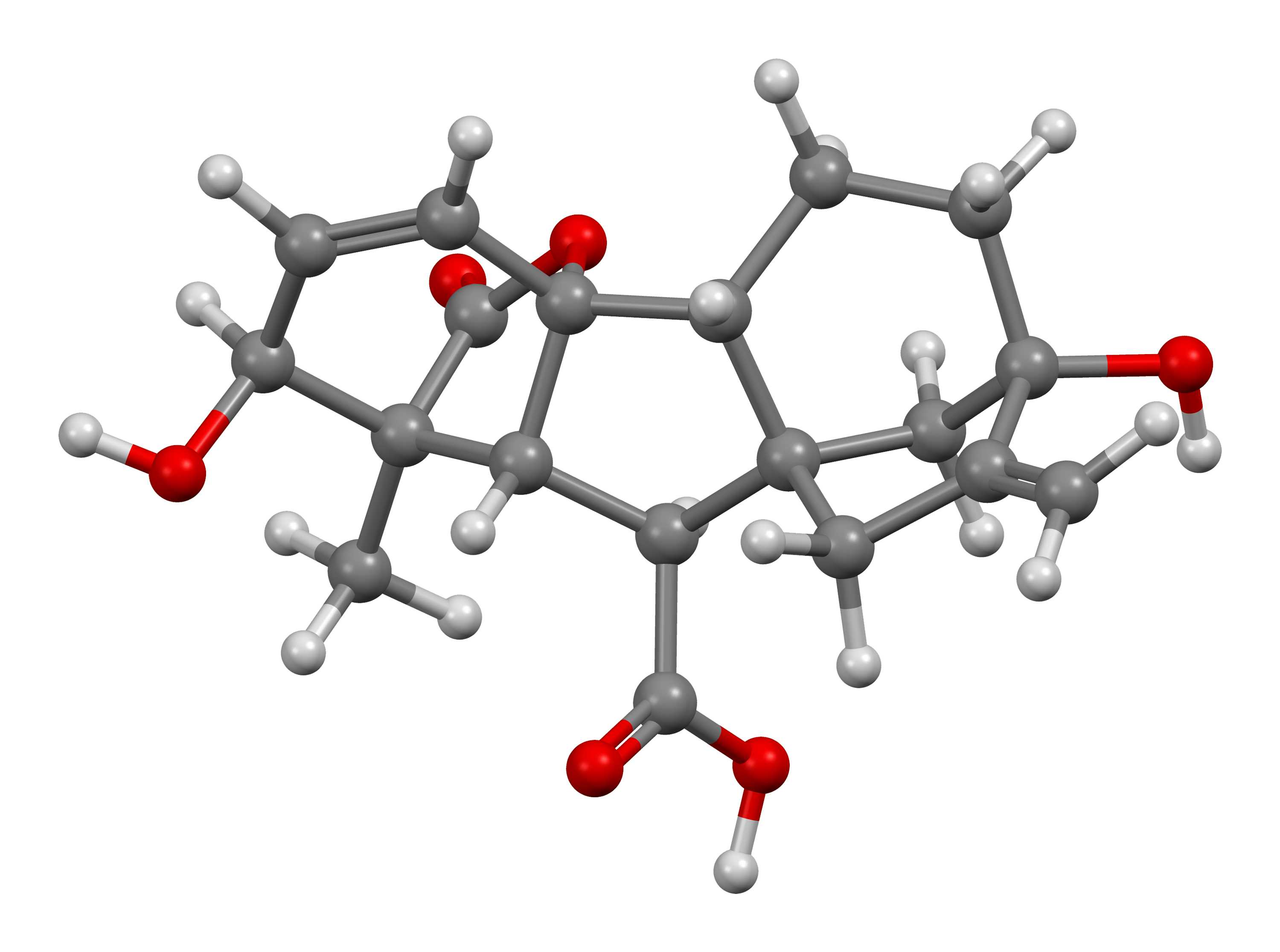

Names
- IUPAC name (3S,3aS,4S,4aS,7S,9aR,9bR,12S)-7,12-Dihydroxy-3-methyl-6-methylene-2-oxoperhydro-4a,7-methano-9b,3-propenoazuleno[1,2-b]furan-4-carboxylic acid

Identifiers
CAS Number	77-06-5
3D model (JSmol)	Interactive image
Beilstein Reference	54346
ChEBI	CHEBI:28833
ChEMBL	ChEMBL566653
ChemSpider	7995349
DrugBank	DB07814
ECHA InfoCard	100.000.911
EC Number	201-001-0
KEGG	C01699
PubChem CID	6466
UNII	BU0A7MWB6L
CompTox Dashboard (EPA)	DTXSID0020656
- InChI: InChI=1S/C19H22O6/c1-9-7-17-8-18(9,24)5-3-10(17)19-6-4-11(20)16(2,15(23)25-19)13(19)12(17)14(21)22/h4,6,10-13,20,24H,1,3,5,7-8H2,2H3,(H,21,22)/t10-,11+,12-,13-,16+,17+,18+,19-/m1/s1 Key: IXORZMNAPKEEDV-SNTJWBGVSA-N; InChI=1/C19H22O6/c1-9-7-17-8-18(9,24)5-3-10(17)19-6-4-11(20)16(2,15(23)25-19)13(19)12(17)14(21)22/h4,6,10-13,20,24H,1,3,5,7-8H2,2H3,(H,21,22)/t10-,11+,12-,13-,16+,17+,18+,19-/m1/s1 Key: IXORZMNAPKEEDV-SNTJWBGVBW
- SMILES: O=C1O[C@@]52\C=C/[C@H](O)[C@]1([C@H]5[C@H](C(=O)O)[C@]43[C@H]2CC[C@@](O)(C(=C)C3)C4)C

Properties
Chemical formula	C_{19}H_{22}O_{6}
Molar mass	346.379 g·mol^{−1}
Melting point	233 to 235 °C (451 to 455 °F; 506 to 508 K) (decomposition)
Solubility in water	5 g/L (20 °C)

Hazards
- GHS labelling
Pictograms	(GHS07: Exclamation mark)
Signal word	Warning
Hazard statements	H319
Precautionary statements	P264, P280, P305+P351+P338, P337+P313
- Except where otherwise noted, data are given for materials in their standard state (at 25 °C [77 °F], 100 kPa). verify (what is ?) Infobox references

Gibberellic acid (also called gibberellin A3 or GA_{3}) is a hormone found in plants and fungi. Its chemical formula is C_{19}H_{22}O_{6}. When purified, it is a white to pale-yellow solid.

Plants in their normal state produce large amounts of GA3. It is possible to produce the hormone industrially using microorganisms. Gibberellic acid is a simple gibberellin, a pentacyclic diterpene acid promoting growth and elongation of cells. It affects decomposition of plants and helps plants grow if used in small amounts, but eventually plants develop tolerance to it. GA stimulates the cells of germinating seeds to produce mRNA molecules that code for hydrolytic enzymes. Gibberellic acid is a very potent hormone whose natural occurrence in plants controls their development. Since GA regulates growth, applications of very low concentrations can have a profound effect while too much will have the opposite effect. It is usually used in concentrations between 0.01 and 10 mg/L.

GA was first identified in Japan in 1926, as a metabolic by-product of the plant pathogen Gibberella fujikuroi (thus the name), which afflicts rice plants. Fujikuroi-infected plants develop bakanae ("foolish seedling"), which causes them to rapidly elongate beyond their normal adult height. The plants subsequently lodge due to lack of support, and die.

Gibberellins have a number of effects on plant development. They can stimulate rapid stem and root growth, induce mitotic division in the leaves of some plants, and increase seed germination rates.

== Uses ==
Gibberellic acid is sometimes used in laboratory and greenhouse settings to trigger germination in seeds that would otherwise remain dormant. It is also widely used in the grape-growing industry as a hormone to induce the production of larger bunches and bigger grapes, especially Thompson seedless grapes. In the Okanagan and Creston valleys, it is also used as a growth regulator in the cherry industry.

Gibberellic acid is used commercially on Clementine Mandarin oranges to ensure a full and profitable crop of seedless fruit. To prevent the formation of seeds, Clementine groves must be isolated or netted to exclude foreign pollen from other citrus varieties. However, without cross-pollination, these trees naturally fail to set sufficient fruit, leading to very low yields. Applied directly onto the blossoms as a spray, GA stimulates the development of the fruit without the need for fertilization, guaranteeing a high yield of seedless fruit from the isolated trees.

It can be used to extend the shelf life of flowers and cut greens in floristry. The shelf life of cut shoots of Polygonatum multiflorum 'Variegatum' kept in water is about 7 days. To extend their life after cutting, conditioning with gibberellic acid or benzyladenine is used. This doubles their possible use.

GA is widely used in the barley malting industry. A GA solution is sprayed on the barley after the steeping process is completed. This stimulates growth in otherwise partly dormant kernels and produces a uniform and rapid growth.

== See also ==
- Abscisic acid (ABA)
- Gibberellin
- Plant hormone
- 6-Benzylaminopurine
- Auxin
