= Bakanae =

Fungal disease of rice

Bakanae (馬鹿苗、ばかなえ; [bakanae] BA-ka-NA-eh) or bakanae disease (Chinese: 馬鹿苗病, Japanese: 馬鹿苗病、ばかなえびょう, romanized: Bakanae-byou, [bakanaebʲoː]), from the Japanese for "foolish seedling", is a disease that infects rice plants. It is caused by the fungus Gibberella fujikuroi, the metabolism of which produces a surplus of gibberellic acid. In the plant, this acts as a growth hormone, causing hypertrophy. The affected plants, which are visibly etiolated (long and weak stems), chlorotic (lacking chlorophyll), and which are at best infertile with empty panicles, producing no edible grains; at worst, they are incapable of supporting their own weight, topple over, and die (hence "foolish seedling disease").

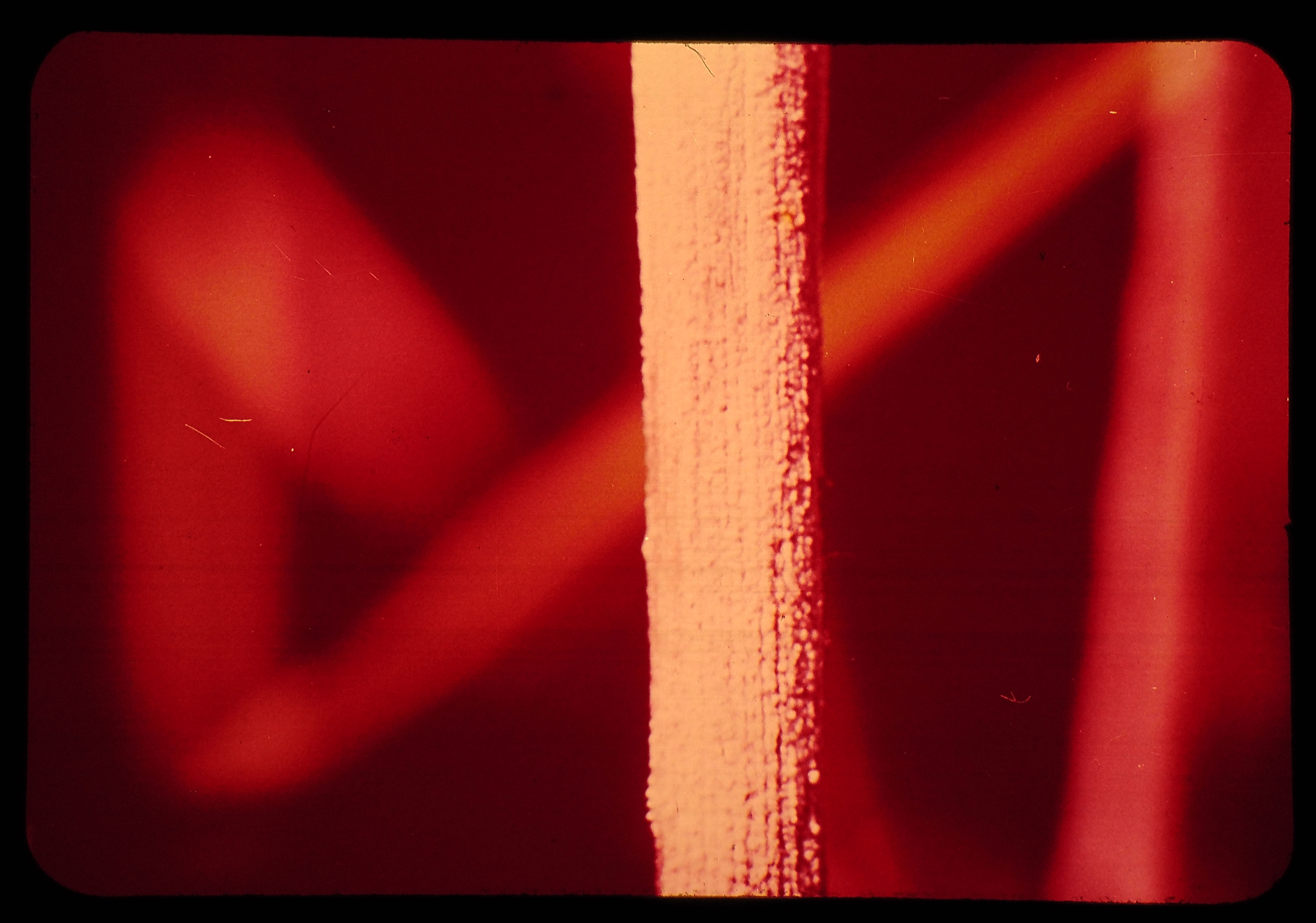
A rice stem affected by the bakanae disease at the sporulation stage.

The earliest known report of bakanae is from 1828; it was first described scientifically in 1898 by Japanese researcher Shotaro Hori, who showed that the causative agent was fungal.

The fungus affects rice crops in Asia, Africa, and North America. In epidemic cases yield losses may reach up to 20% or more. A 2003 publication from the International Rice Research Institute estimated that outbreaks of bakanae caused crop losses that were 20% to 50% in Japan, 15% in Thailand and 3.7% in India.
