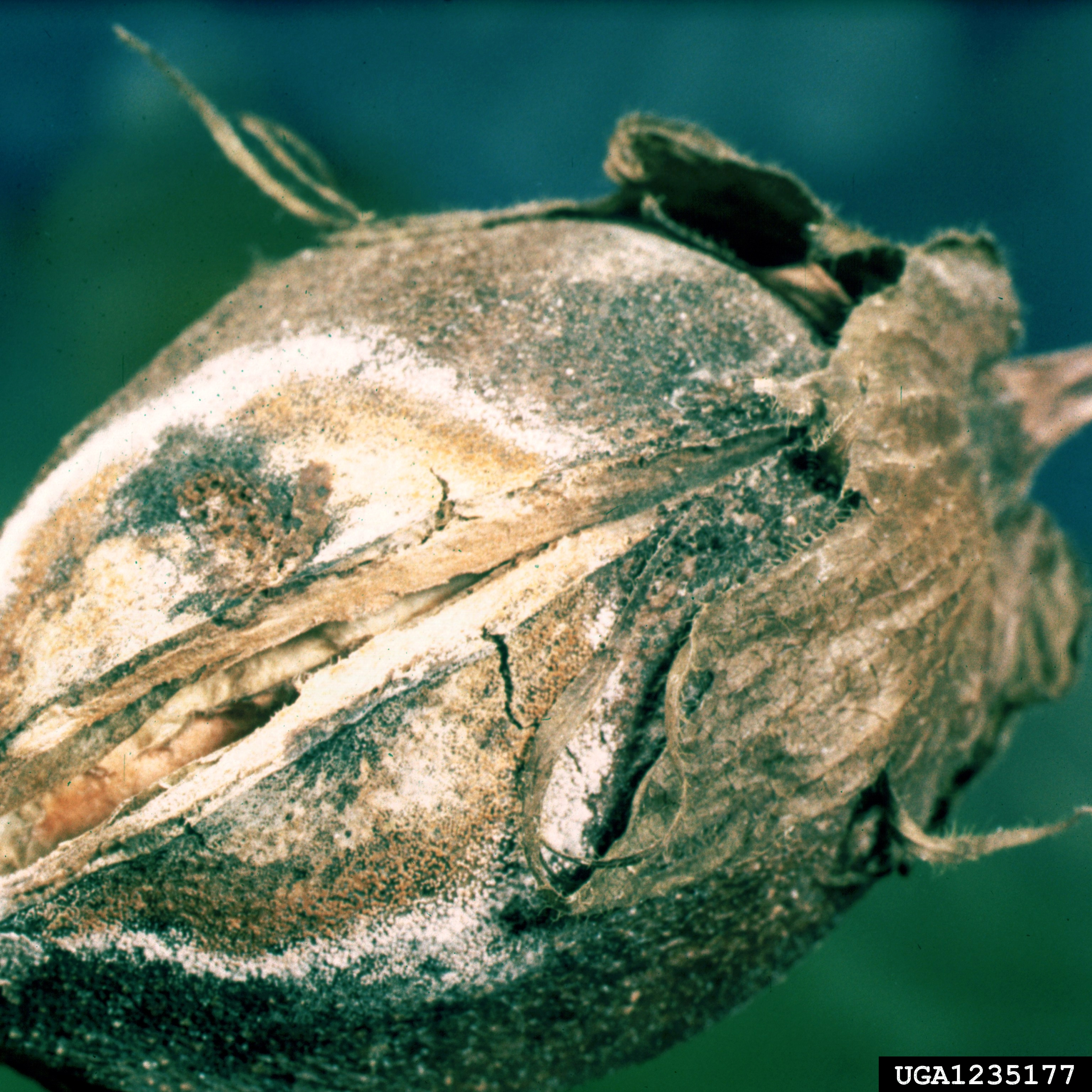

Scientific classification
- Kingdom: Fungi
- Division: Ascomycota
- Class: Sordariomycetes
- Order: Hypocreales
- Family: Nectriaceae
- Genus: Fusarium
- Species: F. fujikuroi

Binomial name
- Fusarium fujikuroi (Sawada) Wollenw., (1931)

Synonyms
- Fusarium moniliforme J. Sheld., (1904); Fusarium verticillioides (Sacc.) Nirenberg, (1976); Gibberella fujikuroi var. moniliformis (Wineland) Kuhlman, (1982); Gibberella moniliformis Wineland, (1924); Lisea fujikuroi Sawada, (1919); Oospora verticillioides Sacc., (1882)

= Gibberella fujikuroi =

Species of fungus

Fusarium fujikuroi, previously known as Gibberella fujikuroi is a fungal plant pathogen. It causes bakanae disease in rice seedlings.

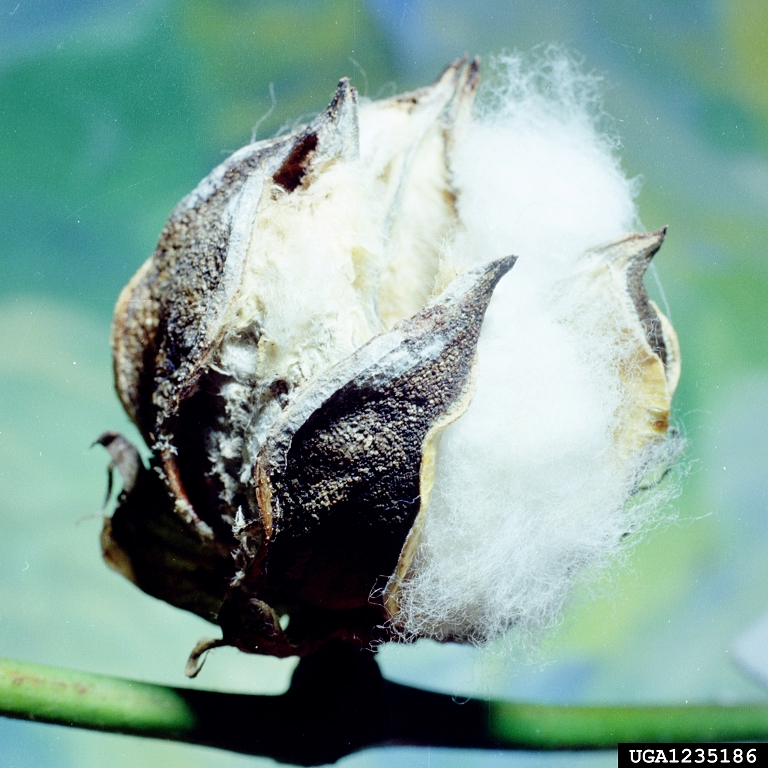
Cotton infected with bakanae disease

Another name is foolish seedling disease. It gets that name because the seeds can be infected, leading to disparate outcomes for the plant. There are not many diseases that initiate similar symptoms as bakanae.

== Hosts and symptoms ==
Fusarium fujikuroi is most widely known for causing disease and plant mortality in rice. Barley, millet, sugarcane and maize are also susceptible. Infection produces similar symptoms in all susceptible species, It was first described in rice. The stereotypical symptom of bakanae is the tall, spindly appearance of infected plants, caused by the fungus' secretion of gibberellins, a class of growth hormones in plants. This makes infected plants easy to pick out as they tend to rise above the rest of the healthy plants lacking the excessive stimulation of gibberellin. Other symptoms include chlorosis (leaves lacking chlorophyll), root lesions, stunting (rarely) or empty panicles in grains grown to maturity.

== Disease cycle ==
Fusarium fujikuroi is a polycyclic ascomycete. Thus, it is possible to, at the right stage of the lifecycle of the pathogen, see perithecia or conidia under the microscope. The pathogen overwinters in perithecia and will infect through soil in seeds that are not pre-infected. Infected seed is also a source of inoculum; conidia will germinate when planted. Infected seeds are the main way the disease is propagated. Symptoms can be observed during growing season.

== Environment ==
Bakanae is observed in all rice growing areas of the world. Thus, the pathogen thrives in the same growing conditions as rice. Rice requires a warm, wet growing season. Fields may even be flooded. The disease is known to be able to spread through water. Additionally, infected spores can be spread during harvesting. Thus, it is important to quarantine the infected seeds.

== Management ==
There have been many management solutions put forth, with the most important and widely used being the use of treated seeds. Growers should confer with the source of their seeds and as a second measure, check the weight of the seeds they receive. Lightweight seeds are typically infected. Seeds can also be treated to prevent pathogen activation. There are two options that have been found to be successful: hot water baths and chlorine treatments. However, one cannot be sure that the pathogen will be fully neutralized when subjected to these conditions.

Resistance in rice has also been studied. Specifically, the Binam cultivar has been found to be the most resistant to the disease, thus producing the largest yield in experiments when the disease was purposefully induced. Other varieties have shown partial resistance, but none as strong as Binam.

One new option that is under investigation for management potential is treating the seeds with silver nanoparticles. The particles are a known antifungal that are not toxic to humans. In one study, treatment with the particles reduced the incidence of the disease significantly.

== Importance ==
In rice crops, this disease has made a staggering economic impact. Losses have been specifically high in Asian countries, namely India, Thailand, and Japan. Specifically, Basmati rice has been a main target for Fusarium fujikuroi. At times, growers have lost up to 50% of their crop. However, rates of disease are not often so high and only occur during epidemic years.

Luckily, attempts at management have found success in the past and new treatments are continually researched. Growers can be confident that they will find an option to deal with this disease if it is present in their crop, if not initially, then hopefully by the next growing season.

== Pathogenesis ==
The pathogen induces excessive gibberellin production in the plant, resulting in the rapid growth of the hosts. The amount of Gibberellin is important in determining the extent of the disease. Another interaction between the plant and pathogen is the sporulation of mycelium at the lower levels of the plant - white fungal masses can be observed. Conidia, the secondary inoculum, are the result of these spore masses.
