= 6-Benzylaminopurine =

Plant growth hormone

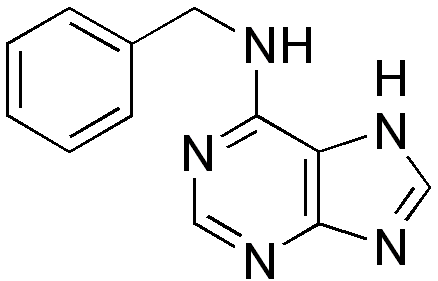

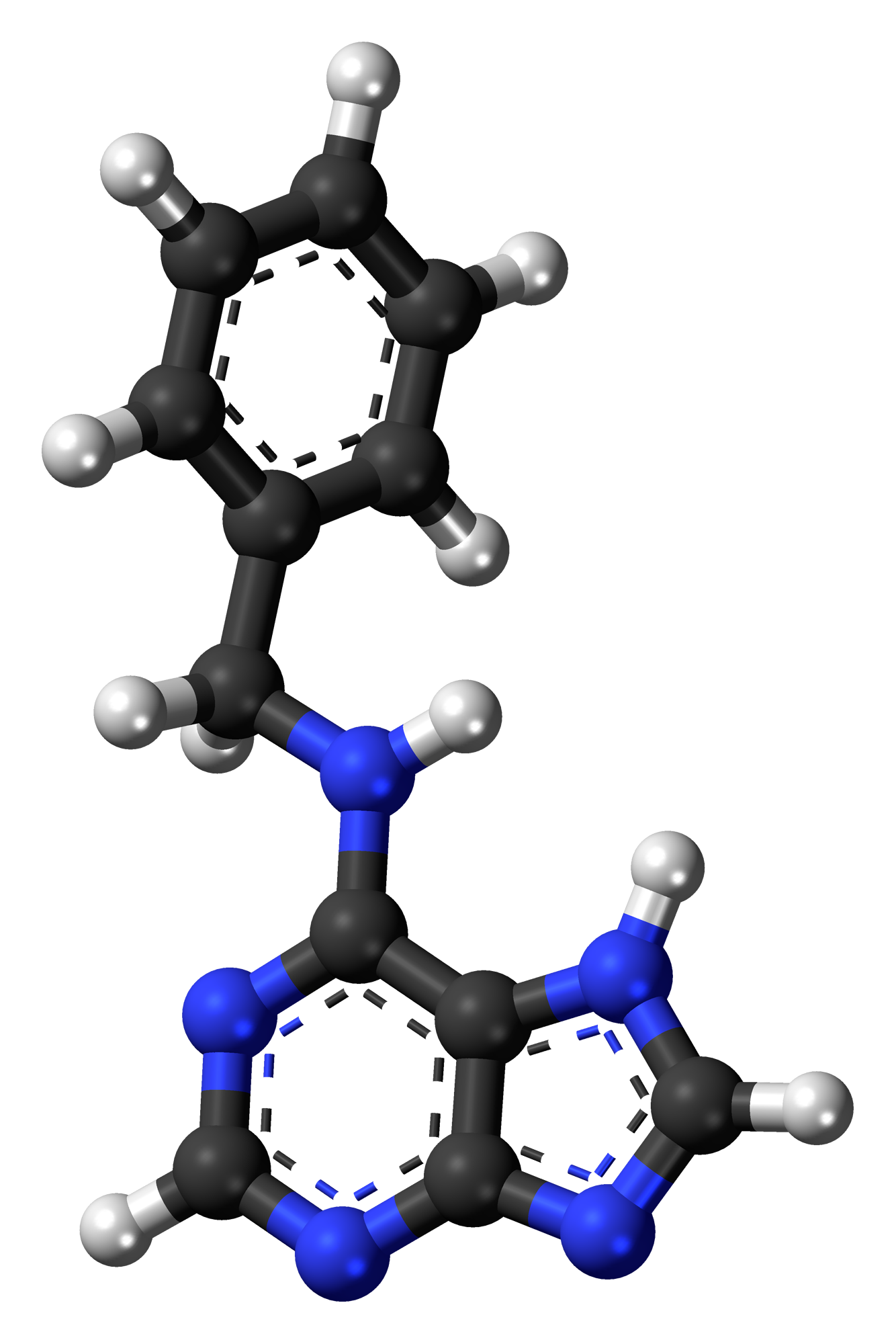

Names
- Systematic IUPAC name N-(Phenylmethyl)-7H-purin-6-amine
- Other names Benzyl adenine; 6-Benzyladenine

Identifiers
CAS Number	1214-39-7
3D model (JSmol)	Interactive image
ChEBI	CHEBI:29022
ChEMBL	ChEMBL228862
ChemSpider	56177
ECHA InfoCard	100.013.570
KEGG	C11263
PubChem CID	62389
UNII	KXG6A989PS
CompTox Dashboard (EPA)	DTXSID7032630
- InChI: InChI=1S/C12H11N5/c1-2-4-9(5-3-1)6-13-11-10-12(15-7-14-10)17-8-16-11/h1-5,7-8H,6H2,(H2,13,14,15,16,17) Key: NWBJYWHLCVSVIJ-UHFFFAOYSA-N; InChI=1/C12H11N5/c1-2-4-9(5-3-1)6-13-11-10-12(15-7-14-10)17-8-16-11/h1-5,7-8H,6H2,(H2,13,14,15,16,17) Key: NWBJYWHLCVSVIJ-UHFFFAOYAZ
- SMILES: c3ccc(CNc1ncnc2[nH]cnc12)cc3

Properties
Chemical formula	C_{12}H_{11}N_{5}
Molar mass	225.255 g·mol^{−1}
Appearance	White to off-white powder
Solubility in water	0.44 g/L (15°C)

Hazards
Safety data sheet (SDS)	External MSDS
- Except where otherwise noted, data are given for materials in their standard state (at 25 °C [77 °F], 100 kPa). Infobox references

6-Benzylaminopurine, benzyl adenine, BAP or BA is a first-generation synthetic cytokinin that elicits plant growth and development responses, setting blossoms and stimulating fruit richness by stimulating cell division. It is an inhibitor of respiratory kinase in plants, and increases post-harvest life of green vegetables. Influence of cytokinin as 6-benzylaminopurine (BAP) in combination with other methods on postharvest green color retention on broccoli heads and asparagus spears, showed positive results for quality retention. Treatment with 10 and 15 ppm BAP can be used to extend shelf life of fresh-cut broccoli florets and shredded cabbage during storage at 6±1°C at commercial level.

It can be used to extend the shelf life of flowers and cut greens in floristry. The shelf life of cut shoots of Polygonatum multiflorum 'Variegatum' kept in water is about 7 days. To extend their life after cutting, conditioning with gibberellic acid or BA is used. This doubles their possible use.

6-Benzylaminopurine was first synthesized and tested in the laboratories of plant physiologist Folke K. Skoog.

== See also ==
- Plant hormone
- Gibberellic acid
