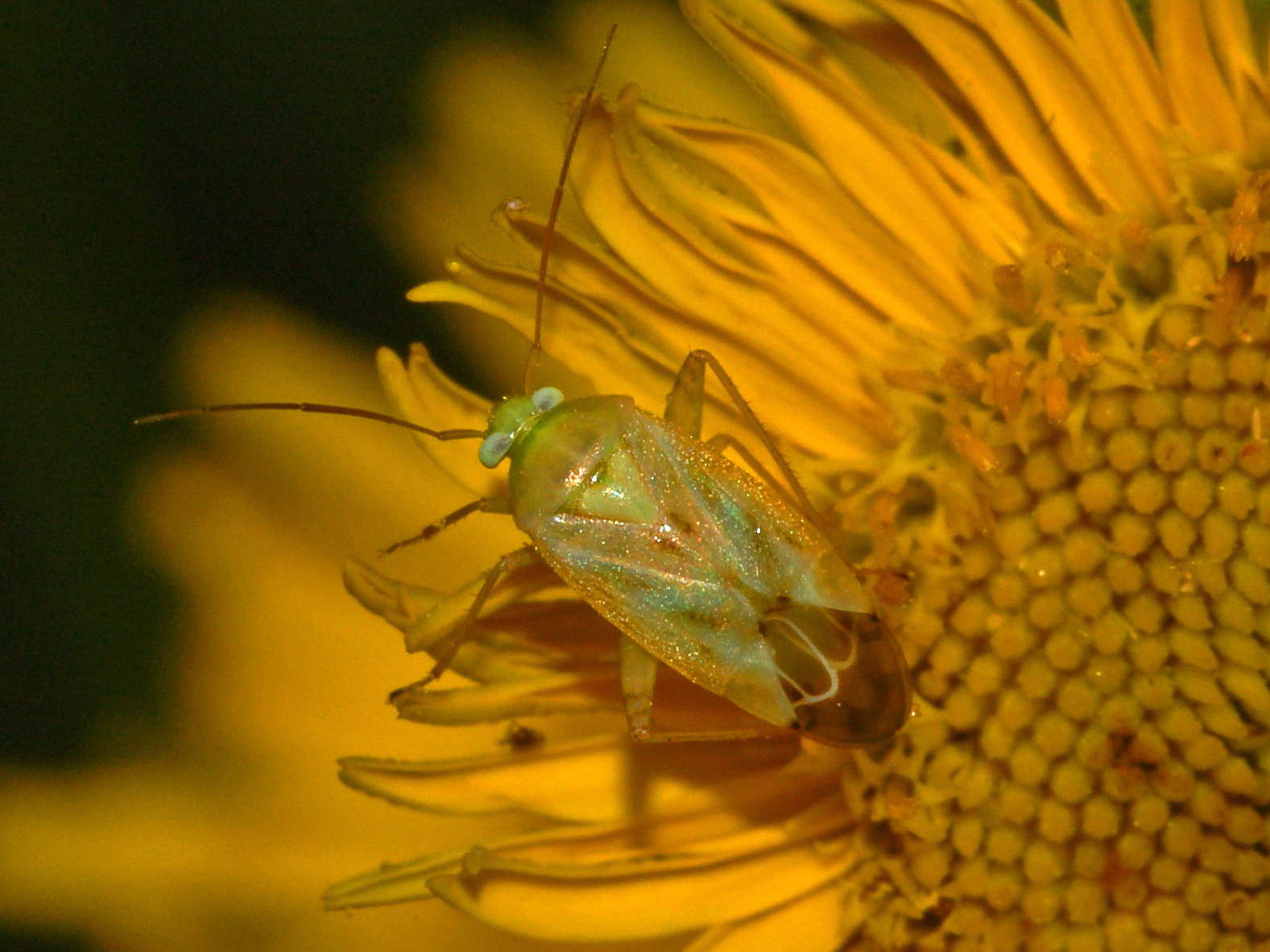
- Adult of Taylorilygus apicalis

Scientific classification
- Kingdom: Animalia
- Phylum: Arthropoda
- Class: Insecta
- Order: Hemiptera
- Suborder: Heteroptera
- Family: Miridae
- Subfamily: Mirinae
- Tribe: Mirini
- Genus: Taylorilygus
- Species: T. apicalis

Binomial name
- Taylorilygus apicalis (Fieber, 1861)

Synonyms
- Taylorilygus prasinus (Reuter, 1876); Allorhinocoris prasinus (Reuter, 1876)

= Taylorilygus apicalis =

Species of true bug

Taylorilygus apicalis or broken-backed bug is a species of plant bug in the family Miridae.

== Distribution ==
This species is widespread in most of Europe, in the Afrotropical realm, in the Australasian realm, in the Neotropical realm, in the Oriental realm, in North America and in Oceania.

== Description ==
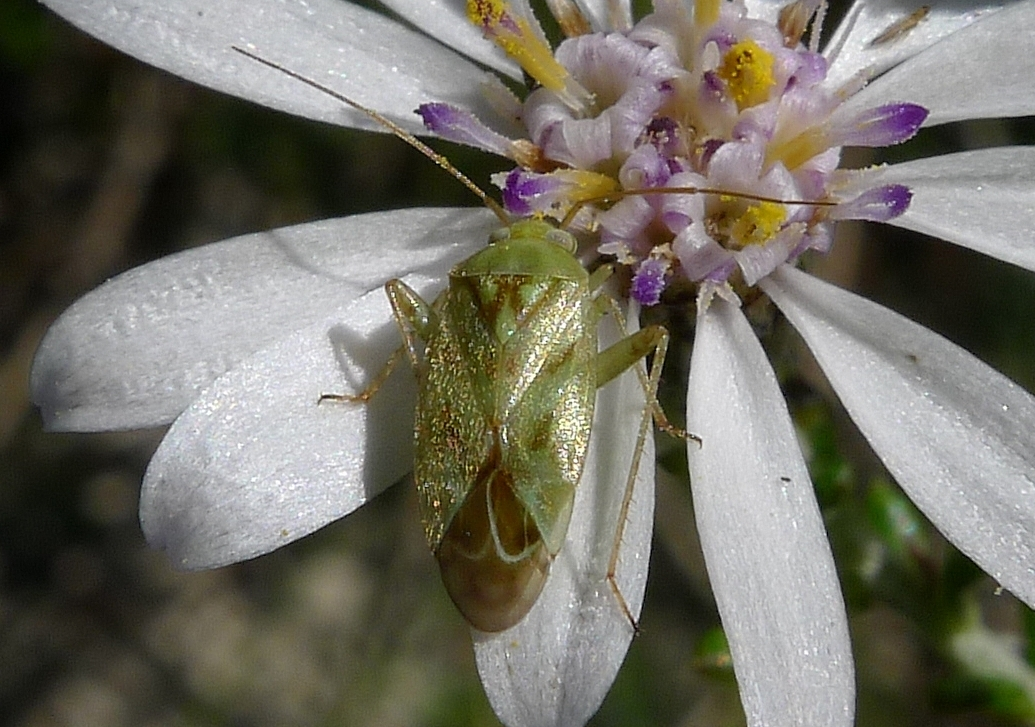
Broken-backed bug

Taylorilygus apicalis can reach a length of about 4–5 millimetres (0.16–0.20 in). These very common bugs are usually light green, but may also be tan, with mainly brown outer wings and brown flecks on the inner wings. Wing tips appear bent down at 45° (hence the common name of broken-backed bugs). The eyes are white or light-colored. They show a very slender pronotal collar and an elaborately spined extra projection of the left paramere.

== Biology ==
These plant bugs are polyphagous, but they mainly feed on Asteraceae species, Anthemis and Salix species. The broken-backed bugs are vectors of a phytoplasma-caused phyllody in species of Parthenium.

== Bibliography ==
- Nishida, Gordon M., ed. (2002) Hawaiian Terrestrial Arthropod Checklist, 4th ed., Bishop Museum Technical Reports no. 22
- Roques A., Kenis M., Lees D., Lopez-Vaamonde C., Rabitsch W., Rasplus J.-Y., Roy D., eds. 2010. BioRisk 4 Special Issue; 2 vols., 1028 pp.
- Schuh, R.T. 2002–2013. On-line Systematic Catalog of Plant Bugs (Insecta: Heteroptera: Miridae).
- Schwartz, Michael D., and G. G. E. Scudder (2000) Miridae (Heteroptera) new to Canada, with some taxonomic changes, Journal of the New York Entomological Society, vol. 108, no. 3-4
