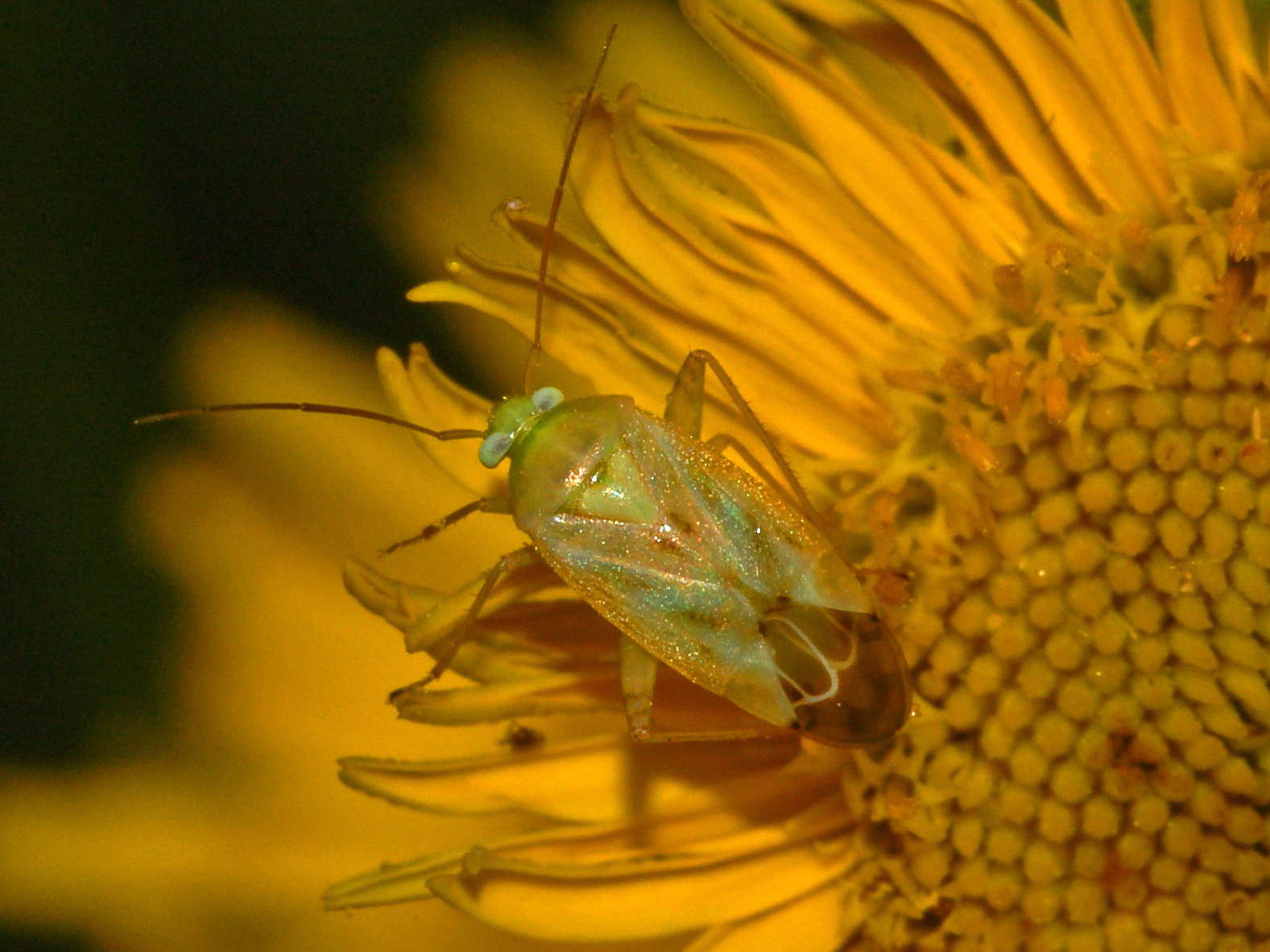
- Taylorilygus apicalis

Scientific classification
- Kingdom: Animalia
- Phylum: Arthropoda
- Class: Insecta
- Order: Hemiptera
- Suborder: Heteroptera
- Family: Miridae
- Tribe: Mirini
- Genus: Taylorilygus; Leston, 1952

= Taylorilygus =

Genus of true bugs

Taylorilygus is a genus of jumping tree bugs in the family Miridae. There are more than 40 described species in Taylorilygus.

Taylorilygus apicalis, the broken-backed bug, is found on every continent except Antarctica, and is common in North America. Most of the other species are found in Africa; a few in Asia, Europe, or Australia.

== Species ==
These 43 species belong to the genus Taylorilygus:

- Taylorilygus apicalis (Fieber, 1861) (worldwide)
- Taylorilygus arboreus (T. Taylor, 1947) (Sudan, Uganda)
- Taylorilygus aristogeiton Linnavuori, 1974 (Nigeria)
- Taylorilygus atratus (Poppius, 1910) (Kilimanjaro)
- Taylorilygus caucanthus Linnavuori, 1975 (Ethiopia)
- Taylorilygus chagweensis (Poppius, 1914) (Uganda)
- Taylorilygus compactus Linnavuori, 1975 (Ethiopia)
- Taylorilygus complexus (T. Taylor, 1947) (Uganda)
- Taylorilygus compositus (T. Taylor, 1947) (Uganda)
- Taylorilygus cupressus (T. Taylor, 1947) (Uganda)
- Taylorilygus definitus (T. Taylor, 1947) (Uganda)
- Taylorilygus dispar Linnavuori, 1975 (Ethiopia)
- Taylorilygus divergens (Reuter, 1901) (Israel, Syria)
- Taylorilygus entadae (T. Taylor, 1947) (Uganda)
- Taylorilygus figuratus Linnavuori, 1975 (Ethiopia)
- Taylorilygus ghesquierei (Schouteden, 1937) (Belgian Congo)
- Taylorilygus indecorus (T. Taylor, 1947) (Kenya)
- Taylorilygus infirmus (T. Taylor, 1947) (Sudan, Uganda)
- Taylorilygus lindbergi Kerzhner & Schuh, 1998 (Cape Verde)
- Taylorilygus longicornis Linnavuori, 1975 (Ethiopia)
- Taylorilygus maia Linnavuori & van Harten, 2001 (Yemen)
- Taylorilygus morosus Linnavuori, 1975 (Yemen)
- Taylorilygus nairobiensis (Poppius, 1912) (Africa)
- Taylorilygus nebulosus (Poppius, 1914) (Australia)
- Taylorilygus notatus (T. Taylor, 1947) (Cape Verde, Sudan, Uganda)
- Taylorilygus nyanzae (Poppius, 1914) (Africa)
- Taylorilygus obscuratus (Poppius, 1910) (Kilimanjaro; Uganda)
- Taylorilygus obscuripes (Poppius, 1914) (Africa)
- Taylorilygus oceanicus (Poppius, 1914) (New Hebrides)
- Taylorilygus olivaceus Linnavuori, 1973 (Zaire)
- Taylorilygus ornaticollis (Reuter, 1908) (Java; Taiwan)
- Taylorilygus pseudopunctatus Linnavuori, 1975 (Ethiopia)
- Taylorilygus ricini (T. Taylor, 1947) (Uganda)
- Taylorilygus rubripes Linnavuori & van Harten, 2001 (Somalia)
- Taylorilygus simonyi (Reuter, 1903) (Africa, southwest Asia)
- Taylorilygus spec (Fieber, 1861) Fieber, 1861
- Taylorilygus subdivergens Linnavuori, 1974 (Yemen)
- Taylorilygus suturalis Linnavuori, 1975 (Sudan)
- Taylorilygus tessellatus Linnavuori, 1975 (Sudan; Somalia)
- Taylorilygus thomasi (Reuter, 1907) (Africa)
- Taylorilygus vernoniae (T. Taylor, 1947) (Uganda)
- Taylorilygus virens (T. Taylor, 1947) (Uganda)
- Taylorilygus vosseleri (Poppius, 1912) (Africa)
