= Virescence =

Abnormal greening of plant parts

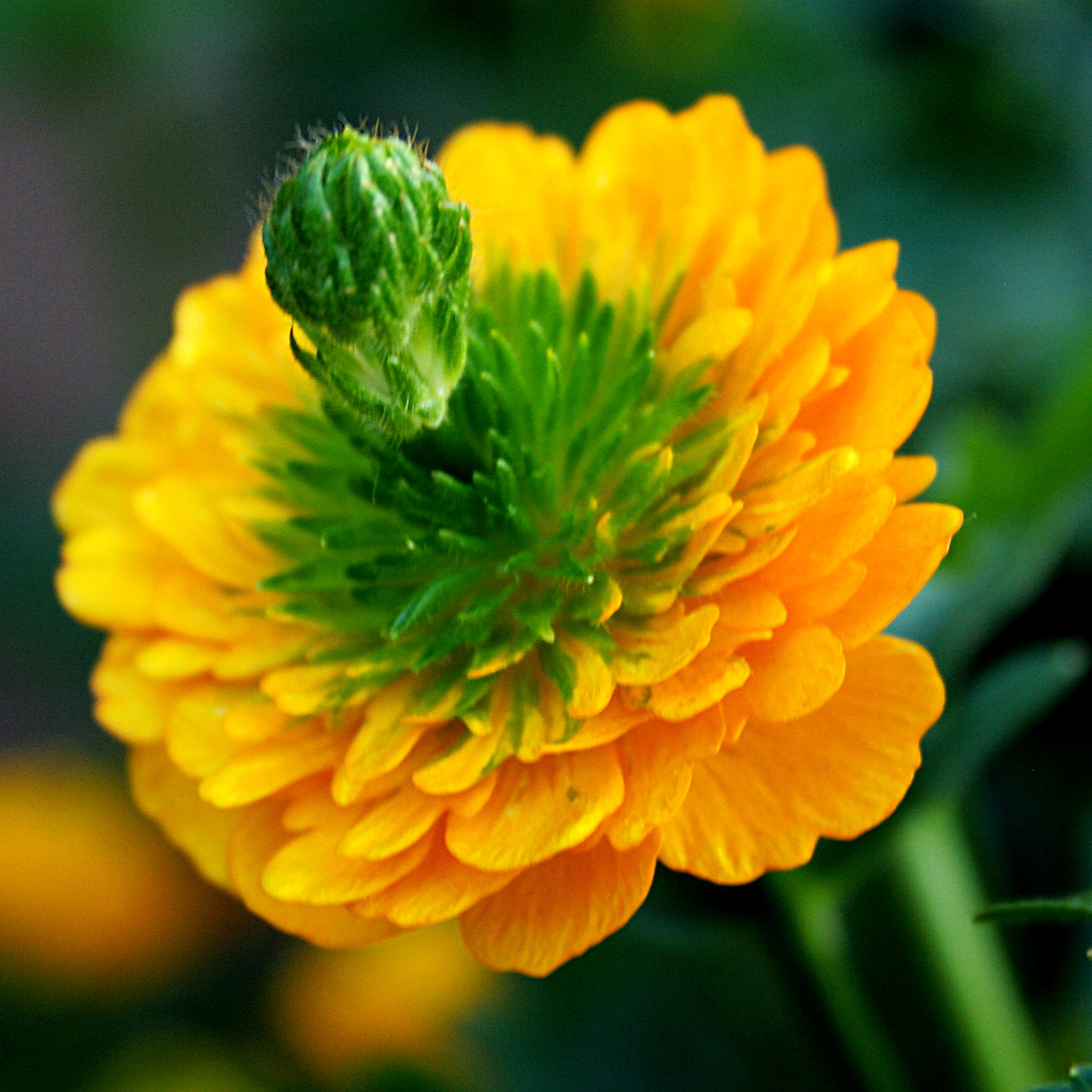
Virescence and phyllody in Ranunculus bulbosus

Virescence is the abnormal development of green pigmentation in plant parts that are not normally green, like shoots or flowers (in which case it is known as floral virescence). Virescence is closely associated with phyllody (the abnormal development of flower parts into leaves) and witch's broom (the abnormal growth of a dense mass of shoots from a single point). They are often symptoms of the same disease affecting the plants, typically those caused by phytoplasmas. The term chloranthy is also sometimes used for floral virescence, though it is more commonly used for phyllody.

The term was coined around 1825, from Latin virescere, "to become green". In the English language the term virescent may also refer to greenness (cf. verdant).

== Cause ==
The main cause of virescence is the presence of phytoplasma, pathogenic microorganisms that infect plants and disrupt their growth. Phytoplasmas often alter normal processes in plants, such as flower color development, leading to virescence. However, there are cases where green flower coloration can also be attributed to genetic factors within the plant itself.

Diagnosing it can be challenging in some cases, as naturally green-colored flowers and genetic factors modifying anthocyanin distribution in plants can mimic its symptoms. For instance, it can be observed in certain Chinese rose varieties and specific clones of periwinkle. While the most notable phytoplasma-associated diseases are commonly reported in commercially grown flowering species, virescence also affects horticultural and seed crops, including tomatoes, cabbages, strawberries, and clover, among others.

== Impact ==
The impacts of virescence can vary depending on the type of plant affected. In commercial flowering plants, virescence can reduce the aesthetic appeal of flowers, potentially impacting their market value and attractiveness to buyers. Additionally, virescence can serve as an indicator of phytoplasma infection, which can cause significant production losses in agricultural and horticultural crops. Therefore, a better understanding of virescence and its influencing factors is crucial for plant disease control and sustainable agriculture management.

== See also ==
- Chlorosis
- Forest pathology
- Phytopathology
