= Chlorosis =

Medical condition in plants

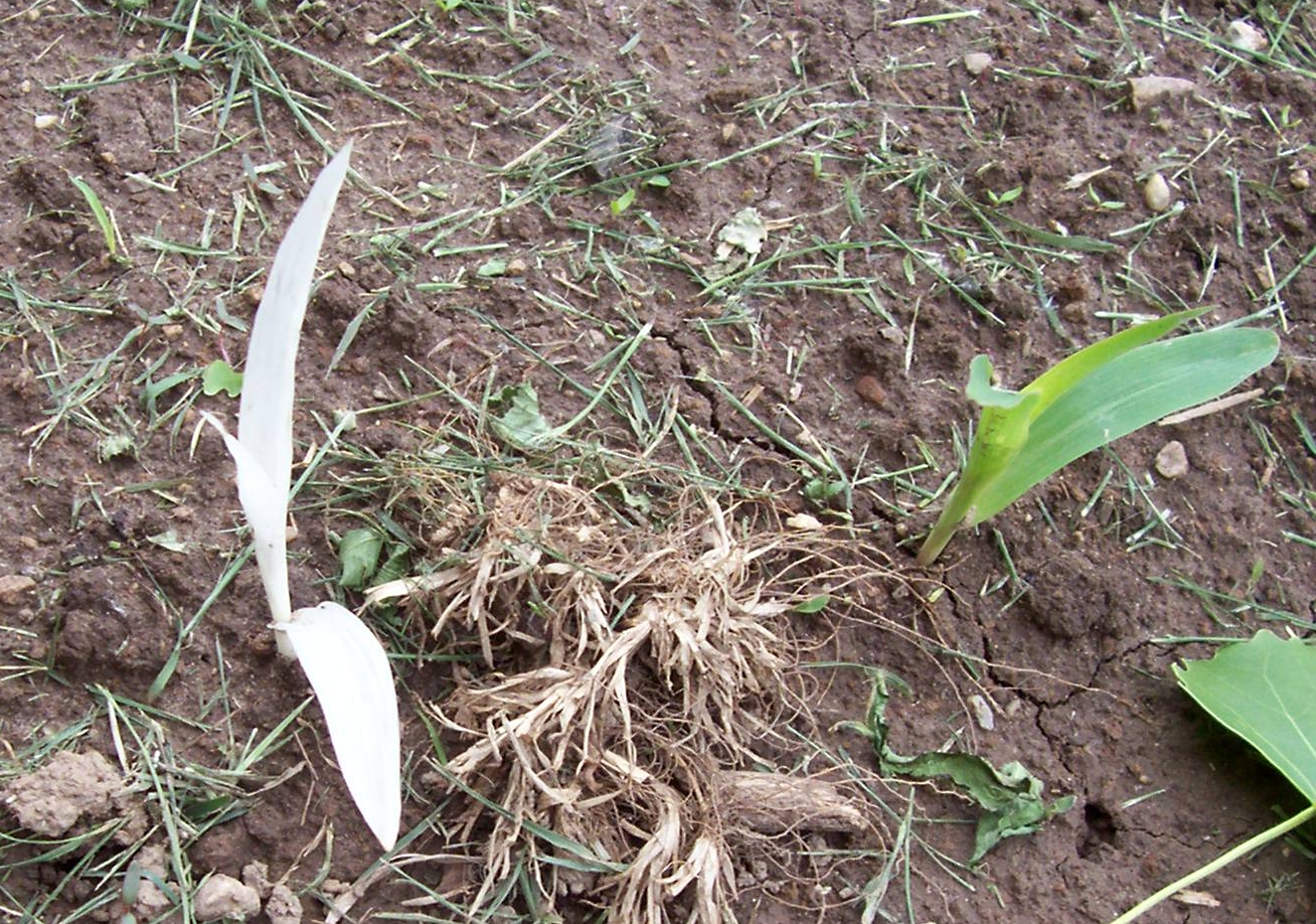
An albino corn plant with no chlorophyll (left) beside a normal plant (right)

In botany, chlorosis is a condition in which leaves produce insufficient chlorophyll. As chlorophyll is responsible for the green color of leaves, chlorotic leaves are pale, yellow, or yellow-white. The affected plant has little or no ability to manufacture carbohydrates through photosynthesis and may die unless the cause of its chlorophyll insufficiency is treated and this may lead to a plant disease called rusts, although some chlorotic plants, such as the albino Arabidopsis thaliana mutant ppi2, are viable if supplied with exogenous sucrose.

The word chlorosis is derived from the Greek khloros meaning "greenish-yellow", "pale green", "pale", "pallid", or "fresh".

In viticulture, the most common symptom of poor nutrition in grapevines is the yellowing of grape leaves caused by chlorosis and the subsequent loss of chlorophyll. This is often seen in vineyard soils that are high in limestone such as the Italian wine region of Barolo in the Piedmont, the Spanish wine region of Rioja and the French wine regions of Champagne and Burgundy. In these soils the grapevine often struggles to pull sufficient levels of iron which is a needed component in the production of chlorophyll.

== Causes ==
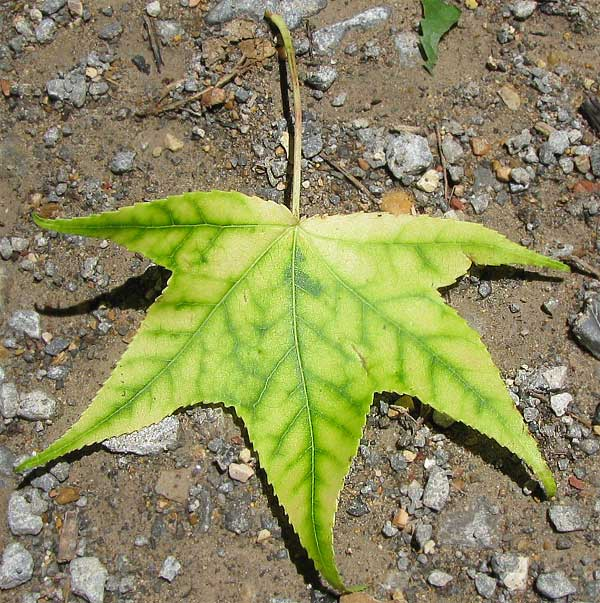
A Liquidambar leaf with interveinal chlorosis

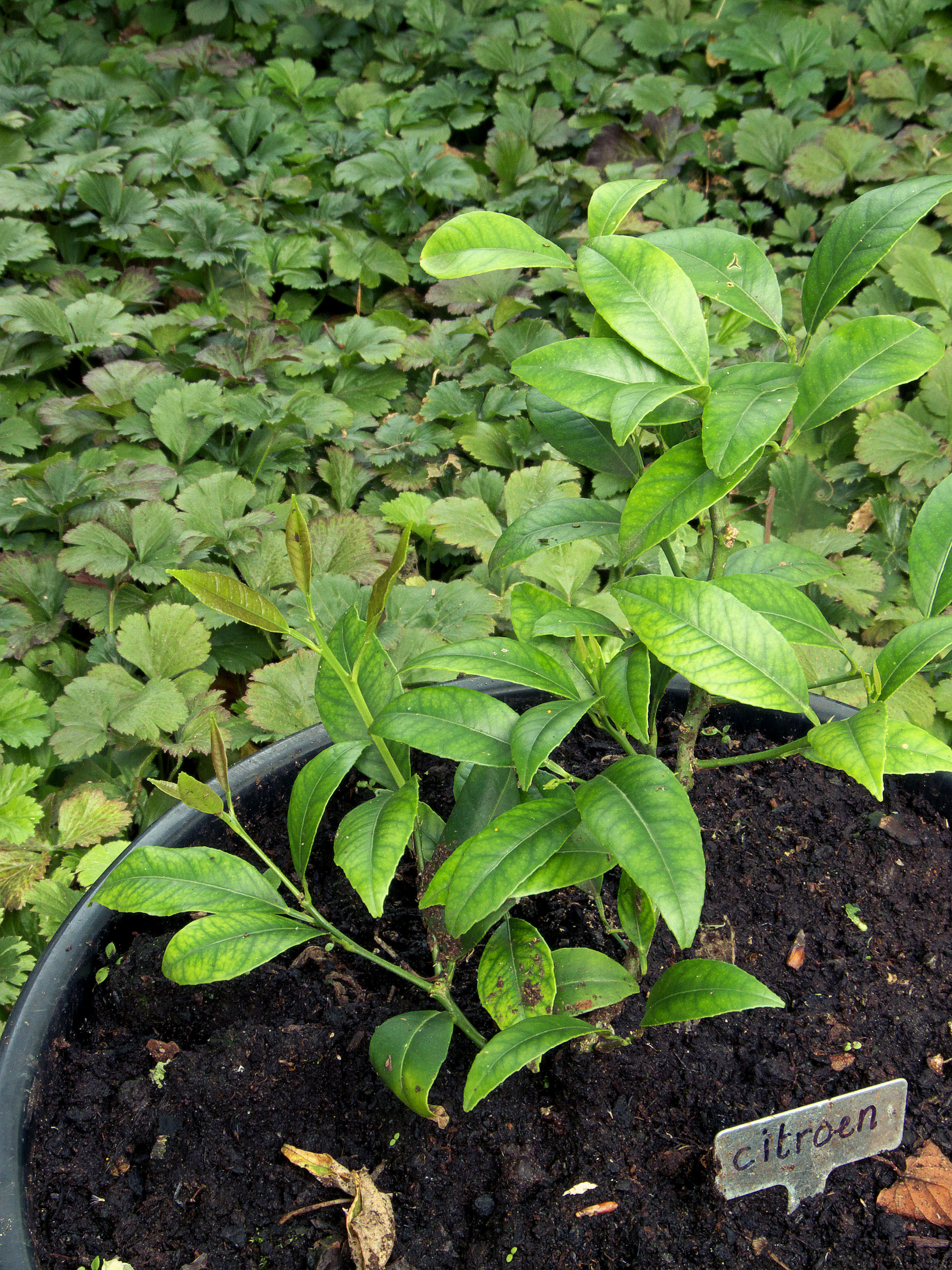
Lemon shrub with chlorosis

Chlorosis is typically caused when leaves do not have enough nutrients to synthesise all the chlorophyll they need. It can be brought about by a combination of factors including:

- a specific mineral deficiency in the soil, such as iron, magnesium or zinc
- deficient nitrogen and/or proteins
- a soil pH at which minerals become unavailable for absorption by the roots
- poor drainage (waterlogged roots)
- damaged and/or compacted roots
- pesticides and particularly herbicides may cause chlorosis, both to target weeds and occasionally to the crop being treated.
- exposure to sulphur dioxide
- ozone injury to sensitive plants
- presence of any number of bacterial pathogens, for instance Pseudomonas syringae pv. tagetis that causes complete chlorosis on Asteraceae
- fungal infection, e.g. Bakanae.

However, the exact conditions vary from plant type to plant type. For example, Azaleas grow best in acidic soil and rice is unharmed by waterlogged soil.

== In grape vines ==
Like many other plants, grape vines are susceptible to chlorosis, and symptoms of iron deficiency tend to be common on soils rich in limestone. In the wake of The Great French Wine Blight, when European Vitis vinifera were affected by Phylloxera, chlorosis became a greater problem in viticulture. To deal with the Phylloxera blight, V. vinifera was grafted onto rootstock based on American species of the genus Vitis, such as Vitis riparia, Vitis rupestris, and Vitis berlandieri. However, many of these were less adapted to the lime-rich soils that were common in France's vineyards, in particular many of those that produced wines of top quality. Many grafted vines in lime-rich vineyards therefore showed signs of iron deficiency, and in France this specific form of chlorosis was termed chlorose calcaire. The problem was largely overcome by the selection of lime-resistant American vines as basis for hybrid vines used for rootstock material. However, since such rootstocks may be less than optimal in other respects, it is necessary for the viticulturalist to balance the need for chlorosis resistance against other viticultural needs. This is illustrated by one of the most common lime-resistant rootstocks, 41 B, which is a hybrid between V. vinifera cultivar Chasselas and V. berlandieri, which generally has a sufficient, but not extremely high, Phylloxera resistance.

== Treatments ==
Specific nutrient deficiencies (often aggravated by high soil pH) may be corrected by supplemental feedings of iron, in the form of a chelate or sulphate, magnesium or nitrogen compounds in various combinations. If the soil is too acidic, applying lime can raise the pH to the proper range, making more nutrients available to the plant. Likewise, sulfur can be used to lower soil pH if it is too alkaline.

== See also ==
- Forest pathology
- Phytopathology
- Virescence
