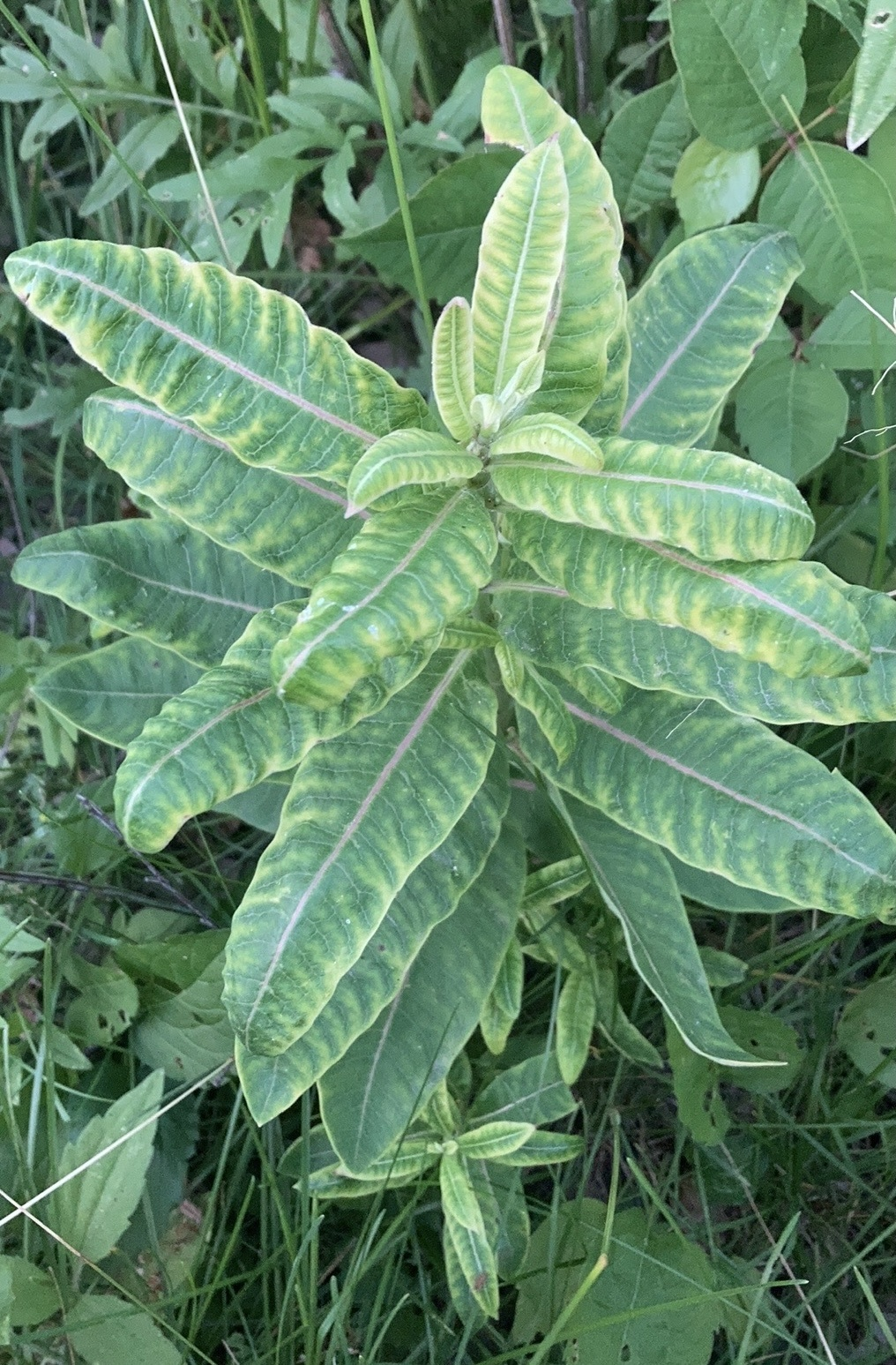

Scientific classification
- Domain: Bacteria
- Kingdom: Bacillati
- Phylum: Mycoplasmatota
- Class: Mollicutes
- Order: Acholeplasmatales
- Family: Acholeplasmataceae
- Genus: Candidatus Phytoplasma
- Species: Milkweed yellows phytoplasma

Binomial name
- Milkweed yellows phytoplasma

= Milkweed yellows phytoplasma =

Strain of bacterium

Milkweed yellows phytoplasma is a strain of phytoplasma in the class Mollicutes, a class of bacteria distinguished by the absence of a cell wall. The phytoplasma strain is denoted by the acronym MW1.

Like all phytoplasmas, milkweed yellows phytoplasma is an obligate intracellular parasite, that is, it can not live outside of host cells. It spreads by means of an insect vector, the identity of which is unknown. In general, phytoplasmas spread via leafhoppers and other sap-sucking insects that transmit the pathogen from one host plant to another.

== Taxonomy ==
In 1994, two strains of phytoplasmas that infect the common milkweed Asclepias syriaca (denoted MW1 and MW2) were shown to be members of the X-disease group (16Sr group III). Milkweed yellows phytoplasma (MW1) was later found to be a 'Candidatus Phytoplasma pruni'-related strain of phytoplasma belonging to subgroup F (16SrIII-F). Other phytoplasmas in subgroup 16SrIII-F include Vaccinium witches' broom phytoplasma (VAC, VacWB) and potato purple top phytoplasma (AKpot7). As of November 2021, milkweed yellows phytoplasma has not been formally described.

== Milkweed yellows ==
milkweed yellows
- Common names: none
- Causal agents: 'Candidatus Phytoplasma pruni'-related strain MW1, subgroup 16SrIII-F
- Hosts: Asclepias syriaca, Catharanthus roseus
- Vectors: unknown
- EPPO Code: PHYP20
- Distribution: Europe, United States
- Treatment: unknown

Milkweed yellows is an infectious disease of milkweeds caused by the milkweed yellows phytoplasma. Other diseases caused by pathogens in subgroup 16SrIII-F include Vaccinium witches' broom, potato purple top, and a greening disorder of Trillium grandiflorum and other Trillium species.

=== Hosts ===
The common milkweed Asclepias syriaca and the periwinkle Catharanthus roseus are known plant hosts for milkweed yellows phytoplasma. The insect host species for milkweed yellows is not known.

== See also ==
- Aster yellows
- Elm yellows
- Grapevine yellows

== Bibliography ==
- Griffiths, H. M.; Gundersen, D. E.; Sinclair, W. A.; Lee, I.-M.; Davis, R. E. (1994). "Mycoplasmalike organisms from milkweed, goldenrod, and spirea represent two new 16S rRNA subgroups and three new strain subclusters related to peach X-disease MLOs". Can. J. Plant Pathol. 16 (4): 255–260. Bibcode:1994CaJPP..16..255G. doi:10.1080/07060669409500728.
