= Phytoplasma pruni =

Candidatus Phytoplasma pruni

Scientific classification (Candidatus)
- Domain: Bacteria
- Kingdom: Bacillati
- Phylum: Mycoplasmatota
- Class: Mollicutes
- Order: Acholeplasmatales
- Family: Acholeplasmataceae
- Genus: Candidatus Phytoplasma
- Species: Ca. P. pruni

Binomial name
- Candidatus Phytoplasma pruni Davis et al. 2013

Synonyms
- Peach western X phytoplasma; Peach X disease phytoplasma; Peach yellow leafroll phytoplasma; Western X disease phytoplasma

Species of bacterium

Candidatus Phytoplasma pruni is a species of phytoplasma in the class Mollicutes, a class of bacteria distinguished by the absence of a cell wall. The specific epithet pruni means "living on Prunus", emphasizing the fact that the phytoplasma is a parasite of various Prunus species, otherwise known as stone fruits. The phytoplasma is commonly called the X-disease phytoplasma.

Like all phytoplasmas, Candidatus Phytoplasma pruni infects both plants and insects. Potential plant hosts include peach, cherry, plum, and others. Known insect hosts include various species of leafhoppers. Since the pathogen can not live outside of host cells, it must be transmitted to a new plant host by an infected leafhopper.

== Taxonomy ==
The name 'Candidatus Phytoplasma pruni' was informally suggested by the International Research Program for Comparative Mycoplasmology in 2004, but the taxon was not formally described until 2013. It belongs to the X-disease group (16Sr group III), subgroup A (16SrIII-A), the most studied subgroup of 16SrIII. This subgroup of phytoplasma is associated with a number of diseases:

'Candidatus Phytoplasma pruni'
Strain(s)	Associated disease	16Sr group-subgroup
PX11CT1^{R}, PX11CT2, PX92CT1, PX92CT2, PX92CT3, PX92CT4, CX-95, WX95	Peach X-disease	16SrIII-A
PR	Peach rosette	16SrIII-A
LP	Little peach	16SrIII-A
PRS	Peach red suture	16SrIII-A

PX11CT1^{R} is the reference strain for 'Candidatus Phytoplasma pruni'.

=== Related strains ===
Certain strains of phytoplasmas related to 'Candidatus Phytoplasma pruni' are associated with diseases of various plant species, including blueberry, clover, goldenrod, milkweed, spirea, pecan, poinsettia, potato, and walnut. These strains are classified in other subgroups of group III as follows:

'Candidatus Phytoplasma pruni'-related strains
Strain	Associated disease	16Sr group-subgroup
CYE (CYE-C)	Clover yellow edge	16SrIII-B
PBT (PB)	Pecan bunchy top	16SrIII-C
GR1	Goldenrod yellows	16SrIII-D
SP1	Spirea stunt	16SrIII-E
MW1	Milkweed yellows	16SrIII-F
VAC (VacWB)	Vaccinium witches' broom	16SrIII-F
AKpot7	Potato purple top	16SrIII-F
WWB	Walnut witches' broom	16SrIII-G
PoiBI	Poinsettia branch inducing	16SrIII-H
VGYIII	Virginia grapevine yellows	16SrIII-I

'Candidatus Phytoplasma pruni'-related strains
Strain	Associated disease	16Sr group-subgroup
ChWBIII	Chayote witches' broom	16SrIII-J
SLF	Strawberry leafy fruit	16SrIII-K
CFSD	Cassava frog skin disease	16SrIII-L
MT117	Potato purple top	16SrIII-M
AKpot6	Potato purple top	16SrIII-N
DanV	Dandelion virescence	16SrIII-P
BRWB7	Black raspberry witches' broom	16SrIII-Q
ChD	Sweet and sour cherry	16SrIII-T
CWL	Cirsium white leaf	16SrIII-U
PassWB-Br4	Passion fruit witches' broom	16SrIII-V
CB1Bc2	Cranberry false-blossom disease	16SrIII-Y

A 'Candidatus Phytoplasma pruni'-related strain in subgroup 16SrIII-F has also been implicated as the cause of a greening disorder of Trillium grandiflorum and other Trillium species.

== X-disease ==
X-disease
- Causal agents: Candidatus Phytoplasma pruni
- Hosts: Various Prunus species
- Vectors: Various species of leafhoppers in family Cicadellidae
- EPPO Code: PHYPPN
- Distribution: North America (Canada, Costa Rica, United States) and South America (Argentina)

X-disease was first discovered in California in 1931, where it was described as cherry buckskin. In 1933, the disease was found on peach in Connecticut, where it was called "X disease of peach" due to its unknown cause and mysterious nature. For many years, X-disease of peach was believed to be caused by a virus that was carried by insect vectors from nearby forests to peach orchards. In 1971, X-disease was found to be associated with mycoplasma-like organisms (now called phytoplasmas).

X-disease is an infectious disease of stone fruits (Prunus spp.). The disease is caused by Candidatus Phytoplasma pruni, a strain of phytoplasma belonging to 16Sr group III, the X-disease group of phytoplasmas.

=== Hosts ===
Historically, X-disease has been a major limiting factor in peach production in the United States. In addition to peach (Prunus persica), other species of the genus Prunus are susceptible to infection by the X-disease pathogen, including Prunus americana (wild American plum), Prunus armeniaca (apricot), Prunus avium (cherry), Prunus besseyi (Bessey cherry), Prunus cerasus (cherry), Prunus domestica (European plum), Prunus dulcis (almond), Prunus japonica (Chinese bush-cherry), Prunus munsoniana (wildgoose plum), Prunus persica var. nectarina (nectarine), Prunus salicina (Japanese plum), and Prunus virginiana (wild chokecherry).

=== Vectors ===
X-disease is transmitted by various species of leafhoppers in family Cicadellidae, including Colladonas clitellarius, C. montanus, C. geminatus, Euscelidius variegatus, Fieberiella florii, Graphocephala confluens, Gyponana lamina, Keonella confluens, Norvellina seminuda, Osbornellus borealis, Paraphlepsius irroratus, and Scaphytopius delongi.

=== Distribution ===
X-disease is present in North America (Canada, Costa Rica, United States) and South America (Argentina). It is localized in Canada (British Columbia, New Brunswick, Ontario) and widespread in the United States (California, Colorado, Connecticut, Massachusetts, Michigan, Missouri, Nebraska, New York, North Dakota, Oregon, Pennsylvania, Utah, Virginia, Washington). The disease may also be present in Asia (India, Japan), Europe (Poland), and additional U.S. states.

== See also ==
- Cherry X-disease
- Milkweed yellows phytoplasma
