= Phytoplasma palmicola =

Candidatus Phytoplasma palmicola

Scientific classification (Candidatus)
- Domain: Bacteria
- Kingdom: Bacillati
- Phylum: Mycoplasmatota
- Class: Mollicutes
- Order: Acholeplasmatales
- Family: Acholeplasmataceae
- Genus: Candidatus Phytoplasma
- Species: Ca. P. palmicola

Binomial name
- Candidatus Phytoplasma palmicola

Species of bacterium

Candidatus Phytoplasma palmicola is a phytoplasma first detected in Mozambique in 2007. A symptomology similar to coconut lethal yellowing disease (LYD) was found. This same disease was then found in Ivory Coast. It was discovered by Harrison et al., 2014 to be due to a species nova which they named Candidatus Phytoplasma palmicola and assigned to novel Candidatus Phytoplasma subgroup 16SrXXII-B.

== Distribution ==
Geographic range includes Mozambique and Ivory Coast.

== Hosts ==
Hosts include Cocos nucifera.
