= Acholeplasma laidlawii =

Scientific classification
- Domain: Bacteria
- Kingdom: Bacillati
- Phylum: Mycoplasmatota
- Class: Mollicutes
- Order: Acholeplasmatales
- Family: Acholeplasmataceae
- Genus: Acholeplasma
- Species: A. laidlawii

Binomial name
- Acholeplasma laidlawii (Sabin 1941) Edward and Freundt 1970

Species of bacterium

Acholeplasma laidlawii are small bacteria which lack a cell wall. Like other Acholeplasma and Mycoplasma, A. laidlawii has been identified as a common contaminant of growth media for cell culture.

== History ==
A. laidlawii was first isolated from sewage in London in 1936 and was named after its discoverer, Patrick Laidlaw.

== Genetics ==
A. laidlawii has a relatively small genome comprising 1.5Mbp. Additionally its genome has a low GC-content of just 31%. The A. laidlawii genome has been sequenced.

== In Research ==
Acholeplasma laidlawii may contaminate bovine serum and also occurs in serum-free cell culture media products. The presence of A. laidlawii in broth powders is a serious problem in routine biopharmaceutical operations where filtration is used as a sterilisation procedure. A. laidlawii may flourish and survive for prolonged periods at refrigeration and ambient temperatures in serum-free cell culture media.
