= Diphosphate-purine nucleoside kinase =

Class of enzymes

diphosphate-purine nucleoside kinase

Identifiers
- EC no.: 2.7.1.143
- CAS no.: 70356-41-1

Databases
- IntEnz: IntEnz view
- BRENDA: BRENDA entry
- ExPASy: NiceZyme view
- KEGG: KEGG entry
- MetaCyc: metabolic pathway
- PRIAM: profile
- PDB structures: RCSB PDB PDBe PDBsum
- Gene Ontology: AmiGO / QuickGO
Search
- PMC: articles
- PubMed: articles
- NCBI: proteins

Diphosphate-purine nucleoside kinase (EC 2.7.1.143) is an enzyme that catalyzes the general chemical reaction

diphosphate + a purine nucleoside $\rightleftharpoons$ phosphate + a purine mononucleotide

For example, it can convert guanosine to guanosine monophosphate:

diphosphate +
guanosine
phosphate +
guanosine monophosphate

The enzyme was characterised from the Acholeplasma class of Mollicutes.

This enzyme is a transferase, specifically one transferring phosphorus-containing groups (phosphotransferases) with an alcohol group as acceptor. The systematic name of this enzyme class is diphosphate:purine nucleoside phosphotransferase. This enzyme is also called pyrophosphate-purine nucleoside kinase.
