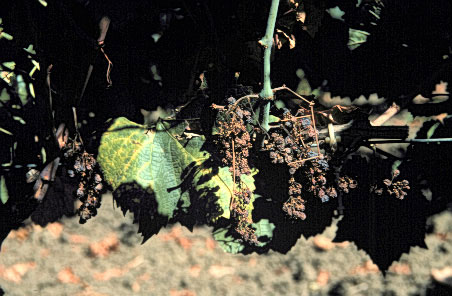
- Candidatus Phytoplasma solani on grape

Scientific classification (Candidatus)
- Domain: Bacteria
- Kingdom: Bacillati
- Phylum: Mycoplasmatota
- Class: Mollicutes
- Order: Acholeplasmatales
- Family: Acholeplasmataceae
- Genus: Candidatus Phytoplasma
- Species: Ca. P. solani

Binomial name
- Candidatus Phytoplasma solani Quaglino et al. 2013

= Phytoplasma solani =

Candidatus Phytoplasma solani

Species of bacterium

"Candidatus Phytoplasma solani"
- Common names: Black wood of grapevine; Bois noir; Maize redness; Metabolbur; Parastolbur; Stolbur of potato; Stolbur of tobacco; Stolbur of tomato; Tree peony yellows disease
- Causal agents: "Candidatus Phytoplasma solani"
- Hosts: Vine, maize, potato, tobacco, tomato, tree peony
- Vectors: Hyalesthes obsoletus
- EPPO Code: PHYPSO
- Distribution: France, China

"Candidatus Phytoplasma solani" is a phytopathogenic bacterial Phytoplasma species of the 16SrXII group, the causal agent of the black wood of grapevine. The black wood of grapevine disease is classified as part of the grapevine yellows.

"Ca. Phytoplasma solani" is also associated with the tree peony (Paeonia suffruticosa) yellows disease in China and tobacco (Nicotiana tabacum) leaf abnormality in Turkey.

== See also ==
- List of grape diseases
- List of tobacco diseases
- Flavescence dorée, another vine disease due to a Phytoplasma species
