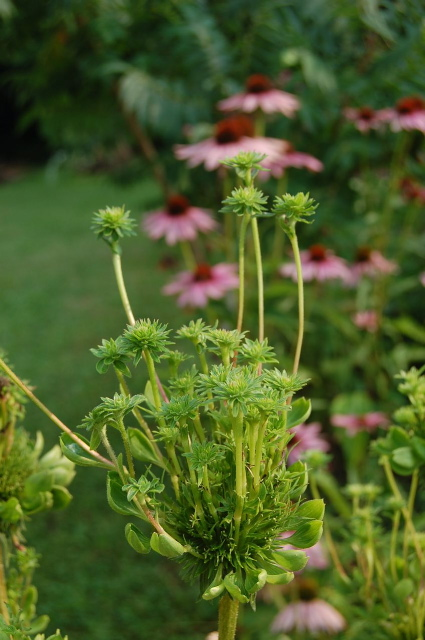
- Phyllody induced by phytoplasma infection on a coneflower (Echinacea purpurea)

Scientific classification (Candidatus)
- Domain: Bacteria
- Kingdom: Bacillati
- Phylum: Mycoplasmatota
- Class: Mollicutes
- Order: Acholeplasmatales
- Family: Acholeplasmataceae
- Genus: Candidatus Phytoplasma; Firrao et al. 2004

= Phytoplasma =

Genus of bacteria

Phytoplasmas are a group of Bacteria that are obligate intracellular parasites of plant phloem tissue and of the insect vectors that are involved in their plant-to-plant transmission. Phytoplasmas were discovered in 1967 by Japanese scientists who termed them mycoplasma-like organisms. Since their discovery, phytoplasmas have resisted all attempts at in vitro culture in any cell-free medium; routine cultivation in an artificial medium thus remains a major challenge. Phytoplasmas are characterized by the lack of a cell wall, a pleiomorphic or filamentous shape, a diameter normally less than 1 μm, and a very small genome.

Phytoplasmas are pathogens of agriculturally important plants, including coconut, sugarcane, sandalwood, and cannabis, as well as horticultural crops like sweet cherry, peaches, and nectarines. They cause a wide variety of symptoms ranging from mild yellowing, small fruit, and reduced sugar content to death. Phytoplasmas are most prevalent in tropical and subtropical regions. They are transmitted from plant to plant by vectors (normally sap-sucking insects such as leafhoppers) in which they both survive and replicate.

== History ==
References to diseases now known to be caused by phytoplasmas can be found as far back as 1603 (mulberry dwarf disease in Japan). Such diseases were originally thought to be caused by viruses, which, like phytoplasmas, require insect vectors and cannot be cultured. Viral and phytoplasmic infections share some symptoms. In 1967, phytoplasmas were discovered in ultrathin sections of plant phloem tissue and were termed mycoplasma-like organisms due to their physiological resemblance. The organisms were renamed phytoplasmas in 1994 at the 10th Congress of the International Organization for Mycoplasmology.

== Morphology ==
Phytoplasmas are Mollicutes that are bound by a triple-layered membrane rather than a cell wall. The phytoplasma cell membranes studied to date usually contain a single immunodominant protein of unknown function that constitutes most of the protein in the membrane. A typical phytoplasma is pleiomorphic or filamentous in shape and is less than 1 μm in diameter. Like other prokaryotes, phytoplasmic DNA is distributed throughout the cytoplasm instead of being concentrated in a nucleus.

== Symptoms ==
Phytoplasmas can infect and cause various symptoms in more than 700 plant species. One characteristic symptom is abnormal floral organ development, including phyllody (the production of leaf-like structures in place of flowers), virescence (the development of green flowers attributable to a loss of pigment by petal cells), and fasciation (abnormal change in the apical meristem structure). Phytoplasma-harboring flowering plants may become sterile. The expression of genes involved in maintaining the apical meristem or in the development of floral organs is altered in the morphologically affected floral organs of phytoplasma-infected plants.

A phytoplasma infection often triggers leaf yellowing, probably due to the presence of phytoplasma cells in the phloem, which can affect phloem function and carbohydrate transport, inhibit chlorophyll biosynthesis, and trigger chlorophyll breakdown. These symptoms may be attributable to stress caused by the infection rather than a specific pathogenetic process.

Many phytoplasma-infected plants develop a bushy or witch's broom appearance due to changes in their normal growth patterns. Most plants exhibit apical dominance, but infection can trigger the proliferation of axillary (side) shoots and a reduction in internode size. Such symptoms are actually useful in the commercial production of poinsettias. An infection triggers more axillary shoot production; the poinsettia plants thus produce more than a single flower.

== Effector (virulence) proteins ==
Many plant pathogens produce virulence factors, or effectors, that modulate or interfere with normal host processes to the benefit of the pathogens.

=== TENSU ===
The first phytoplasmal virulence factor, a secreted protein termed "tengu-su inducer" (TENGU; C0H5W6), was identified in 2009 from a phytoplasma causing yellowing of onions. TENGU induces characteristic symptoms, including witches' broom and dwarfism. Transgenic expression of TENGU in Arabidopsis plants induced sterility in male and female flowers.

TENGU contains a signal peptide at its N-terminus. After cleavage, the mature protein is only 38 amino acids long. Although phytoplasmas are restricted to the phloem, TENGU is transported from the phloem to other cells, including those of the apical and axillary meristems. TENGU was suggested to inhibit both auxin- and jasmonic acid-related pathways, thereby affecting plant development. Surprisingly, the N-terminal 11 amino acid region of the mature protein triggers symptom development in Nicotiana benthamiana plants. TENGU undergoes proteolytic processing by a plant serine protease in vivo, suggesting that the N-terminal peptide alone induces the observed symptoms. TENGU homologs have been identified in AY-group phytoplasmas. All such homologs undergo processing and can induce symptoms, suggesting that the symptom-inducing mechanism is conserved among TENGU homologs.

=== SAPs ===
In 2009, 56 genes for secreted proteins were identified in the genome of aster yellows witches' broom phytoplasma strain (AY-WB); these were named secreted AY-WB proteins (SAPs) and considered effectors.

==== SAP11 and family ====
Also in 2009, effector SAP11 was shown to target plant cell nuclei and unload from phloem cells in AY-WB-infected plants. SAP11 was later found to induce changes in leaf shapes of plants and stem proliferations which resembled the witches' broom symptoms of AY-WB-infected plants. In addition, it was demonstrated that SAP11 interacts with and destabilizes plant class II TCP protein domain transcription factors that lead to shoot proliferation and leaf shape changes.

TCPs also control the expression of lipoxygenase genes required for jasmonate biosynthesis. Jasmonate levels are decreased in phytoplasma-infected Arabidopsis plants and plants that transgenically express the AY-WB SAP11 effector. The downregulation of jasmonate production is beneficial to phytoplasmas because jasmonate is involved in plant defenses against herbivorous insects such as leafhoppers. Leafhoppers lay increased numbers of eggs on AY-WB-infected plants, at least in part because of SAP11 production. For example, the leafhopper Macrosteles quadrilineatus laid 30% more eggs on plants expressing SAP11 transgenically than control plants and 60% more eggs on plants infected with AY-WB. Phytoplasmas cannot survive in the external environment and are dependent upon insects such as leafhoppers for transmission to new (healthy) plants. Thus, by compromising jasmonate production, SAP11 encourages leafhoppers to lay more eggs on phytoplasma-infected plants, thereby ensuring that newly hatched leafhopper nymphs feed upon infected plants to become phytoplasma vectors.

SAP11-family effectors are identified in a number of divergent phytoplasmas and these effectors also interact with TCPs and modulate plant defenses. SAP11 is the first phytoplasma virulence protein for which plant targets and effector functions were identified. TCPs were found to be targeted by a number of other pathogen effectors.

==== SAP54 and the phyllogens ====
The AY-WB phytoplasma effector SAP54 was shown to induce virescence and phyllody when expressed in plants, and homologs of this effector were found in at least three other phytoplasmas. Two SAP54 homologs, PHYL1 of the onion yellows phytoplasma and PHYL1_{PnWB} of the peanut witches' broom phytoplasma, also induce phyllody-like floral abnormalities. These results suggest that PHYL1, SAP54, and their homologs form a phyllody-inducing gene family, the members of which are termed phyllogens.

MADS-box transcription factors (MTFs) of the ABCE model play critical roles in floral organ development in Arabidopsis. Phyllogens interact directly with class A and class E MTFs, inducing protein degradation in a ubiquitin/proteasome-dependent manner that, at least for SAP54, is dependent on interactions with the proteasome shuttle factor RAD23. Interestingly, RAD23 mutants do not show phyllody when infected with phytoplasma indicating that RAD23 proteins are susceptibility factors; i.e. phytoplasmas and SAP54 require these plant proteins to induce phyllody symptoms. The accumulation of mRNAs encoding class B MTFs, the transcription of which is positively regulated by class A and class E MTFs, is drastically decreased in Arabidopsis constitutively expressing PHYL1. Phyllogens induce abnormal floral organ development by inhibiting the functions of these MTFs. RAD23 proteins are also required for promoting leafhopper vector egg laying on plants that express SAP54 and are infected with AY-WB phytoplasma.

== Transmission ==
=== Movement between plants ===
Phytoplasmas are spread principally by insects of the families Cicadellidae (leafhoppers), Fulgoridae (planthoppers), and Psyllidae (jumping plant lice), which feed on the phloem of infected plants, ingesting phytoplasmas and transmitting them to the next plant on which they feed. Thus, the host range of phytoplasmas is strongly dependent upon that of the insect vector. Phytoplasmas contain a major antigenic protein constituting most of the cell surface protein. This protein associates with insect microfilament complexes and is believed to control insect-phytoplasma interactions. Phytoplasmas can overwinter in insect vectors or perennial plants. Phytoplasmas can have varying effects on their insect hosts; examples of both reduced and increased fitness have been noted.

Phytoplasmas enter the insect body through the stylet, pass through the intestine, and then move to the hemolymph and colonize the salivary glands. The entire process can take up to 3 weeks. Once established in an insect host, phytoplasmas are found in most major organs. The time between ingestion by the insect and attainment of an infectious titer in the salivary glands is termed the latency period.

Phytoplasmas can also be spread via dodders (Cuscuta) or by vegetative propagation such as the grafting of infected plant tissue onto a healthy plant.

=== Movement within plants ===
Phytoplasmas move within phloem from a source to a sink, and can pass through sieve tube element. However, as phytoplasmas spread more slowly than solutes, and for other reasons, passive translocation within plants is thought to be unimportant

== Detection and diagnosis ==
Before the molecular era, the diagnosis of diseases caused by phytoplasma was difficult because the organisms could not be cultured. Thus, classical diagnostic techniques, including symptom observation, were used. Ultrathin sections of phloem tissue from plants with suspected phytoplasma-infections were also studied. The empirical use of antibiotics such as tetracycline was additionally employed.

Molecular diagnostic techniques for phytoplasma detection began to emerge in the 1980s and included enzyme-linked immunosorbent assay (ELISA)-based methods. In the early 1990s, polymerase chain reaction (PCR)-based techniques were developed. These are far more sensitive than ELISAs, and restriction fragment length polymorphism (RFLP) analysis allowed the accurate identification of various phytoplasma strains and species.

More recent techniques allow infection levels to be assessed. Both quantitative PCR and bioimaging can effectively quantify phytoplasma titers within plants. In addition, loop-mediated isothermal amplification (LAMP) is now available as a commercial kit, allowing all known phytoplasma species to be detected in about 1 h, including the DNA extraction step.

Although phytoplasmas have recently been reported to be grown in a specific artificial medium, experimental repetition has yet to be reported.

== Control ==
Phytoplasmas are normally controlled by the breeding and planting of disease-resistant crop varieties and by the control of insect vectors.

Tissue culture can be used to produce healthy clones of phytoplasma-infected plants. Cryotherapy, the freezing of plant samples in liquid nitrogen, prior to tissue culture increases the probability of producing healthy plants in this manner.

Plantibodies targeting phytoplasmas have also been developed.

Tetracyclines are bacteriostatic to phytoplasmas. However, disease symptoms reappear in the absence of continuous antibiotic application. Thus, tetracycline is not a viable agricultural control agent, but it is used to protect ornamental coconut trees.

== Genetics ==
The genomes of four phytoplasmas have been sequenced: "onion yellows", "aster yellows witches' broom" ("Candidatus Phytoplasma asteris"), "Ca. Phytoplasma australiense", and "Ca. Phytoplasma mali". Phytoplasmas have very small genomes with extremely low GC content (sometimes as little as 23%, which is thought to be the lower threshold for a viable genome). In fact, the Bermuda grass white-leaf phytoplasma ("Ca. P. cynodontis") has a genome size of only 530 kilobases (kb), one of the smallest known genomes of all living organisms. The larger phytoplasma genomes are around 1350 kb in size. The small genome size of phytoplasma is attributable to reductive evolution from Bacillus/Clostridium ancestors. Phytoplasmas have lost ≥75% of their original genes, and can thus no longer survive outside of insects or plant phloem. Some phytoplasmas contain extrachromosomal DNA such as plasmids.

Despite their small genomes, many predicted phytoplasma genes are present in multiple copies. Phytoplasmas lack many genes encoding standard metabolic functions and have no functioning homologous recombination pathway, but they do have a sec transport pathway. Many phytoplasmas contain two rRNA operons. Unlike other Mollicutes, the triplet code of UGA is used as a stop codon in phytoplasmas.

Phytoplasma genomes contain large numbers of transposons and insertion sequences, as well as a unique family of repetitive extragenic palindromes termed PhREPS, for which no role is known. It is theorized that the stem-loop structures in PhREPS play a role in transcription termination or genome stability.

== Taxonomy ==
Phytoplasmas belong to the monotypic order Acholeplasmatales. In 1992, the Subcommittee on the Taxonomy of Mollicutes proposed the use of "'Phytoplasma' rather than 'mycoplasma-like organisms' for reference to the phytopathogenic mollicutes". In 2004, the generic name Phytoplasma was adopted and is currently of Candidatus (Ca.) status (used for bacteria that cannot be cultured). As phytoplasma cannot be cultured, methods normally used to classify prokaryotes are not available. Phytoplasma taxonomic groups are based on differences in fragment sizes produced by restriction digests of 16S ribosomal RNA gene sequences (RFLPs) or by comparisons of DNA sequences from 16S/23S spacer regions. The actual number of taxonomic groups remains unclear; recent work on computer-simulated restriction digests of the 16Sr gene suggested up to 28 groups, whereas others have proposed fewer groups with more subgroups. Each group includes at least one Ca. Phytoplasma species, characterized by distinctive biological, phytopathological, and genetic properties.

== Species ==
As of November 2021, the following names and type strains are from LPSN,, the List of Prokaryotic names with Standing in Nomenclature. The associated diseases and 16Sr group-subgroup classifications are from various sources.

Phylogeny of "Ca. Phytoplasma"

- - - - 16SrI
        - "Ca. P. asteris"
        - "Ca. P. tritici"
    - - 16SrXIII
        "Ca. P. meliae"
      - 16SrXII
        - "Ca. P. australiense"
        - "Ca. P. solani"
  - - "Ca. P. mali" {16SrX}
    - - "Ca. P. pruni" {16SrIII}
      - - - 16SrII
            - "Ca. P. australasiatica"
            - "Ca. P. citri"
        - - - 16SrIX
              "Ca. P. oryzae"
            - 16SrXI
              - "Ca. P. cynodontis"
              - "Ca. P. sacchari"
          - - "Ca. P. phoenicium" {16SrIX}
            - - "Ca. P. pini" {16SrXXI}
              - - 16SrVIII
                  "Ca. P. luffae"
                - 16SrV
                  - "Ca. P. vitis"
                  - "Ca. P. ziziphi"

"Candidatus Phytoplasma" species
Species name	Associated disease	Type strain	16Sr group-subgroup
"Ca. P. aculeata" Soto et al. 2021			4 / IV
"Ca. P. allocasuarinae" Marcone et al. 2004	Allocasuarina yellows	AlloY	33A / XXXIII-A
"Ca. P. americanum" Lee et al. 2006	American potato purple top wilt	APPTW12-NE; PPT12-NE	28A / XVIII-A
"Ca. P. asteris" Lee et al. 2004	Aster yellows	MIAY; OAY	1B / I-B
"Ca. P. australamericanum" corrig. Davis et al. 2012 (Ca. P. sudamericanum Davis et al. 2012)	Passionfruit witches' broom	PassWB-Br3; PassWB-Br3R	6I / VI-I
"Ca. P. australasiaticum" corrig. White et al. 1998 (Ca. P. australasia White et al. 1998)	Papaya mosaic	PpYC	2D / II-D
"Ca. P. australiense" Davis et al. 1997	Australian grapevine yellows	none	12B / XII-B
"Ca. P. balanitis" corrig. Win et al. 2013 (Ca. P. balanitae Win et al. 2013)	Balanites witches' broom	none	5F / V-F
"Ca. P. bonamiae" Rodrigues-Jardim et al. 2023		none	
"Ca. P. brasiliense" Montano et al. 2001	Hibiscus witches' broom	HibWB26	15A / XV-A
"Ca. P. caricae" Arocha et al. 2005	Papaya bunchy top	PAY	17A / XVII-A
"Ca. P. castaneae" Jung et al. 2002	Chestnut witches' broom	CnWB	19A / XIX-A
"Ca. P. cirsii" Šafárová et al. 2016	Cirsium yellows and stunting	CirYS	11E / XI-E
"Ca. P. citri" corrig. Zreik et al. 1995 (Ca. P. aurantifolia Zreik et al. 1995)	Lime witches' broom	WBDL	2B / II-B
"Ca. P. cocoinigeriae" corrig. Firrao et al. 2004			
"Ca. P. cocoitanzaniae" corrig. Firrao et al. 2004		4 / IV	
"Ca. P. convolvuli" Martini et al. 2012	Bindweed yellows	BY-S57/11	12H / XII-H
"Ca. P. costaricanum" Lee et al. 2011	Soybean stunt	SoyST1c1	31A / XXXI-A
"Ca. P. cynodontis" Marcone et al. 2004	Bermuda grass white leaf	BGWL-C1	14A / XIV-A
"Ca. P. dypsidis" Jones et al. 2021		RID7692	4 / IV-?
"Ca. P. fabacearum" Rodrigues-Jardim et al. 2023		none	
"Ca. P. fragariae" Valiunas et al. 2006	Strawberry yellows	StrawY; StrawYR	12E / XII-E
"Ca. P. fraxini" Griffiths et al. 1999	Ash yellows	AshY1; Ashy lT	12A / VII-A
"Ca. P. graminis" Arocha et al. 2005	Sugarcane yellow leaf	SCYLP	16A / XVI-A
"Ca. P. hispanicum" Davis et al. 2016	Mexican periwinkle virescence	MPV; MPVR	13A / XIII-A
"Ca. P. hispanola" Soto et al. 2021			4 / IV
"Ca. P. japonicum" Sawayanagi et al. 1999	Japanese hydrangea phyllody	none	12D / XII-D
"Ca. P. luffae" Davis et al. 2017	Loofah witches' broom	LfWB; LfWBR	8A / VIII-A
"Ca. P. lycopersici" Arocha et al. 2007	Tomato 'brote grande'	THP	1Y / I-Y
"Ca. P. malaysianum" Nejat et al. 2013	Malaysian periwinkle virescence	MaPV; MaPVR	32A / XXXII-A
"Ca. P. mali" Seemüller and Schneider 2004	Apple proliferation	AP15	10A / X-A
"Ca. P. meliae" Fernández et al. 2016	Chinaberry yellowing	ChTY-Mo3	13G / XIII-G
"Ca. P. noviguineense" Miyazaki et al. 2018	Bogia coconut syndrome	BCS-Bo; BCS-BoR	
"Ca. P. omanense" Al-Saady et al. 2008	Cassia witches' broom	IM-1	29A / XXIX-A
"Ca. P. oryzae" Jung et al. 2003	Rice yellow dwarf	RYD-Th	9A / XI-A
"Ca. P. palmae" Firrao et al. 2004	Palm lethal yellowing		4D / IV-D
"Ca. P. palmicola" Harrison et al. 2014	Coconut lethal yellowing	LYDM-178; LYDM-178R	12A / XXII-A
"Ca. P. persicae" Jones et al. 2004			12 / XII
"Ca. P. phoenicium" Verdin et al. 2003	Almond witches' broom	A4	9B / IX-B
"Ca. P. pini" Schneider et al. 2005	Pine witches' broom	Pin127S; Pin127SR	21A / XXI-A
"Ca. P. planchoniae" Rodrigues-Jardim et al. 2023		none	
"Ca. P. pruni" Davis et al. 2013	Peach X-disease	PX11Ct1; PX11CT1R	3A / III-A
"Ca. P. prunorum" Seemüller and Schneider 2004	European stone fruit yellows	ESFY-G1	10B / X-B
"Ca. P. pyri" Seemüller and Schneider 2004	Pear decline	PD1	10C / X-C
"Ca. P. rhamni" Marcone et al. 2004	Rhamnus witches' broom	BAWB; BWB	20A / XX-A
"Ca. P. rubi" Malembic-Maher et al. 2011	Rubus stunt	RuS	5E / V-E
"Ca. P. sacchari" Kirdat et al. 2021	Sugarcane Grassy Shoot Disease	SCGS	11B / XI-B
"Ca. P. solani" Quaglino et al. 2013	Stolbur	STOL; STOL11R	12A / XII-A
"Ca. P. spartii" Marcone et al. 2004	Spartium witches' broom	SpaWB	10D / X-D
"Ca. P. stylosanthis" Rodrigues-Jardim et al. 2021	Stylosanthes little leaf phytoplasma	VPRI 43683	33A / XXXVII-A
"Ca. P. tamaricis" Zhao et al. 2009	Salt cedar witches' broom	SCWB1; SCWB1R	30A / XXX-A
"Ca. P. taraxaca" corrig. Matiashova 2017			3 / III
"Ca. P. trifolii" Hiruki and Wang 2004	Clover proliferation	CP	6A / VI-A
"Ca. P. tritici" Zhao et al. 2021		WBD R	1C / I-C
"Ca. P. ulmi" Lee et al. 2004	Elm yellows	EY1	5A / V-A
"Ca. P. vitis" Firrao et al. 2004		none	5 / V-?
"Ca. P. wodyetiae" Naderali et al. 2017	Foxtail palm yellow decline	Bangi-2; FPYD Bangi-2R	36A / XXXVI-A
"Ca. P. ziziphi" Jung et al. 2003	Jujube witches' broom	JWB; JWB-Ky	5B / V-B

== Gallery ==
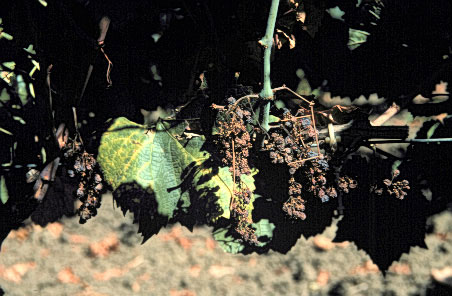
A grape vine with "Candidatus bois noir" phytoplasma disease

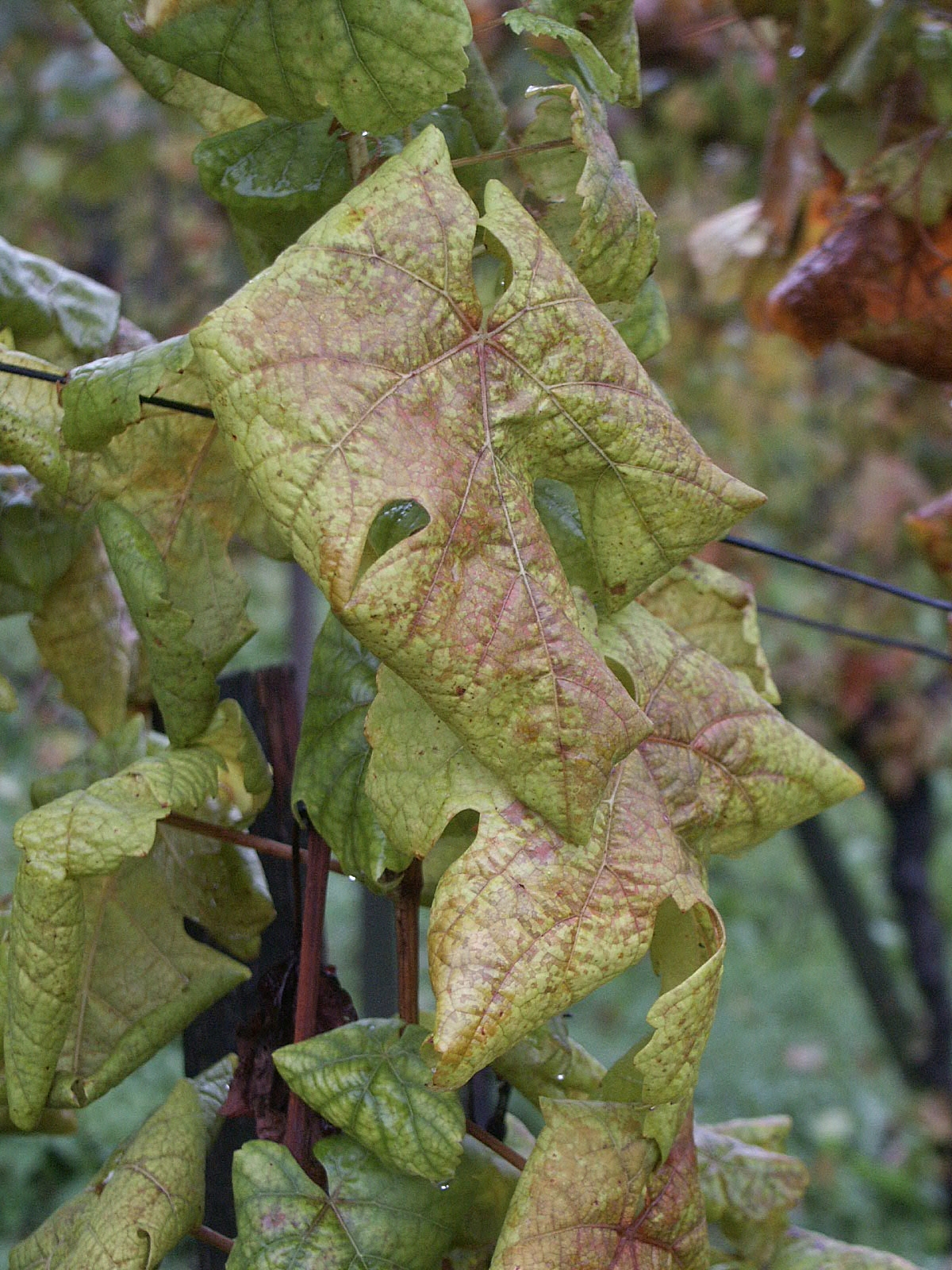
A grape vine with "flavescence dorée" phytoplasma disease

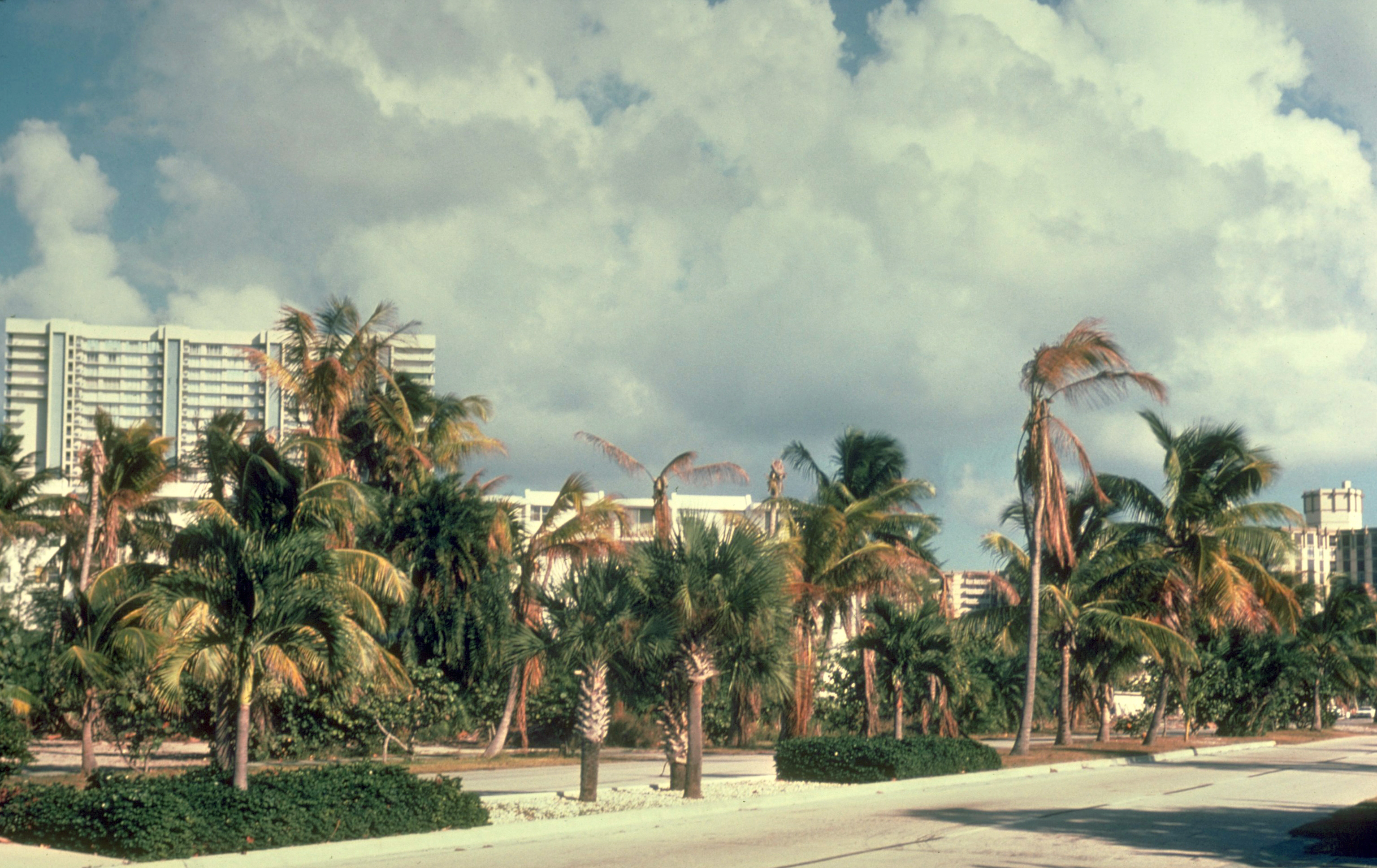
Coconut palms dying of lethal yellowing disease

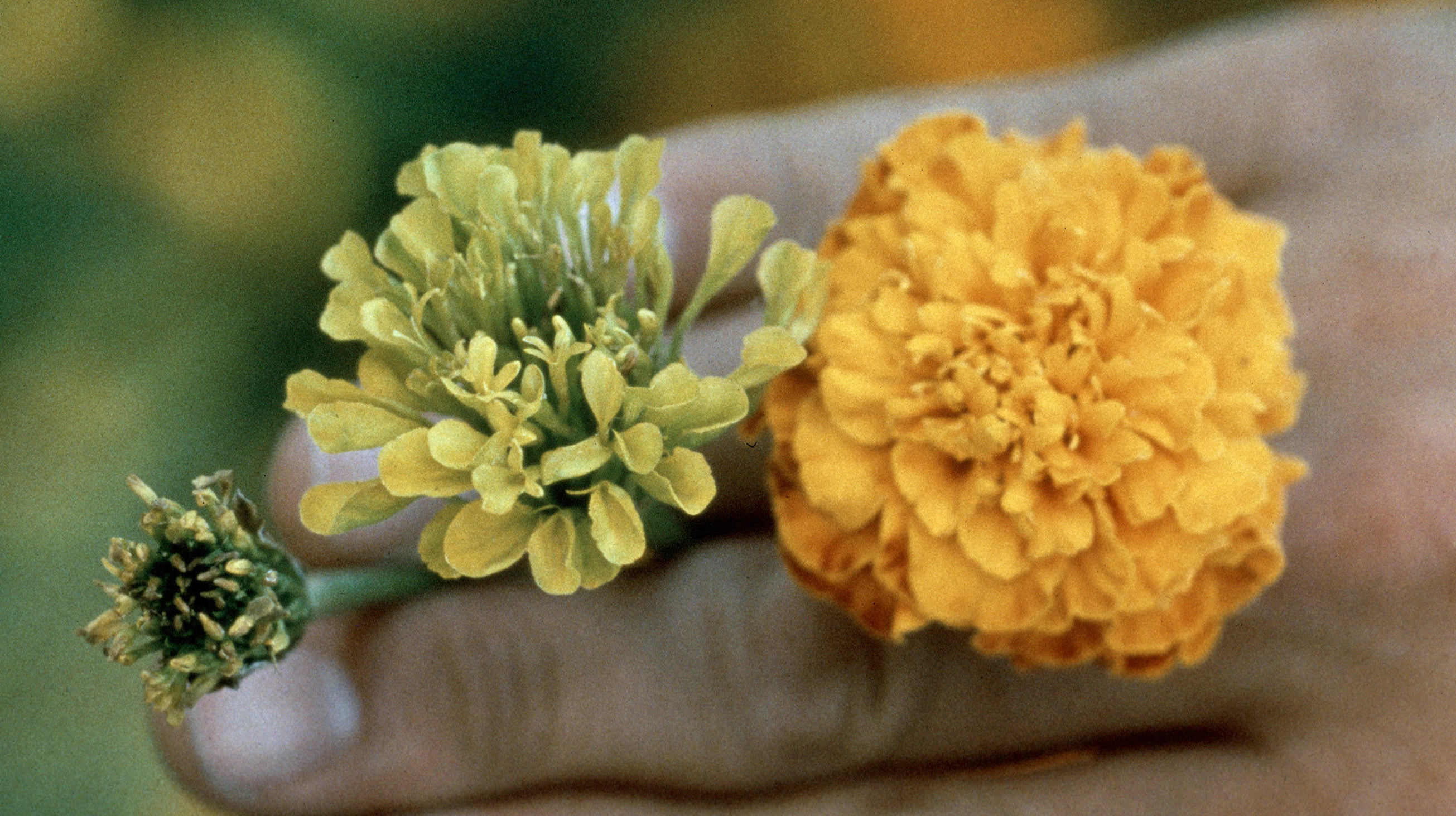
Symptoms of aster yellows on marigold

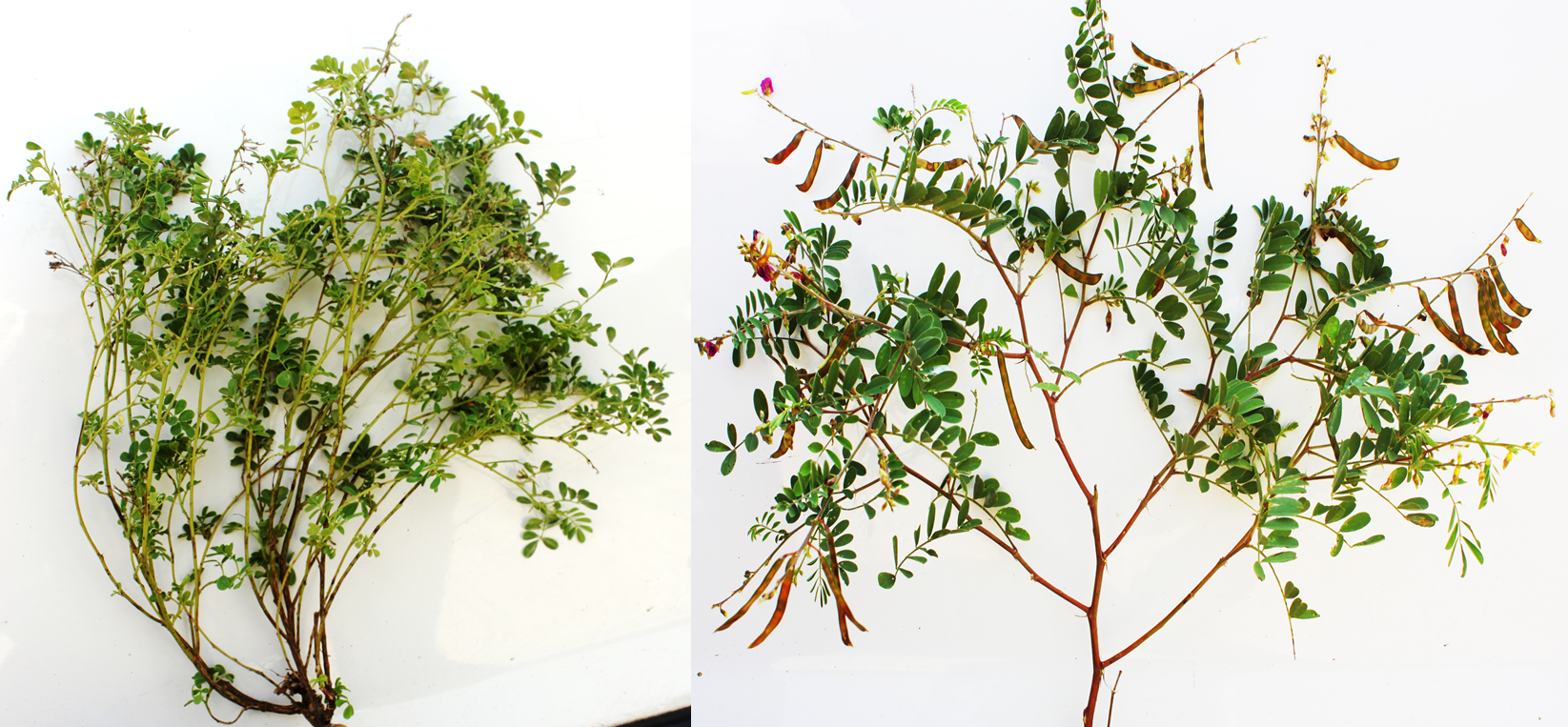
Tephrosia purpurea witches' broom

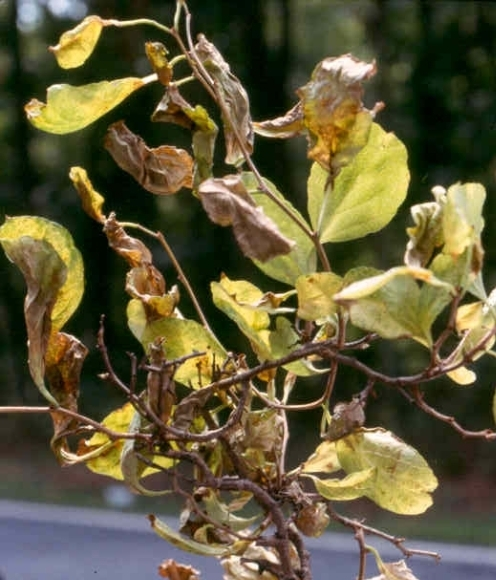
Symptoms of elm phloem necrosis phytoplasma

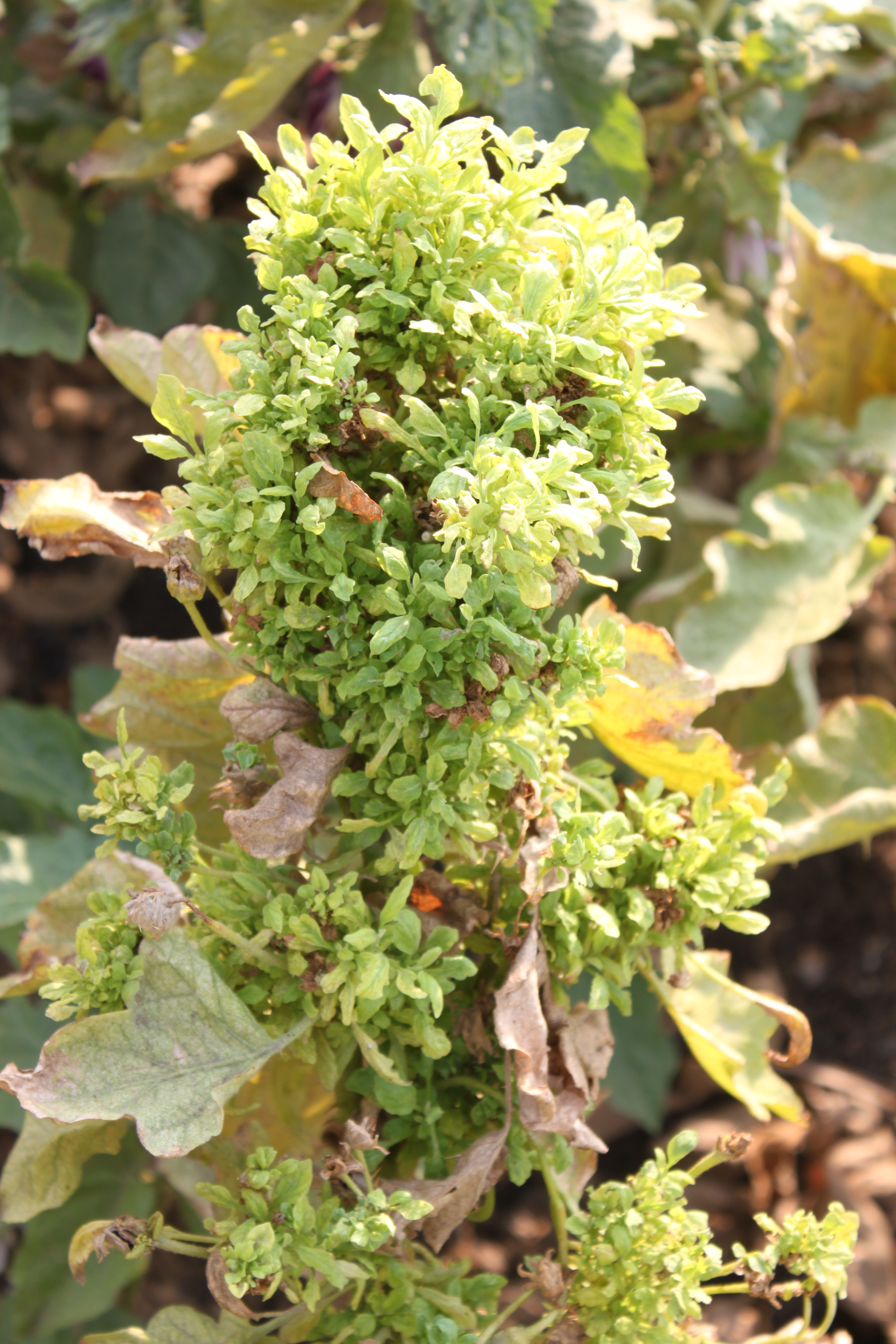
Brinjal Little leaf phytoplasma

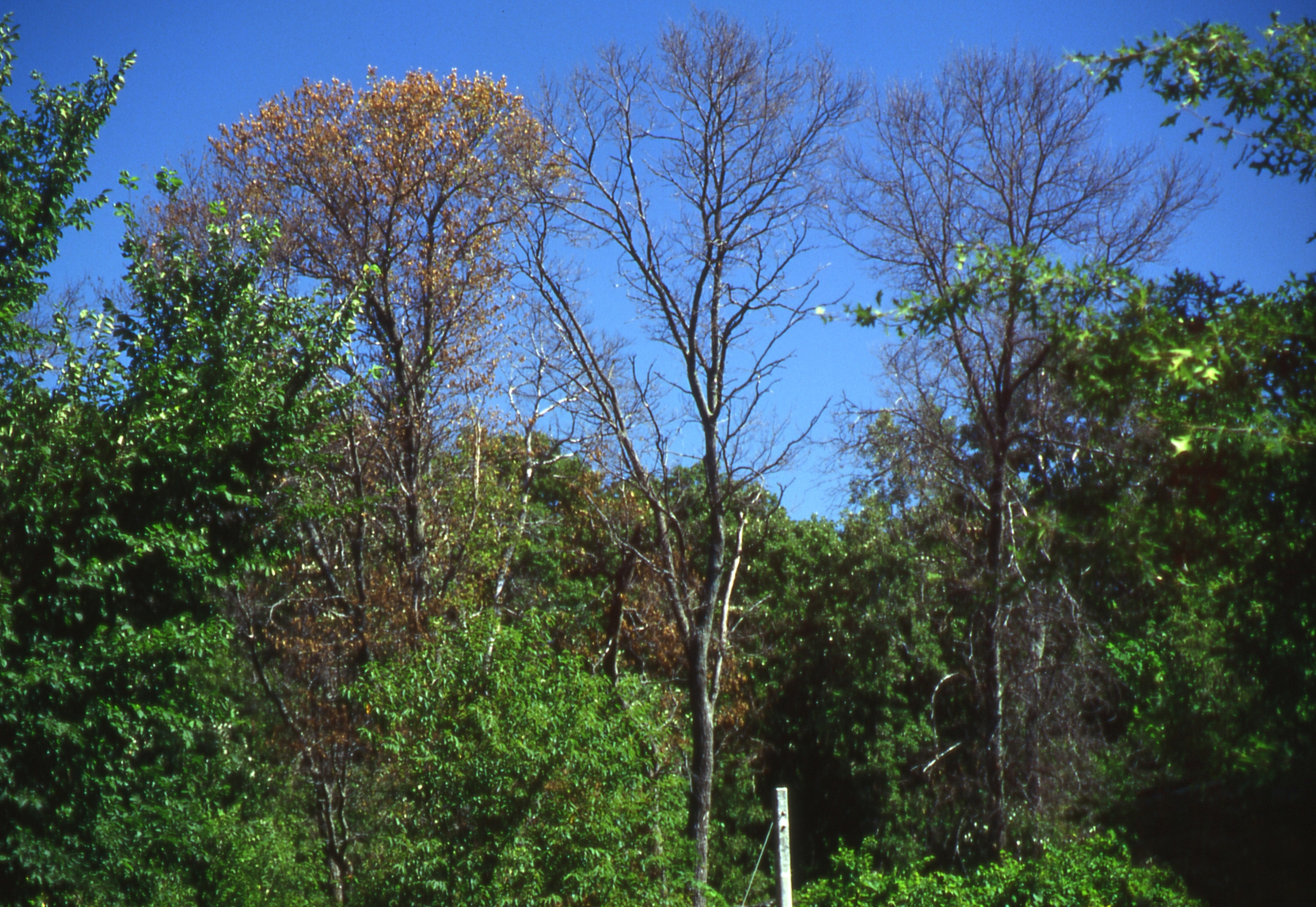
Trees dying of ash yellows phytoplasma

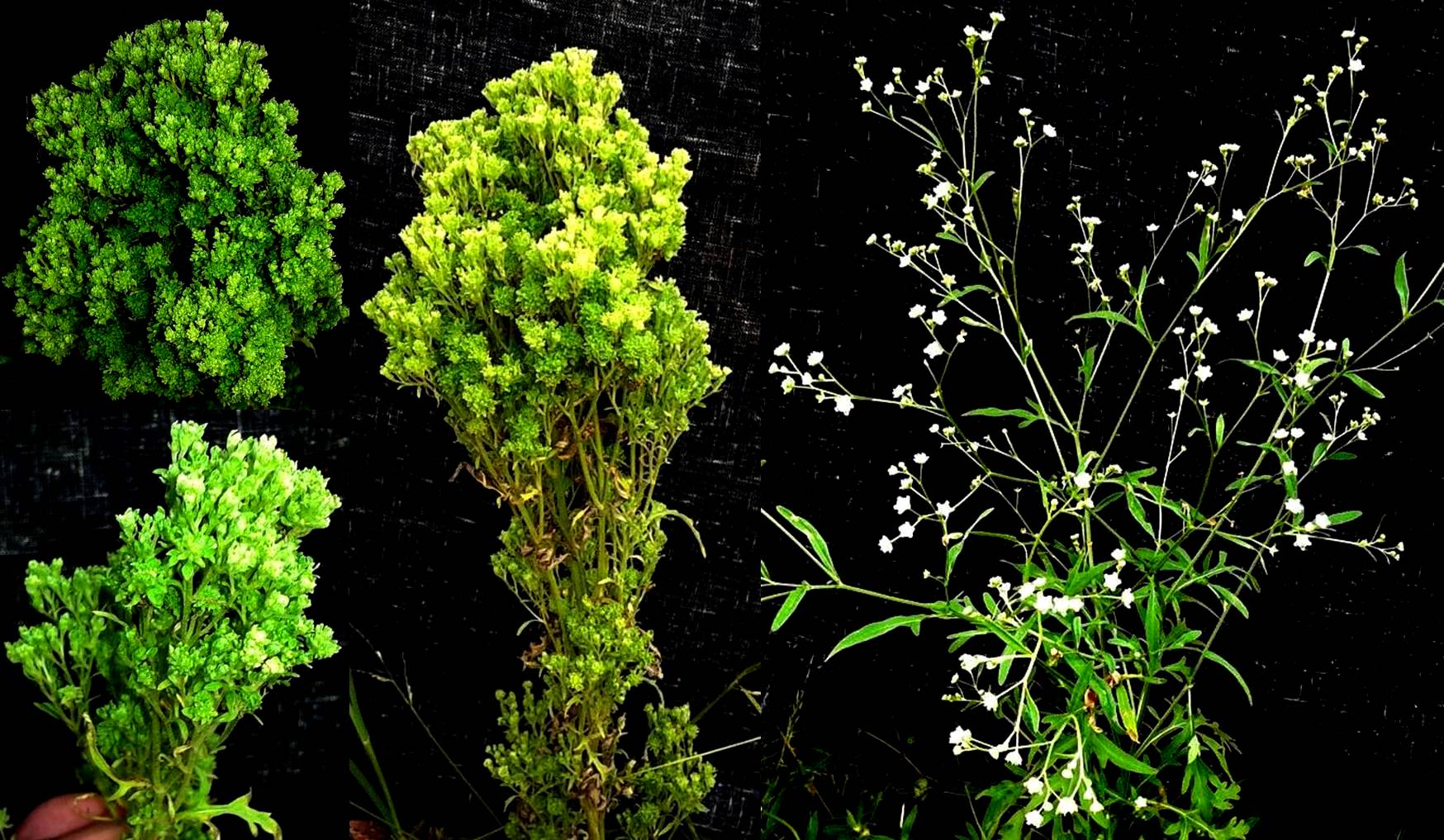
Parthenium hysterophorus showing symptoms of witches' broom

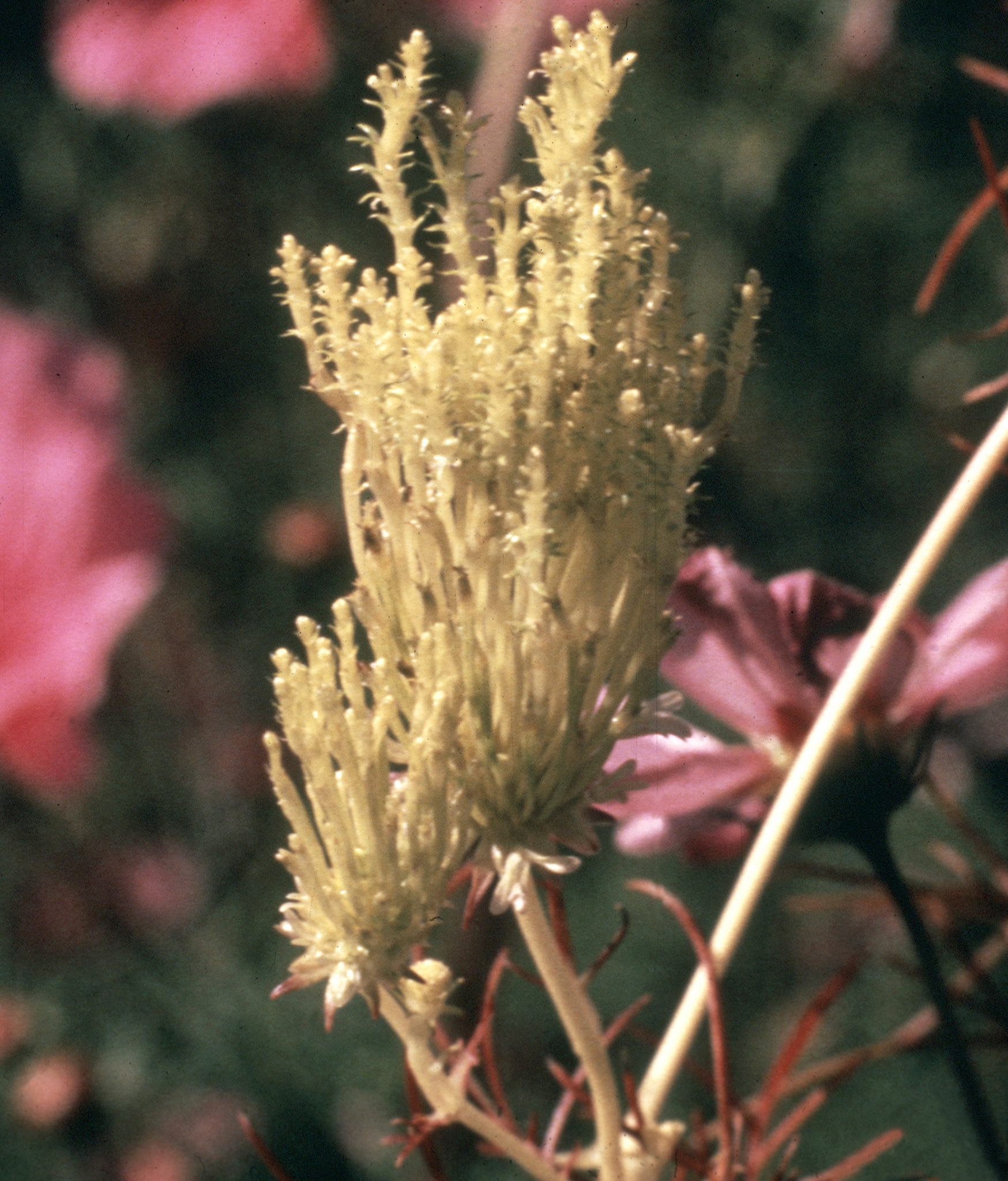
Phyllody caused by phytoplasma infection on Cosmos spp.

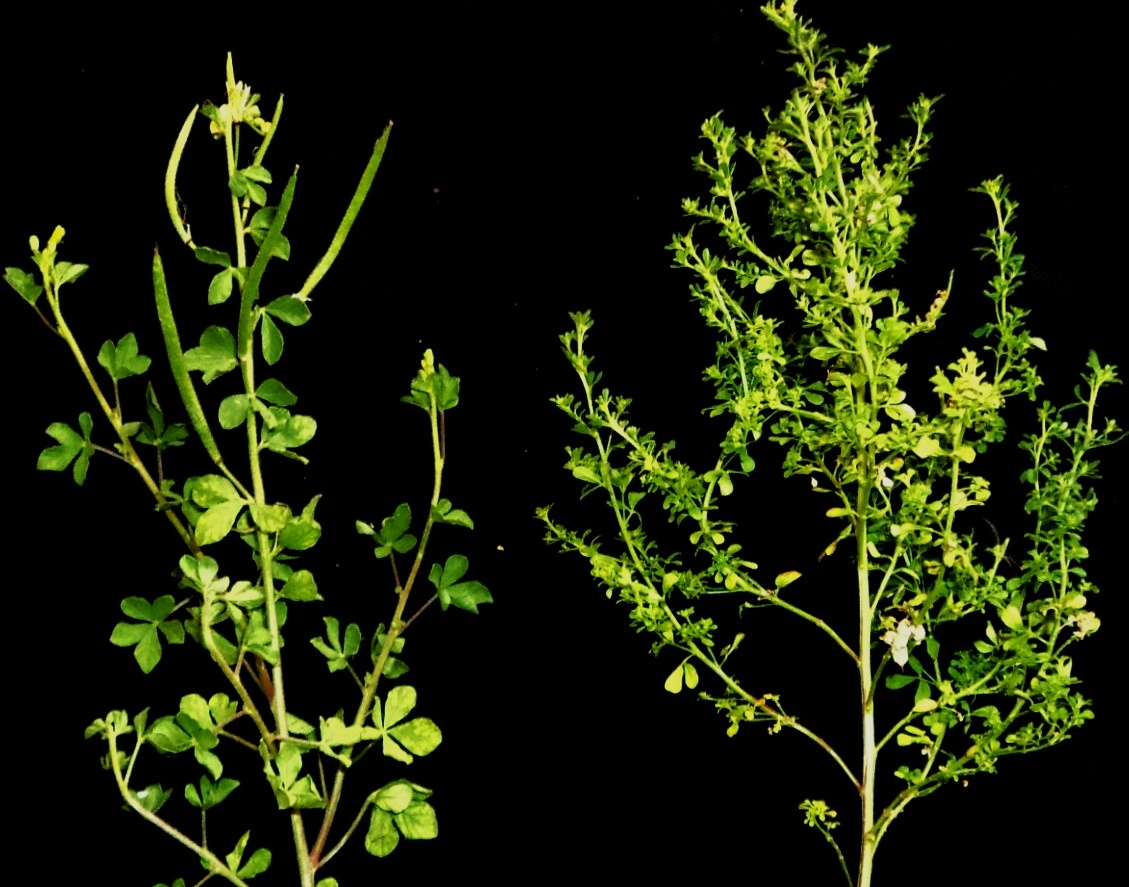
Little leaf disease of Cleome viscosa

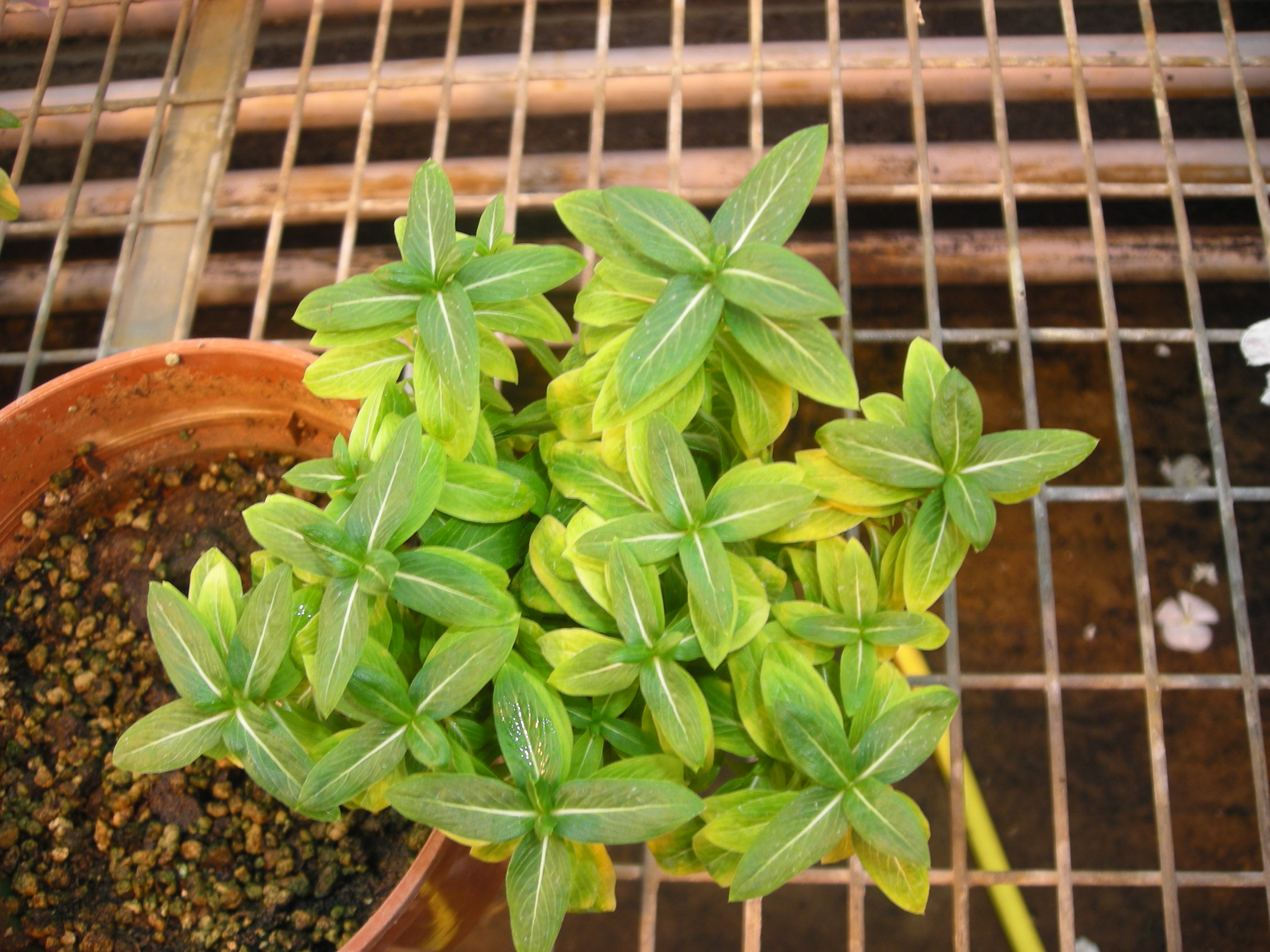
Symptoms of sweet potato little leaf phytoplasma on Catharanthus roseus

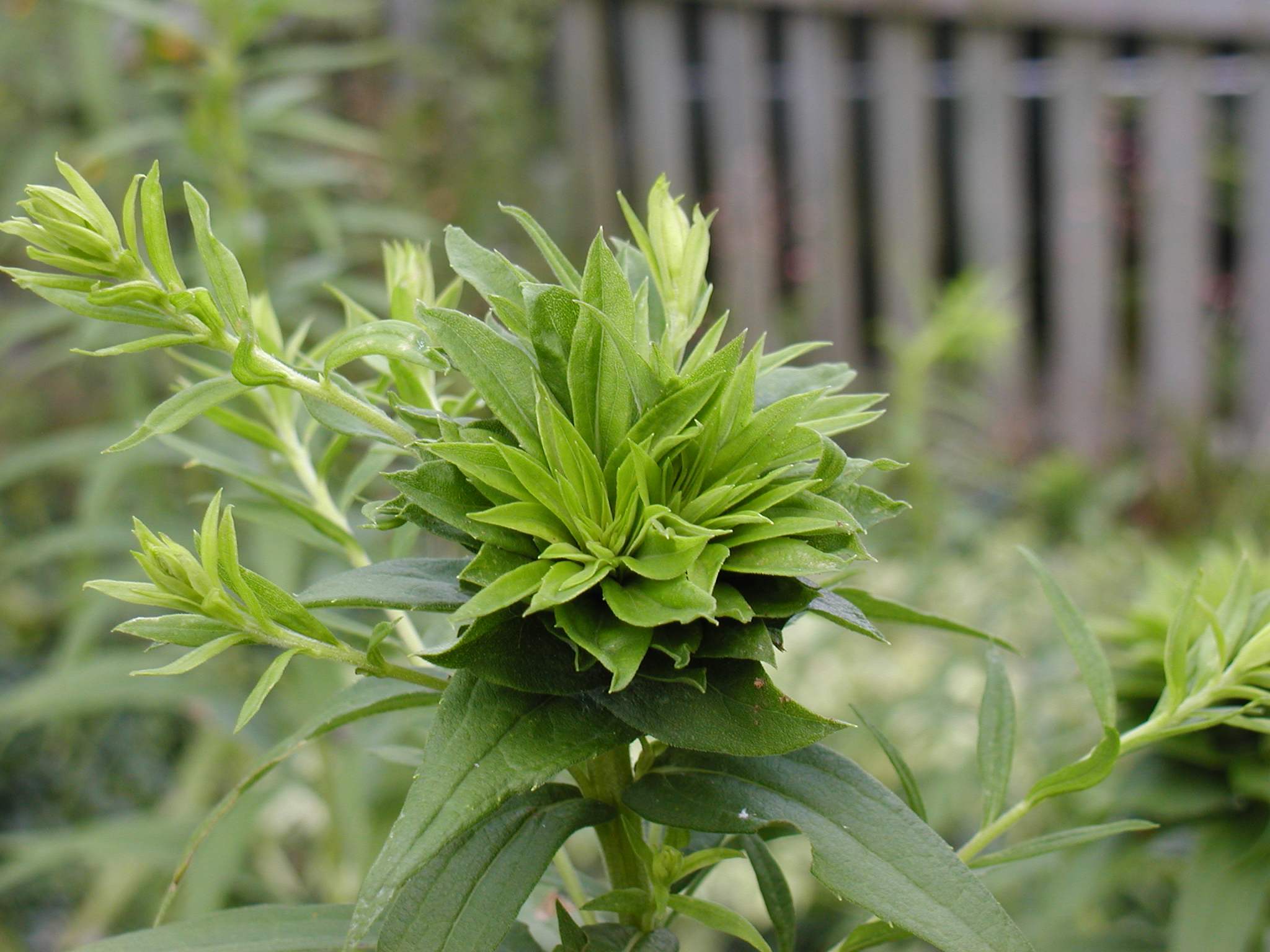
Phyllody of goldenrod

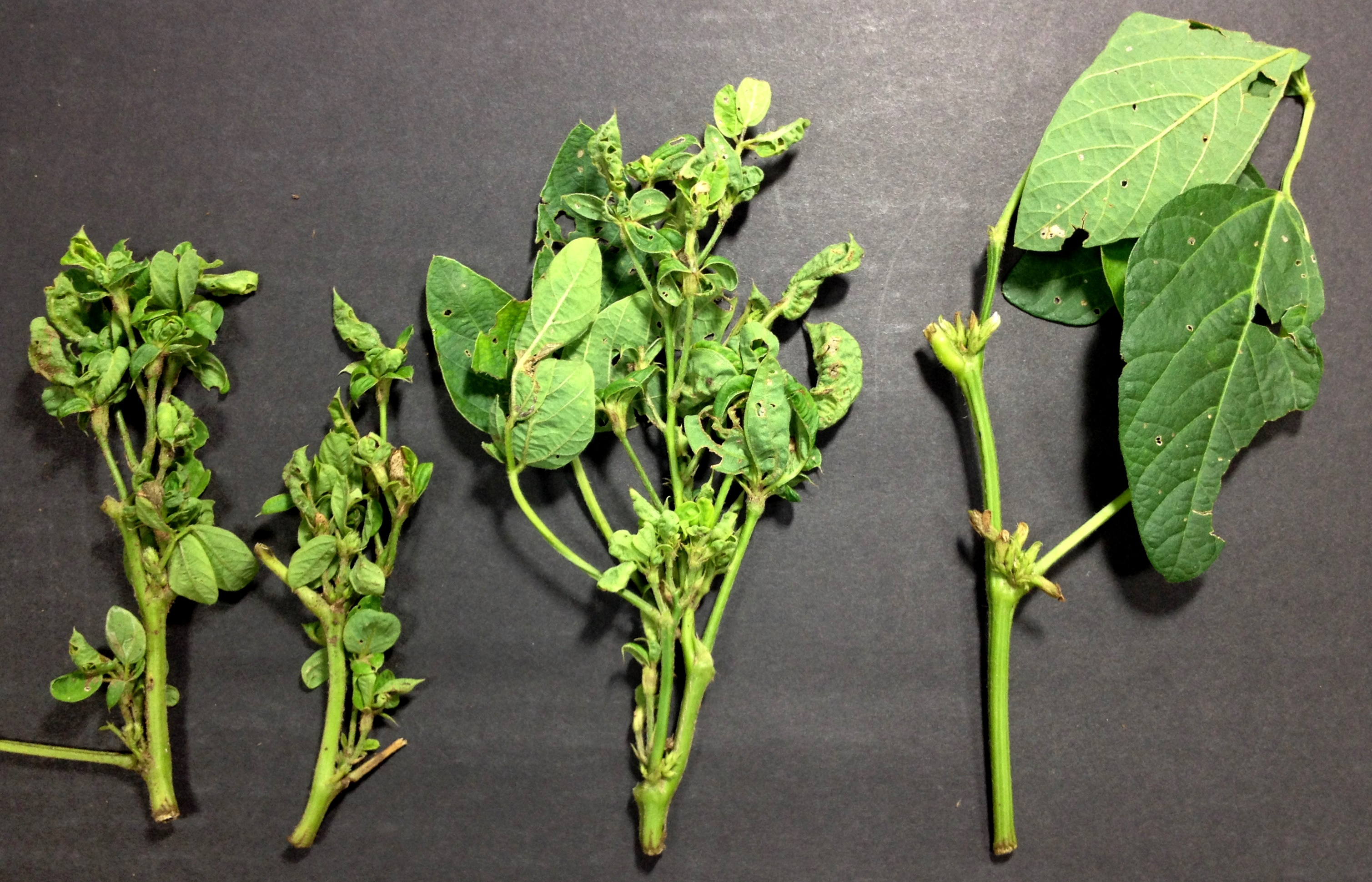
Soybean Phytoplasma

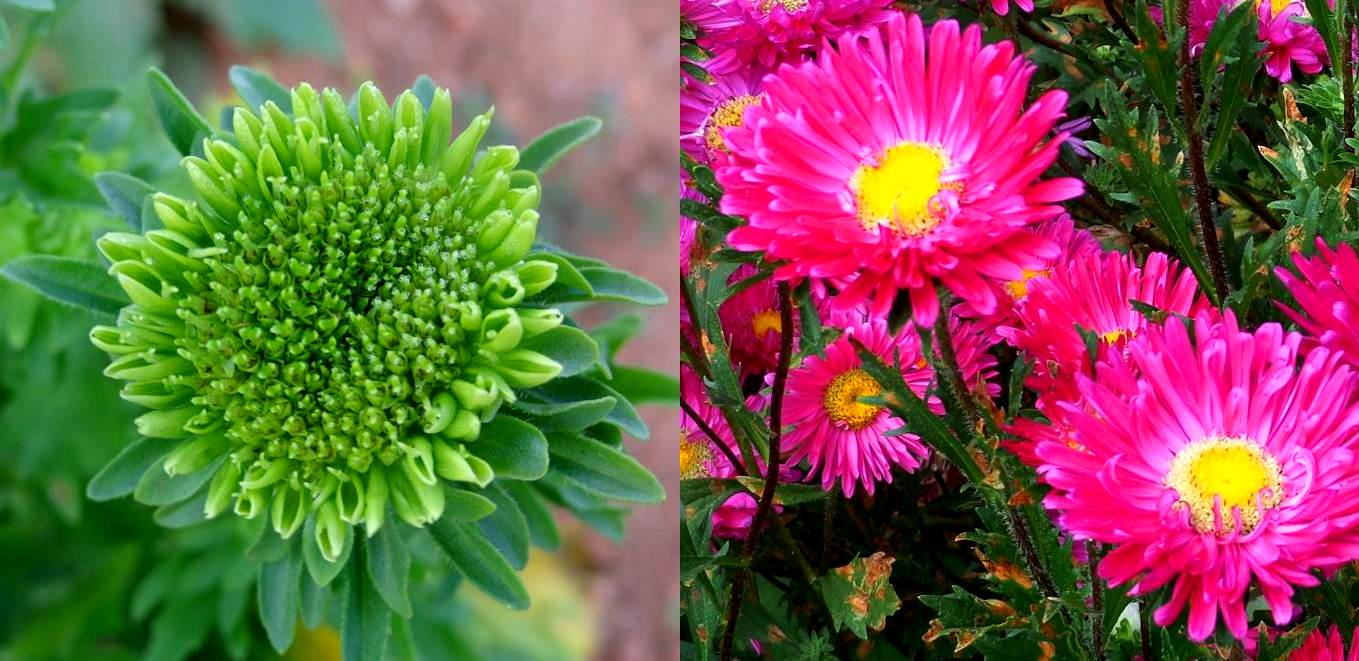
A flower of China Aster showing phyllody symptoms

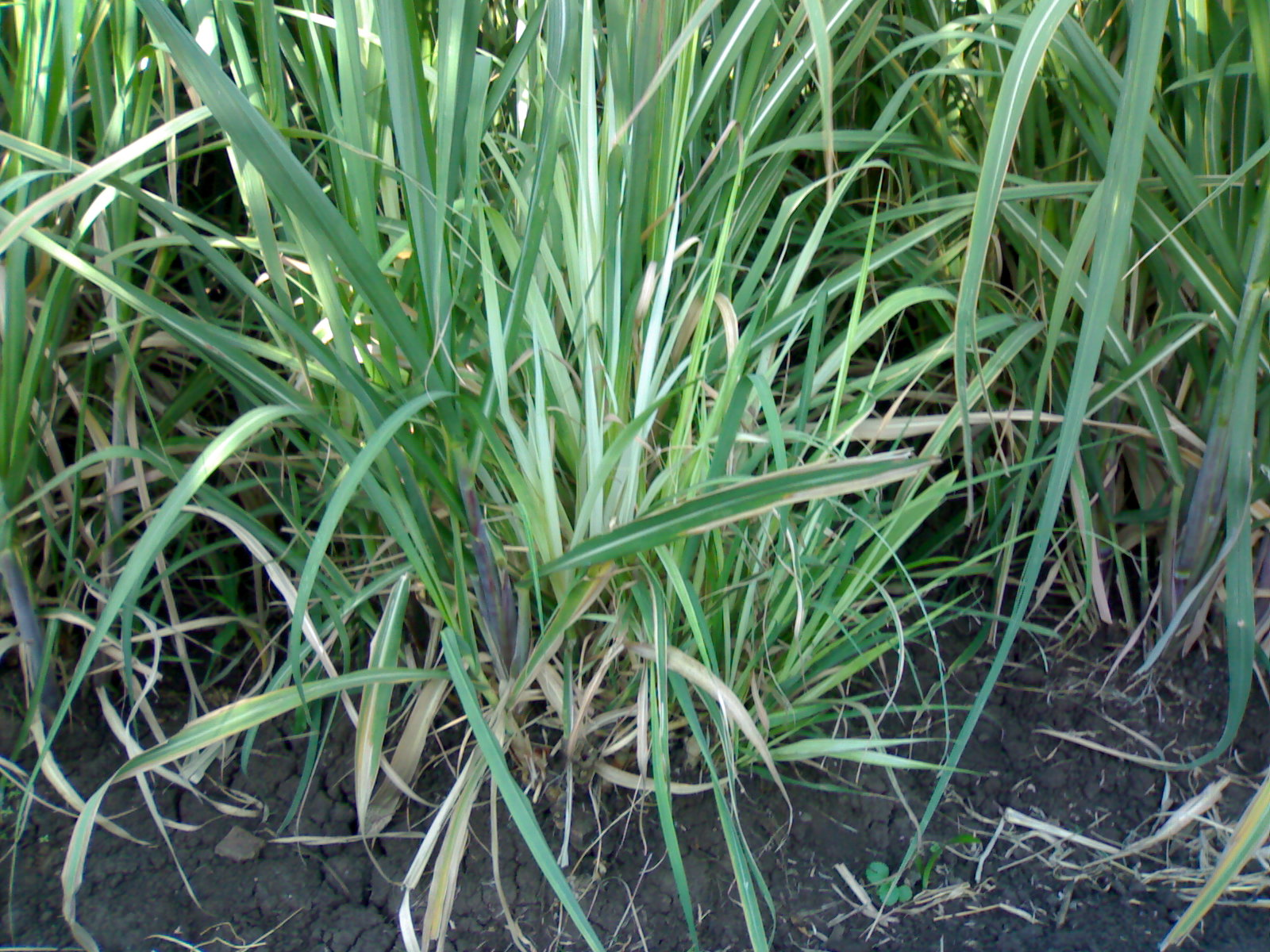
Sugarcane grassy shoot disease

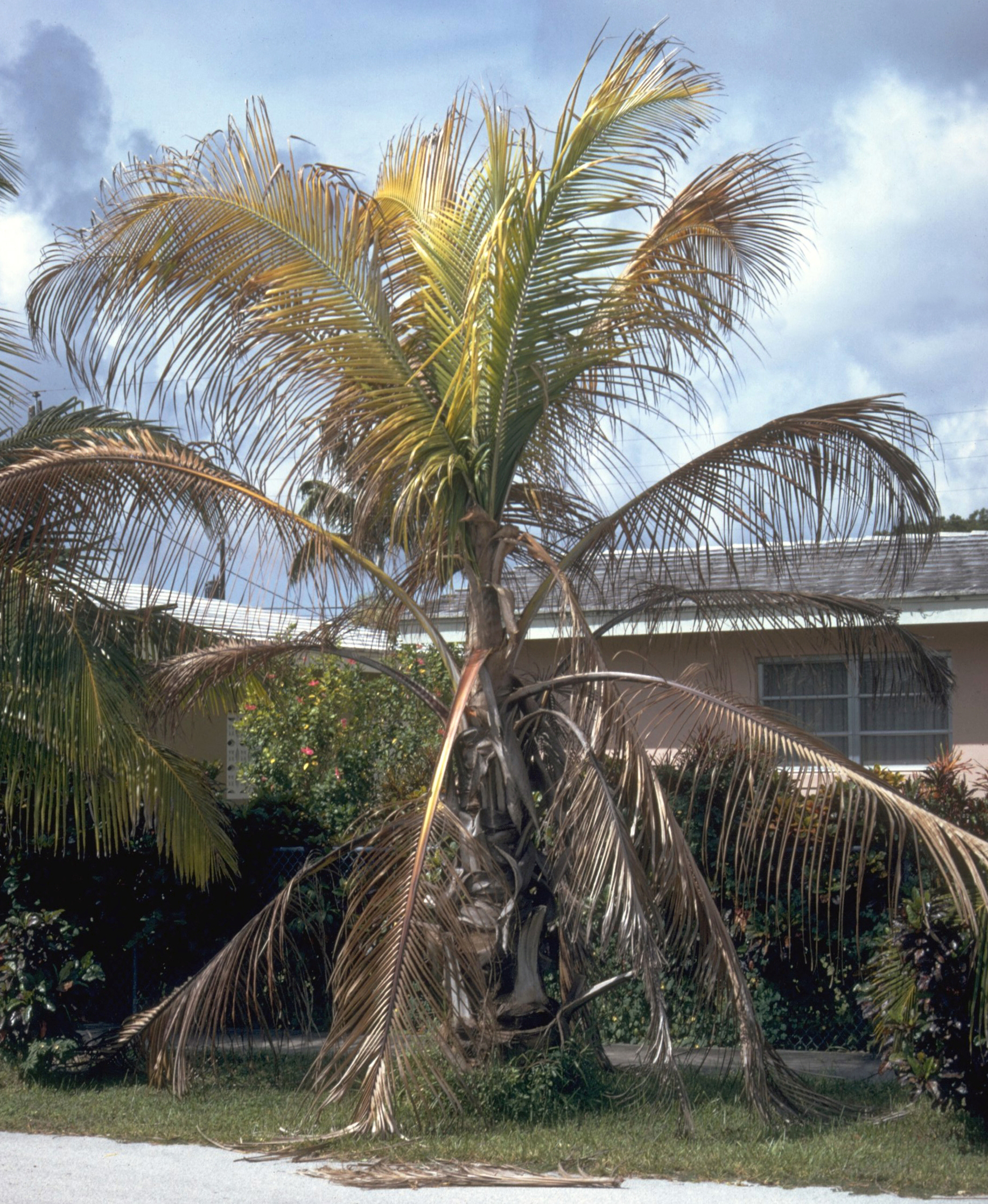
A palm tree dying of lethal yellowing phytoplasma

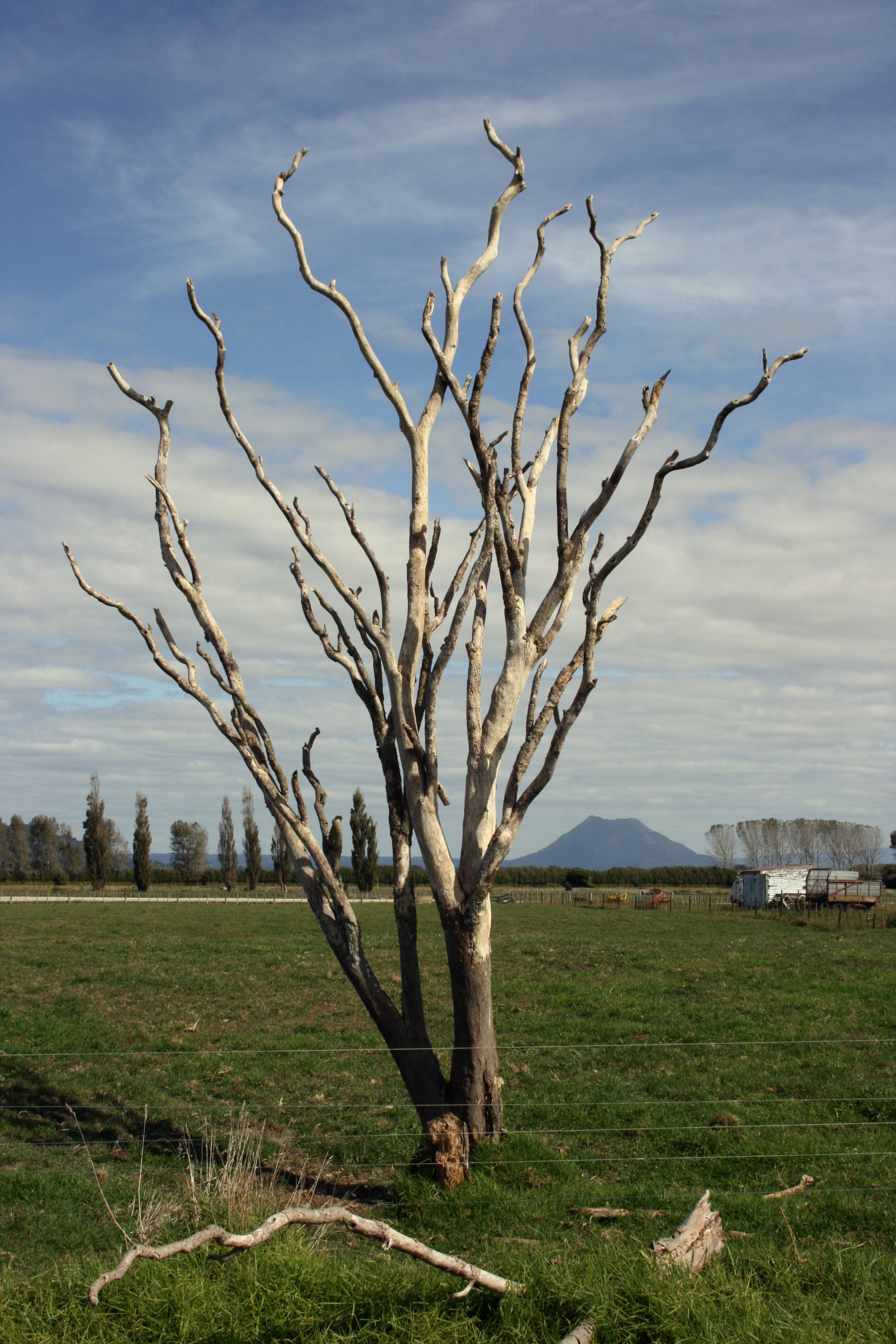
A cabbage tree killed by Phytoplasma australiense

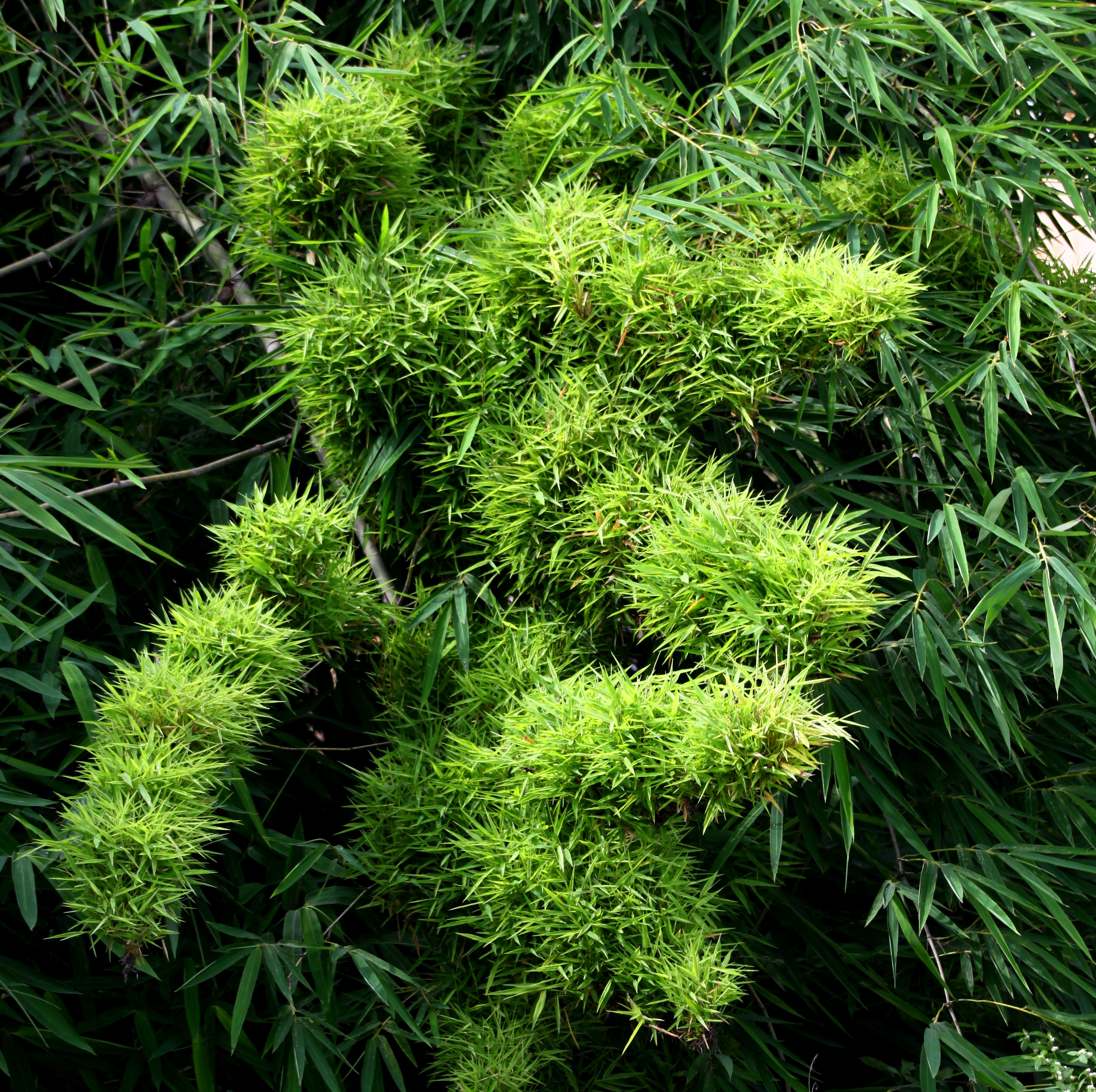
Witches' broom on bamboo (Dendrocalamus strictus)

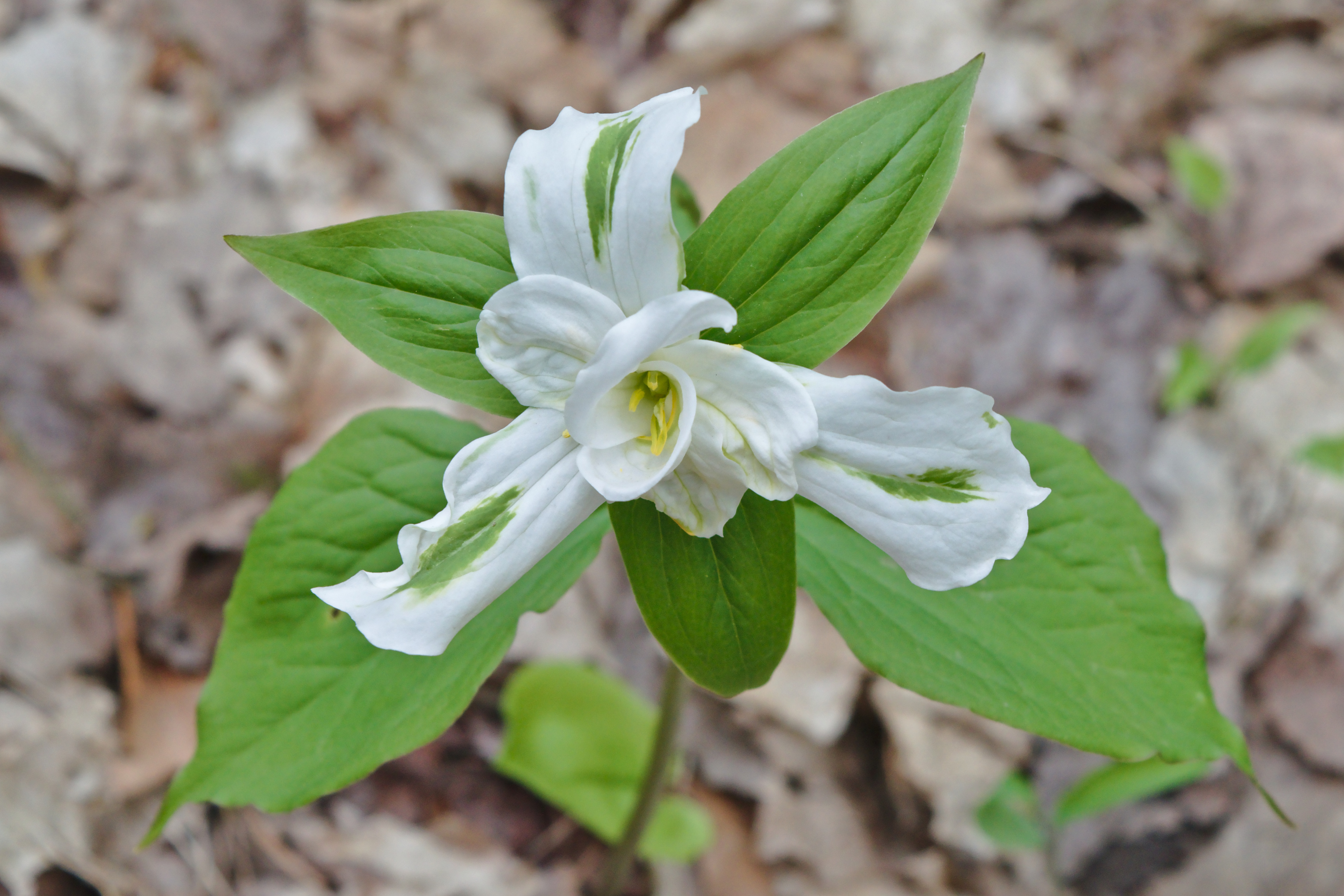
Trillium grandiflorum with virescent petals

== See also ==
- Cherry X-disease
- Elm yellows
- Grapevine yellows
- List of taxa with candidatus status
- Milkweed yellows phytoplasma
- List of bacterial orders
- List of bacteria genera
