= Flavescence dorée =

Disease of plants

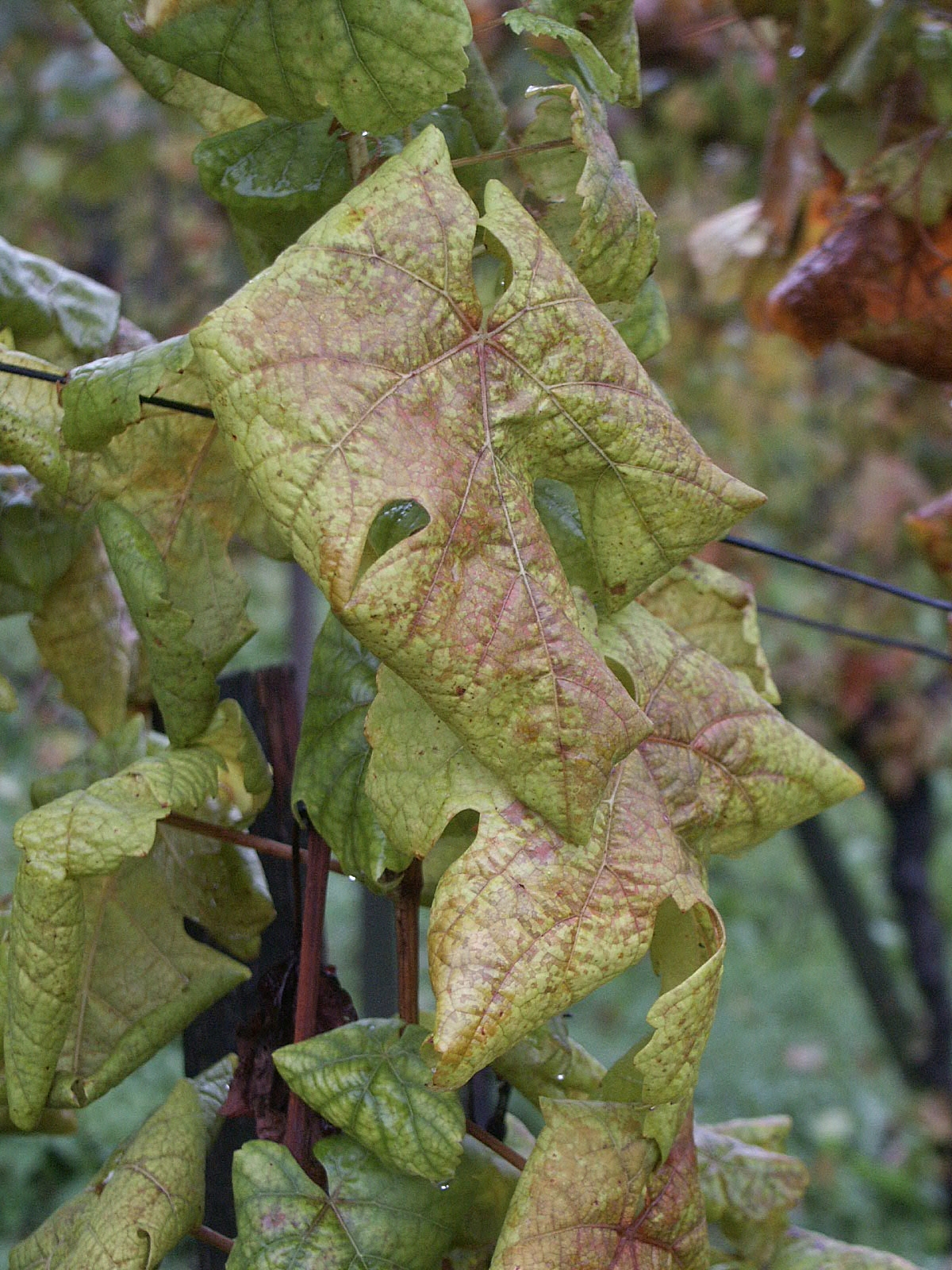
- Symptoms on leaves
- Common names: flavescence dorée of grapevine
- Causal agents: Candidatus Phytoplasma vitis
- Hosts: Vine
- Vectors: Scaphoideus titanus
- EPPO Code: PHYP64
- Distribution: Europe (France, Switzerland, Germany, Italy), United States, Australia
- Treatment: uprooting of infected plants

Flavescence dorée (from French "Flavescence" : yellowing and "dorée" : golden) is one of the most important and damaging phytoplasma diseases of the vine with the potential to threaten vineyards. The bacterial agent has recently been named Candidatus Phytoplasma vitis, and its vector is the leafhopper, Scaphoideus titanus. Infection may kill young vines and greatly reduce the productivity of old vines. It is classified as a phytoplasma disease belonging to the group generically termed grapevine yellows. Occurrences are in sporadic epidemics, and varieties vary in their sensitivity to it.

There is no cure at the moment and the way to manage its spread is by uprooting infected plants and by using selective insecticides in an area-wide pest management approach in order to reduce the hemipteran vectors.

A cure might be able to be developed using Auxin to stimulate the plant's defenses.

== Symptoms ==
The incubation period between infection and obvious symptoms is usually one year or more, depending on the response of the plant to both pathogen and environmental circumstances. Flavescence dorée has the following symptoms:

- leaves become yellow or red, depending on the variety
- downward rolling of leaves
- drying of stems and grapes
- there is no cold hardening

Some plants affected with Flavescence dorée may die, some may be asymptomatic while some, depending on the grapevine variety, can recover in a process currently not completely understood. The S. titanus can not get the Flavescence dorée from recovered and asymptomatic plants.

== Tests ==
The Phytoplasma bacterium species responsible for the disease cannot be cultured in vitro in cell-free media. Quantitative PCR can be used for the early detection of the bacterium in the plant.

== Biology ==
Ca. Phytoplasma vitis is part of the 16SrV group (group name: Elm yellows) in the Phytoplasma taxonomy.

== History ==
Flavescence dorée first appeared in 1949 in the Armagnac region of south west France. Its insect vector, S. titanus, was originally native to the Eastern United States and Canada and is believed to have been introduced to Europe either during World War II or earlier with American rootstock brought in to fight off phylloxera. Spreading steadily throughout France, it had by 1987 reached the wine growing regions of Cognac, Languedoc and northern and southern Rhône, and by 1992 the Loire Valley, and Bordeaux. Variants of the disease are found in Switzerland, Germany, Italy, New York state, Slovenia, and Australia.

The period of milder winters and warmer springs and falls at the beginning of the 21st century allowed S. titanus to have longer periods to complete, which is a probable reason for the increase of its population and expansion in western, eastern and southern Europe. Although Scaphoideus titanus descends from North America, flavescence dorée is not reported in USA and Canada.

== Management ==
Without control measures to manage Flavescence dorée it can infect all vines in a vineyard within only a couple of years.

There is no cure at the moment and the way to manage its spread is by:

- uprooting infected plants,
- using selective insecticides in an area-wide pest management approach in order to reduce the hemipteran vectors
- careful monitoring of the propagation material

Complete suppression of Flavescence dorée is not possible only with insecticides because they reduce populations of S. titanus in average by about 80-95%. That is why uprooting of infected plants should be combined with insecticide application.

During the period of activity of adult vector it is strongly recommended to avoid any kind of mechanical or chemical control of host plants because its unavailability could drive infected vector to disperse to other noninfected plants.

It has been proposed by Antoine Caudwell, a French agriculturist who was a pioneer in research on grapevine phytoplasma diseases such as flavescence dorée, to treat plant material with hot water since 1966. When later works proved the effectiveness of the hot water treatment it was recognized in EU Directive and some other organizations.

A phytoplasma disease in periwinkle was shown to be cured by treatement of Auxin, a plant growth hormone that could have a role in plant defense. Auxin might be effective in grapes to counter Flavescence dorée.

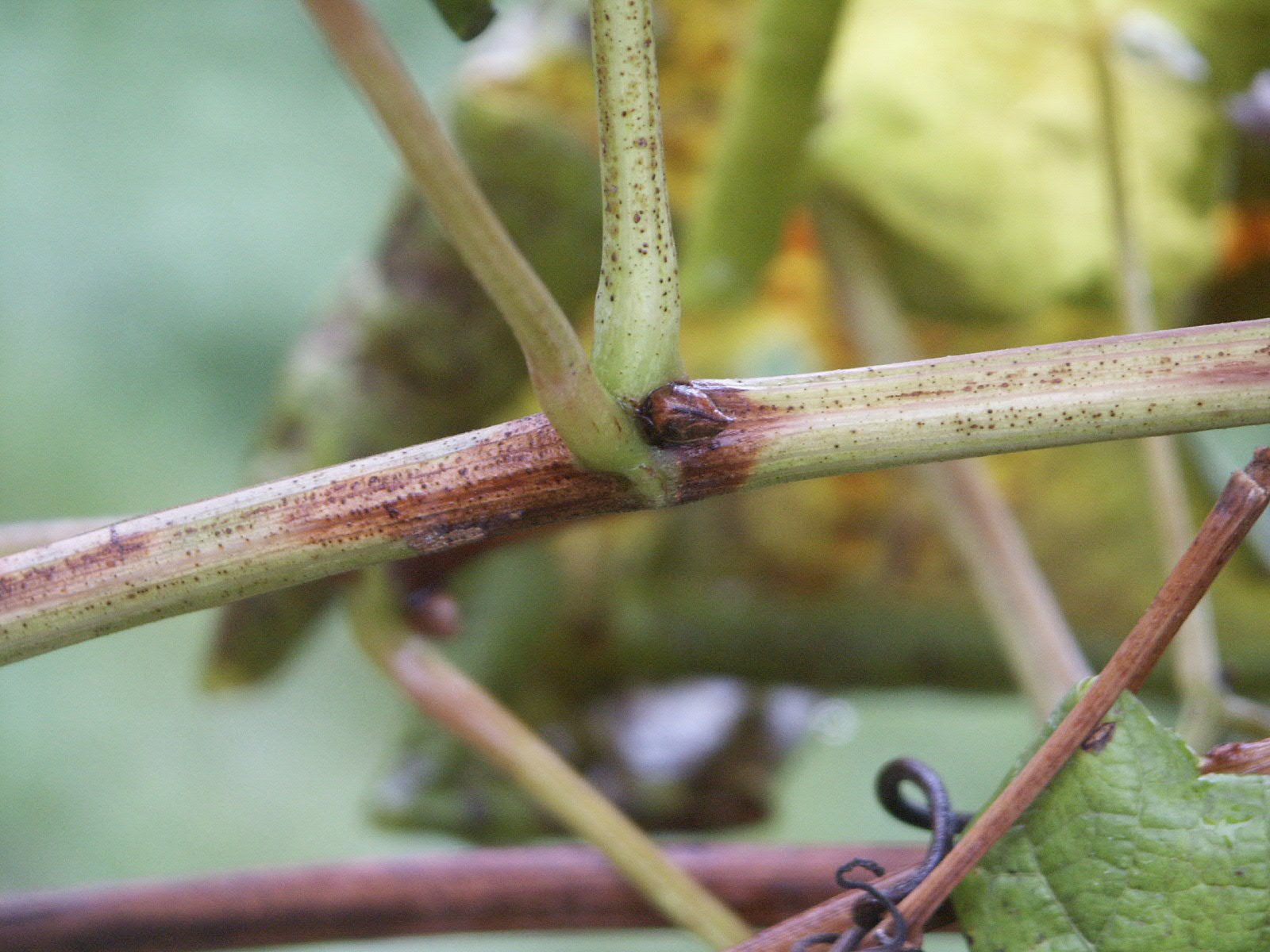
Symptoms on German variety Scheurebe

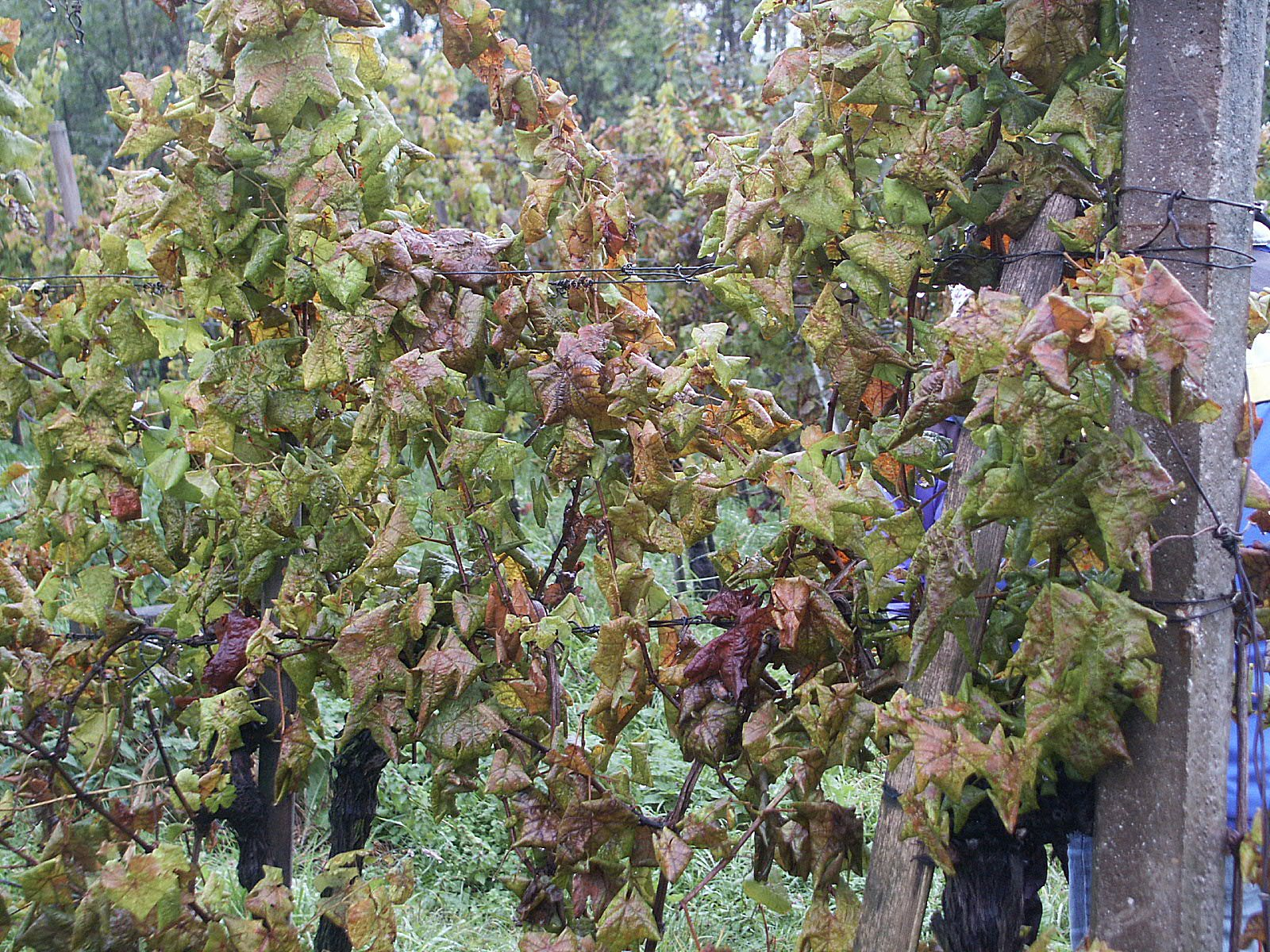
Symptoms on German variety Scheurebe

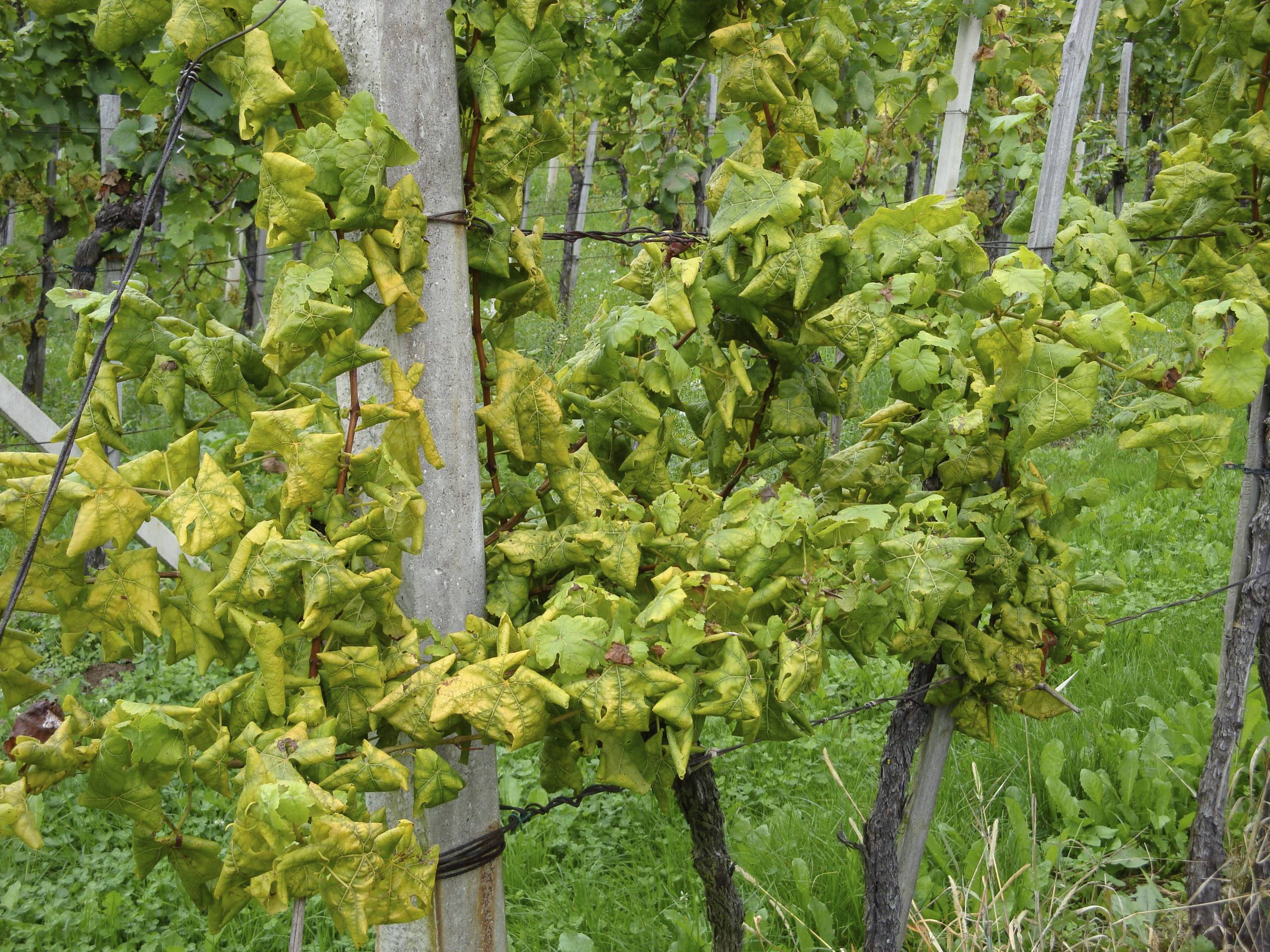
Symptoms on German variety Scheurebe

== See also ==
- List of grape diseases
- black wood of grapevine or "Stolbur" or "Bois noir", another vine disease due to a Phytoplasma species
