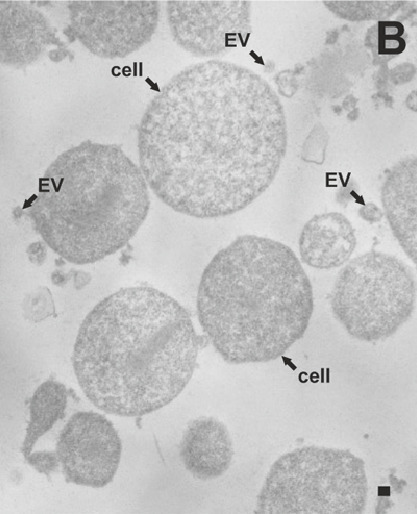
- Acholeplasma laidwalii cells and extracellular vesicles

Scientific classification
- Domain: Bacteria
- Kingdom: Bacillati
- Phylum: Mycoplasmatota
- Class: Mollicutes
- Order: Acholeplasmatales
- Family: Acholeplasmataceae
- Genus: Acholeplasma; Edward & Freundt 1970

Type species
- Acholeplasma laidlawii (Sabin 1941) Edward & Freundt 1970

Species
- A. equifetale; A. equirhinis; A. granularum; A. hippikon; A. laidlawii; "A. manati"; A. oculi; A. pleciae

Synonyms
- "Sapromyces" Sabin 1941 non Fritsch 1893

= Acholeplasma =

Genus of bacteria

Acholeplasma are wall-less bacteria in the Mollicutes class. They include saprotrophic or pathogenic species. There are 15 recognised species. The G+C content is low, ranging from 26 – 36% (mol%). The genomes of Acholeplasma species range in size from 1.5 to 1.65 Mbp. Cholesterol is not required for growth. The species are found on animals, and some plants and insects. The optimum growth temperature is 30 to 37 degrees Celsius.

Acholeplasma laidlawii is a common contaminant of cell culture media products, and has also been used in extensive studies of lipid polymorphism because this organism alters its ratio of MGlcDG (monoglucosyl diacylglycerol) to DGlcDG (diglucosyl diacylglycerol) in response to growth conditions.

== Phylogeny ==
16S rRNA based LTP_10_2024

- Acholeplasma
  - - A. equifetale Kirchoff 1974
    - - A. hippikon Kirchoff 1974
      - A. equirhinis Volokhov et al. 2020
  - - A. oculi corrig. Al-Aubaidi et al. 1973
    - - A. granulara corrig. (Switzer 1964) Edward & Freundt 1970
      - - A. laidlawii (Sabin 1941) Edward & Freundt 1970
        - A. pleciae (Tully et al. 1994) Knight Jr. 2004

120 marker proteins based GTDB 09-RS220

- Acholeplasma
  - A. equifetale
  - - A. hippikon
    - - A. equirhinis
      - - A. oculi
        - - A. granulara
          - A. laidlawii

== See also ==
- List of bacteria genera
- List of bacterial orders
