= Grapevine yellows =

Diseases associated to phytoplasmas

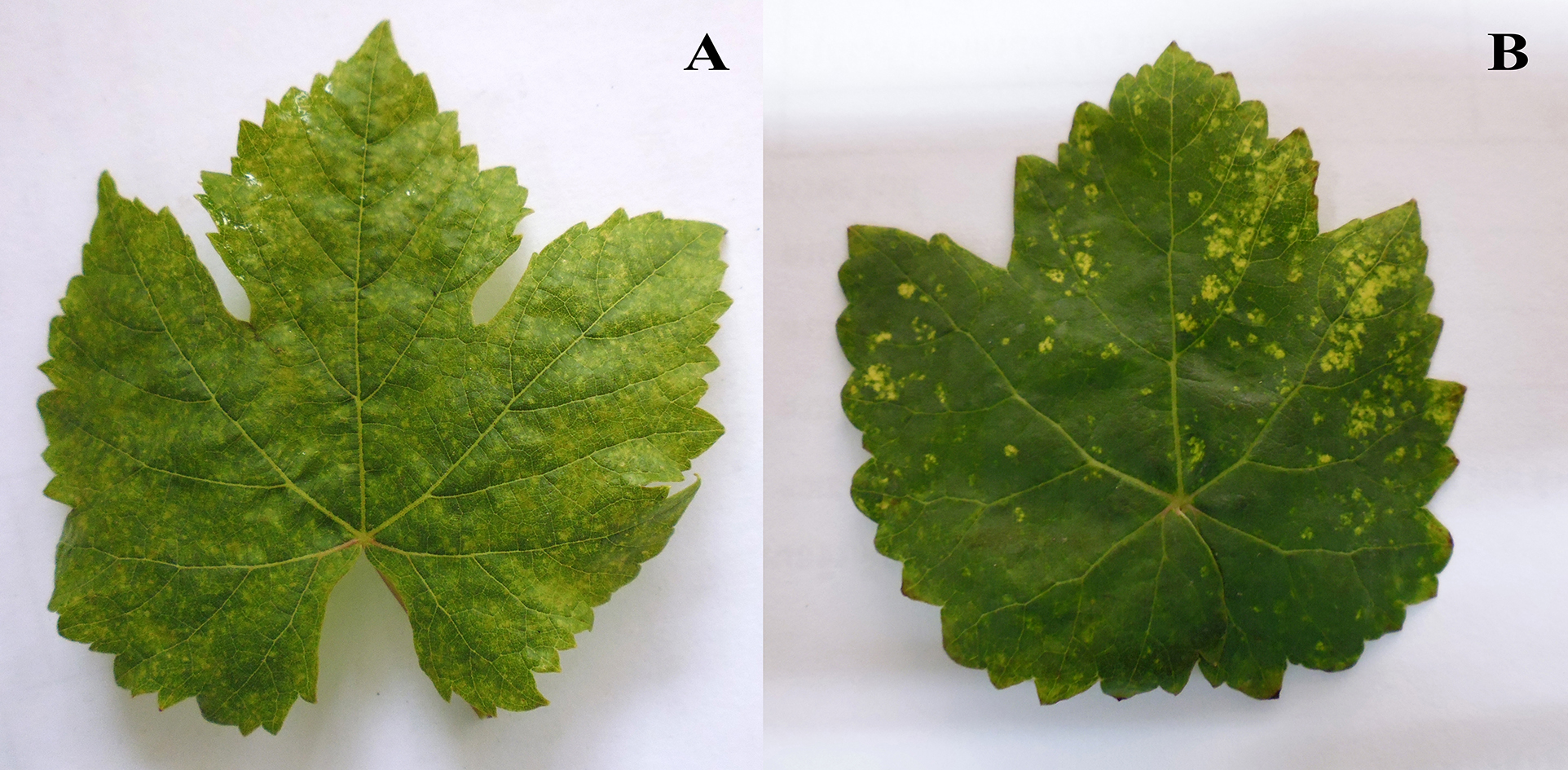
- Grapevine yellow speckle viroid
- Common names: GY
- Causal agents: Phytoplasmas
- Hosts: Grapes

Grapevine yellows (GY) are diseases associated to phytoplasmas that occur in many grape growing areas worldwide and are of still increasing significance. The most important grapevine yellows is flavescence dorée.

Phytoplasmas are obligate cell wall-less bacterial pathogens (class Mollicutes), and rely on plants and homopterous phloem-sucking insects for biological dispersal. In plants, they are mainly restricted to the phloem tissue where they can move and multiply through the sieve tube elements. Almost identical symptoms of the GY syndrome are caused by different phytoplasmas and appear on leaves, shoots and clusters of grapevine. Typical symptoms include discoloration and necrosis of leaf veins and leaf blades, downward curling of leaves, lack or incomplete lignification of shoots, stunting and necrosis of shoots, abortion of inflorescences and shrivelling of berries. Those symptoms are related to callose deposition at the sieve plates and subsequent degeneration of the phloem. Although no resistant cultivars of Vitis vinifera or rootstocks are known so far, the various grape varieties differ considerably as far as symptom severity is concerned. Chardonnay and Riesling are among the most vulnerable varieties. It ranges from fast decline and death in highly susceptible cultivars to tolerant rootstocks as symptomless carriers of the pathogen. Currently, the only available control strategies include early eradication of infected crops, early eradication of infected source plants (weed control), and chemical control of vectors through regular insecticide treatments.

The main viticultural production areas in the Republic of North Macedonia were surveyed in 2006/2007/2008 for the presence of grapevine yellows. PCR and RFLP analyses were used to detect and identify phytoplasmas infecting grapevines. Only phytoplasmas associated with “bois noir” disease (ribosomal subgroup 16SrXII-A or stolbur) were detected. Molecular analyses showed that all phytoplasmas identified belonged to tuf-type II (VKII).
