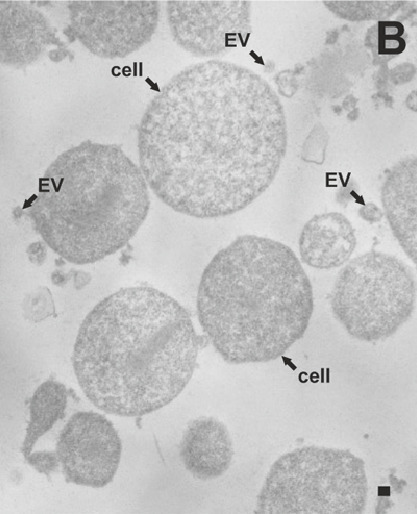
- Acholeplasma laidwalii cells and extracellular vesicles

Scientific classification
- Domain: Bacteria
- Kingdom: Bacillati
- Phylum: Mycoplasmatota
- Class: Mollicutes
- Order: Acholeplasmatales
- Family: Acholeplasmataceae; Edward & Freundt 1970

Genera
- Acholeplasma; Alteracholeplasma; Haploplasma; Mariniplasma; Paracholeplasma; "Peloplasma"; "Ca. Phytoplasma"; "Pluraplasma"

Synonyms
- "Sapromycetaceae" Sabin 1941; "Saprophytaceae" Sabin 1941

= Acholeplasmataceae =

Family of bacteria

Acholeplasmataceae is a family of bacteria. It is the only family in the order Acholeplasmatales, placed in the class Mollicutes. The family comprises the genera Acholeplasma and Phytoplasma. Phytoplasma has the candidatus status, because members still could not be cultured.

Etymology: The names Acholeplasmataceae and Acholetoplasmatales are derived from the Greek a = not, cholè = bile and plasma = anything moulded or formed.
Species in the order Acholeplasmatales can grow in a medium without cholesterol, unlike species in the order Mycoplasmatales. Cholesterol, a sterol, is an important component of the cell membrane of mycoplasmas, whereas in acholeplasmas and in bacteria in general it is absent.

== Characteristics ==
Members of Acholeplasmatales are facultative anaerobic. They are parasites or commensals of vertebrates, insects, or plants; some are saprophytes.

Phytoplasmas colonize the phloem sieve elements of vascular plants, causing diseases. They are transmitted by sap-sucking insects (primarily leafhoppers, planthoppers, and psyllids ), living in the gut, haemolymph, salivary gland and other organs. Like other mollicutes, they show a high host specificity.

== Classification ==
In the first taxonomy of Mollicutes, the classification was based on requiring or not requiring cholesterol for growth. The old order Mycoplasmatales consisted of two families: Mycoplasmataceae, which requires cholesterol, and the sterol-nonrequiring Acholeplasmataceae. In view of the many properties in which the acholeplasmas distinguish from species in Mycoplasmataceae and Spiroplasmataceae, Freundt et al. proposed in 1984 to elevate the family Acholeplasmataceae to the ordinal rank Acholeplasmatales, thus separating it from Mycoplasmatales.

In 1987, the division in sterol requiring and not requiring changed with the addition of a third order, Anaeroplasmatales, taking into account that dependence on anaerobic growth conditions is an important characteristic.

The currently accepted taxonomy is based on the List of Prokaryotic names with Standing in Nomenclature (LPSN) and National Center for Biotechnology Information (NCBI)

16S rRNA based LTP_10_2024

- Acholeplasmataceae
  - Paracholeplasma
  - - Haploplasma [incl. Alteracholeplasma]
    - - - Acholeplasma palmae Tully et al. 1994
        - Mariniplasma
      - - Mycoplasma feliminutum Heyward, Sabry & Dowdle 1969
        - Acholeplasma

120 marker proteins based GTDB 09-RS220

- - UBA5453
    Paracholeplasma Watanabe et al. 2021
  - Acholeplasmataceae
    - - Mariniplasma corrig. Watanabe et al. 2021
      - Haploplasma Watanabe et al. 2021
    - - Acholeplasma Edward & Freundt 1970
      - - Alteracholeplasma Watanabe et al. 2021
        - "Ca. Phytoplasma" Firrao et al. 2004

== See also ==
- List of bacteria genera
- List of bacterial orders
