= Fasciation =

Condition of abnormal growth in vascular plants

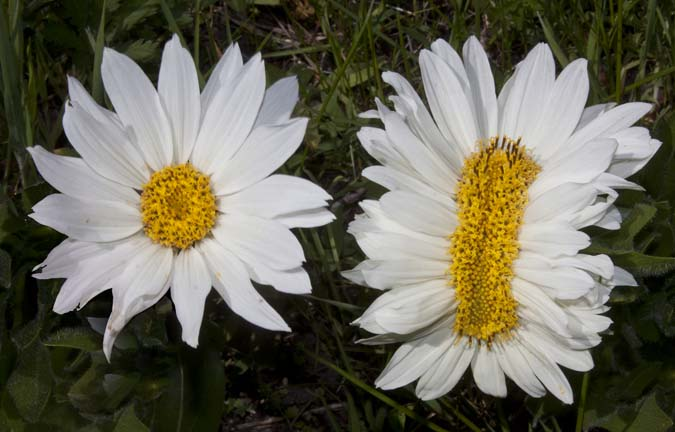
Wyethia helianthoides or mule's ear wildflower (on right) showing fasciation

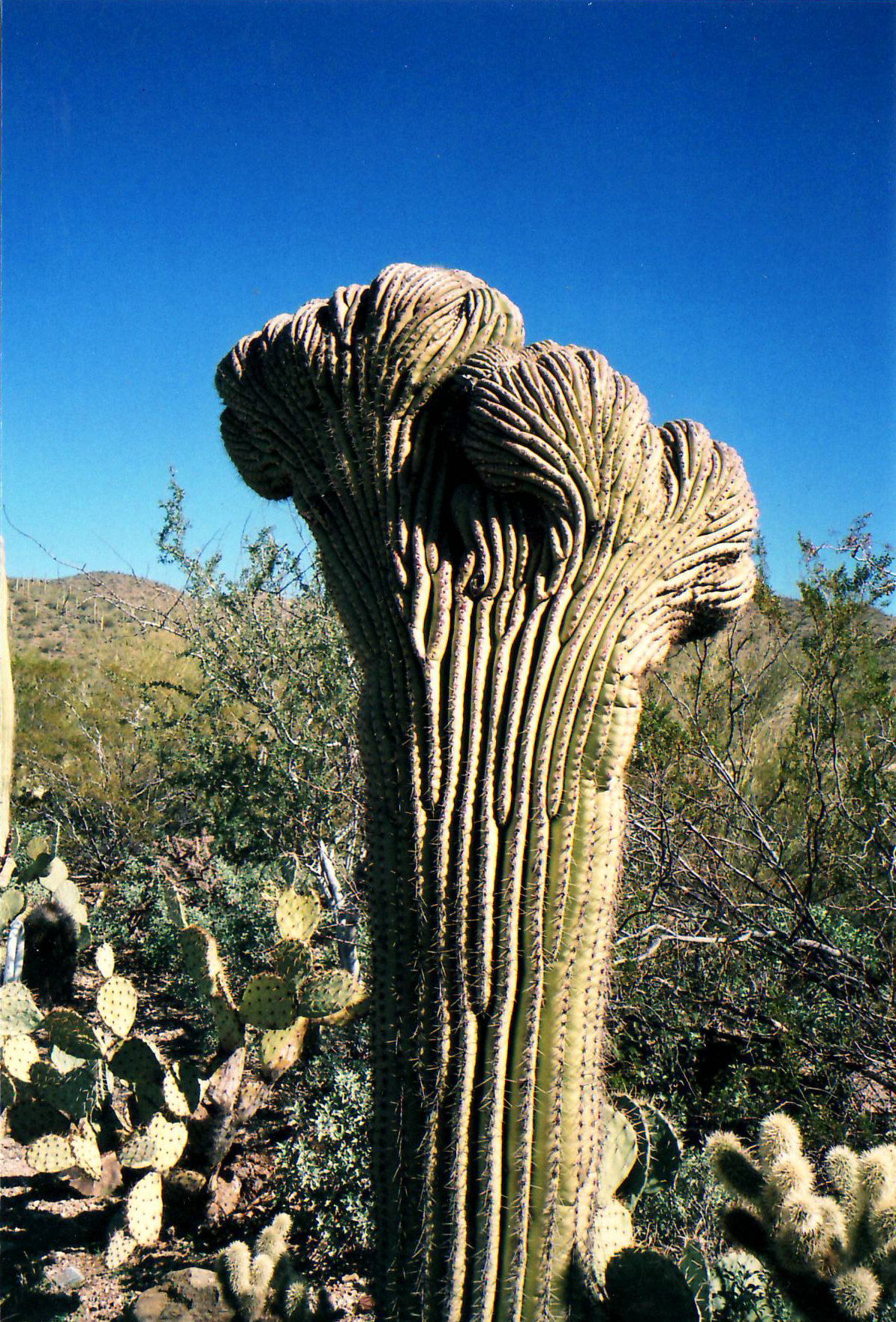
A "crested" saguaro cactus (Carnegiea gigantea), resulting from fasciation, located at Saguaro National Park (West), Arizona, U.S.

Fasciation (pronounced /ˌfæʃiˈeɪʃən/, from the Latin root meaning "band" or "stripe"), also known as cresting, is a relatively rare condition of abnormal growth in vascular plants in which the apical meristem (growing tip), which normally is concentrated around a single point and produces approximately cylindrical tissue, instead becomes elongated perpendicularly to the direction of growth, thus producing flattened, ribbon-like, crested (or "cristate"), or elaborately contorted tissue. Fasciation may also cause plant parts to increase in weight and volume in some instances. The phenomenon may occur in the stem, root, fruit, or flower head. Affected flowers may be referred to as "double-headed" or "two-headed", not to be confused with double-flowered flowers.

Some plants are grown and prized aesthetically for their fasciation. Any occurrence of fasciation has several possible causes, including hormonal, genetic, bacterial, fungal, viral or environmental causes.

== Cause ==
Fasciation can be caused by hormonal imbalances in the meristematic cells of plants, which are cells where growth can occur. Fasciation can also be caused by random genetic mutation. Bacterial and viral infections can also cause fasciation. The bacterial phytopathogen Rhodococcus fascians has been demonstrated as one cause of fasciation, such as in sweet pea (Lathyrus odoratus) plants, and in lilies (Lilium longiflorum), but many fasciated plants have tested negative for the bacteria in studies, hence bacterial infection is not an exclusive causation.

Additional environmental factors that can cause fasciation include fungi, mite or insect attack and exposure to chemicals. General damage to a plant's growing tip and exposure to cold and frost can also cause fasciation. Some plants, such as peas and cockscomb Celosia, may inherit the trait.

Genetic fasciation is not contagious, but infectious fasciation can be spread from infected plants to others from contact with wounds on infected plants, and from water that carries the bacteria to other plants.

== Occurrence ==
Although fasciation is rare overall, it has been observed in over 100 vascular plant families, including members of the genera Acer, Aloe, Acanthosicyos, Cannabis, Celosia, Cycas, Delphinium, Digitalis, Echinacea, Echinopsis, Euphorbia, Forsythia, Glycine max (specifically, soybean plants), Primula, Iochroma, Prunus, Salix, and many genera of the cactus family, Cactaceae. Cresting results in undulating folds instead of the typical "arms" found on mature saguaro cactus.

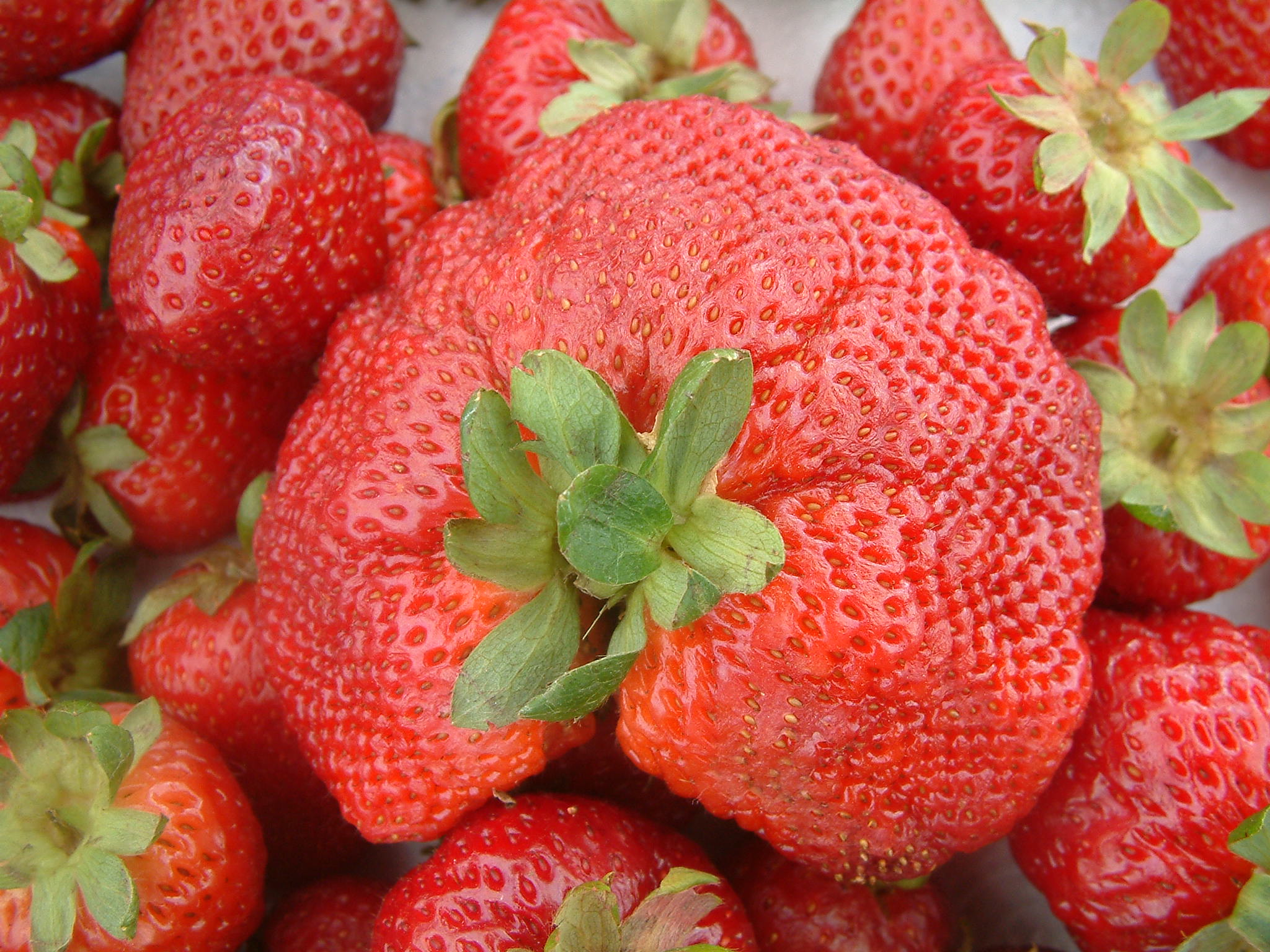
A "cockscomb" strawberry (Fragaria × ananassa)

Many strawberry (Fragaria spp.) cultivars are susceptible to fasciation, often in response to environmental stresses. As the fleshy edible portion of strawberries arises from the receptacle (a portion of the floral stem) rather than the ovary, strawberries that develop from fasciated stems also become fasciated, taking on a wedge or fan shape. Extreme examples are sometimes called "cockscomb" berries for their resemblance to a rooster's comb. Fasciated strawberries may be considered less marketable, but may also grow to extraordinary sizes: in 2021 a fasciated strawberry of the Ilan variety grown in Kadima-Zoran in central Israel was weighed at 289 grams (10.2 oz).

Some varieties of Celosia are raised especially for their dependably fasciated flower heads, for which they are also called "cockscomb". The Japanese fantail willow (Salix sachalinensis 'Sekka') is another plant that is valued for its fasciation.

== Prevention ==
Fasciation that is caused by bacteria can be controlled by not using fasciated plants and disposing of fasciated material. Avoiding injury to plant bases and keeping them dry can reduce the spread of bacteria. Avoidance of grafting fasciated plants and the pruning of fasciated matter can also reduce the spread of bacteria.

== Examples ==
Fasciation

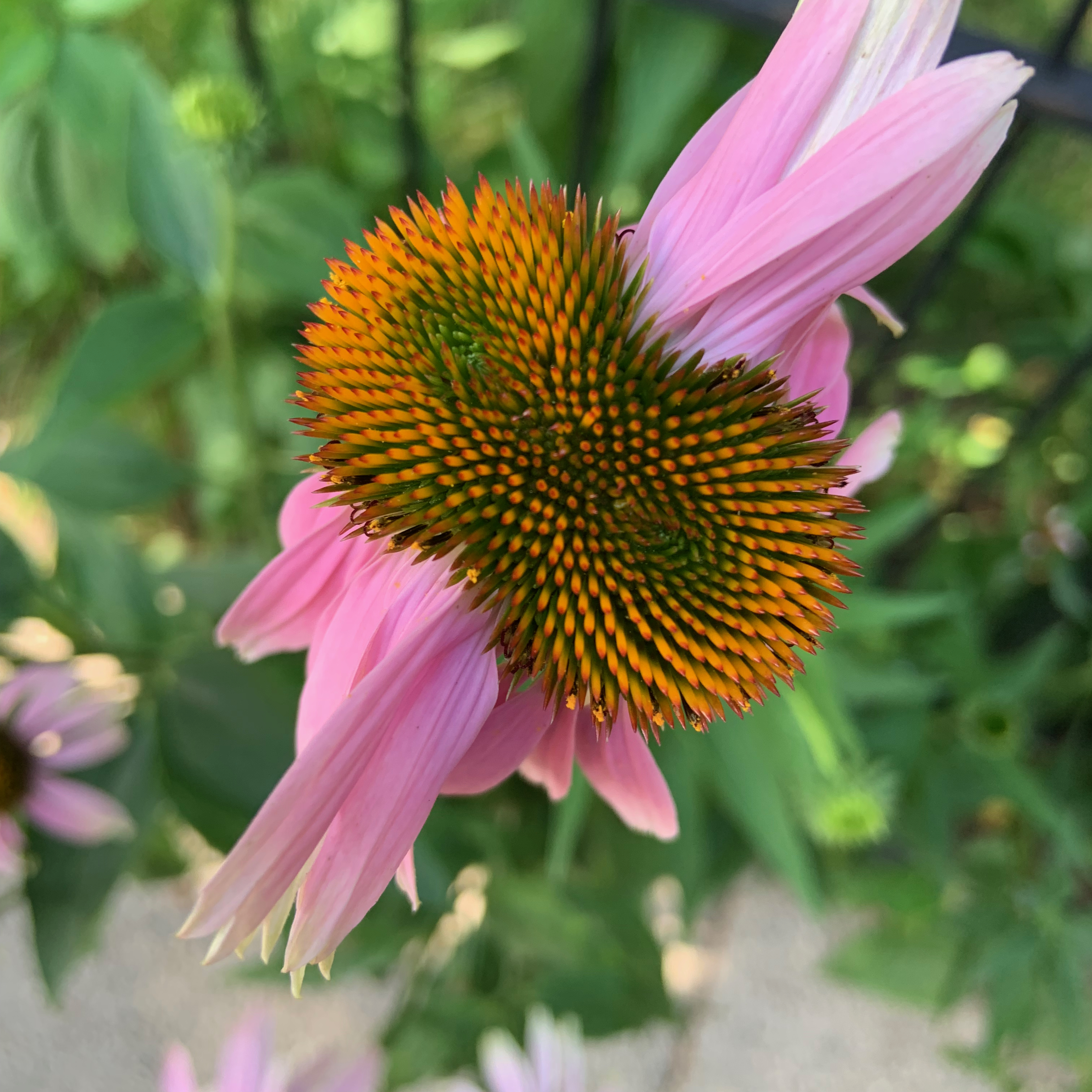
An example of fasciation, or "cresting," on a coneflower (Echinacea).

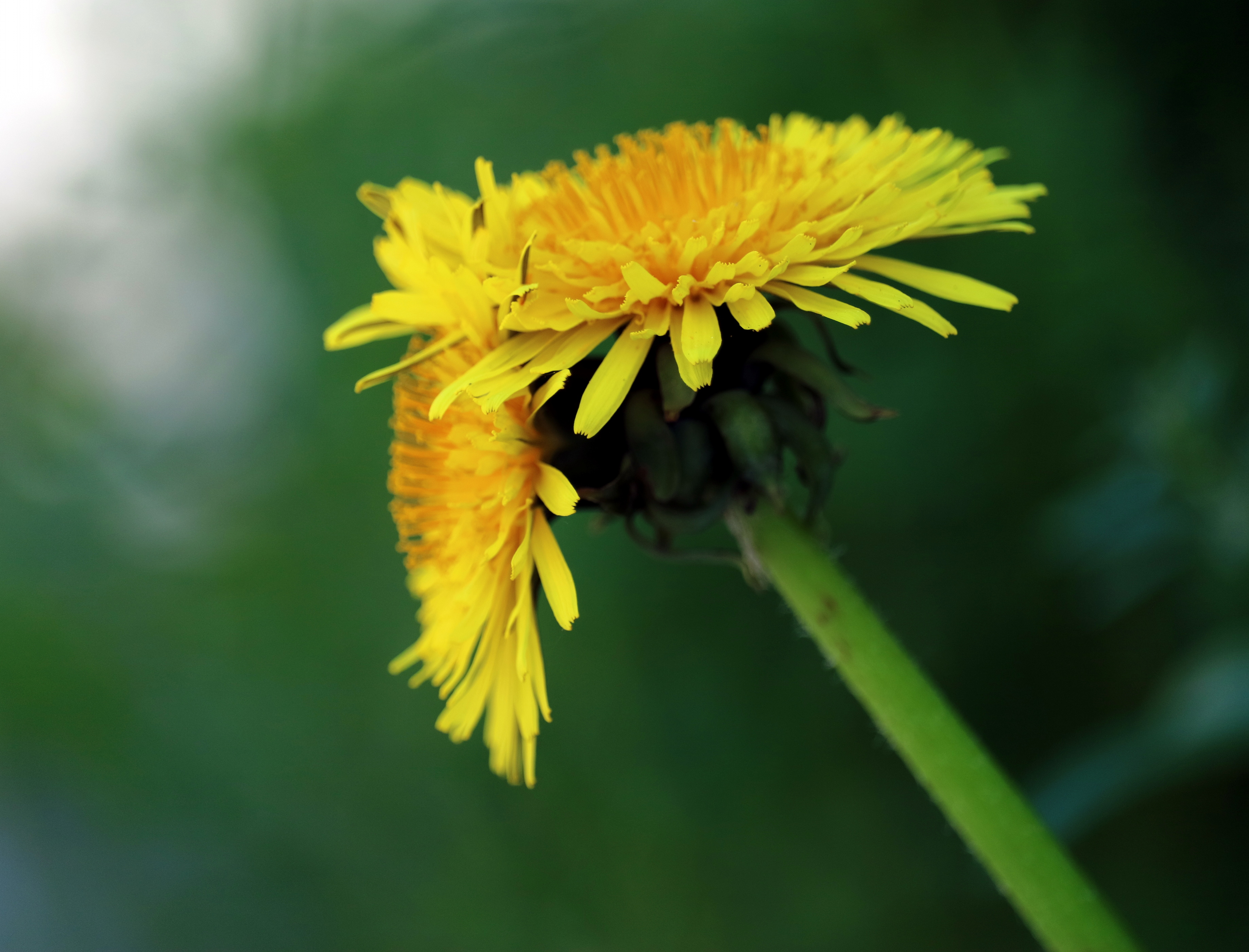
Fasciation leading to two fully formed flower heads on a dandelion.

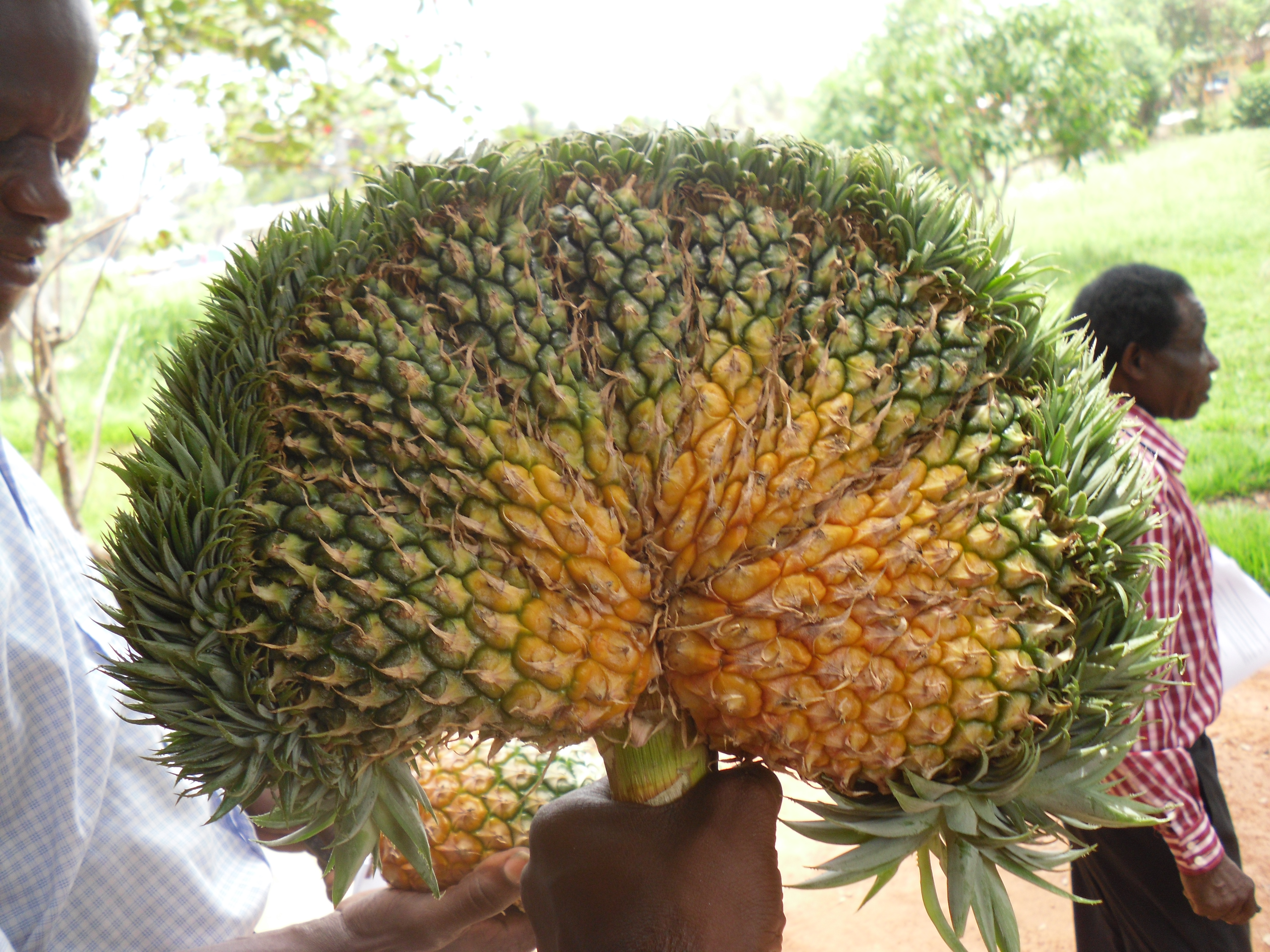
Pineapple

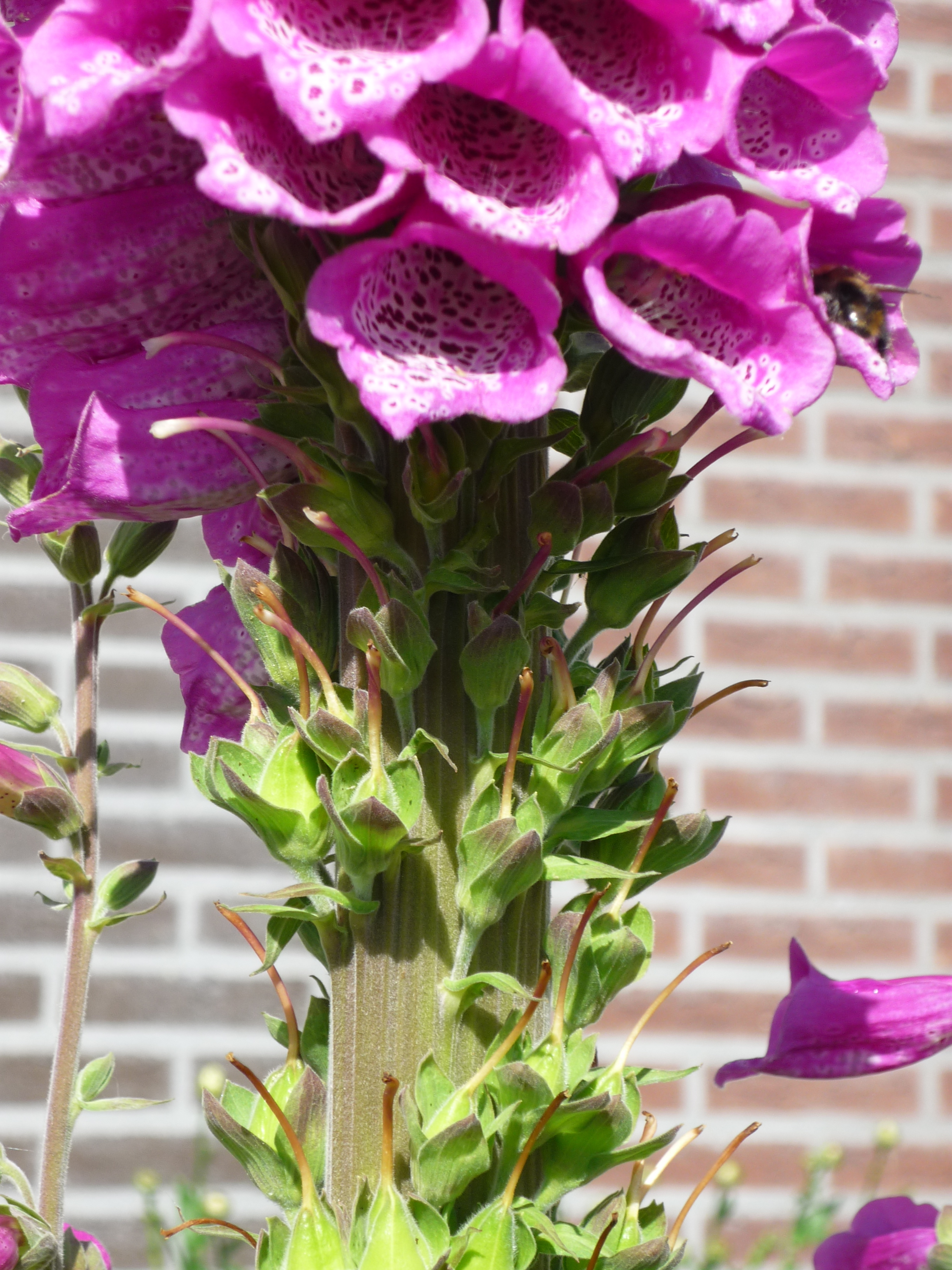
Fasciation on Digitalis. Note the larger thickened stem compared to the normal-sized flowering spike on the left.

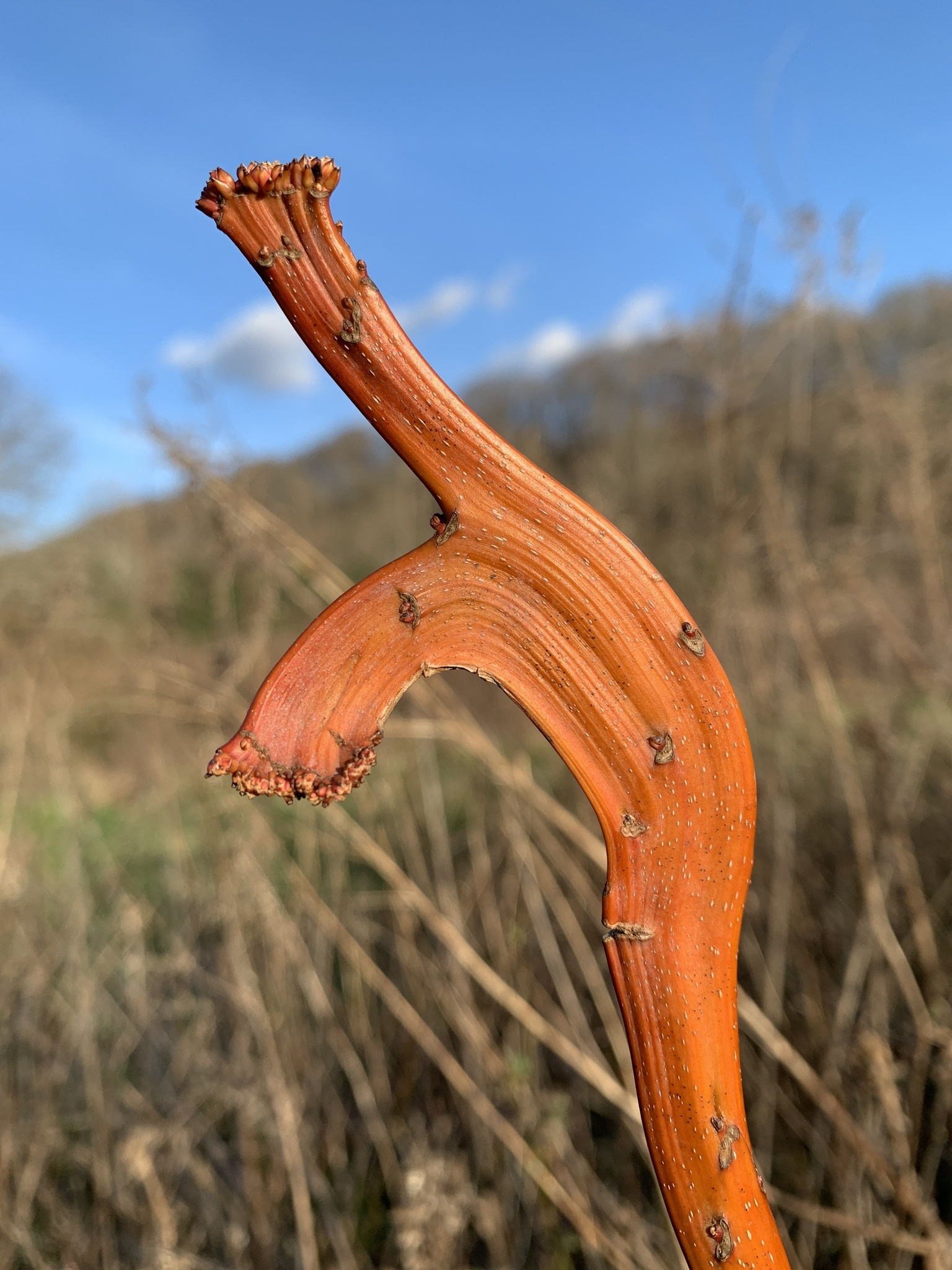
Fasciation on silver maple (Acer saccharinum) in Indiana, USA.

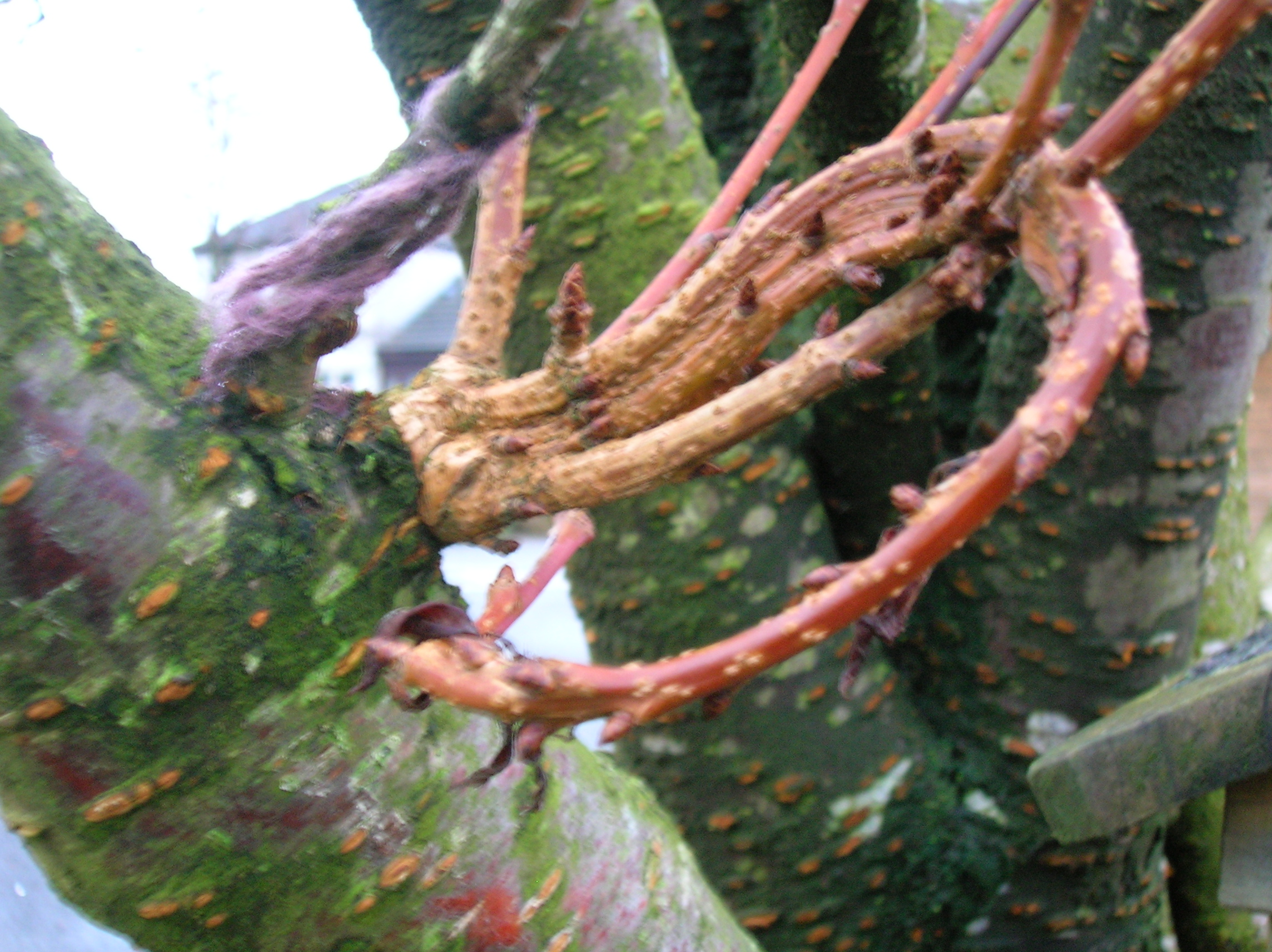
Fasciation on a flowering cherry (Prunus) tree

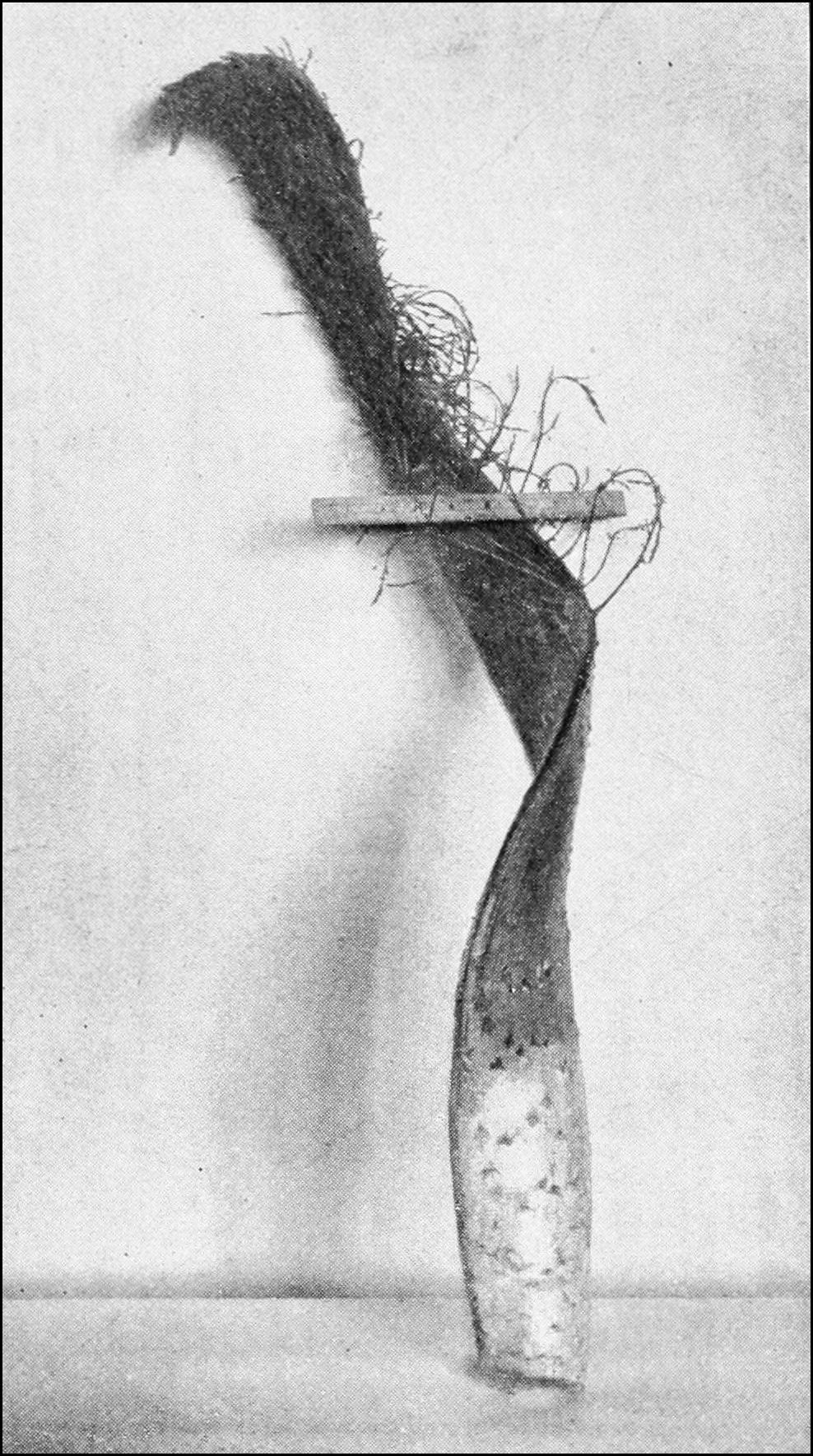
Asparagus (Asparagus officinalis) fasciation. Note the flattened state of the stem. Image published 1893.

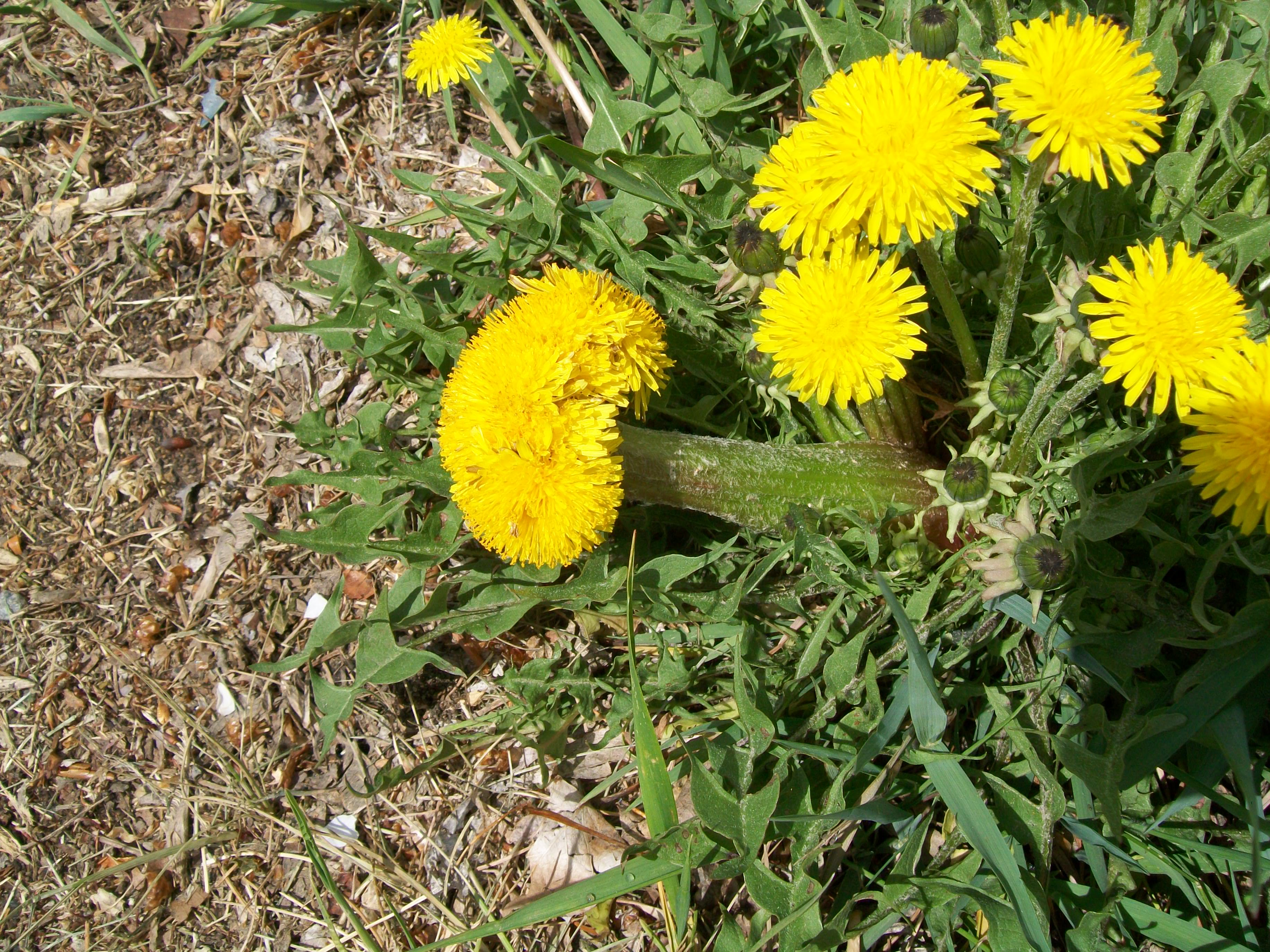
Common dandelion displaying both regular (upper right) and fasciated (center) flowers.

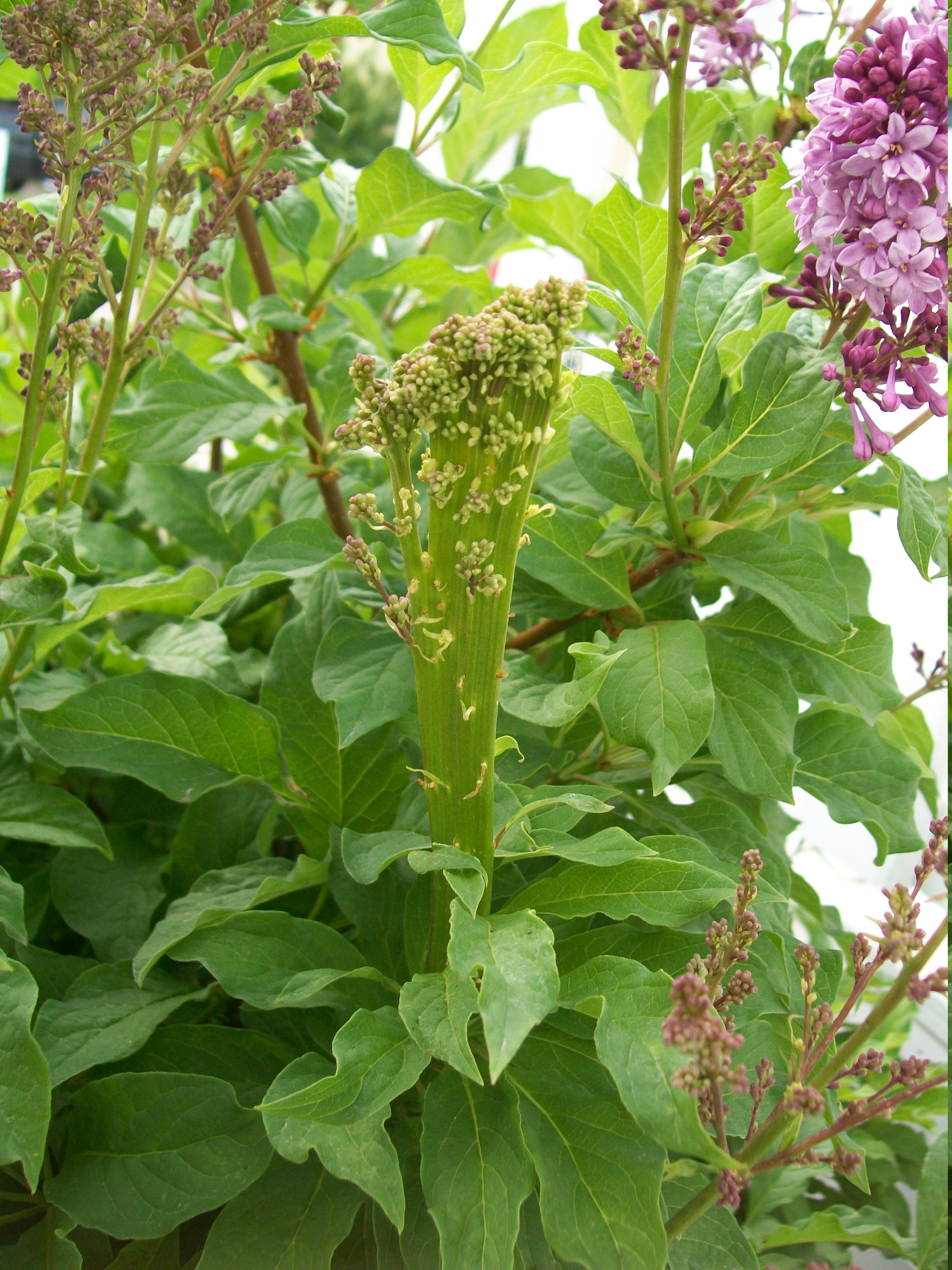
Fasciation on a lilac shrub.

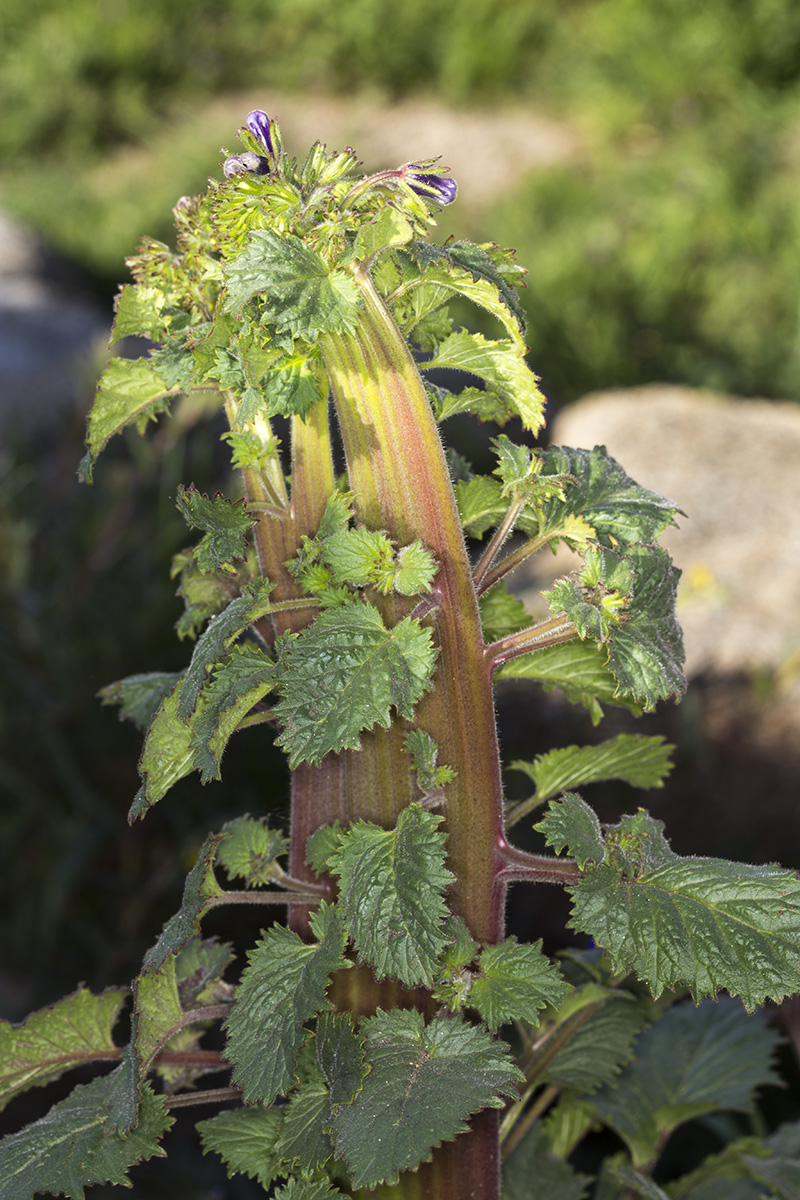
Fasciation on a Phacelia campanularia or California bluebell wildflower.

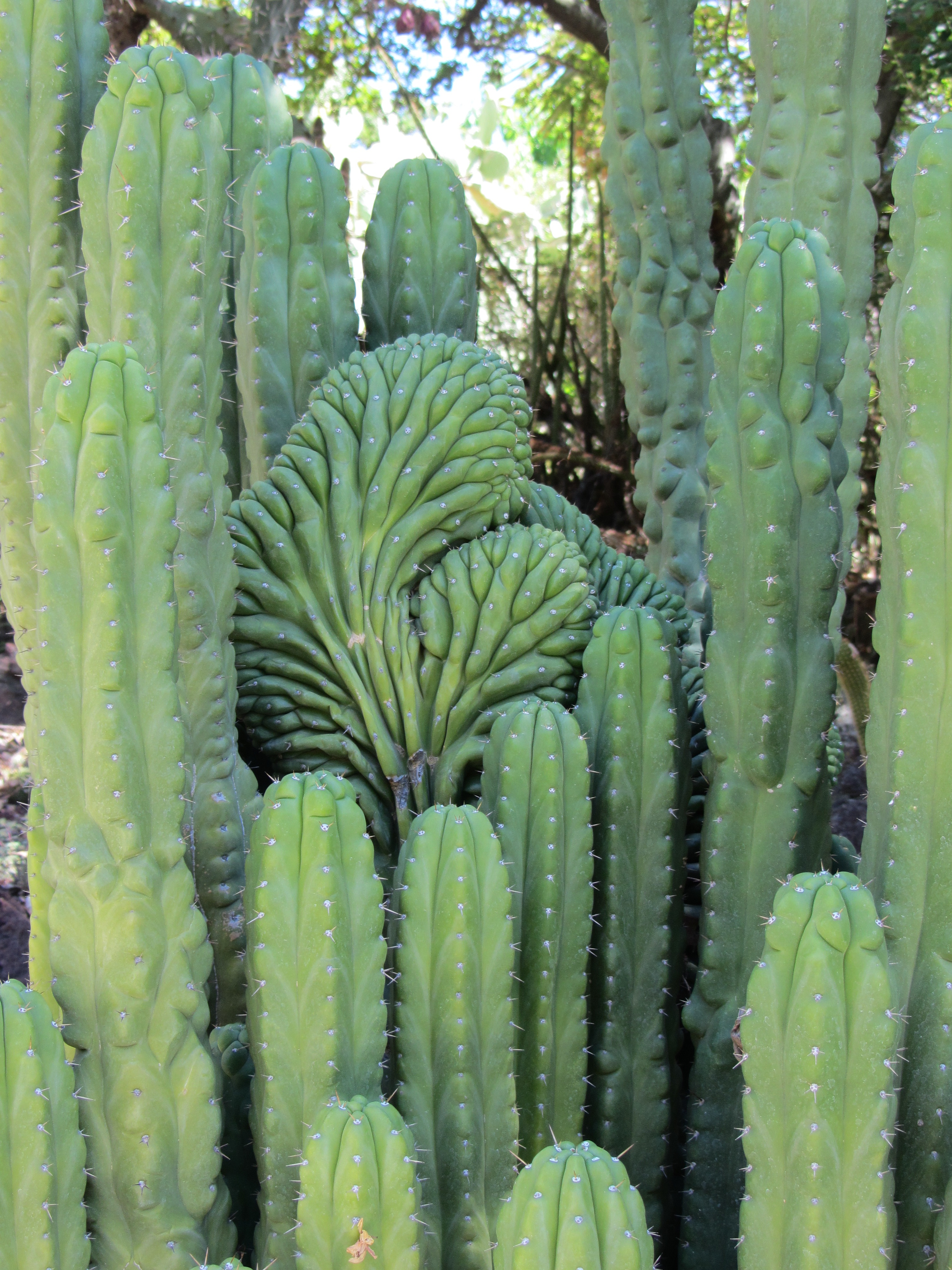
Trichocereus pachanoi with crested growth

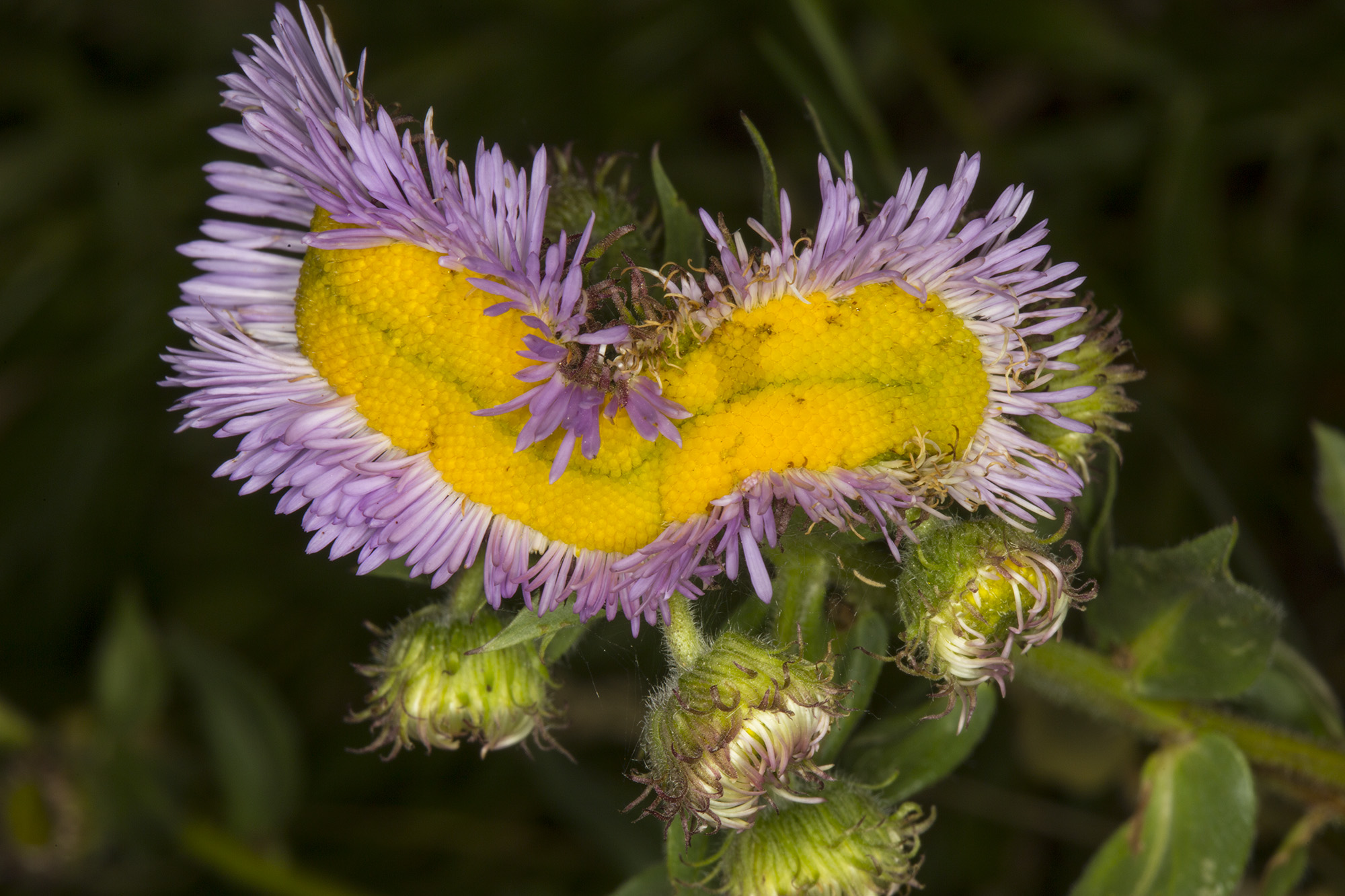
Fasciated showy daisy (Erigeron speciosus).

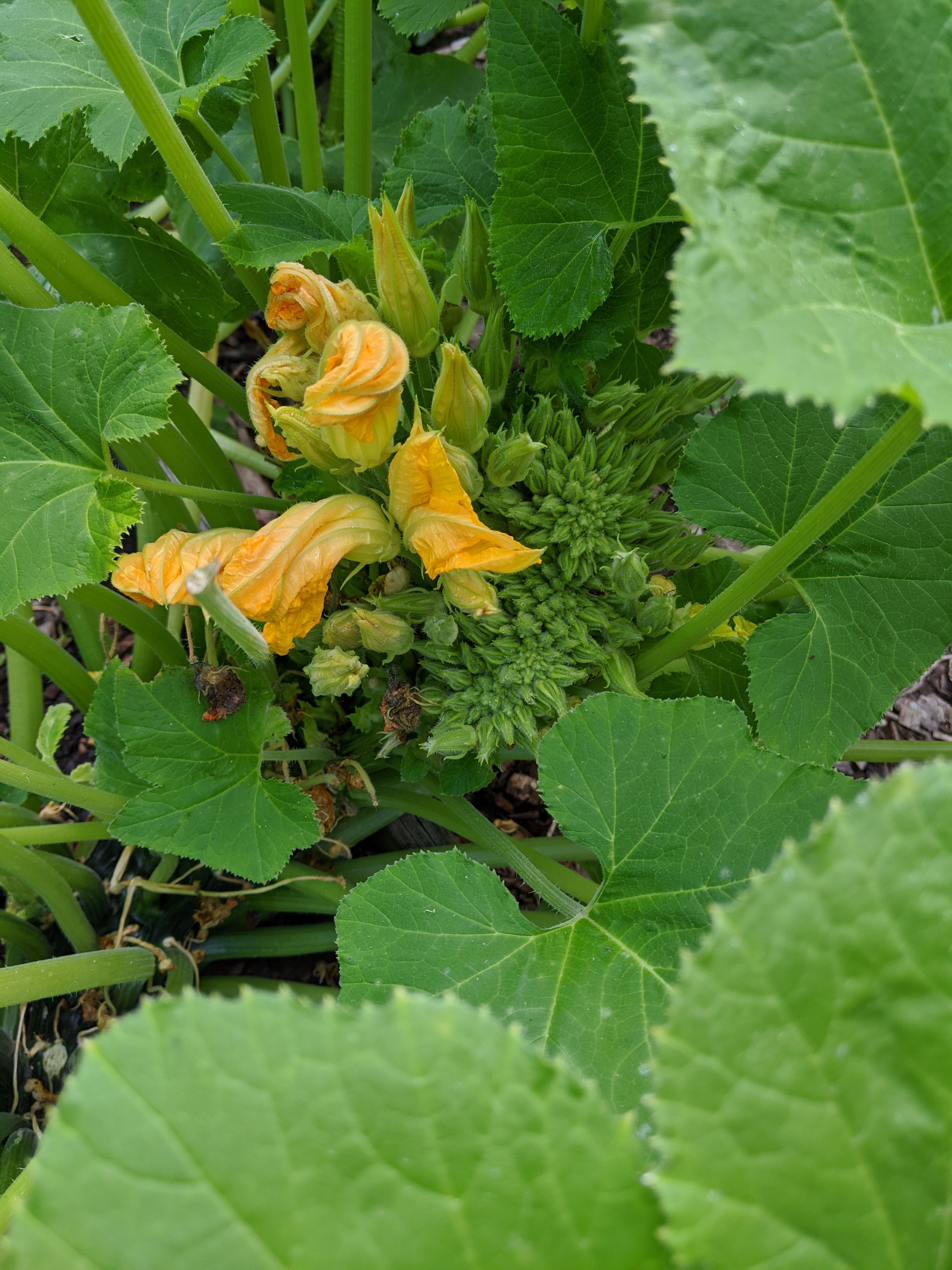
Fasciated Crookneck Squash

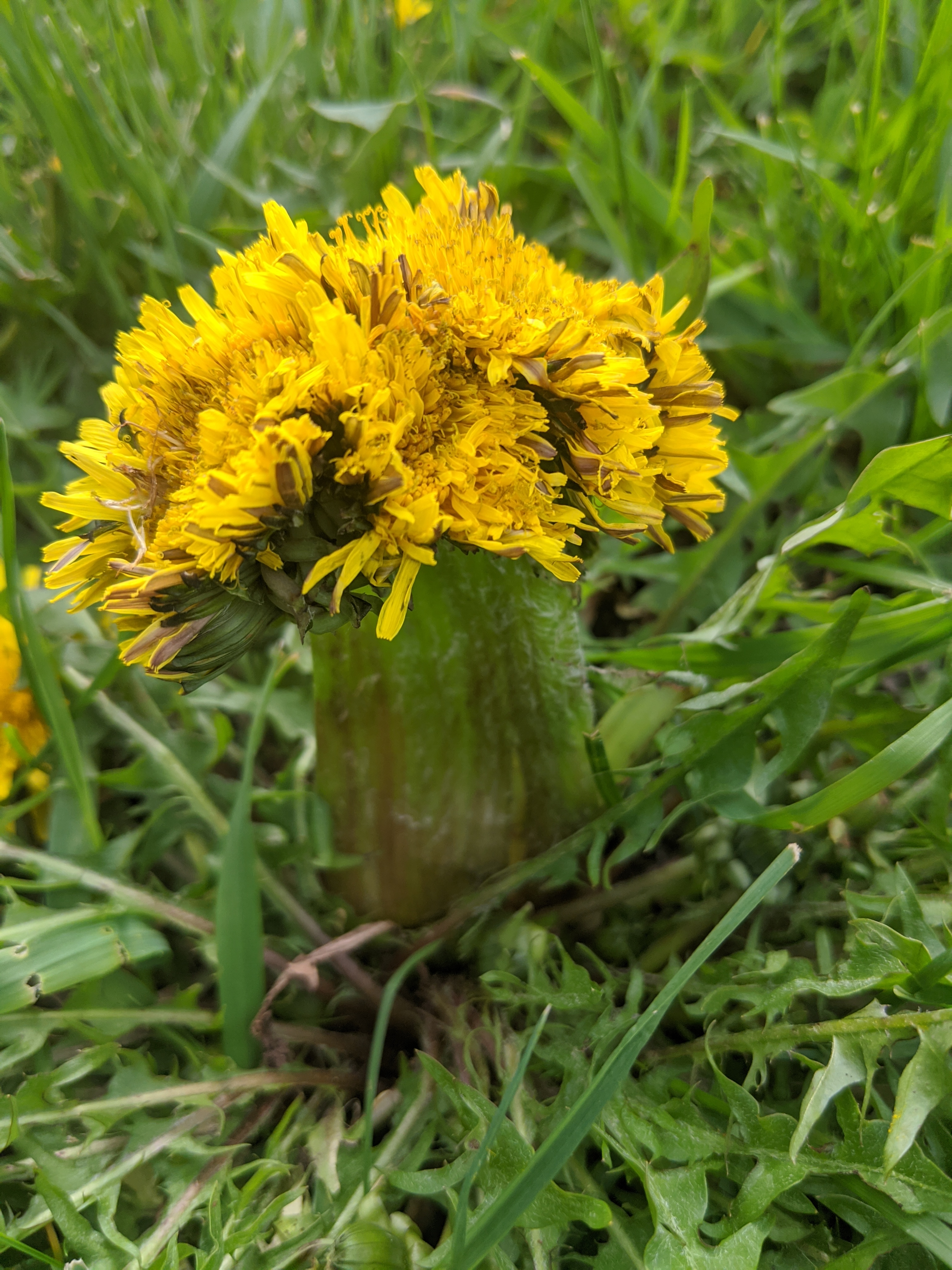
Fasciation seen on common dandelion

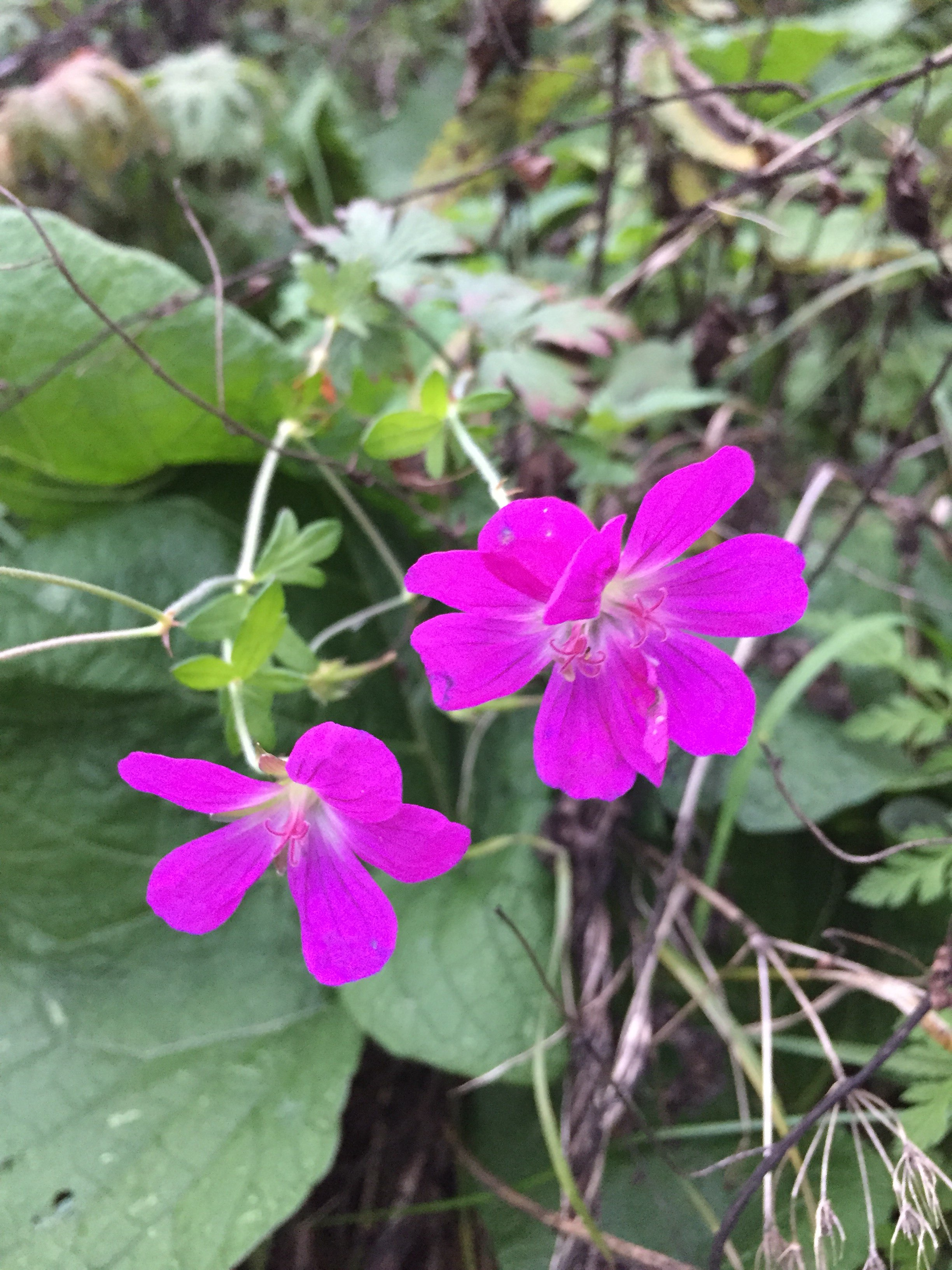
Regular (left) and fasciated (right) geranium flowers

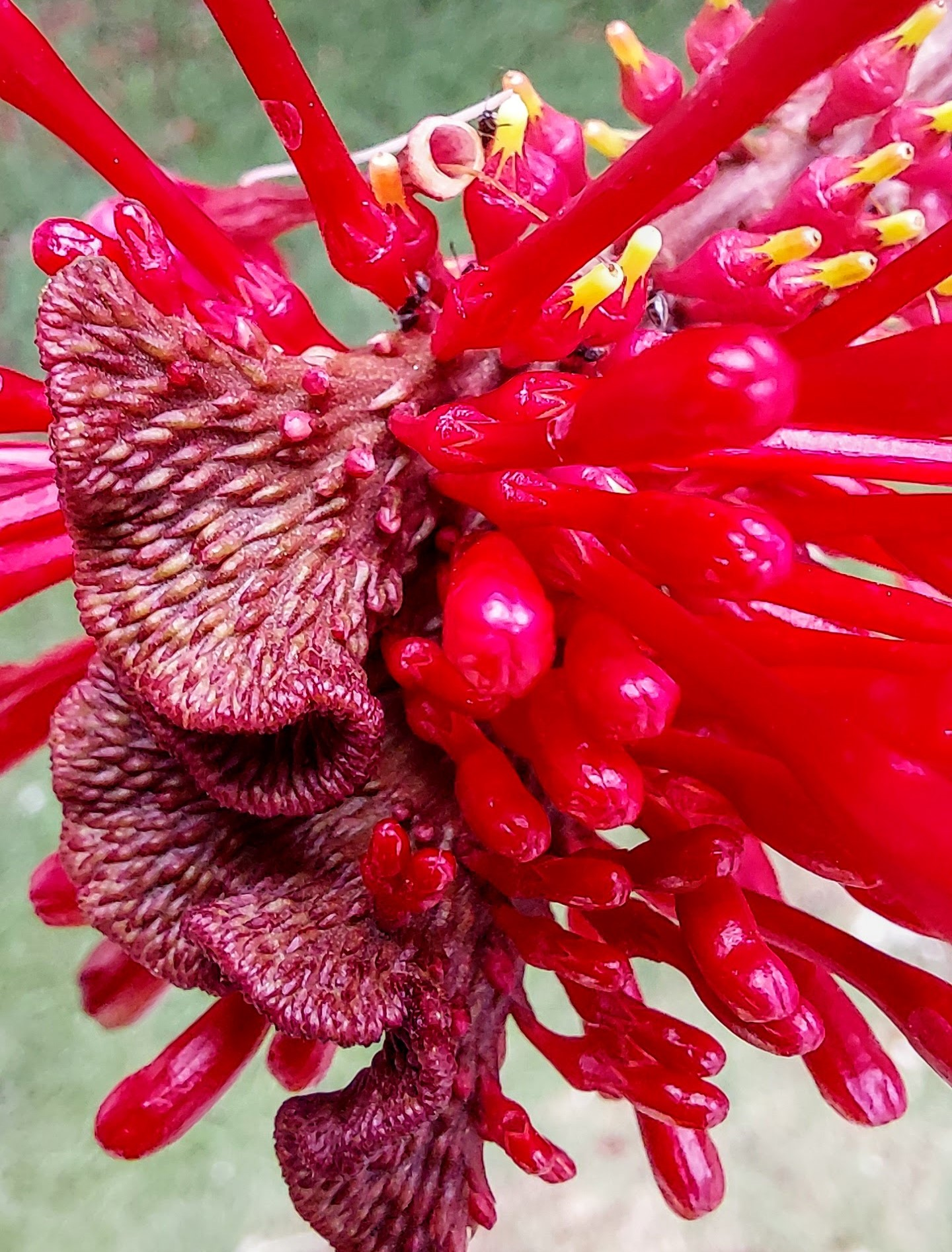
Fasciation in the inflorescence of a cultivated Odontonema tubaeforme plant.

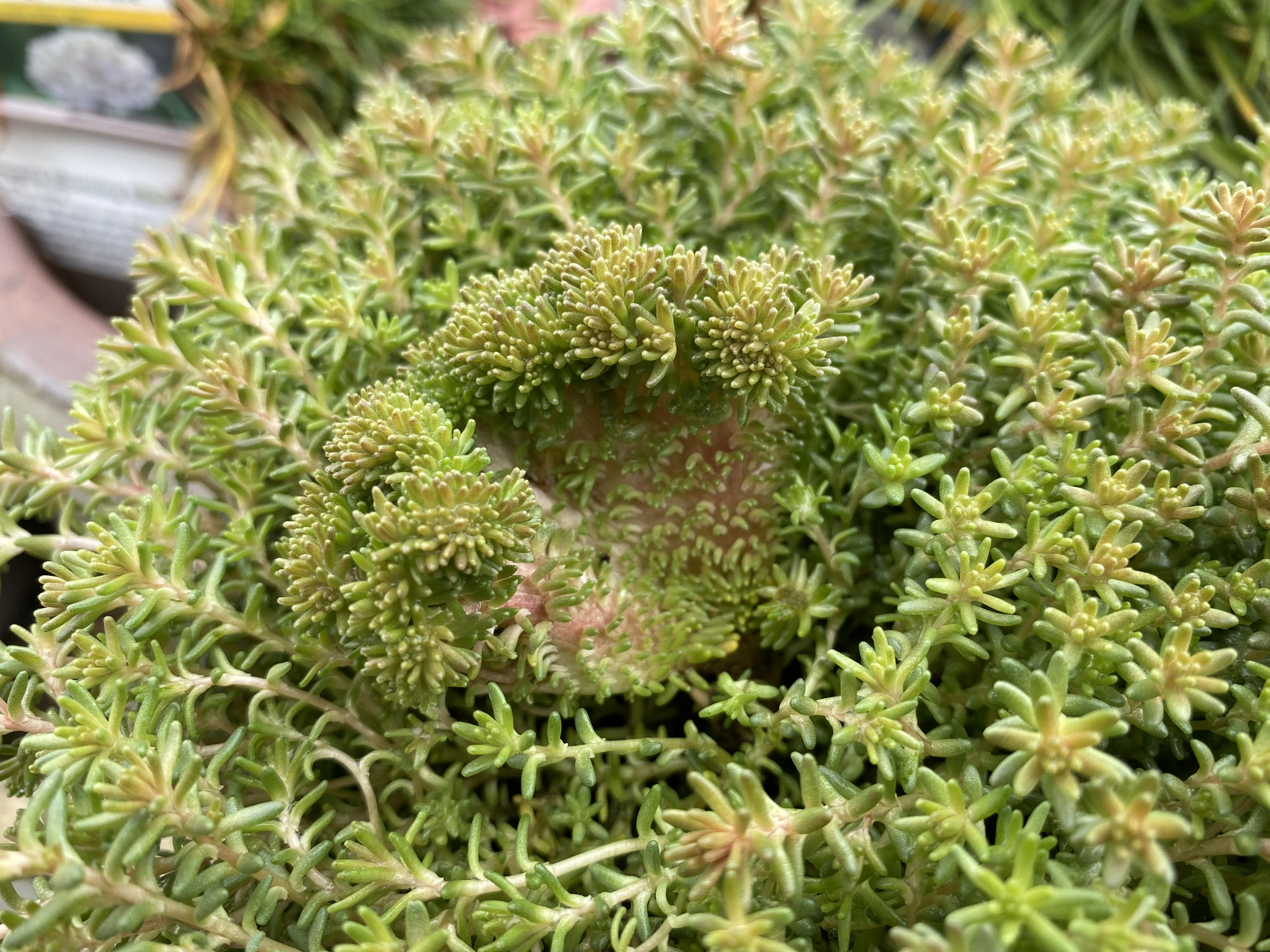
Fasciation exhibited on Sedum sexangulare.

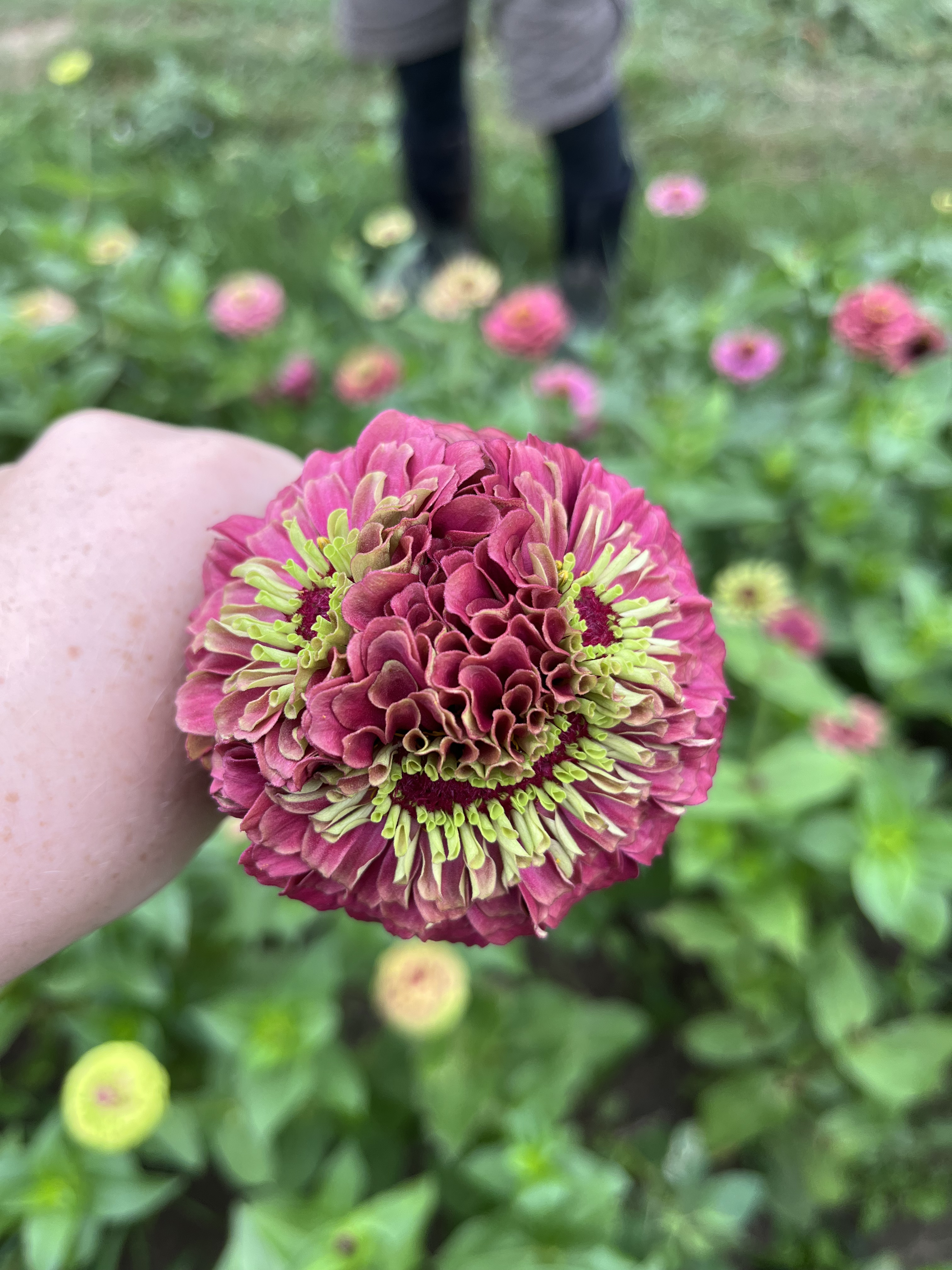
Fasciation on a zinnia that resembles a smiley face

== See also ==
- Adventitiousness
- Pelorism
- Phyllody
- Witch's broom
