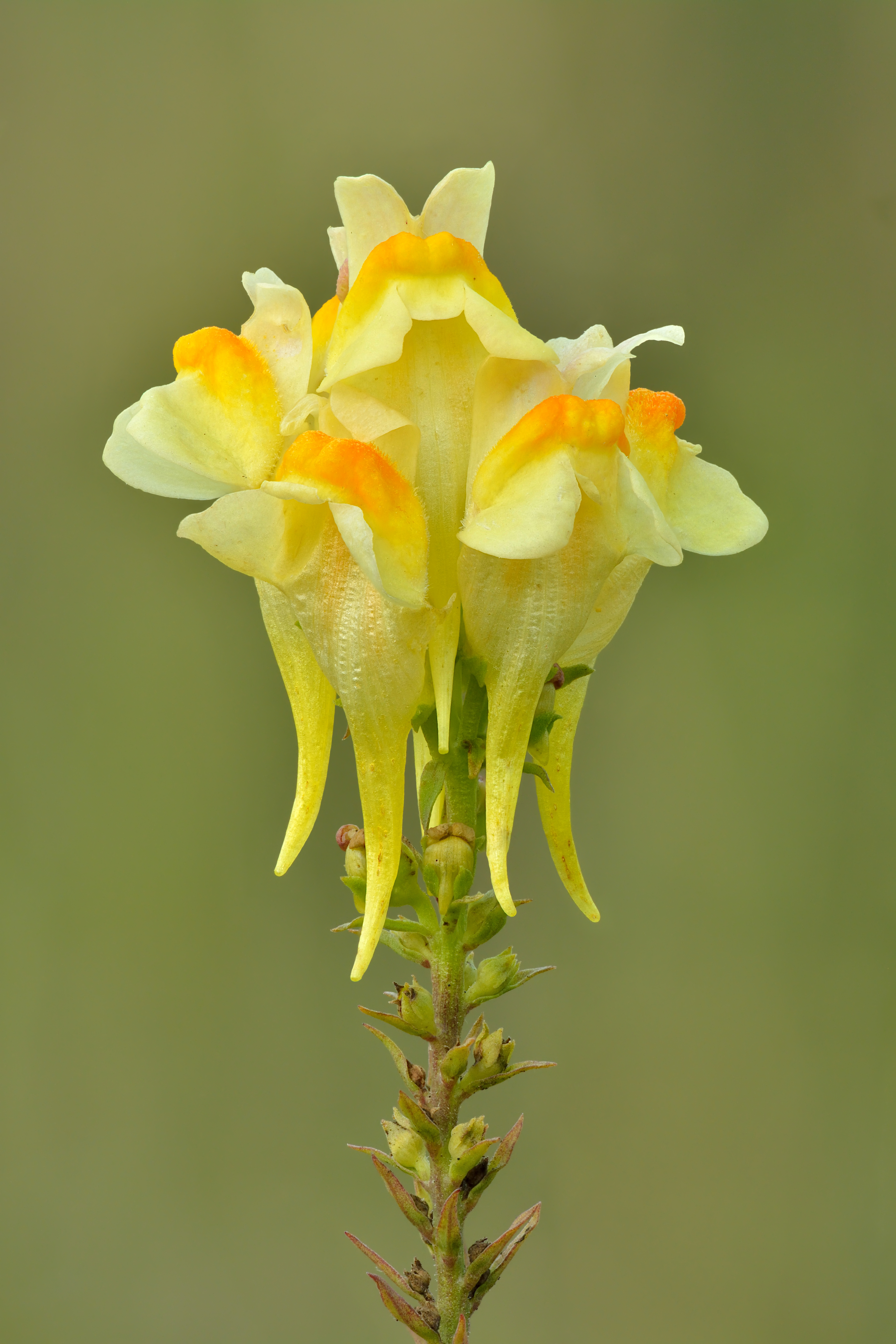
- Linaria vulgaris flowers
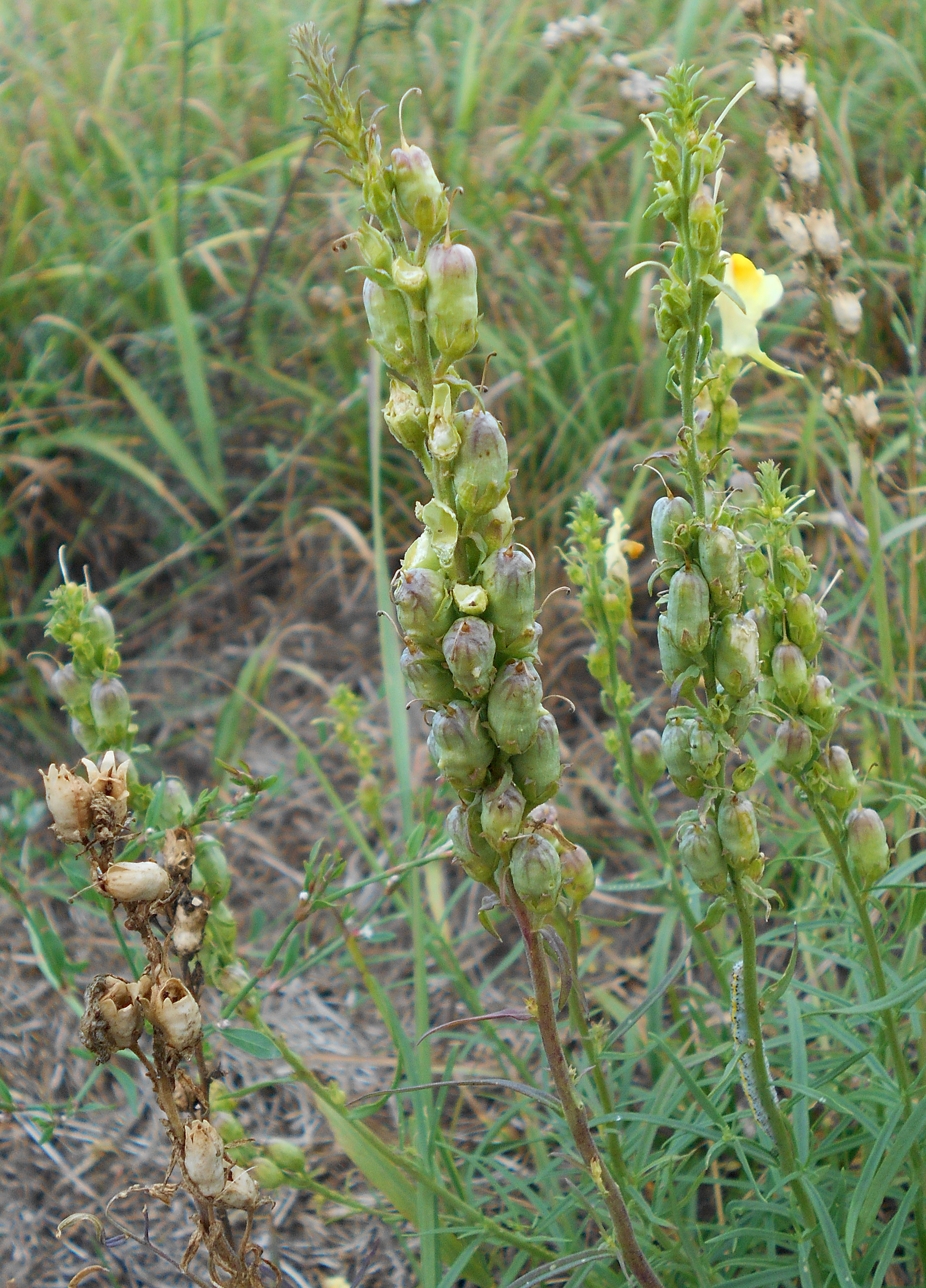
- Linaria vulgaris

Scientific classification
- Kingdom: Plantae
- Clade: Embryophytes
- Clade: Tracheophytes
- Clade: Spermatophytes
- Clade: Angiosperms
- Clade: Eudicots
- Clade: Asterids
- Order: Lamiales
- Family: Plantaginaceae
- Genus: Linaria
- Species: L. vulgaris

Binomial name
- Linaria vulgaris Mill.

= Linaria vulgaris =

Species of plant

Linaria vulgaris, the common toadflax, is a species of flowering plant in the family Plantaginaceae, native to Europe, and northern, central and eastern Asia. It has also been introduced to North America and is now common there.

== Taxonomy ==
Three subspecies are accepted by the Plants of the World Online database:

- Linaria vulgaris subsp. vulgaris — Europe, northern Asia
- Linaria vulgaris subsp. chinensis (Bunge ex Debeaux) D.Y.Hong — eastern Asia (China, Korea)
- Linaria vulgaris subsp. pinetorum Kosachev — Altai Mountains of central Asia

The closely related Linaria acutiloba Fisch. from central and northeastern Asia, is treated by the Flora of China as an additional subspecies, Linaria vulgaris subsp. acutiloba (Fisch.) D.Y.Hong.

== Description ==
It is a perennial plant with short spreading roots, erect to decumbent stems 15–90 cm (6–35 in) high, with fine, threadlike, glaucous blue-green leaves 2–8 cm (3/4–3 1/4 in) long and 1–5 mm (0.04–0.20 in) broad. The flowers are similar to those of the snapdragon but smaller and slenderer, 25–33 mm (0.98–1.30 in) long, pale yellow except for an area of the lower tip which is variably orange-yellow toned, borne in dense terminal racemes from mid summer to mid autumn (June to October in Britain). The flowers are mostly visited by bumblebees. Rarely, symmetrical five-spurred peloric flowers can be found. The fruit is an oblong to globose capsule 5–11 mm (0.20–0.43 in) long and 5–7 mm (0.20–0.28 in) broad, containing numerous small seeds.

== Ecology ==
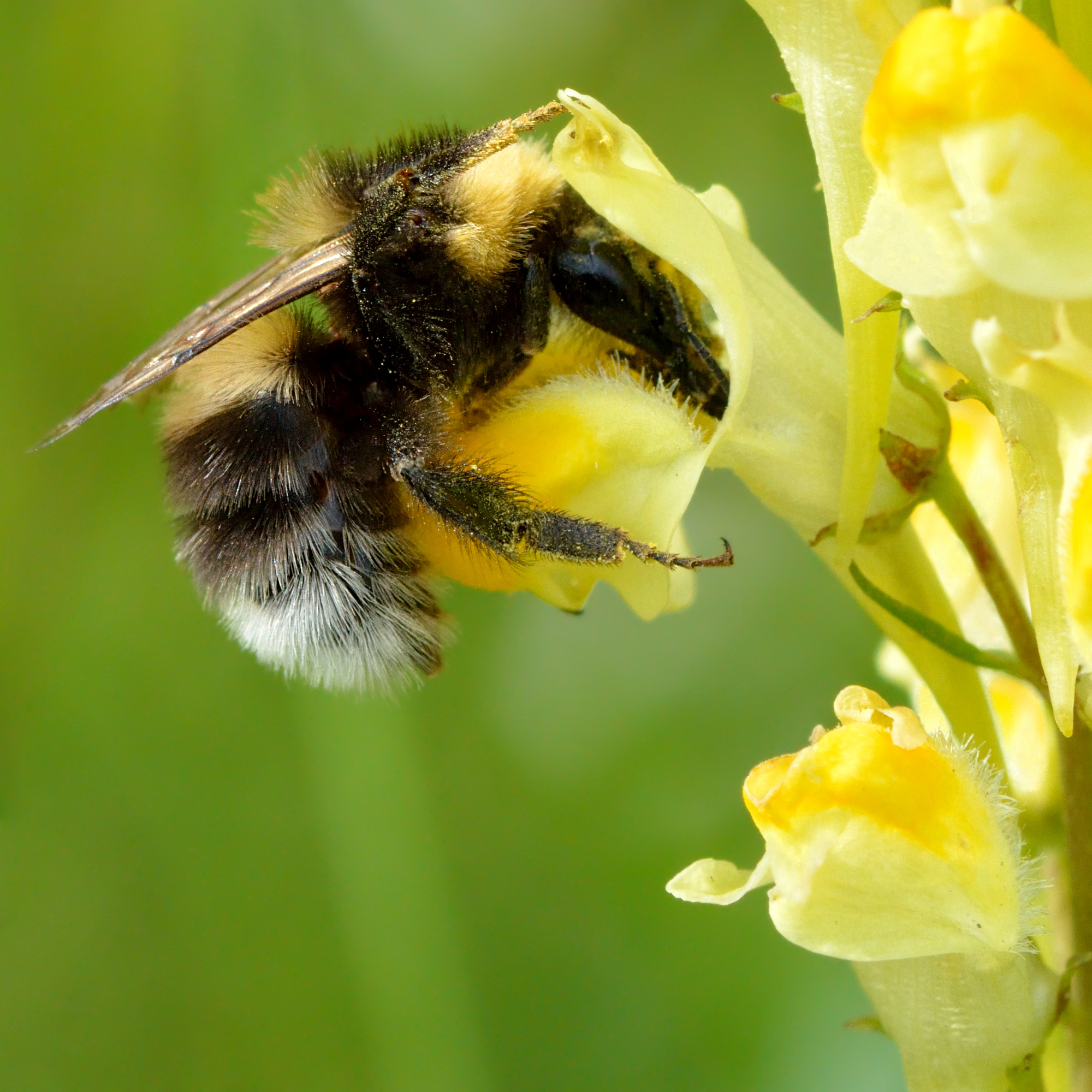
Pollination by garden bumblebee

The plant is widespread on ruderal spots, along roads, in dunes, and on disturbed and cultivated land.

Because the flower is largely closed by its underlip, pollination requires strong insects such as bees and bumblebees (Bombus species).

Linaria vulgaris is a food plant for a large number of insects such as the sweet gale moth (Acronicta euphorbiae), mouse moth (Amphipyra tragopoginis), silver Y (Autographa gamma), Calophasia lunula, gorgone checkerspot (Charidryas gorgone carlota), toadflax pug (Eupithecia linariata), satyr pug (Eupithecia satyrata), Falseuncaria ruficiliana, bog fritillary (Boloria eunomia), Pyrrhia umbra, brown rustic (Rusina ferruginea), and Stenoptilia bipunctidactyla.

The plant may be mildly toxic to livestock, but has also been used to treat cattle with rumination problems.

== Fossil record ==
Seeds of the common toadflax were identified from the Hoxnian interglacial strata at Clacton. Records have also come from the Weichselian glaciation strata in Essex, Huntingdonshire, Surrey and North Wales. This evidence makes the native status of the plant in Britain quite evident despite the very strong association that it has today with waste places and man-made habitats.

== Cultivation and uses ==
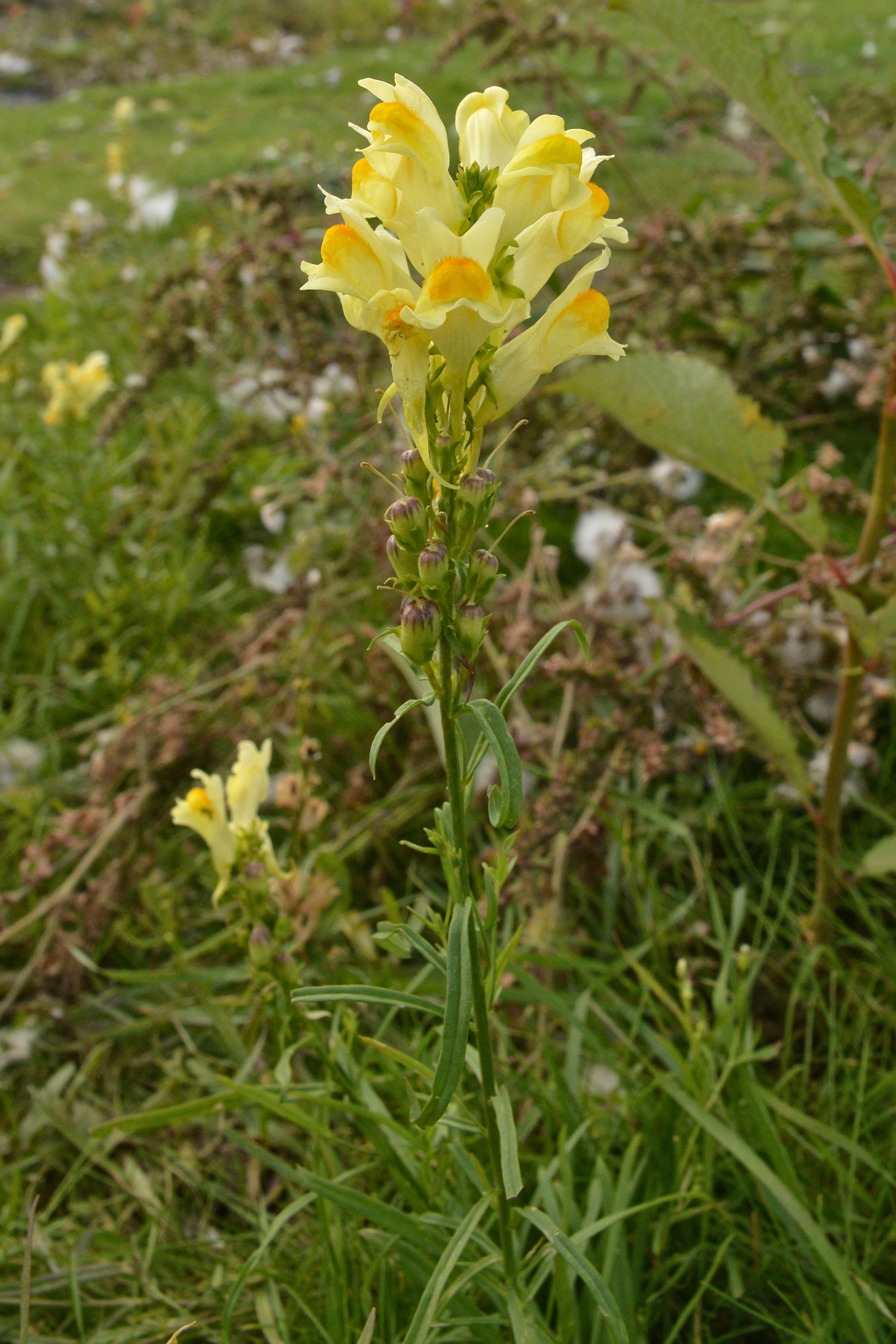
Linaria vulgaris subsp. vulgaris in Oslo, Norway

While most commonly found as a wildflower, toadflax is sometimes cultivated for cut flowers, which are long-lasting in a vase. Like the related snapdragons (Antirrhinum), they are often grown in children's gardens for the "snapping" flowers which can be made to "talk" by squeezing them at the base of the corolla.

The plant requires ample drainage, but is otherwise adaptable to a variety of conditions. It has escaped from cultivation in North America where it is now naturalised in many U.S. states and Canadian provinces, common on roadsides and in poor soils.

=== Traditional medicine ===
Despite its reputation as a weed, this plant has been used in folk medicine for a variety of ailments. A tea made from the leaves was taken as a laxative and strong diuretic as well as for jaundice, dropsy, and enteritis with drowsiness. For skin diseases and piles, either a leaf tea or an ointment made from the flowers was used. In addition, a tea made in milk instead of water has been used as an insecticide. Some evidence may support its diuretic and fever-reducing properties.

The species has a long history of use in traditional medicine; information is available in Barker (2001).

== Other names ==
Linaria acutiloba Fisch. ex Rchb. is a synonym.

Because this plant grows as a weed, it has acquired a large number of local colloquial names, including brideweed, bridewort, butter and eggs (but see Lotus corniculatus), butter haycocks, bread and butter, bunny haycocks, bunny mouths, calf's snout, Continental weed, dead men's bones, devil's flax, devil's flower, doggies, dragon bushes, eggs and bacon (but see Lotus corniculatus), eggs and butter, false flax, flaxweed, fluellen (but see Kickxia), gallweed, gallwort, impudent lawyer, Jacob's ladder (but see Polemonium), lion's mouth, monkey flower (but see Mimulus), North American ramsted, rabbit flower, rancid, ransted, snapdragon (but see Antirrhinum), wild flax, wild snapdragon, wild tobacco (but see Nicotiana), yellow rod, and yellow toadflax.
