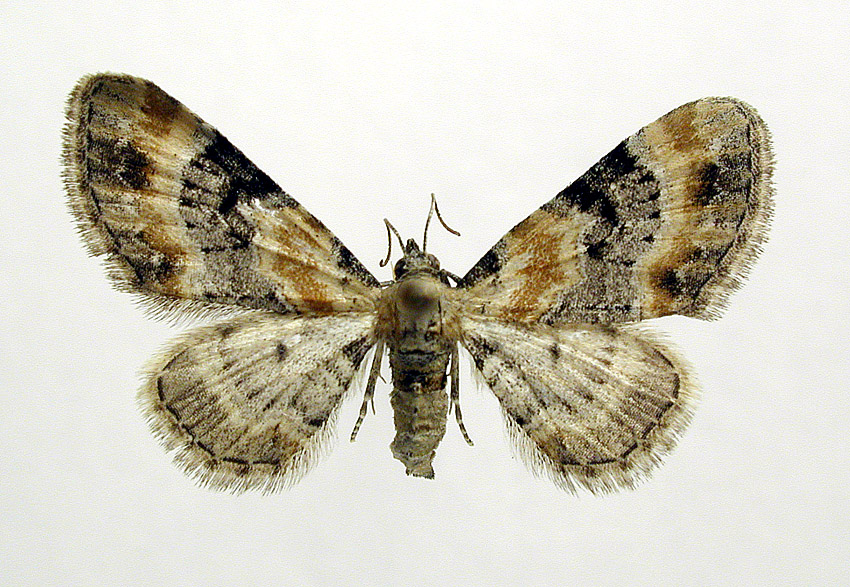

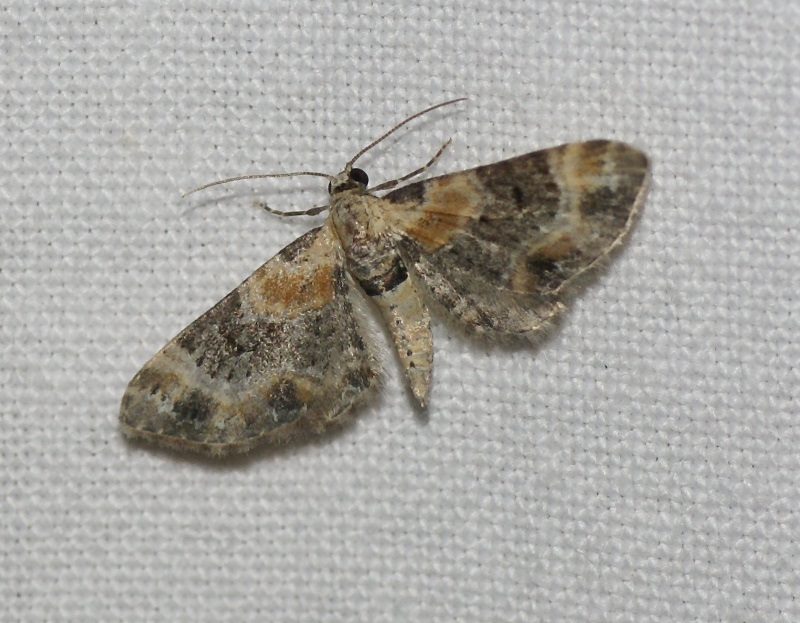

Scientific classification
- Kingdom: Animalia
- Phylum: Arthropoda
- Clade: Pancrustacea
- Class: Insecta
- Order: Lepidoptera
- Family: Geometridae
- Genus: Eupithecia
- Species: E. linariata

Binomial name
- Eupithecia linariata (Denis & Schiffermüller, 1775)

Synonyms
- Geometra linariata Denis & Schiffermuller, 1775

= Eupithecia linariata =

Species of moth

Eupithecia linariata, the toadflax pug, is a moth of the family Geometridae. The species can be found in Europe and from Anatolia to Tajikistan and Iran.

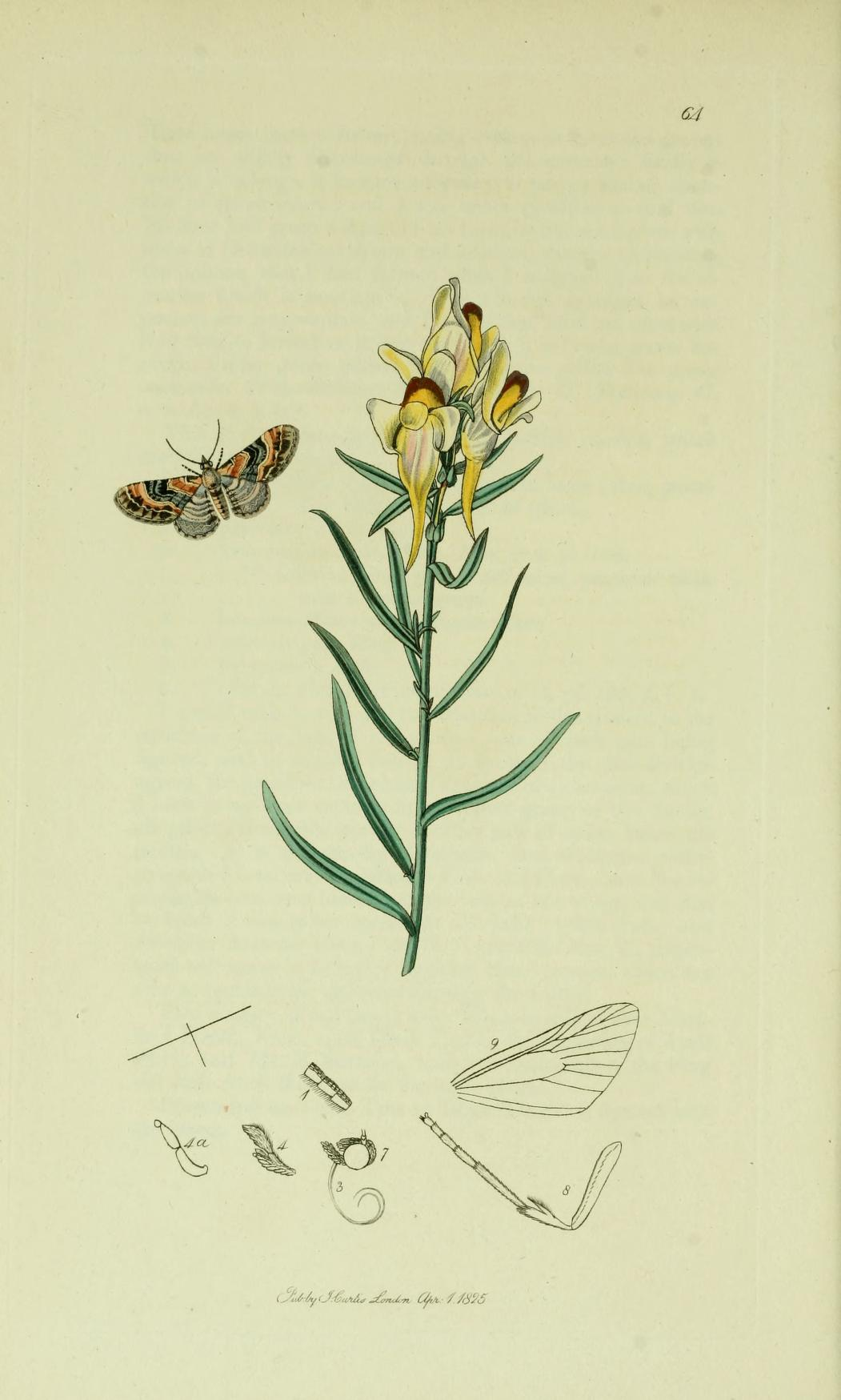
Illustration from John Curtis's British Entomology Volume 6

The wingspan is 11–16 mm. The moth flies from April to October depending on the location. There is one generation per year. It is very similar to the more common foxglove pug but flies earlier in the year, has a much darker (often almost black) abdomen band, a sharper angled outer edge to the dark forewing band, and is cleaner and often brighter looking in colouration.

The larvae feed on Linaria vulgaris and cultivated Antirrhinum species. Larvae are found from May to October. It overwinters in the pupal stage.
