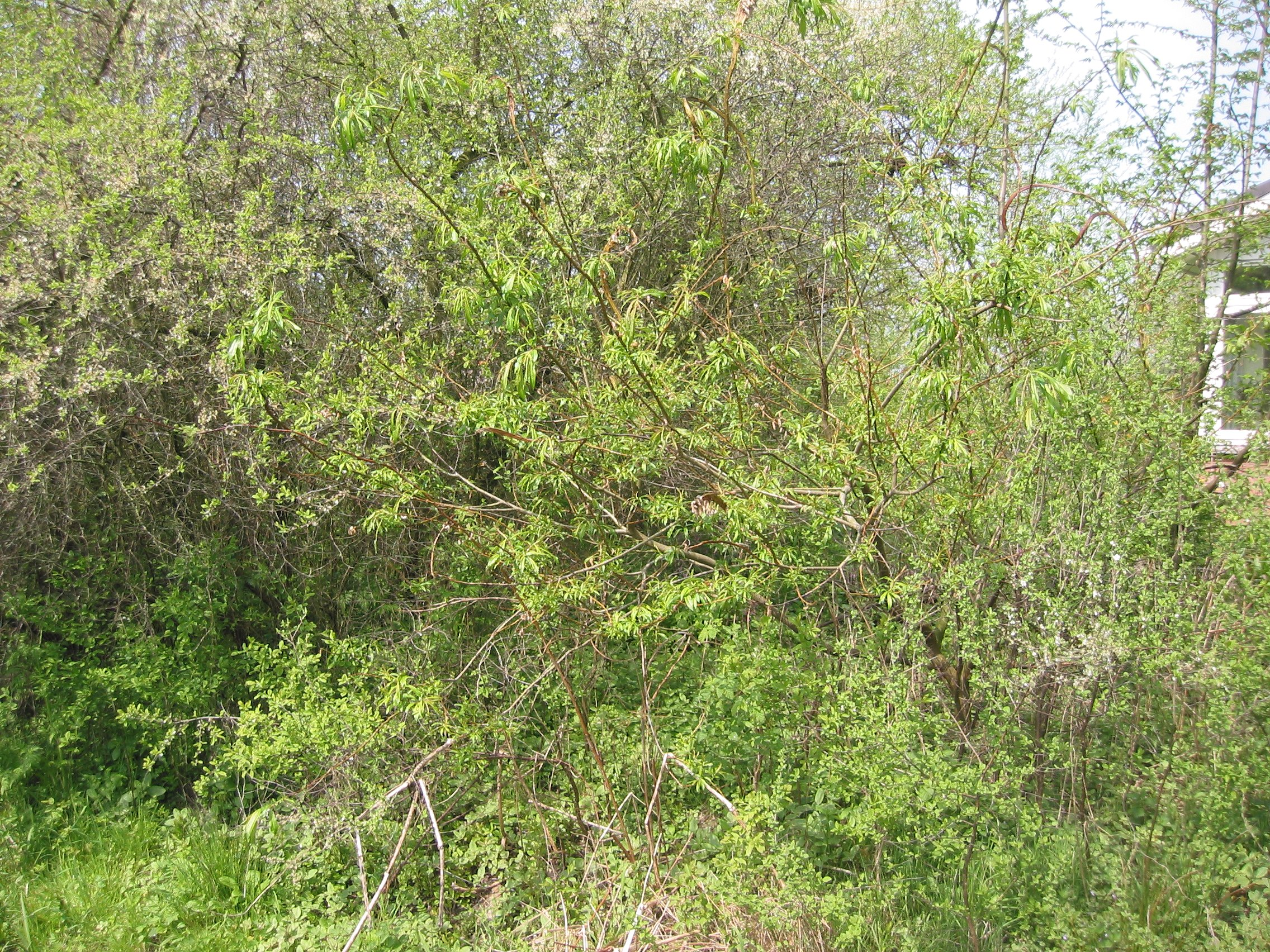
- Salix udensis 'Sekka'

Scientific classification
- Kingdom: Plantae
- Clade: Tracheophytes
- Clade: Angiosperms
- Clade: Eudicots
- Clade: Rosids
- Order: Malpighiales
- Family: Salicaceae
- Genus: Salix
- Species: S. udensis

Binomial name
- Salix udensis Trautv. & C.A.Mey.

= Salix udensis =

Species of willow

Salix udensis (syn. S. sachalinensis F.Schmidt) is a species of willow native to northeastern Asia, in eastern Siberia (including Kamchatka), northeastern China, and northern Japan. It is a deciduous shrub growing to 5 m (16 ft) tall. The leaves are slender, lanceolate, 6–10 cm long and 0.8–2 cm broad, glossy dark green above, glaucous and slightly hairy below, with a serrated margin. The flowers are produced in early spring on catkins 2–3 cm long. It typically takes 20 years to reach maturity.

The cultivar S. udensis 'Sekka' (Japanese fantail willow) is grown as an ornamental plant; it has fasciated stems (stems that are joined abnormally in a flattened arrangement—hence "fantail"), highly prized by Ikebana flower arrangers. The Sekka cultivar has also been found to be resistant to plant pathogens such as rust (Melampsora spp.) caused by pathogenic fungi.
