= Pelorism =

Mutation in flower species

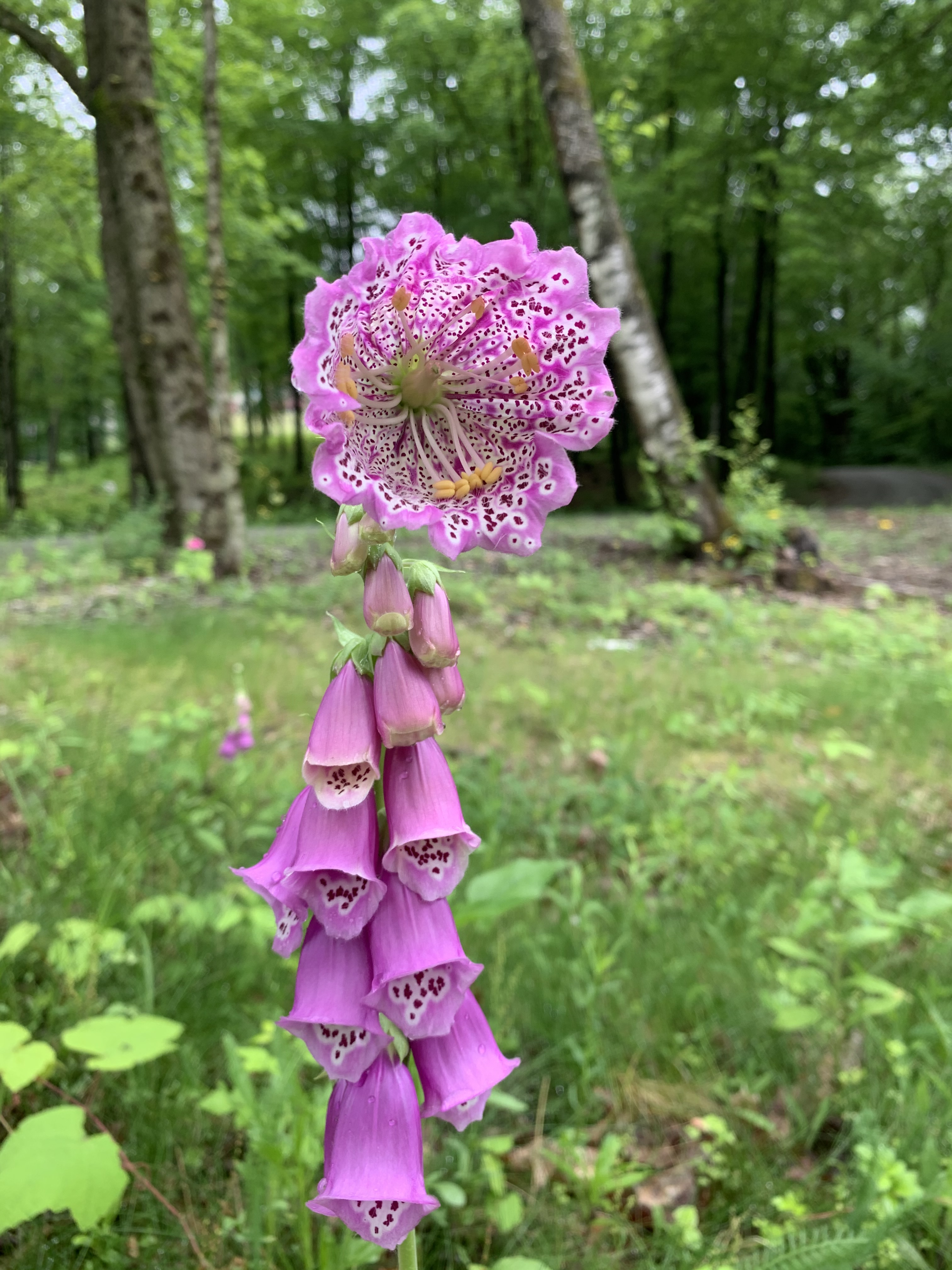
A foxglove with a peloric flower. (Digitalis purpurea 'monstrosa')

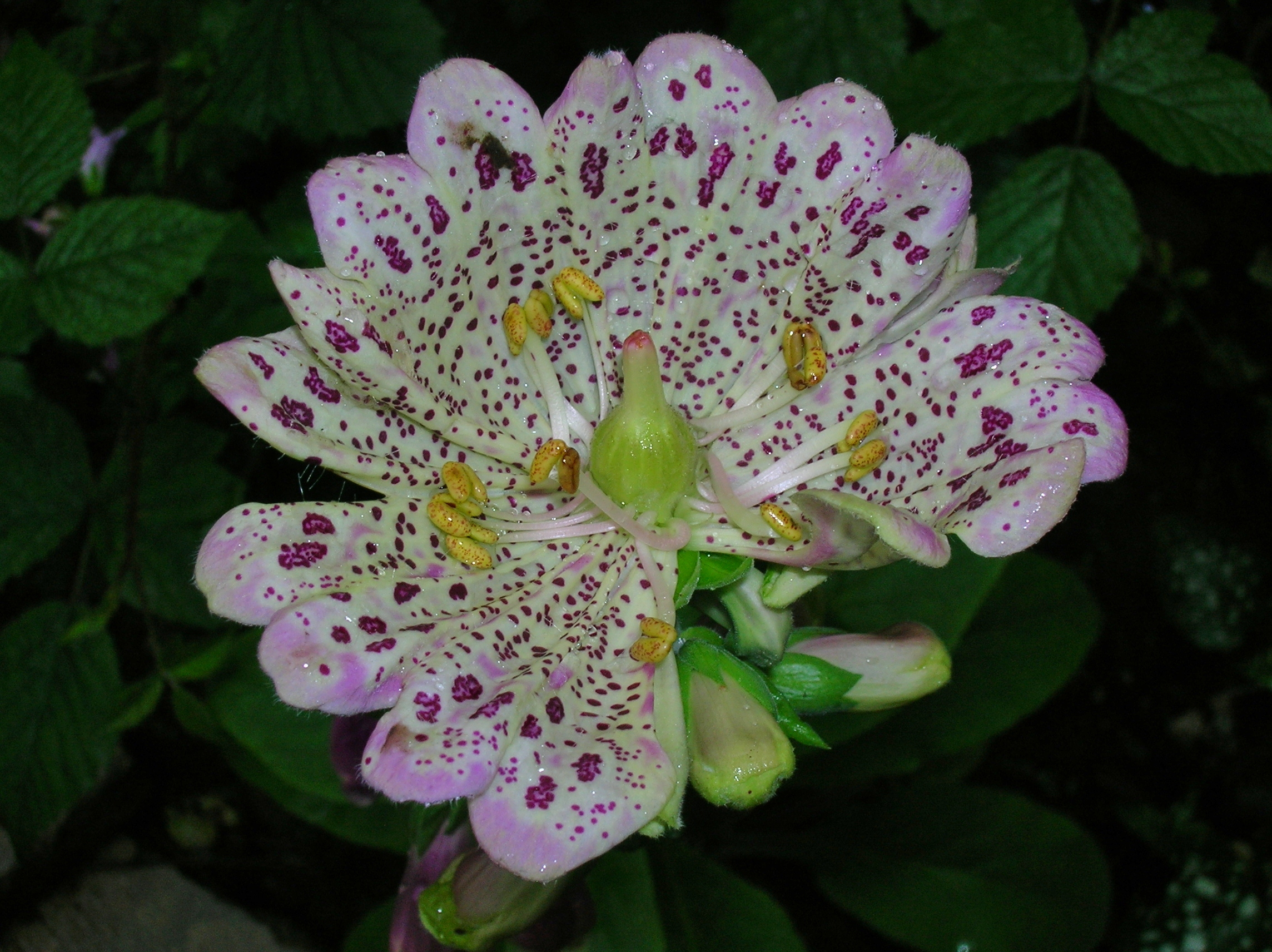
A peloric foxglove (Digitalis purpurea) flower

Pelorism is the abnormal production of radially symmetrical (actinomorphic) flowers in a species that usually produces bilaterally symmetrical (zygomorphic) flowers. These flowers are spontaneous floral symmetry mutants. The term epanody is also applied to this phenomenon. Bilaterally symmetrical (zygomorphic) flowers are known to have evolved several times from radially symmetrical (actinomorphic) flowers, these changes being linked to increasing specialisation in pollinators.

== History ==
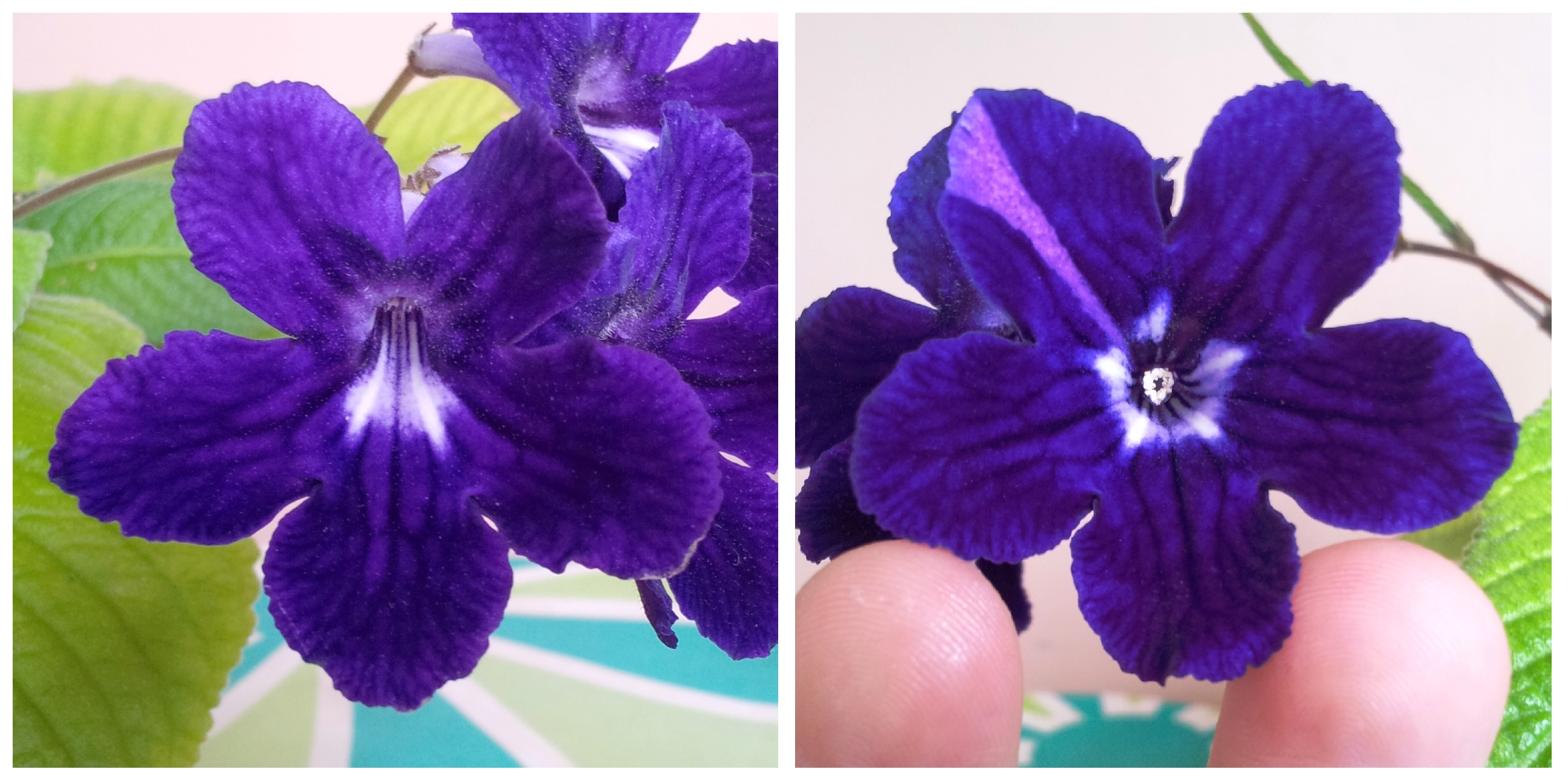
A normal (left) and a peloric Streptocarpus showing the bilateral to radial symmetry alteration.

Pelorism has been of interest since a five-spurred variant of the common toadflax Linaria vulgaris was first discovered in 1742 by a young Uppsala botanist on an island in the Stockholm archipelago and then in 1744 passed to and described by Carl Linnaeus. The mutant, spreading vegetatively, had five spurs rather than the usual one; however, the rest of the plant was normal. Linnaeus found that this variety was contrary to his concept that genera and species had universally arisen through an act of "original creation and remained unchanged since then". Linnaeus called this type of mutant a 'Peloria', the Greek for 'monster' or 'prodigy', because of the huge implications for the then current belief that species were immutable. He wrote that "This is certainly no less remarkable than if a cow were to give birth to a calf with a wolf's head". The peloric plant fascinated Linnaeus to the extent that he grew it at his summer residence in Hammarby and his explanation for it was that a toad-flax had been pollinated by another species. Charles Darwin, Charles Victor Naudin, Johann Wolfgang von Goethe and Hugo de Vries amongst others analysed and wrote about this significant mutation.

The botanist Thomas Fairchild corresponded with Linnaeus. Fairchild produced an artificial hybrid, Dianthus caryophyllus × D. barbatus in 1717 that became known as 'Fairchild's Mule', a cross between a sweet william and a carnation. The production of hybrids further undermined the belief that species as created by God were immutable.

== Appearance and causation ==
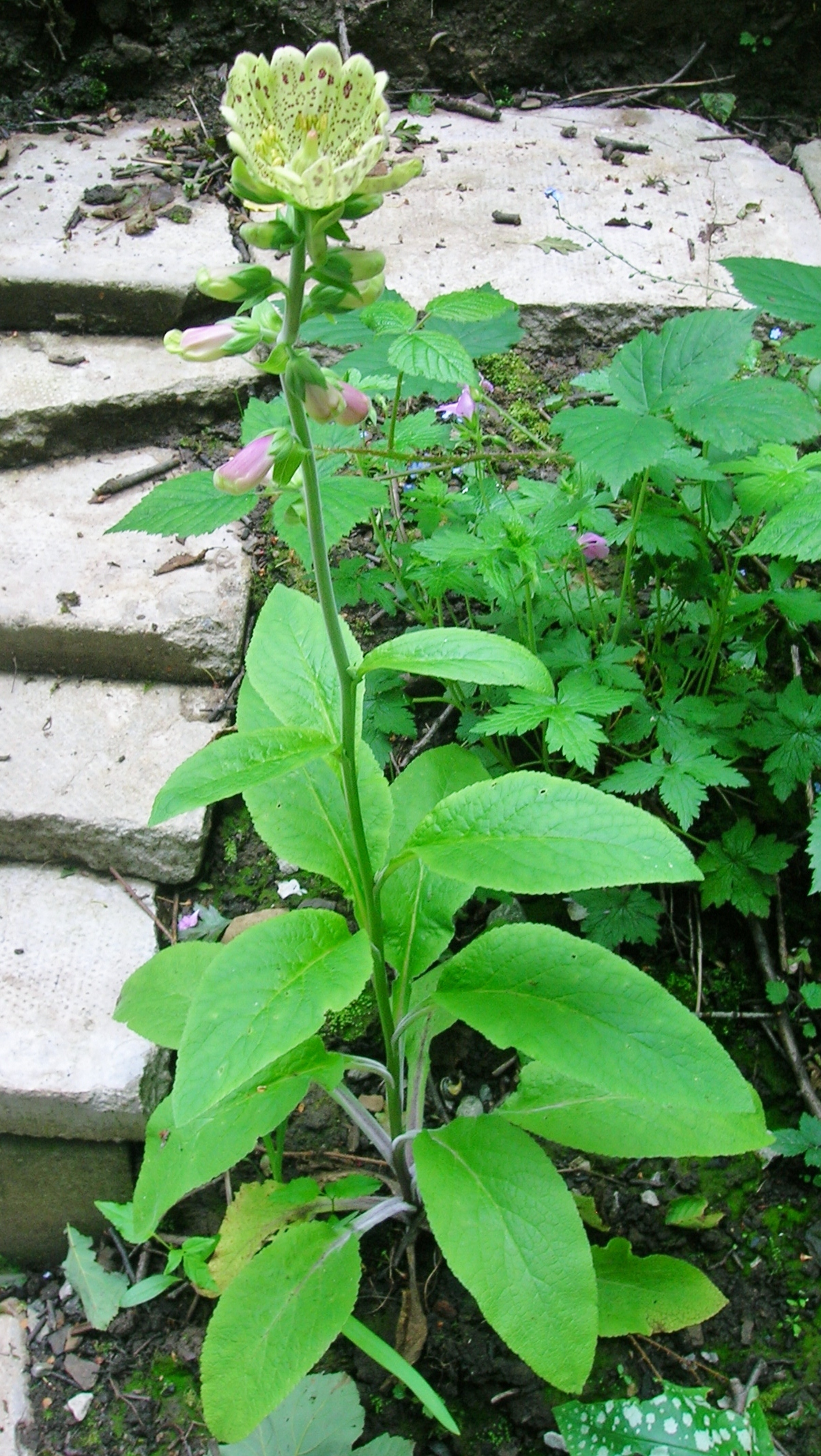
A foxglove showing a peloric flower at the apex and normal zygomorphic flowers below

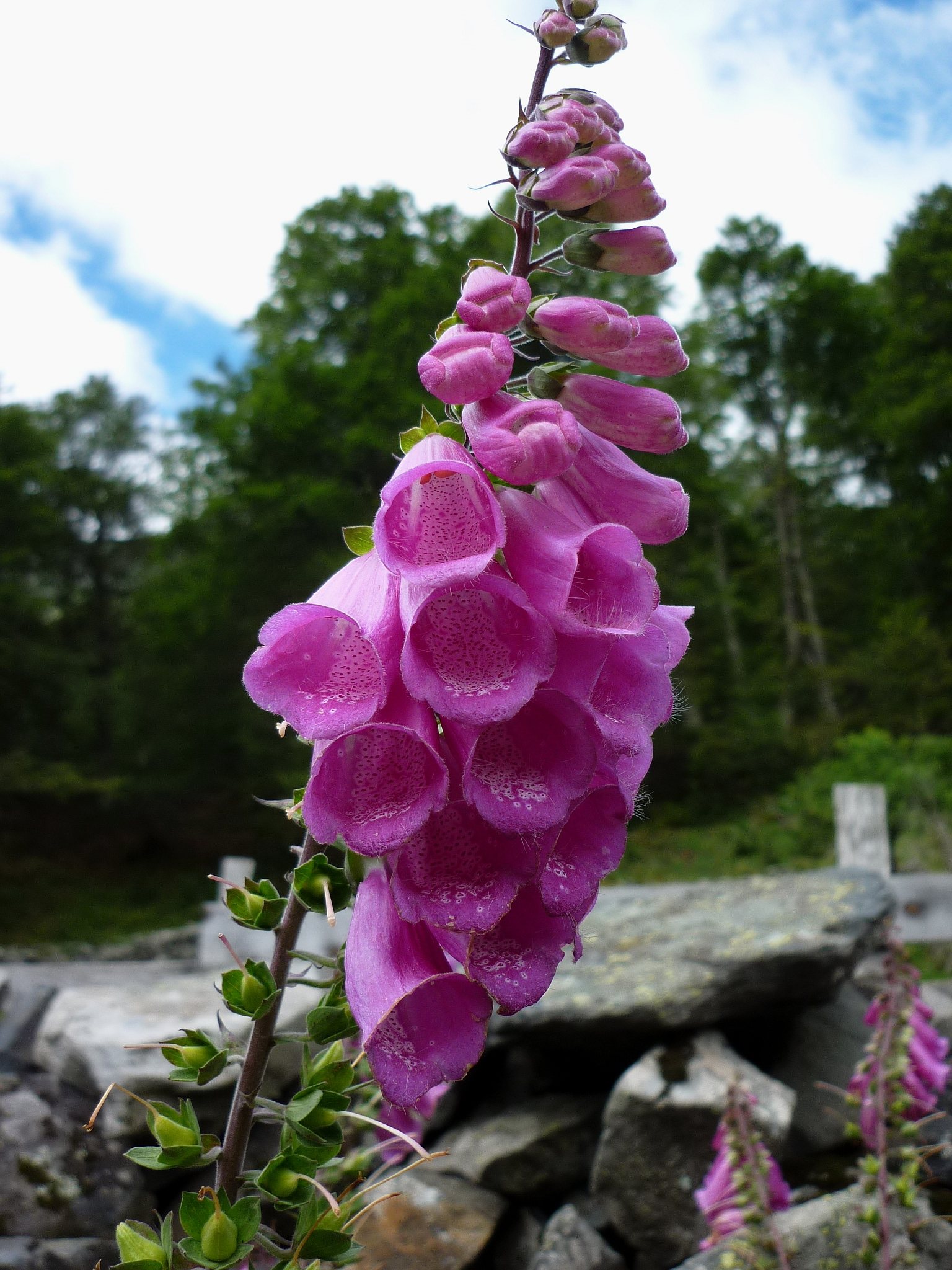
A normal foxglove plant

It is notable in foxgloves that the terminal flower more frequently develops peloric features than lateral flowers and this has had been put down to terminal buds having a greater supply of sap. Charles Darwin took a particular interest in peloric flowers, growing and cross-pollinating antirrhinums himself, as he saw the phenomenon as suggestive of a partial reversion to a past or ancestral type. Peloric forms quite commonly appear as random mutations in several orchid species in nature and this is genetically controlled, although the expression can be influenced by both environmental changes and by stresses. The occurrence is unstable and the same plant may exhibit normally on the next flowering.

In more highly evolved flowers such as orchids the details of pelorism may appear more complex with characteristics such as the two lateral petals replaced by two additional labella, the labellum replaced by an additional lateral petals in semipeloria or pseudopeloria where the modified labellum is less distinctively altered, however it is still distinguishable from the lateral petals and this confers a degree of zygomorphy upon the petal whorl.

Although the production of peloric flowers has been shown to generally follow standard Mendelian inheritance, this is not fixed and had been linked to the inability of a plant to produce normal internodes, this failure resulting in the fusion of flower buds, giving actinomorphic flowers. Foxglove plants show the terminal peloric bud flowering first followed by the more normal buds flowering below, the reverse of the normal flowering pattern, the terminal flowers withering first. The CYCLOIDEA (CYC) gene controls floral symmetry and peloric antirrhinums have been artificially induced by this gene being knocking out.

== Etymology ==
Peloria derives from both new Latin and from the Greek word pelōros, meaning 'monstrous'.

== Examples ==
Pelorism is found in several orchid species, such as Phalaenopsis it is demonstrated by flowers with abnormal numbers of petals or lips as a genetic trait, the expression of which is environmentally influenced and may appear random. It is widely noted in the mint family and species such as Digitalis purpurea, gloxinia, Antirrhinum majus, Pelargonium, and auricula. Because peloric flowers are larger and arguably more attractive than normal flowers plants such as cultivars of the gloxinia (Sinningia speciosa) have been deliberately bred to have peloric flowers.

== See also ==
- Floral symmetry
