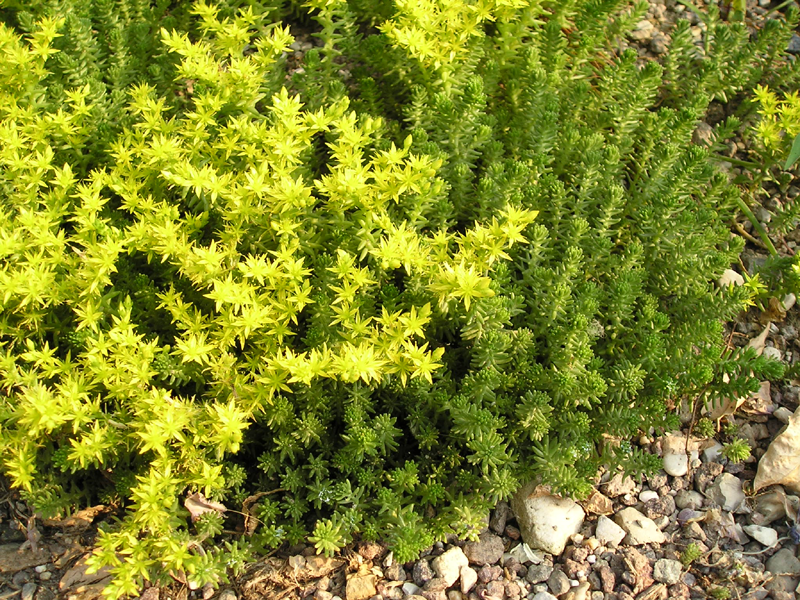

Scientific classification
- Kingdom: Plantae
- Clade: Tracheophytes
- Clade: Angiosperms
- Clade: Eudicots
- Order: Saxifragales
- Family: Crassulaceae
- Genus: Sedum
- Species: S. sexangulare

Binomial name
- Sedum sexangulare L.

= Sedum sexangulare =

Species of succulent

Sedum sexangulare, also known as tasteless stonecrop, is a species of succulent perennial and evergreen plant of the genus Sedum. It is similar to Sedum acre, but has shorter and denser leaves. It gained the binomial name ("six-angled") for its characteristic six spirals of leaves. S. sexangulare is about 15 cm (5 in) tall and is native to Europe and Asia, where it grows in the wild and is often cultivated as an ornamental plant. The plant needs wet or dry sandy soil and a sunny spot. It blooms in June and July with yellow, star-shaped flowers, which attract bees and other insects.
