= Cherry X Disease =

Plant disease

- Causal agents: Phytoplasma
- Hosts: Sweet/sour cherries
- Vectors: mountain leafhopper (Colladonus montanus)

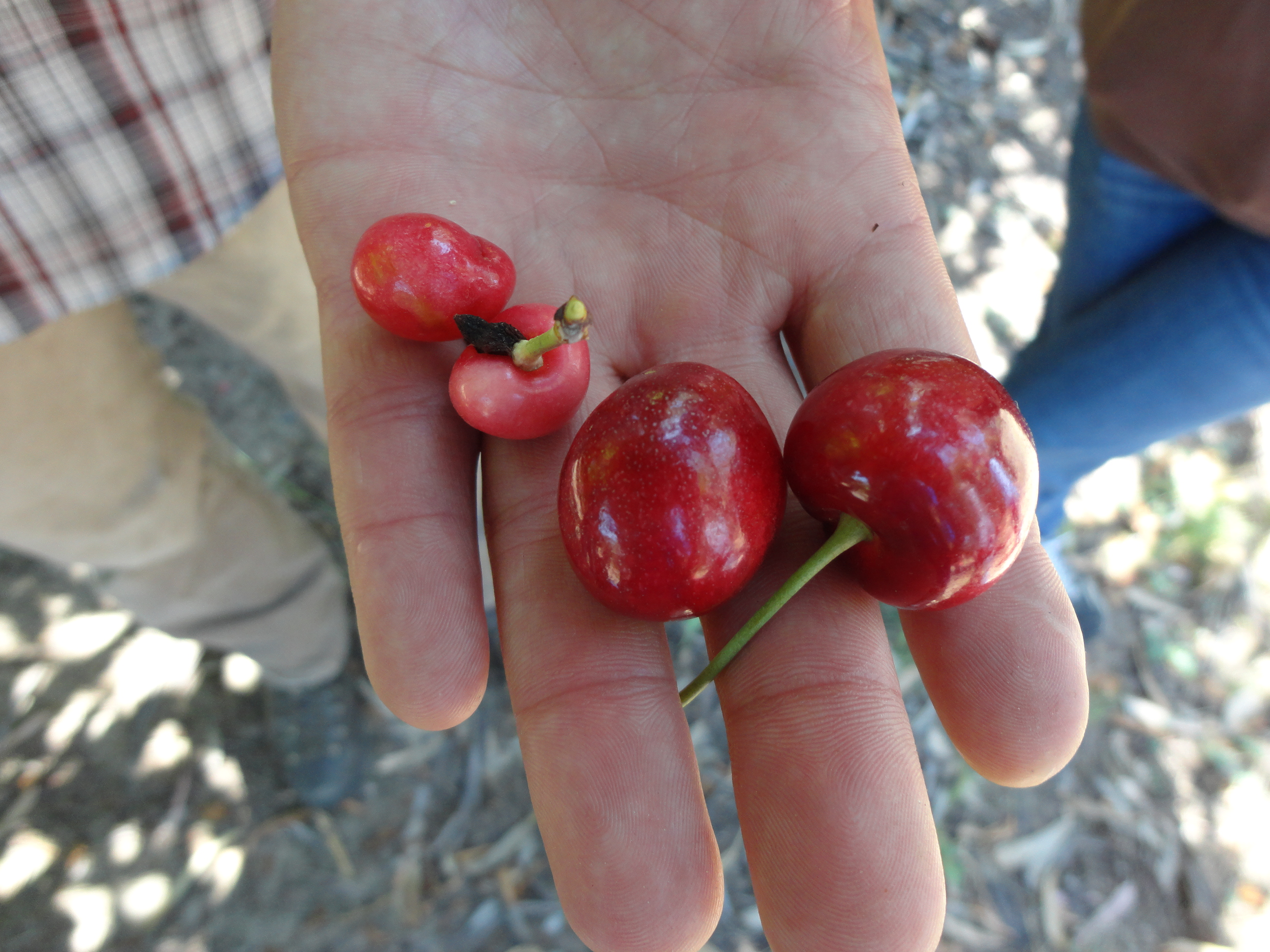
Cherry trees infected with X-disease yield smaller and paler fruit (upper left).

Cherry X disease also known as Cherry Buckskin disease is caused by a plant pathogenic phytoplasma. Phytoplasmas are obligate parasites of plants and insects. They are specialized bacteria, characterized by their lack of a cell wall, often transmitted through insects, and are responsible for large losses in crops, fruit trees, and ornamentals. The phytoplasma causing Cherry X disease has a fairly limited host range mostly of stone fruit trees. Hosts of the pathogen include sweet cherry, sour cherry, choke cherry, peaches, nectarines, almonds, clover, and dandelion. Most commonly the pathogen is introduced into economical fruit orchards from wild choke cherry and herbaceous weed hosts. The pathogen is vectored by mountain and cherry leafhoppers. The mountain leafhopper (Colladonus montanus) vectors the pathogen from wild hosts to cherry orchards but does not feed on the other hosts. The cherry leafhopper (Fieberiella florii) feeds on cherry trees and can transmit the disease from cherry orchards to peach, nectarine, and other economic crops. The Saddled Leafhopper (Colladonus clitellarius) is a vector of the disease in peaches. Control of Cherry X disease is limited to controlling the spread, vectors, and weed hosts of the pathogen. Once the pathogen has infected a tree it is fatal and removal is necessary to stop it from becoming a reservoir for vectors.

== Hosts ==
For Cherry X disease there are two types of hosts for the phytoplasma, reservoir and non-reservoir hosts. Reservoir hosts can survive for long periods while being infected with the disease. This allows them to be a constant food source for the leafhoppers which act to vector the phytoplasma from these hosts to other hosts in the area. Choke cherry is the most common reservoir host and a favorite food for the cherry leafhoppers. Other reservoir hosts include clovers and dandelions. Sweet/sour cherries, as well as almonds and Japanese plums are all fruit tree reservoir hosts for the Cherry X disease. All of these, once infected, can act as a source for the disease to be vectored from to other hosts. While non-cherry hosts can become infected they are not the preferred host of the phytoplasma. Because of the vectors preference for cherry trees, choke cherry which is a wild growing cherry species is the most common host of the disease. The range that Cherry X disease is distributed over is directly linked to the distribution of wild choke cherry populations.

Non-reservoir hosts are hosts that once infected do not allow for the disease to be spread. Peach and nectarine trees can be infected but they do not allow for the spread of the disease. This process which causes them to halt the spread of the pathogen is still not well understood. Peaches are commonly infected when near cherry orchards. Non-reservoir hosts are infected when cherry leafhoppers that are carrying the phytoplasma feed on non-reservoir hosts that are near a cherry orchard that has the pathogen.

== Symptoms ==
The symptoms of Cherry X disease vary greatly depending on the host. On cherry hosts symptoms can usually first be seen on the fruits, causing them to be smaller in size with a leathery skin. Pale fruit is common at harvest time. It is common for symptoms to first be seen in a single branch. The branch may lose its older leaves, and the leaves tend to be smaller with a bronzed complexion.

The rootstock that the cherry is grafted onto can play a significant role in the disease symptoms seen. Rootstocks of Mahaleb cherry exhibit different symptoms from stocks of Colt, Mazzard, or Stockton Morello. When the scion is grafted onto Mahaleb, symptoms consistent with Phytophthora root rot can be seen. To distinguish between root rot and x-disease the wood under the bark at the graft union should be examined. If it is x-disease the wood at the union will have grooves and pits this causes a browning of the phloem and shows the cells in decline. This rapid decline is caused by the rootstock cells near the graft union dying in large quantities. Foliage begins to turn yellow and the curl upward and inward toward the leaf midrib. Trees infected with Mahaleb rootstock die by late summer or early the following year.

When Cherries are grafted onto Colt, Mazzard, or Stockton Morello rootstocks, there is a different range of symptoms. Affected leaves are smaller than normal and the foliage may be sparse. Dieback of shoot tips is common as the disease progresses. Fruit on branches are smaller, lighter, pointed, low sugar content, poor flavor, and a bitter taste.

Peaches are the next most common economic fruit host of the X-disease. Symptoms can be seen after about two months single branches will begin to show symptoms of their individual leaves. These leaves curl up and inward with irregular yellow to reddish-purple spots. These spots can drop out leaving “shotholes”. Leaves that are affected by the disease will fall prematurely. After 2–3 years the entire tree will show symptoms.

== Disease cycle ==
The mountain leafhopper (Colladonus montanus) overwinters on winter annual weeds, particularly near streams and canals. Adults can be plentiful on sugarbeet during late winter/spring and migrate to favored weed hosts such as curly dock or burclovers in orchards. The Mountain leafhopper is most abundant vector found on cherry but does not reproduce on cherry. The mountain leafhopper (Colladonus montanus) spreads the disease from wild herbaceous hosts to woody hosts. It is believed that it is more responsible for the introduction of the disease into cherry trees, then in transferring them from cherry tree to cherry tree in an orchard. The cherry leafhopper (Fieberiella florii) reproduces on a broad range of woody hosts. The cherry leafhopper is more important in vectoring the disease from tree to tree within an orchard, since cherry is a favored host. After a leafhopper feeds on an infected host the pathogen has to undergo a latent period. During the latent period the pathogen spreads and multiplies inside the vector. Depending on temperature and the vector, the average latent period for the cherry x disease is about a month or longer. The phytoplasma is then transmitted from the leafhopper to the tree when the leafhopper is feeding on the trees phloem. It's then spread throughout the tree becoming systemic. July through October is when the highest concentrations of pathogen are present in leaves of infected trees.

== Importance ==
The disease is fatal and will always yield damaged fruit (choke cherries) as well as a dying/dead tree. If left unattended to, the leafhoppers can become life-time transmitters/vectors for the disease following about a 1-month latent period. The disease can take as quickly as 2–3 months to develop symptoms but more commonly 6–9 months, but the symptoms are usually first seen in the next growing season after the infection, with the rare exception that the infection and first symptoms occur both in the same spring season. In high cherry producing areas, such as California, Washington, and Oregon, this disease could be devastating if left unchecked. For instance in 2002, 57,000 tons of cherries were harvested from 24,000 acres in California. The year grossed a total of over $152 million. If, in 2002, this disease was allowed to incubate, the results would show a drastic decline of production and huge loss of revenue as early as 2003. This disease does not take long to develop and since fatality is always the endgame, high producing areas such as these would see results of epidemic proportions.

== Environment ==
Leafhoppers are the only known vectors that can carry the X-disease from a wild host into peach and cherry orchards. Orchard trees are most often infected by insect vectors. In California where it was first noted, the two most important vectors were the mountain leafhopper (Colladonus montanus) and the cherry leafhopper (Fieberiella florii).

There are seven known vectors that transmit the disease in western United States. These leafhoppers are Colladonus geminatus, Fieberiella florii, Keonolla confluens, Scaphytopius delongi, Osbornellus borealis, Colladonus montanus and Euscelidius variegatus. Other possible leafhopper vectors are Scaphytopius aculus, Paraphlepsius irroratus, Colladonus clitellarius and Norvellina seminude. Not a lot of information is available for ideal environmental conditions for the disease. However, conditions conducive to leafhoppers is most likely the key for the greatest spread of disease.

=== Mountain leafhopper ===
The mountain leafhopper (Colladonus montanus) survives on winter annual weeds during winter, usually near stream banks or canals. In late winter or spring, adults can be found in sugar beet fields and can then migrate to favored weed hosts (curly dock, burclovers) in orchards. The mountain leafhopper is most often the abundant vector found on cherry, however, cherry is not the preferred host and the leafhopper does not reproduce on cherry. Preferred hosts for the mountain leafhopper are; alfalfa, California burclover, clovers, curly dock, and sweet clovers. Of the preferred hosts alfalfa and curly dock cannot become infected with the disease itself but are just a host for the leafhopper. Occasional hosts are; vetches (in legume family) and sweet cherry. It's believed that the role of this leafhopper is introducing the disease into cherry orchards rather than spreading the disease between cherry trees within an orchard.

=== Cherry leafhopper ===
The cherry leafhopper (Fieberiella florii) has a more significant role in spreading the disease between cherry trees because cherry is a favored host. The leafhopper feeds and reproduces on a wide range of woody hosts. Preferred hosts for the cherry leafhopper are; box wood, lilac, myrtle, privet, pyracantha, sweet cherry, and viburnum. Of these preferred hosts only sweet cherry can become infected with the pathogen itself. Occasional hosts are almond, apple and crabapple, apricot, bitter cherry, ceanothus, chokecherry, hawthorn, peach, pear, Japanese plum, and prune. Of these occasional hosts, only chokecherry and bitter cherry and occasionally almond, peach and Japanese plum can become infected with the disease itself.

== Management ==
There are numerous steps one has to take to try to manage the disease as best as possible. The aim is at prevention because once the pathogen reaches the cherry trees, disease will surely ensue and there is no cure or remedy to prevent the loss of fruit production as well as the ultimate death of the tree.

=== Pest management ===
The first approach, which is the best approach at an effective management practice would be to eradicate or severely damage the mountain and cherry leafhopper population because the leafhoppers are the number one vectors for this pathogen. To do this, pesticides (i.e. acephate, bifenthrin, cyfluthrin) could be applied or biological control (predators of the leafhopper) could be used. There should be a pre-season application of control measures as well as a post-season application. This is to maximize the effort at controlling both types of leafhoppers (Cherry and Mountain), thus cutting down the starting inoculum at both stages in the life cycle.

=== Weed host management ===
Some herbaceous hosts naturally have the Cherry X Disease. Once the spreads to the cherry hosts, with the help of the mountain leafhoppers, the cherry leafhoppers can spread the disease around to other woody hosts. Here are some approaches at management with each host type:

==== Herbaceous hosts ====
The herbaceous hosts are common weeds (i.e. clovers, dandelions, alfalfa) that serve as a feeding ground for the mountain leafhoppers. The herbaceous hosts are the source of the X Disease, which is picked up and transmitted to the cherry hosts by the mountain leafhopper. (See Environment) For a control, conventional herbicides are effective. There exists a common herbaceous host, curly dock, which serves as the mountain leafhopper's main breeding ground. Getting rid of curly dock with an herbicide would be key to limit the population, thus limiting the spread of the X Disease to the cherry hosts.

==== Woody hosts ====
After the disease moves on from the herbaceous host with the help of the mountain leafhoppers, it moves to the cherry hosts (i.e. bitter cherry and chokecherry). Once there, the infected trees should be destroyed and removed, along with all infected fruits. This is to prevent further spreading into other woody hosts such as peach, plum, apple etc., because once a tree is infected, it cannot be saved and it will become a source of the X Disease which the cherry leafhoppers can pick up and spread to the other woody hosts. In conclusion, all infected woody hosts should be removed and destroyed along with all infected fruits.
