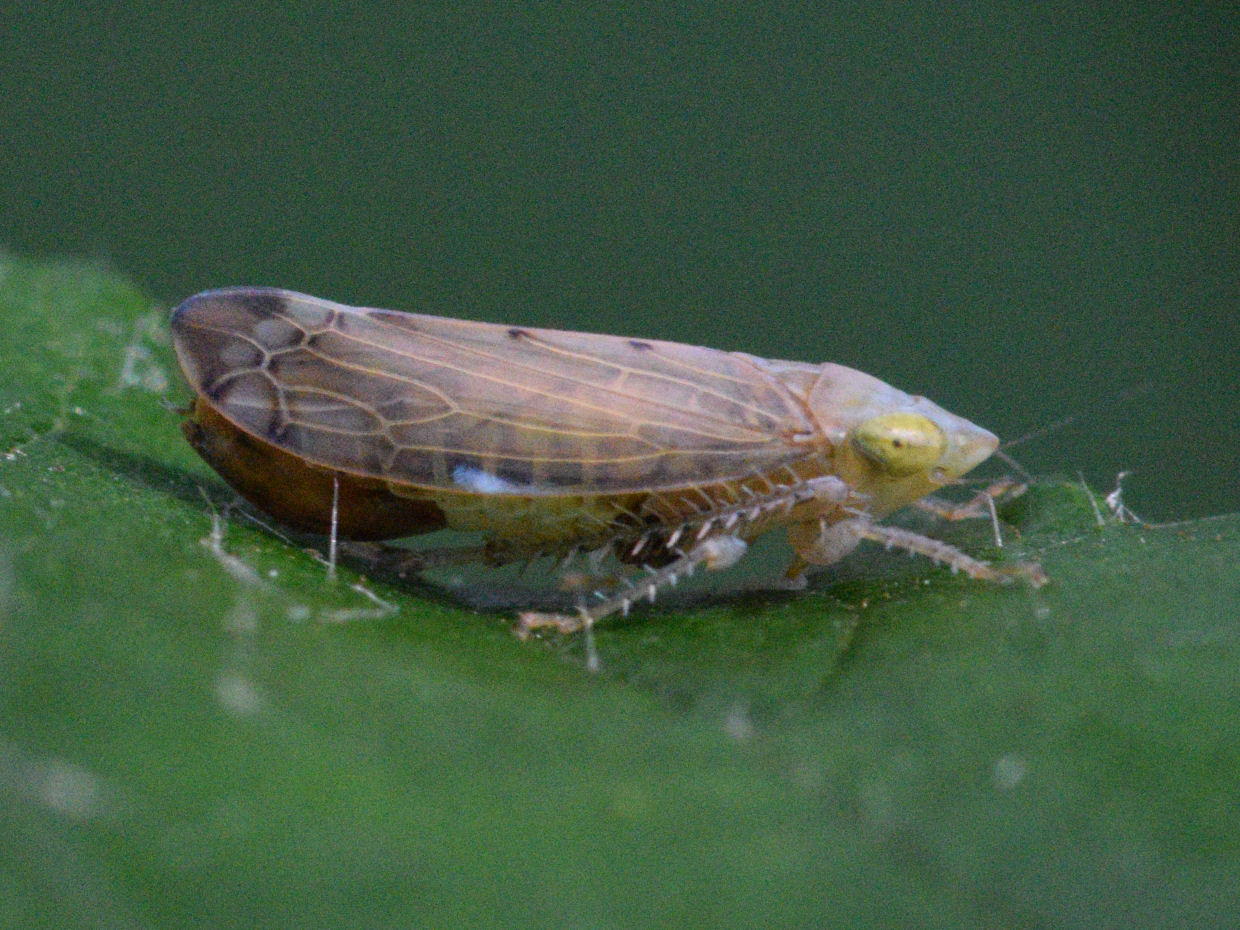
- Synophropsis lauri

Scientific classification
- Domain: Eukaryota
- Kingdom: Animalia
- Phylum: Arthropoda
- Class: Insecta
- Order: Hemiptera
- Suborder: Auchenorrhyncha
- Family: Cicadellidae
- Subfamily: Deltocephalinae
- Tribe: Fieberiellini; Wagner, 1951

Synonyms
- Synophropsini Ribaut, 1952

= Fieberiellini =

Tribe of true bugs

Fieberiellini is a tribe of leafhoppers in the subfamily Deltocephalinae. In the review by Zahniser & Dietrich (2013) it includes 48 species placed in 10 genera. Species in this tribe are native to the Palaearctic region, mainly the southern parts, with some being adventive in the Nearctic. The Cherry Leafhopper (Fieberiella florii) is a vector of several phytoplasma diseases including Cherry X Disease.

== Genera ==
There are currently 10 described genera of Fieberiellini:

- Cechenotettix Ribaut, 1942
- Docotettix Ribaut, 1948
- Dohukia Meyer-Arndt & Remane, 1992
- Ericotettix Lindberg, 1960
- Fieberiella Signoret, 1880
- Habrostis Dubovsky, 1966
- Heliotettix Rodrigues, 1968
- Parafieberiella Dlabola, 1974
- Placotettix Ribaut, 1942
- Synophropsis Haupt, 1926
