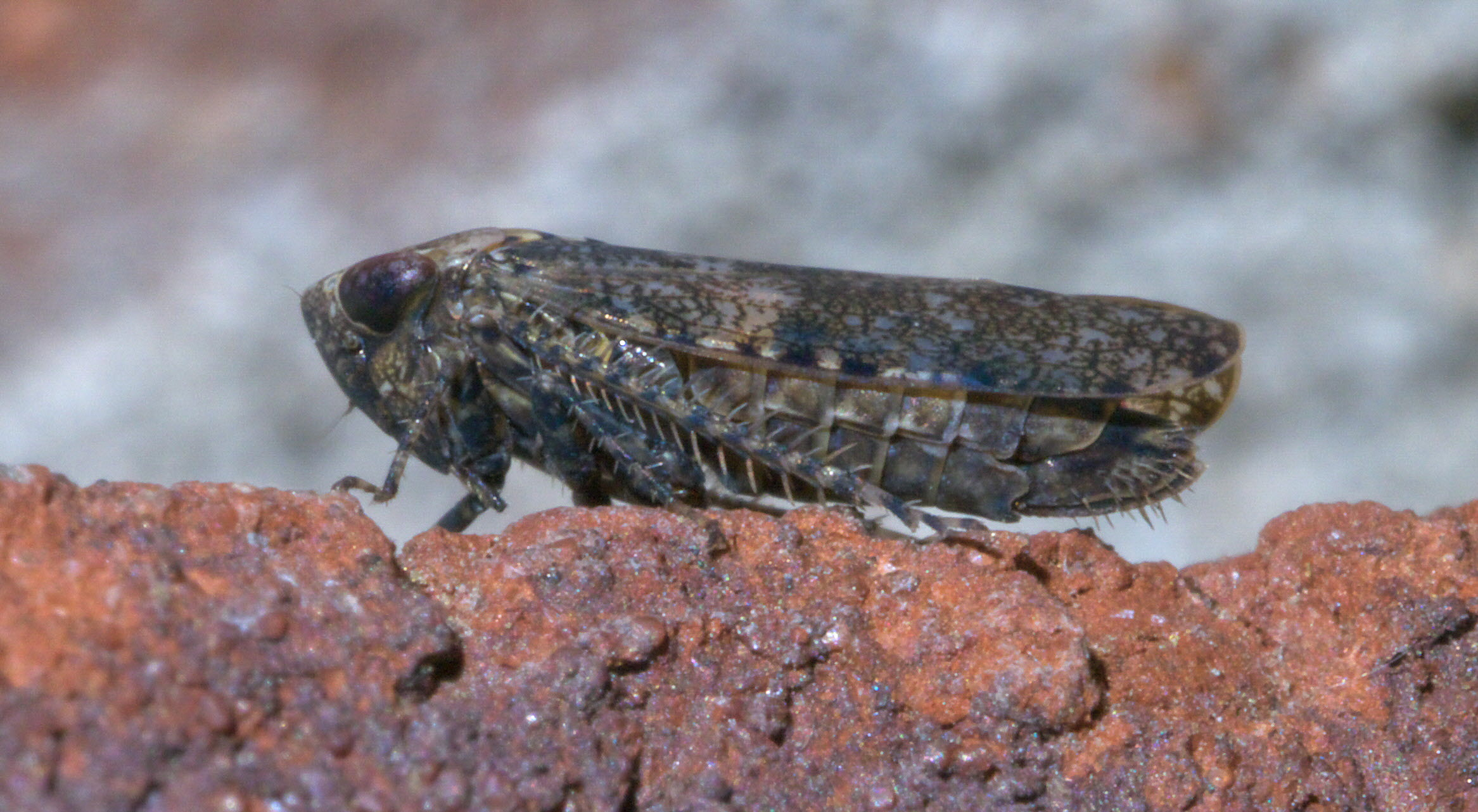
- Paraphlepsius collitus

Scientific classification
- Kingdom: Animalia
- Phylum: Arthropoda
- Class: Insecta
- Order: Hemiptera
- Suborder: Auchenorrhyncha
- Family: Cicadellidae
- Subfamily: Deltocephalinae
- Tribe: Pendarini; Dmitriev, 2009

Genera
- 8, see text.

= Pendarini =

Tribe of leafhoppers

Pendarini is a tribe of leafhoppers in the family Cicadellidae. There are eight genera and around 250 described species in Pendarini.

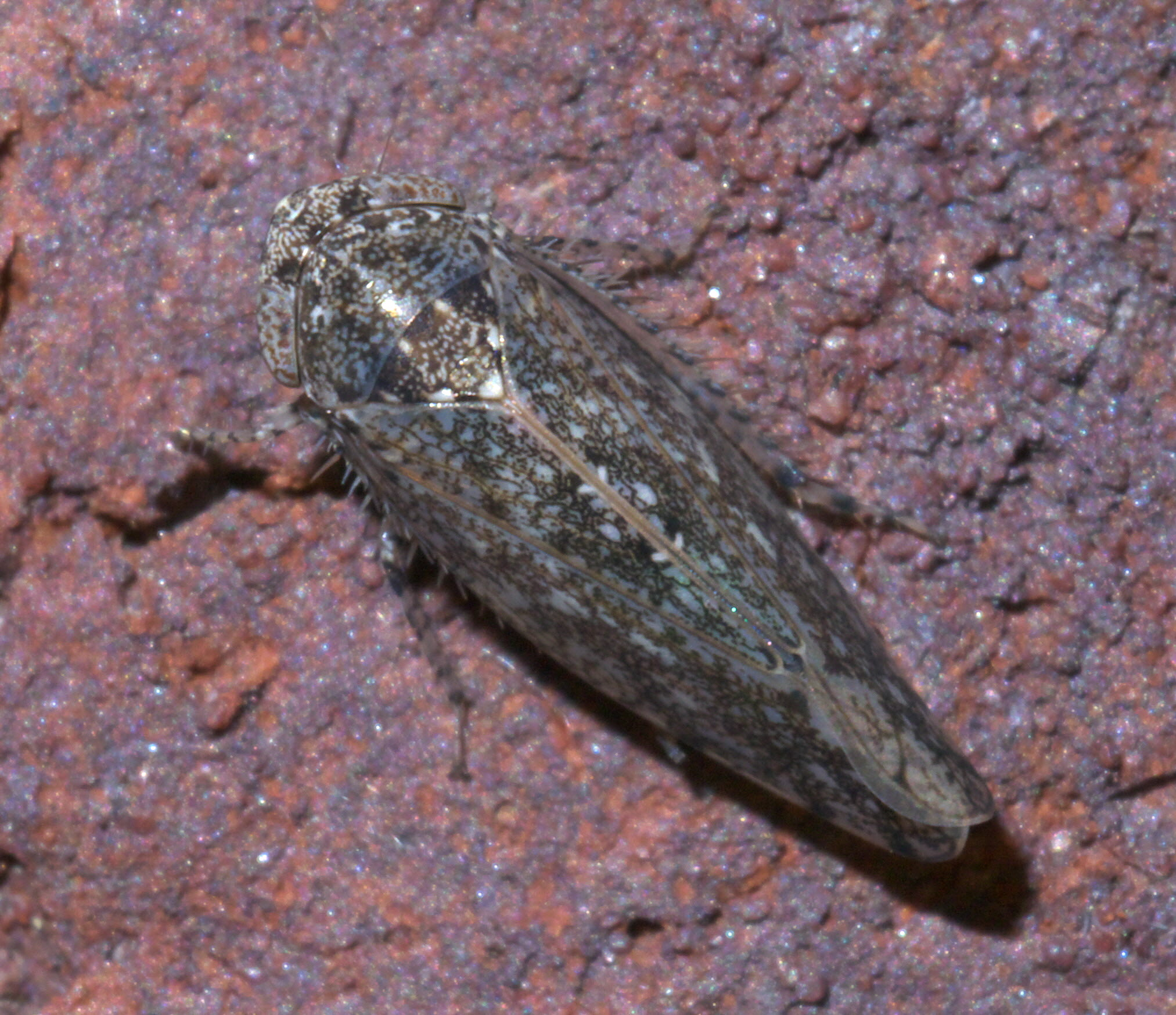
Paraphlepsius irroratus

== Genera ==
These eight genera belong to the tribe Pendarini:

- Bandaromimus Linnavuori, 1959
- Chlorotettix Van Duzee, 1892
- Copididonus Linnavuori, 1954
- Dorydiella Baker, 1897
- Ileopeltus Cwikla, 1988
- Paraphlepsius Baker, 1897
- Pendarus Ball, 1927
- Tropicanus DeLong, 1944
