= X disease =

X disease or X-disease may refer to:

- Cherry X Disease or Cherry Buckskin disease, a disease of fruit trees and other plants caused by phytoplasma bacteria
- Disease X, a hypothetical pathogen that could cause a future pandemic
