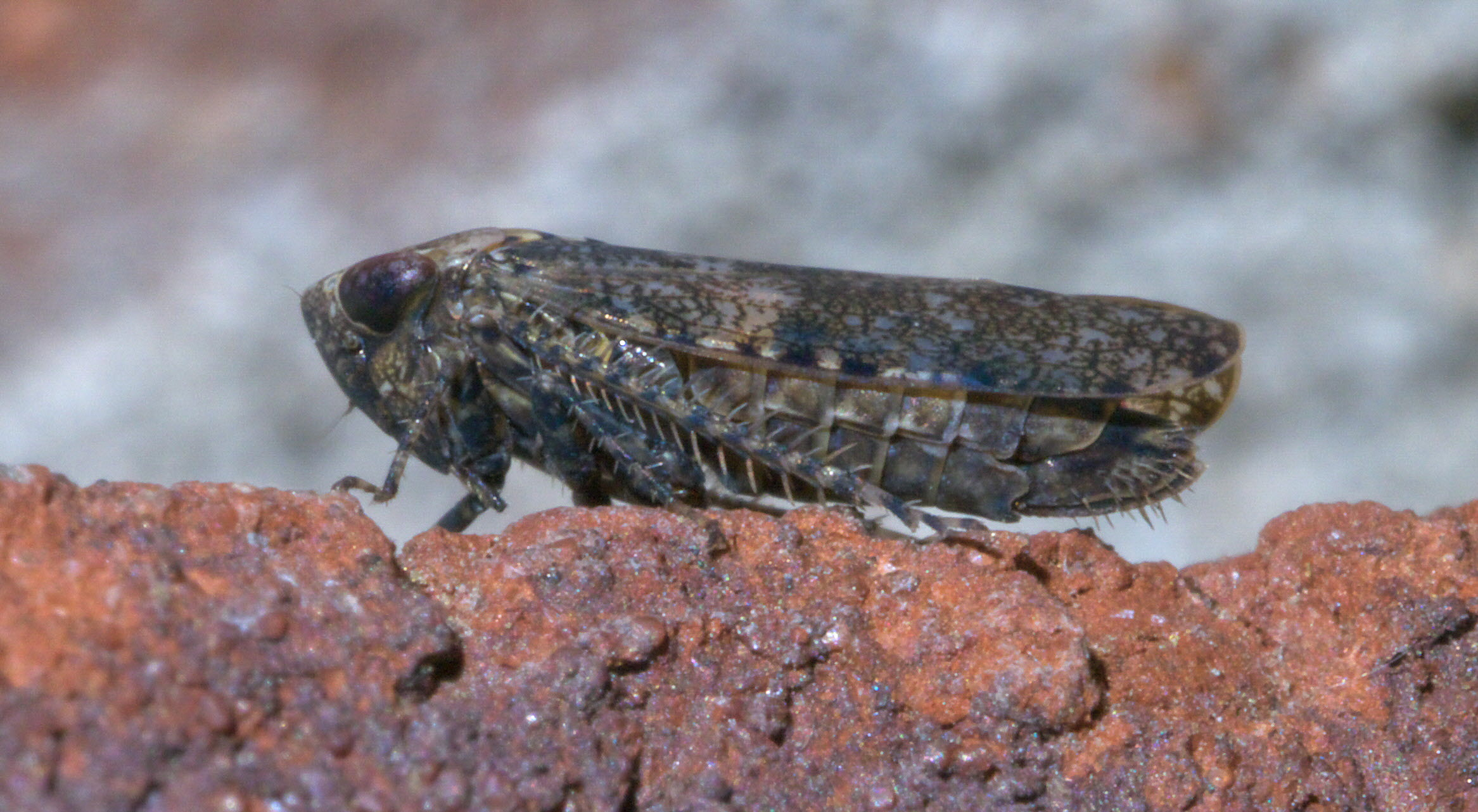
- Paraphlepsius collitus

Scientific classification
- Kingdom: Animalia
- Phylum: Arthropoda
- Class: Insecta
- Order: Hemiptera
- Suborder: Auchenorrhyncha
- Family: Cicadellidae
- Subfamily: Deltocephalinae
- Genus: Paraphlepsius; Baker, 1897

= Paraphlepsius =

Genus of leafhoppers

Paraphlepsius is a genus of leafhoppers in the family Cicadellidae. Paraphlepsius is in the tribe Pendarini within the subfamily Deltocephalinae. There are around 70 described species in Paraphlepsius.

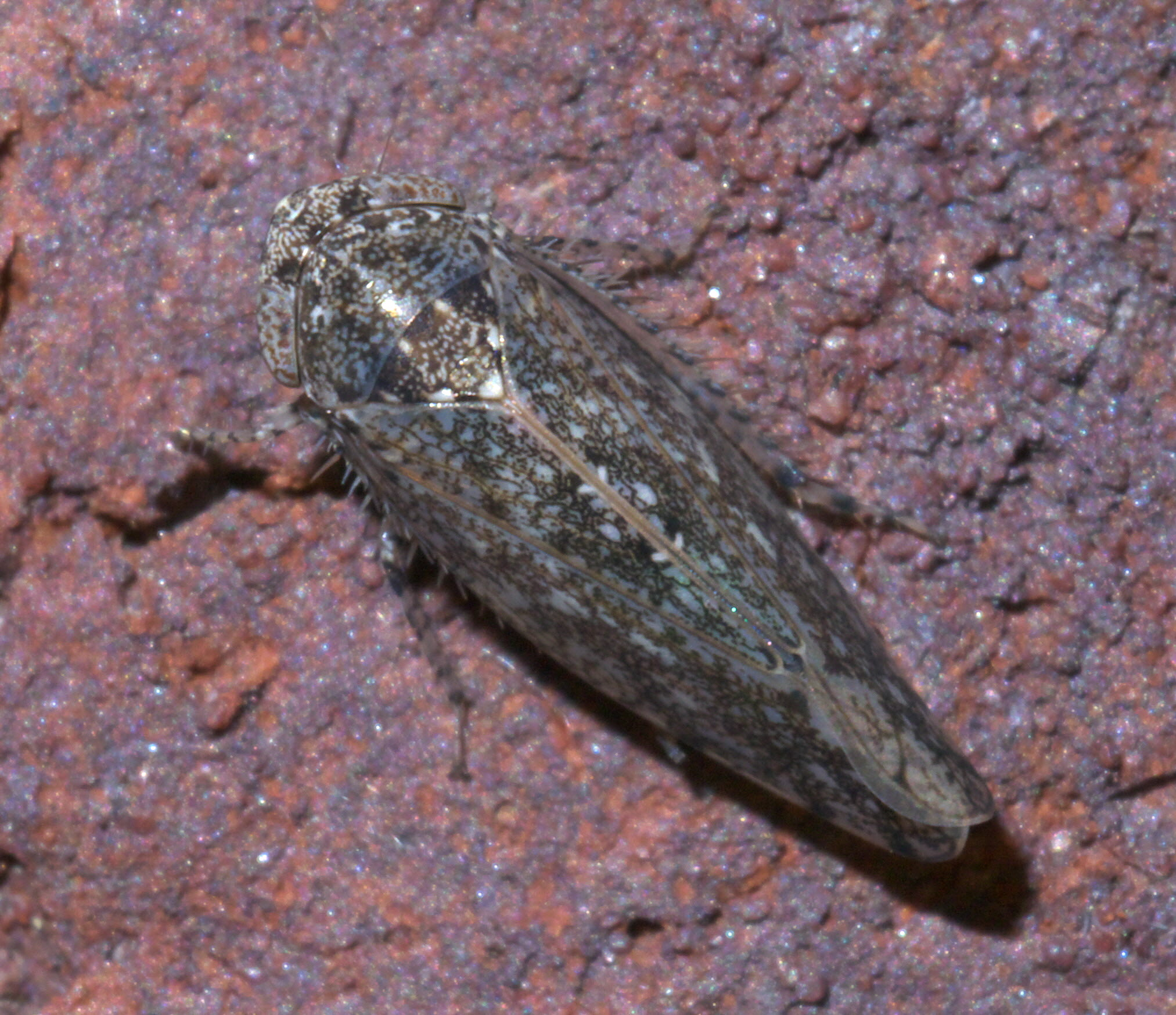
Paraphlepsius

== Species ==
These 73 species belong to the genus Paraphlepsius:

- Paraphlepsius abruptus DeLong 1938^{c g}
- Paraphlepsius acutus Crowder 1952^{c g}
- Paraphlepsius altus Osborn & Ball 1897^{c g}
- Paraphlepsius apertinus Osborn & Lathrop 1923^{c g}
- Paraphlepsius apertus (Van Duzee, 1892)^{c g b}
- Paraphlepsius attractus Ball 1909^{c g}
- Paraphlepsius bifidus Sanders & DeLong, 1917^{c g b}
- Paraphlepsius blockeri Cwikla 1980^{c g}
- Paraphlepsius brunneus DeLong 1916^{c g}
- Paraphlepsius carolinus Lathrop 1917^{c g}
- Paraphlepsius certus DeLong 1938^{c g}
- Paraphlepsius chepada DeLong 1982^{c g}
- Paraphlepsius cinereus Van Duzee 1892^{c g}
- Paraphlepsius collitus (Ball, 1903)^{c g b}
- Paraphlepsius continuus (DeLong, 1938)^{c g b}
- Paraphlepsius cornutus Crowder 1952^{c g}
- Paraphlepsius delongi Hamilton 1975^{c g}
- Paraphlepsius dentatus Baker, 1898^{c g b}
- Paraphlepsius divergens Oman 1931^{c g}
- Paraphlepsius docilis Van Duzee 1923^{c g}
- Paraphlepsius eburneolus Osborn & Lathrop, 1923^{c g b}
- Paraphlepsius electus DeLong 1938^{c g}
- Paraphlepsius emarginatus Crowder 1952^{c g}
- Paraphlepsius excavatus Crowder 1952^{c g}
- Paraphlepsius exilis Hamilton 1975^{c g}
- Paraphlepsius floridanus Ball 1909^{c g}
- Paraphlepsius fulvidorsum (Fitch, 1851)^{c g b}
- Paraphlepsius fuscipennis Van Duzee 1892^{c g}
- Paraphlepsius geneticus Hamilton 1975^{c g}
- Paraphlepsius hemicolor Sanders & DeLong 1923^{c g}
- Paraphlepsius humidus Van Duzee 1892^{c g}
- Paraphlepsius incisus Van Duzee 1892^{c g}
- Paraphlepsius irroratus (Say, 1830)^{c g b} (bespeckled leafhopper)
- Paraphlepsius lascivius (Ball, 1900)^{c g b}
- Paraphlepsius latifrons Van Duzee 1892^{c g}
- Paraphlepsius lobatus Osborn 1898^{c g}
- Paraphlepsius lupalus Hamilton 1975^{c g}
- Paraphlepsius luxuria Hamilton 1975^{c g}
- Paraphlepsius maculellus Osborn 1915^{c g}
- Paraphlepsius maculosus Osborn 1923^{c g}
- Paraphlepsius micronotatus Osborn & Lathrop, 1923^{c g b}
- Paraphlepsius mimus Baker 1898^{c g}
- Paraphlepsius nebulosus Van Duzee 1892^{c g}
- Paraphlepsius obvius Oman 1931^{c g}
- Paraphlepsius occidentalis Baker 1898^{c g}
- Paraphlepsius operculatus Ball 1927^{c g}
- Paraphlepsius orthana DeLong & Linnavuori 1978^{c g}
- Paraphlepsius pallidus Van Duzee 1892^{c g}
- Paraphlepsius particolor Sanders & DeLong 1920^{c g}
- Paraphlepsius planus Sanders & DeLong 1922^{c g}
- Paraphlepsius pusillus Baker 1898^{c g}
- Paraphlepsius quadratus Hamilton 1975^{c g}
- Paraphlepsius rileyi Baker 1898^{c g}
- Paraphlepsius rossi DeLong, 1938^{c g b}
- Paraphlepsius siclus DeLong 1938^{c g}
- Paraphlepsius solidaginis Walker, 1851^{c g b}
- Paraphlepsius spinosus Crowder 1952^{c g}
- Paraphlepsius strobi Fitch 1851^{c g}
- Paraphlepsius superior Hamilton 1975^{c g}
- Paraphlepsius supinus DeLong 1938^{c g}
- Paraphlepsius tennessa DeLong 1916^{c g}
- Paraphlepsius tennessus^{b}
- Paraphlepsius texanus Baker, 1898^{c g b} (Texas prairie leafhopper)
- Paraphlepsius tigrinus Ball 1909^{c g}
- Paraphlepsius torridus Lathrop 1917^{c g}
- Paraphlepsius truncatus Van Duzee 1892^{c g}
- Paraphlepsius tubus Ball 1909^{c g}
- Paraphlepsius turpiculus Ball 1900^{c g}
- Paraphlepsius umbellatus Hamilton 1975^{c g}
- Paraphlepsius umbrosus Sanders & DeLong 1917^{c g}
- Paraphlepsius varispinus Hamilton, 1972^{c g b}
- Paraphlepsius ventosus DeLong 1944^{c g}
- Paraphlepsius zanclois Hamilton 1975^{c g}

Data sources: i = ITIS, c = Catalogue of Life, g = GBIF, b = Bugguide.net
