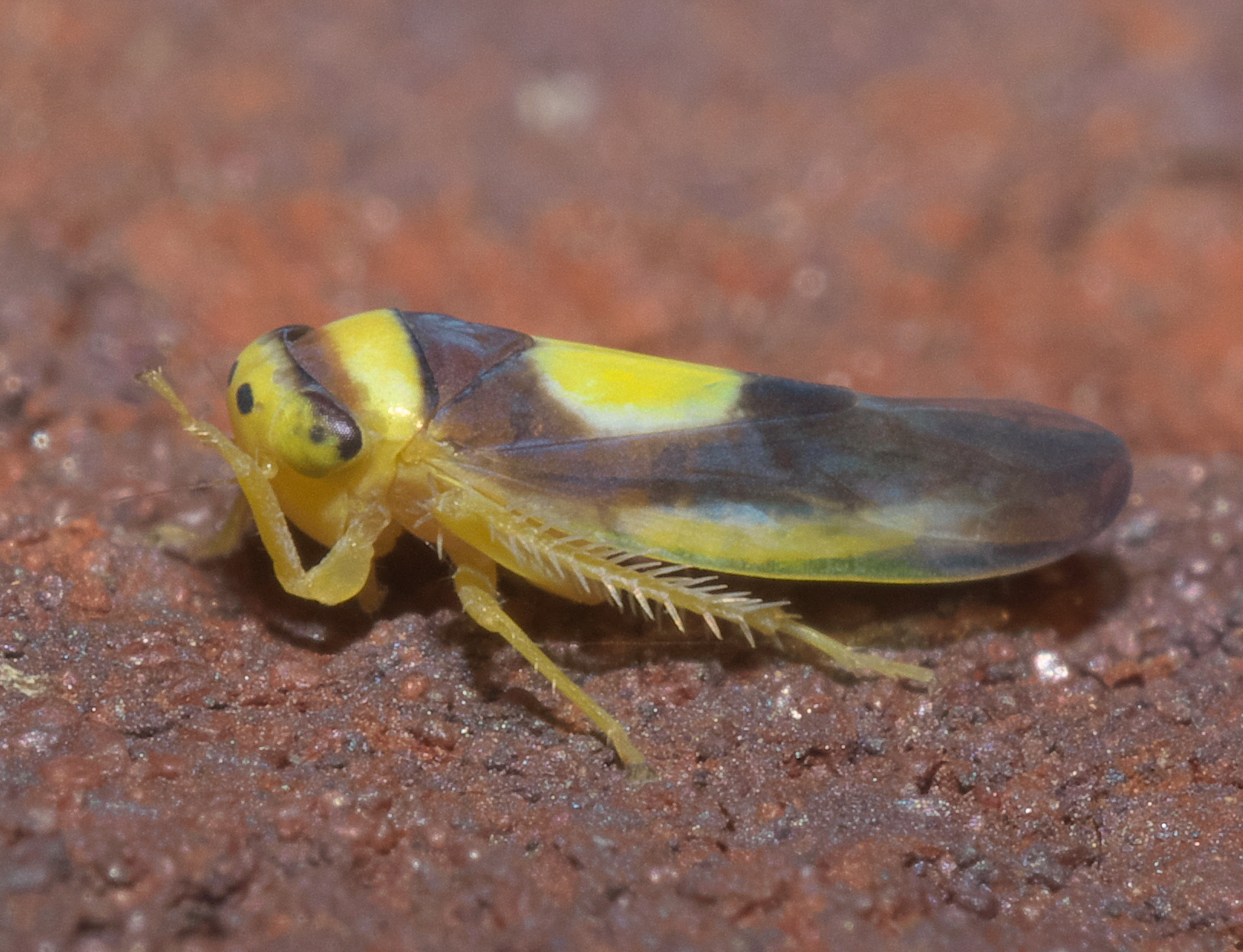

Scientific classification
- Domain: Eukaryota
- Kingdom: Animalia
- Phylum: Arthropoda
- Class: Insecta
- Order: Hemiptera
- Suborder: Auchenorrhyncha
- Family: Cicadellidae
- Genus: Colladonus
- Species: C. clitellarius

Binomial name
- Colladonus clitellarius (Say, 1830)

= Colladonus clitellarius =

Insect species

Colladonus clitellarius, the saddled leafhopper, is a species of leafhopper in the genus Colladonus.

== Description ==
Adults of C. clitellarius are 5 to 6 mm long, with males often being slightly smaller than females. Their overall coloration is brown to black with a bright green "saddle" shaped mark on their back being a key diagnostic feature of the species, alongside brown and green or white stripes on the head. This pattern extends into the insects' eyes, resulting in a bi-colored appearance.

Colladonus clitellarius nymphs share similar coloration to adults, though paler and with mottled patterns.

== Range and habitat ==
The saddled leadhopper occurs in eastern North America. It resides primarily in forested environments in the northeastern United States and southeastern Canada.

== Ecology ==
Adults are found most commonly from May to November. Major host plants for the species include willows, honey locusts, and the mile-a-minute vine. It is also a known vector of Cherry X Disease in peaches.

== Etymology ==
The specific epithet "clitellarius" comes from the Latin word meaning back-saddled. This, alongside its common name "saddled leafhopper", is in reference to the saddle-like green marking on the backs of adults in this species.
