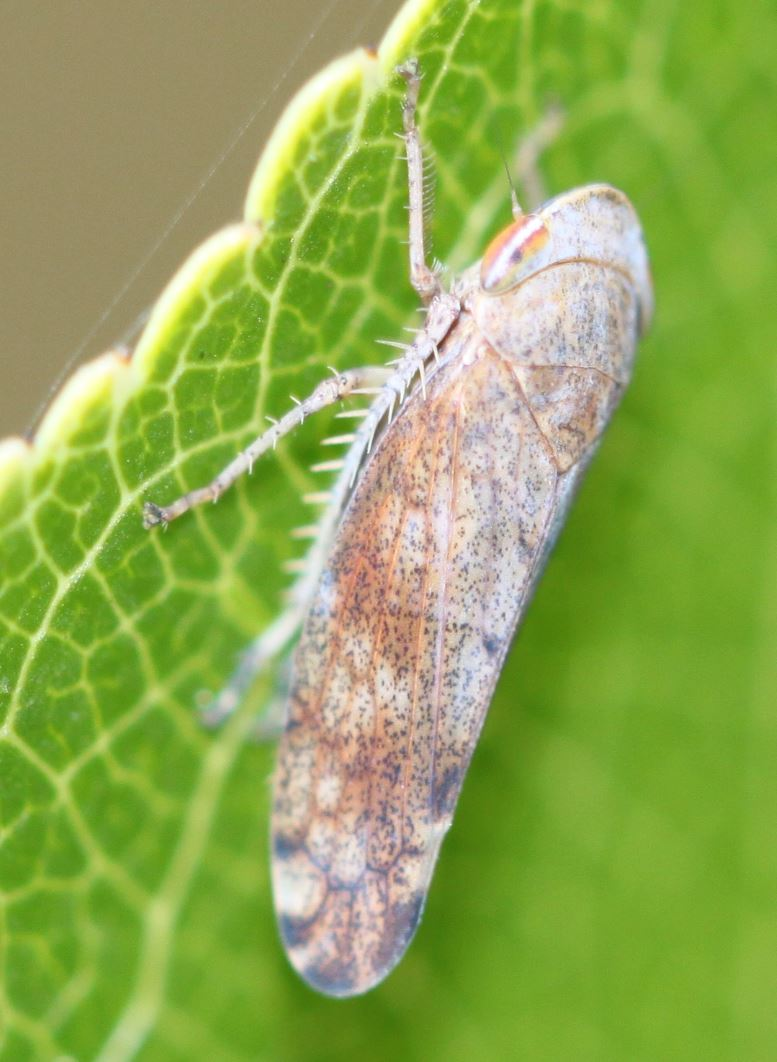
- Fieberiella florii

Scientific classification
- Domain: Eukaryota
- Kingdom: Animalia
- Phylum: Arthropoda
- Class: Insecta
- Order: Hemiptera
- Suborder: Auchenorrhyncha
- Family: Cicadellidae
- Tribe: Fieberiellini
- Genus: Fieberiella; Signoret, 1880

= Fieberiella =

Genus of leafhoppers

Fieberiella is a genus of leafhoppers in the family Cicadellidae. There are at least 20 described species in Fieberiella.

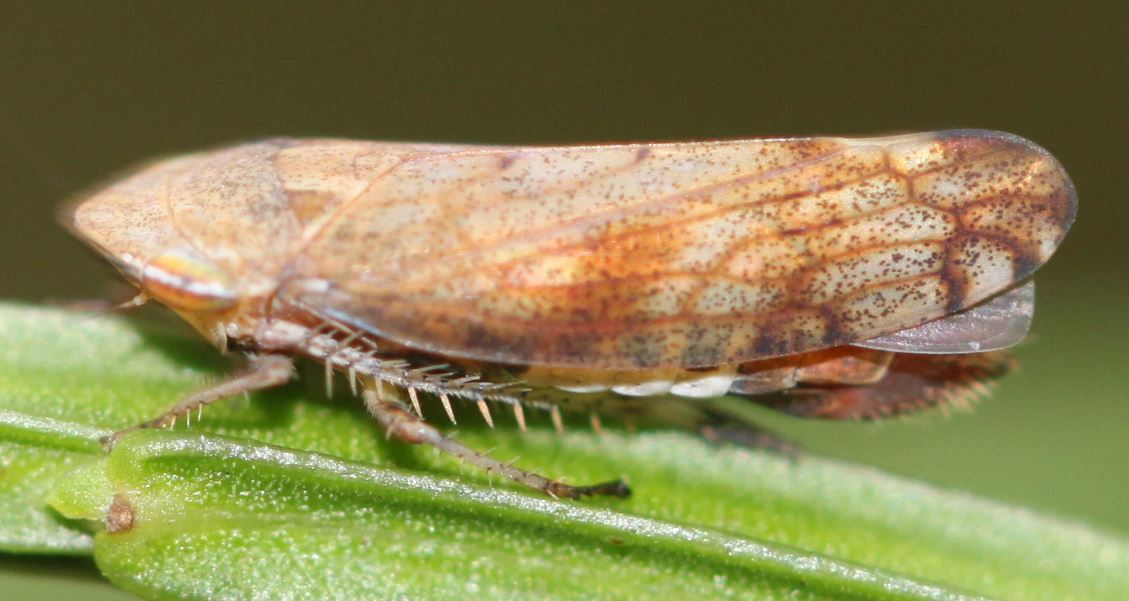
Fieberiella florii

== Species ==
These 23 species belong to the genus Fieberiella:

- Fieberiella anategea Meyer-Arndt 1991^{c g}
- Fieberiella aschei Meyer-Arndt 1988^{c g}
- Fieberiella bohemica Dlabola 1965^{c g}
- Fieberiella chioscola Meyer-Arndt 1988^{c g}
- Fieberiella drosopouli Meyer-Arndt 1988^{c g}
- Fieberiella duffelsi Wagner 1963^{c g}
- Fieberiella florii (Stal, 1864)^{c g b} (privet leafhopper)
- Fieberiella gemelina Dlabola 1965^{c g}
- Fieberiella hyrcana Dlabola 1984^{c g}
- Fieberiella ida Dlabola 1965^{c g}
- Fieberiella knighti Dlabola 1965^{c g}
- Fieberiella kritiella Dlabola 1989^{c g}
- Fieberiella leridana Dlabola 1985^{c g}
- Fieberiella lindbergi Wagner 1963^{c g}
- Fieberiella lugubris Emeljanov, 1964^{g}
- Fieberiella macchiae Linnavuori 1962^{c g}
- Fieberiella malickana Dlabola 1994^{c g}
- Fieberiella oenderi Dlabola 1985^{c g}
- Fieberiella pallida Melichar 1896^{c g}
- Fieberiella peloponnissi Meyer-Arndt 1988^{c g}
- Fieberiella pulcherrima Berg 1879^{c g}
- Fieberiella salacia Dlabola 1965^{c g}
- Fieberiella septentrionalis W.Wagner, 1963^{g}

Data sources: i = ITIS, c = Catalogue of Life, g = GBIF, b = Bugguide.net
