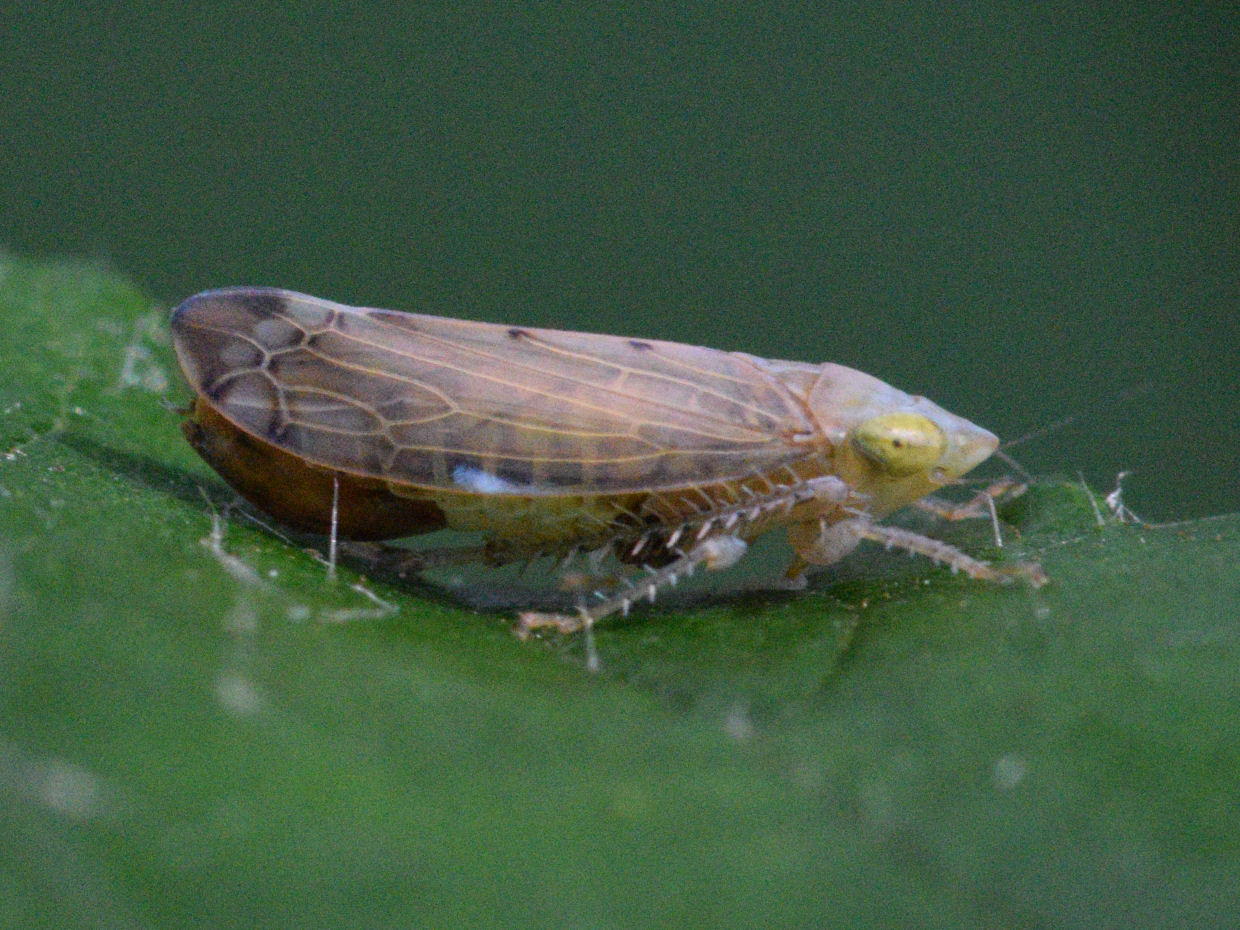
- Specimen from Cambridge, England

Scientific classification
- Kingdom: Animalia
- Phylum: Arthropoda
- Clade: Pancrustacea
- Class: Insecta
- Order: Hemiptera
- Suborder: Auchenorrhyncha
- Family: Cicadellidae
- Subfamily: Deltocephalinae
- Tribe: Fieberiellini
- Genus: Synophropsis; Haupt, 1926
- Species: S. lauri

Binomial name
- Synophropsis lauri (Horváth, 1897)

Synonyms
- Thamnotettix lauri Horváth, 1897; Synophropsis wagneri Haupt, 1926

= Synophropsis =

Genus of true bugs

Synophropsis lauri, sometimes called the bay leafhopper, is a species of leafhopper of the subfamily Deltocephalinae, tribe Fieberiellini. It is the only species in the monotypic genus Synophropsis.

== Description ==
The hemelytra vary from greyish to brick-red (some sources say the males are grey, females red) and are somewhat translucent with the veins showing up as whitish. The wings darken towards the tips. There are small dark marks along the suture and at the distal ends of some of the long veins. The head is yellowish and the vertex is sharply pointed. Antennae are filamentous and very long. Size: up to 6.5mm long, or even 7mm.

Nymphs are green, and over-winter. The species is normally said to be univoltine, but it is possible that the females hibernate and produce a second generation.

== Origin and spread ==
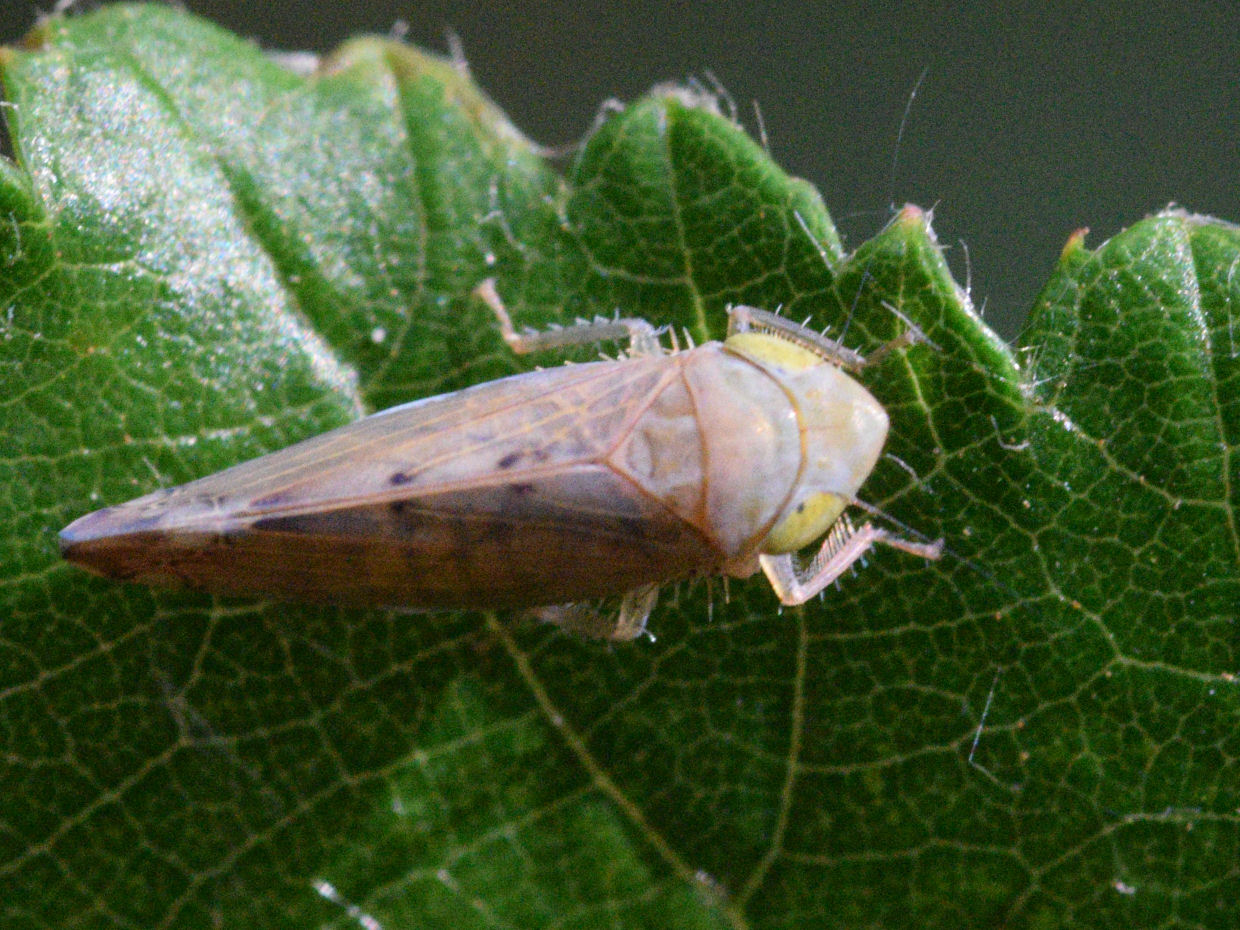
Dorsal view

The species was first described, as Thamnotettix lauri, by Géza Horváth in 1897 from specimens taken in Fiume (Rijeka) and Buccari (Bakar) on the Adriatic coast of what is now Croatia. Nearly 30 years later, Hermann Haupt independently described a single male taken in Gravosa (Gruž), some 260 miles (420 km) further southeast. Haupt placed it in a new genus as Synophropsis wagneri. As these are now regarded as descriptions of the same species, Horvath's specific name has priority even though Haupt's new genus is accepted.

Throughout much of the 20th century it was regarded as a pontomediterranean species, i.e. inhabiting the area between the Black Sea (ho pontos to the ancient Greeks) and the Mediterranean. Since then it has expanded its range rapidly northwards and westwards. It has been known in France, initially Montpellier, since 1972, and in Switzerland since 2000. In 2008–09 it was discovered in Hamburg and Öhringen, two widely separated locations in Germany, and also at Liège in Belgium. It reached the London area in 2007, and has since been found elsewhere in the United Kingdom – the insect in the taxobox was seen in Cambridge in 2014.

== Host plants ==
Synophropsis lauri is polyphagous on evergreen broad-leaved trees and shrubs. It was first described as frequenting, and takes its specific name from, the European bay laurel (Laurus nobilis). This tree, now cultivated far outside its natural Mediterranean range, is a favourite where available. In western Europe specimens of S. lauri have mostly been taken from ivy (Hedera helix). In Turkey S. lauri is listed as a minor pest of olive (Olea europaea) groves.
