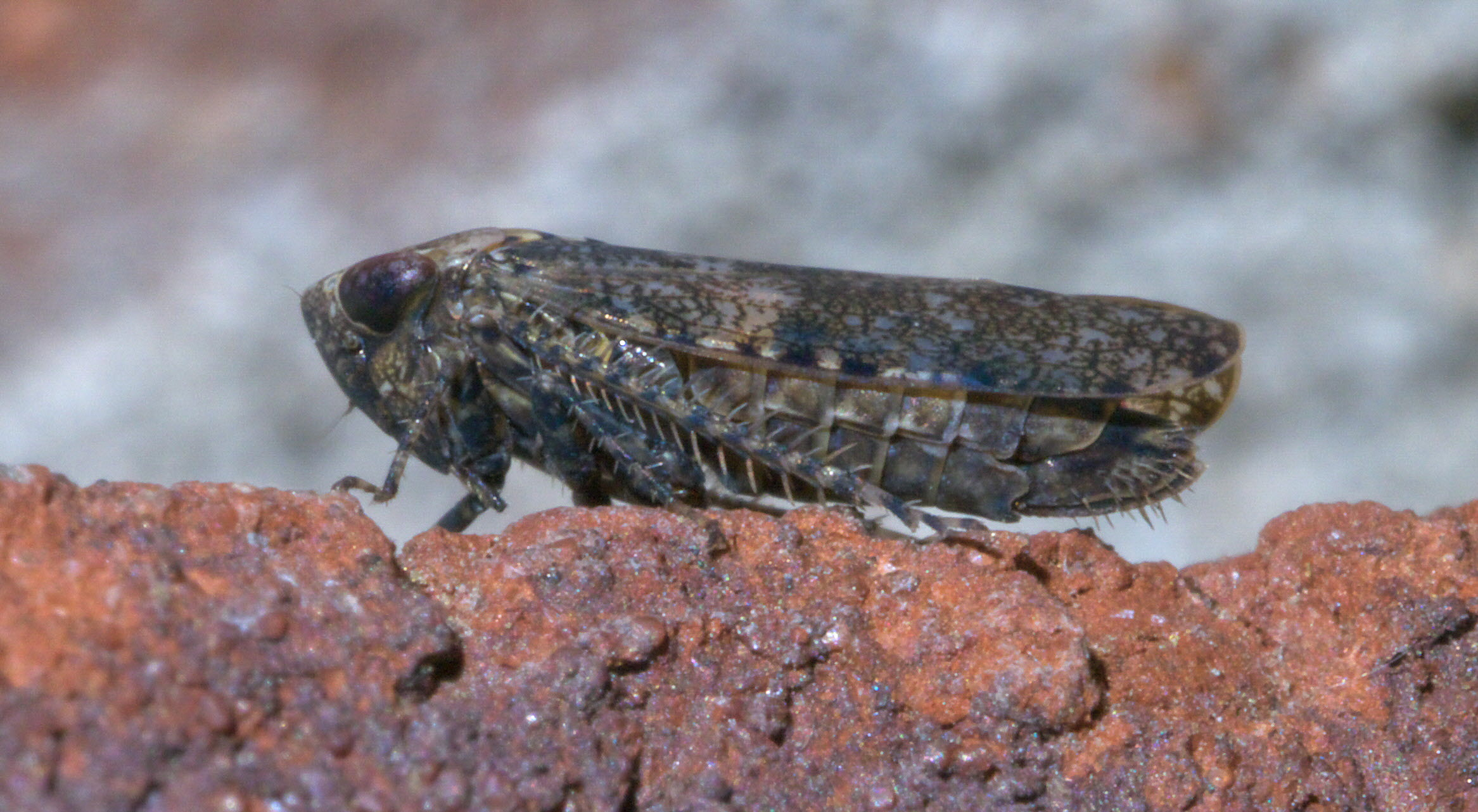

Scientific classification
- Domain: Eukaryota
- Kingdom: Animalia
- Phylum: Arthropoda
- Class: Insecta
- Order: Hemiptera
- Suborder: Auchenorrhyncha
- Family: Cicadellidae
- Genus: Paraphlepsius
- Species: P. collitus

Binomial name
- Paraphlepsius collitus (Ball, 1903)

= Paraphlepsius collitus =

Species of true bug

Paraphlepsius collitus is a species of leafhopper in the family Cicadellidae.

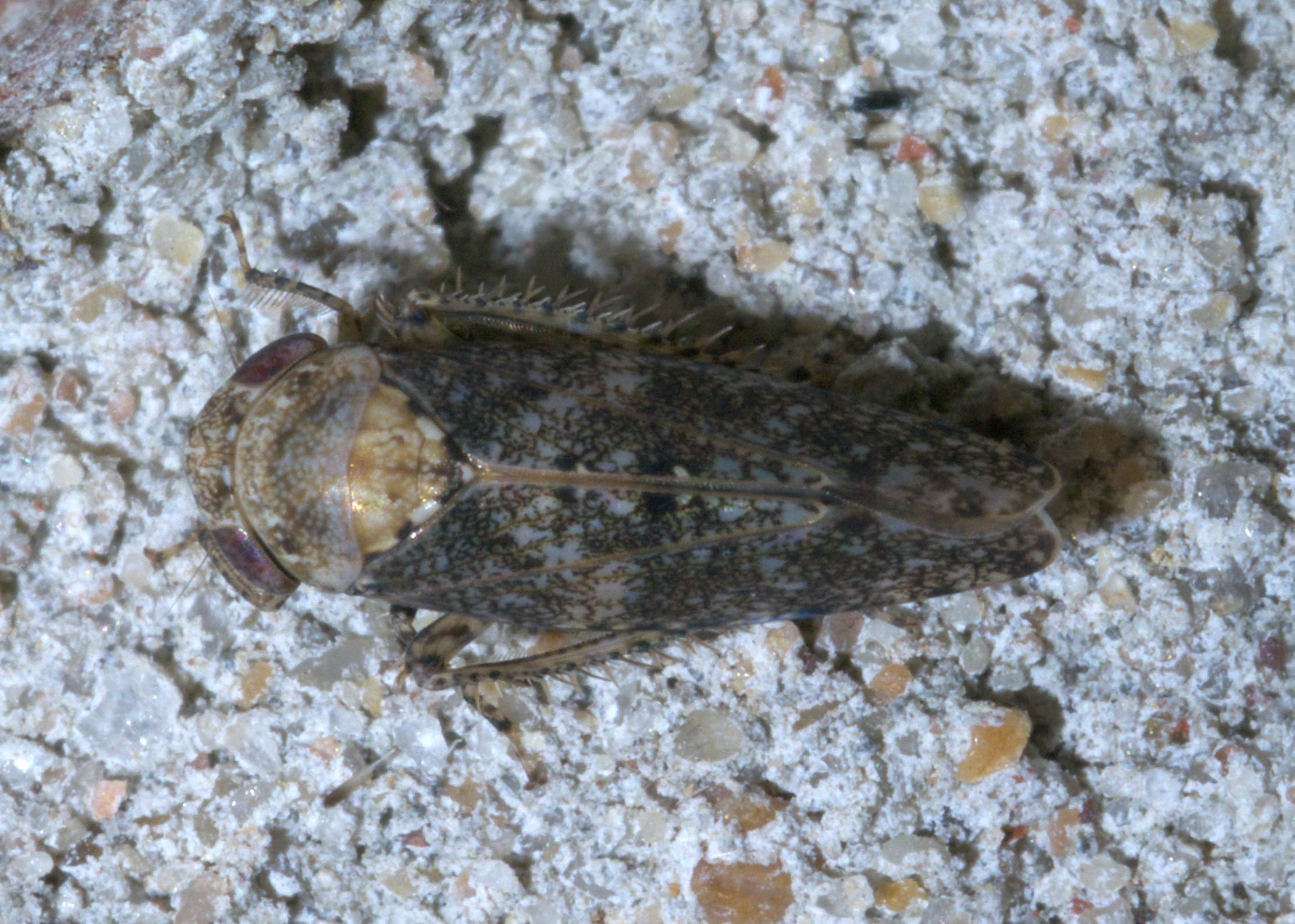
