= Japanese plum =

Japanese plum is a common name for multiple trees producing edible fruits and may refer to:

- Prunus salicina
- Loquat (Eriobotrya japonica)

== See also ==
- Prunus japonica, Japanese bush cherry
