= Colladonus montanus =

Scientific classification
- Domain: Eukaryota
- Kingdom: Animalia
- Phylum: Arthropoda
- Class: Insecta
- Order: Hemiptera
- Suborder: Auchenorrhyncha
- Family: Cicadellidae
- Genus: Colladonus
- Species: C. montanus

Binomial name
- Colladonus montanus (Van Duzee, 1892)

Species of leafhopper

Colladonus montanus is a species of leafhopper.
