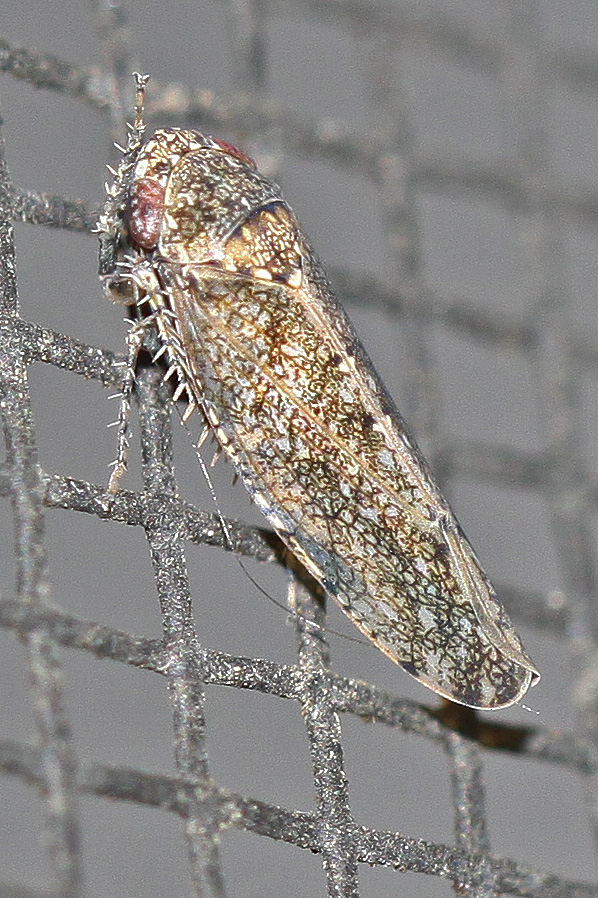

Scientific classification
- Domain: Eukaryota
- Kingdom: Animalia
- Phylum: Arthropoda
- Class: Insecta
- Order: Hemiptera
- Suborder: Auchenorrhyncha
- Family: Cicadellidae
- Genus: Paraphlepsius
- Species: P. irroratus

Binomial name
- Paraphlepsius irroratus (Say, 1830)

= Paraphlepsius irroratus =

Species of true bug

Paraphlepsius irroratus, known generally as bespeckled leafhopper, is a species of leafhopper in the family Cicadellidae. Other common names include the irrorate leafhopper and brown-speckled leafhopper.
