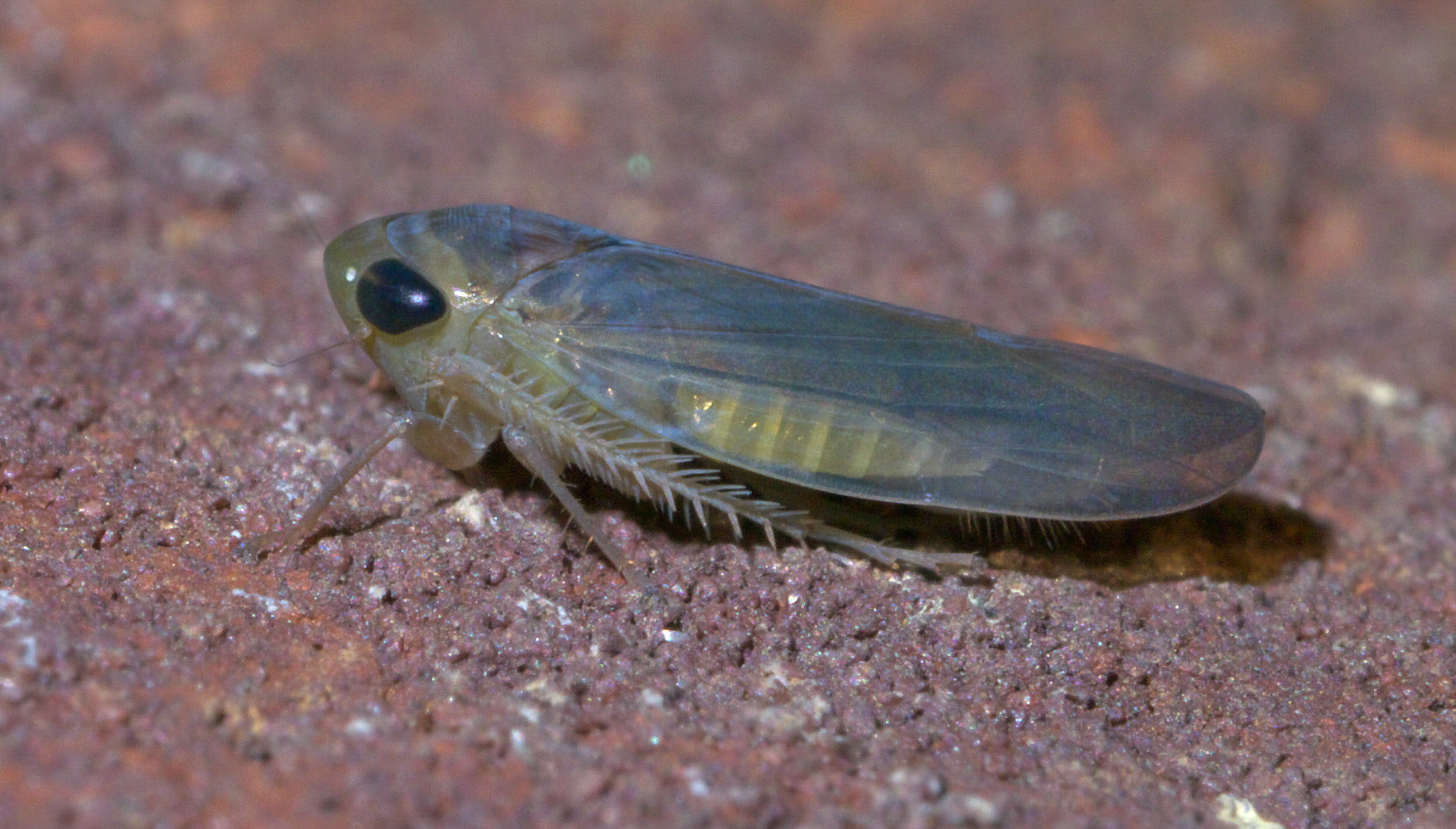
- Chlorotettix

Scientific classification
- Domain: Eukaryota
- Kingdom: Animalia
- Phylum: Arthropoda
- Class: Insecta
- Order: Hemiptera
- Suborder: Auchenorrhyncha
- Family: Cicadellidae
- Subfamily: Deltocephalinae
- Tribe: Athysanini
- Genus: Chlorotettix; Van Duzee, 1892

Subgenera
- Chacotettix Linnavuori, 1955; Chlorotettix

= Chlorotettix =

Genus of insects

Chlorotettix is a genus of typical leafhoppers in the family Cicadellidae. There are at least 100 described species in Chlorotettix, found in North, Central, and South America.

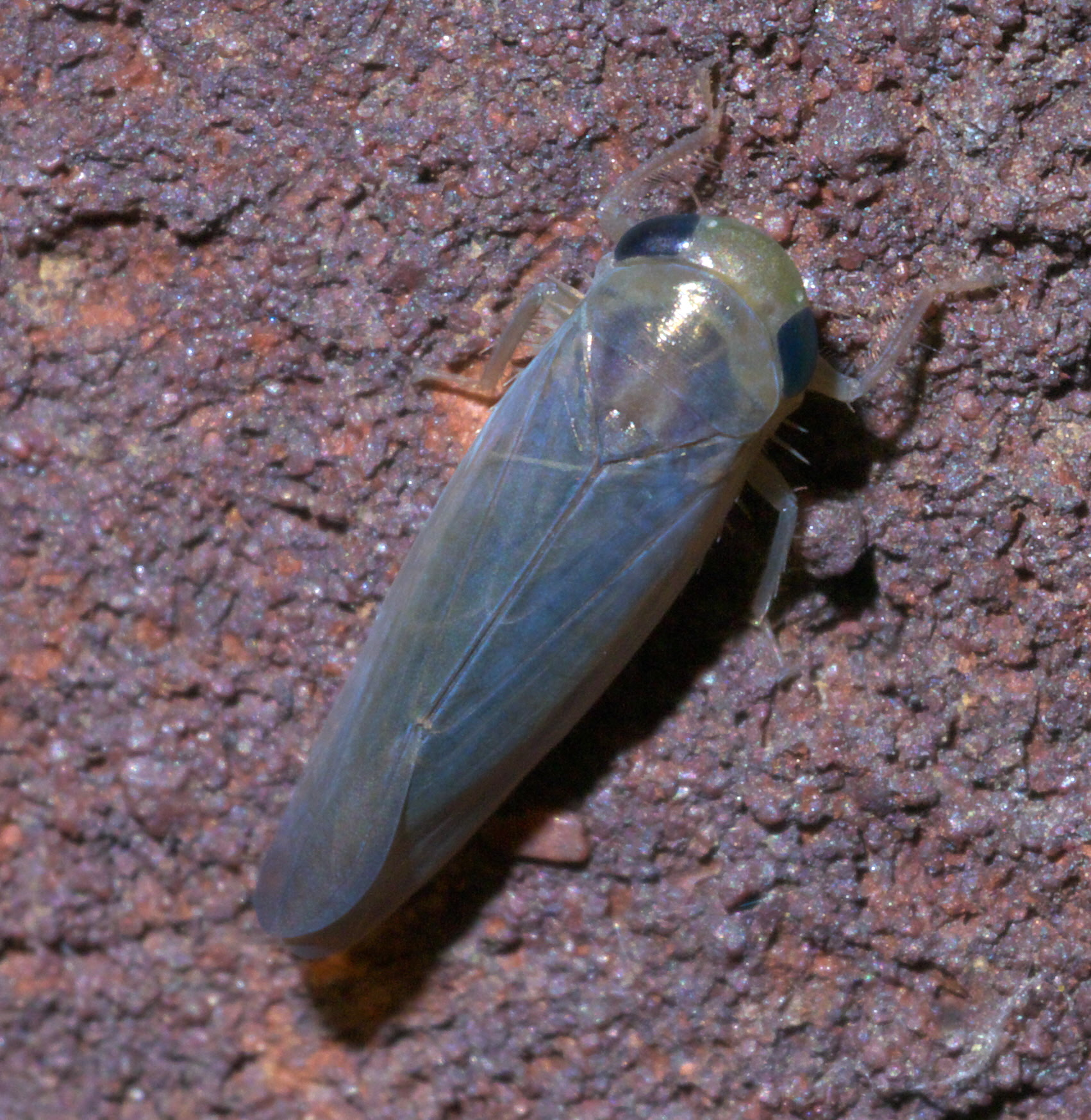
Chlorotettix tergatus

== Species ==
These 100 species belong to the genus Chlorotettix:

- Chlorotettix albidus (Walker, 1851)
- Chlorotettix atriceps Linnavuori, 1959
- Chlorotettix attenuatus Brown, 1933
- Chlorotettix aurum DeLong, 1938
- Chlorotettix bakeri Sanders & DeLong, 1922
- Chlorotettix balli Osborn, 1898
- Chlorotettix bergi Linnavuori, 1959
- Chlorotettix berryi DeLong, 1945
- Chlorotettix bimaculatus DeLong & Linnavuori, 1978
- Chlorotettix bipartitus DeLong, 1945
- Chlorotettix boliviellus DeLong & Martinson, 1974
- Chlorotettix borealis Sanders & DeLong, 1917
- Chlorotettix breviceps Baker, 1898
- Chlorotettix brunneus DeLong, 1945
- Chlorotettix canolaterus Cwikla & Freytag, 1982
- Chlorotettix capensis Sanders & DeLong, 1922
- Chlorotettix caudatus DeLong & Linnavuori, 1979
- Chlorotettix delicatus Osborn, 1923
- Chlorotettix dentatus Sanders & DeLong, 1923
- Chlorotettix divergens Sanders & DeLong, 1922
- Chlorotettix dozieri Sanders & DeLong, 1922
- Chlorotettix duospinus DeLong & Martinson, 1974
- Chlorotettix emarginatus Baker, 1898
- Chlorotettix essbejus Zanol, 2001
- Chlorotettix excultus Sanders & DeLong, 1922
- Chlorotettix fallax Sanders & DeLong, 1922
- Chlorotettix filamenta DeLong, 1937
- Chlorotettix floridanus DeLong, 1924
- Chlorotettix forcipatus DeLong & Linnavuori, 1979
- Chlorotettix frameus DeLong & Linnavuori, 1978
- Chlorotettix fraterculus (Berg, 1879)
- Chlorotettix fuscus Brown, 1933
- Chlorotettix galbanatus Van Duzee, 1892
- Chlorotettix giganteus Linnavuori, 1959
- Chlorotettix grandis Linnavuori, 1959
- Chlorotettix hamiltoni Zanol, 2002
- Chlorotettix harmodios Linnavuori, 1973
- Chlorotettix iridescens DeLong, 1916
- Chlorotettix kassiphone Linnavuori, 1959
- Chlorotettix languidus Linnavuori, 1959
- Chlorotettix latocinctus DeLong, 1945
- Chlorotettix latus Brown, 1933
- Chlorotettix limosus DeLong & Cartwright, 1926
- Chlorotettix lingulus DeLong & Martinson, 1974
- Chlorotettix liquarus DeLong & Martinson, 1974
- Chlorotettix lobatus Osborn, 1918
- Chlorotettix longibrachium Cheng, 1980
- Chlorotettix lugens Linnavuori, 1959
- Chlorotettix lusorius (Osborn & Ball, 1897)
- Chlorotettix luteosus (Baker, 1926)
- Chlorotettix maculatus Singh-Pruthi, 1936
- Chlorotettix malevius DeLong & Martinson, 1974
- Chlorotettix mansuetus DeLong, 1982
- Chlorotettix maximus (Berg, 1879)
- Chlorotettix melanotus DeLong, 1916
- Chlorotettix meriscus Cwikla, 1987
- Chlorotettix minimus Baker, 1898
- Chlorotettix montanus Caldwell, 1952
- Chlorotettix nauticus DeLong, 1982
- Chlorotettix necopinus Van Duzee, 1893
- Chlorotettix neotropicus Jensen-Haarup, 1922
- Chlorotettix nigrolabes DeLong, 1945
- Chlorotettix nigromaculatus DeLong, 1923
- Chlorotettix nimbuliferus (Berg, 1884)
- Chlorotettix nudatus Ball, 1900
- Chlorotettix obscurus DeLong, 1945
- Chlorotettix obsenus DeLong, 1937
- Chlorotettix ogloblini Linnavuori, 1959
- Chlorotettix orbonatus (Ball, 1903)
- Chlorotettix pinus DeLong, 1945
- Chlorotettix polymaculatus Cheng, 1980
- Chlorotettix protensus Linnavuori, 1959
- Chlorotettix redimiculus DeLong, 1945
- Chlorotettix rotundus Brown, 1933
- Chlorotettix rugicollis Ball, 1903
- Chlorotettix scutellatus Osborn, 1918
- Chlorotettix septempunctus Linnavuori & DeLong, 1979
- Chlorotettix serius (Stål, 1862)
- Chlorotettix similis DeLong, 1918
- Chlorotettix sinchona DeLong & Linnavuori, 1978
- Chlorotettix sinchonus DeLong & Linnavuori, 1978
- Chlorotettix smodix Hamilton, 2017
- Chlorotettix spatulatus Osborn & Ball, 1897
- Chlorotettix spinellus DeLong & Martinson, 1974
- Chlorotettix spiniloba Linnavuori, 1968
- Chlorotettix striatus DeLong, 1945
- Chlorotettix subfuscus DeLong, 1945
- Chlorotettix suturalis DeLong, 1916
- Chlorotettix sycophantus Linnavuori, 1955
- Chlorotettix tergatus (Fitch, 1851)
- Chlorotettix torqus DeLong & Linnavuori, 1978
- Chlorotettix tunicatus Ball, 1900
- Chlorotettix unicolor (Fitch, 1851)
- Chlorotettix vacuna Crumb, 1915
- Chlorotettix vacunus Crumb, 1915
- Chlorotettix valenciai Linnavuori, 1973
- Chlorotettix venosus DeLong, 1945
- Chlorotettix virgus Linnavuori & DeLong, 1979
- Chlorotettix viridius Van Duzee, 1892
- Chlorotettix vittatus Osborn, 1909
