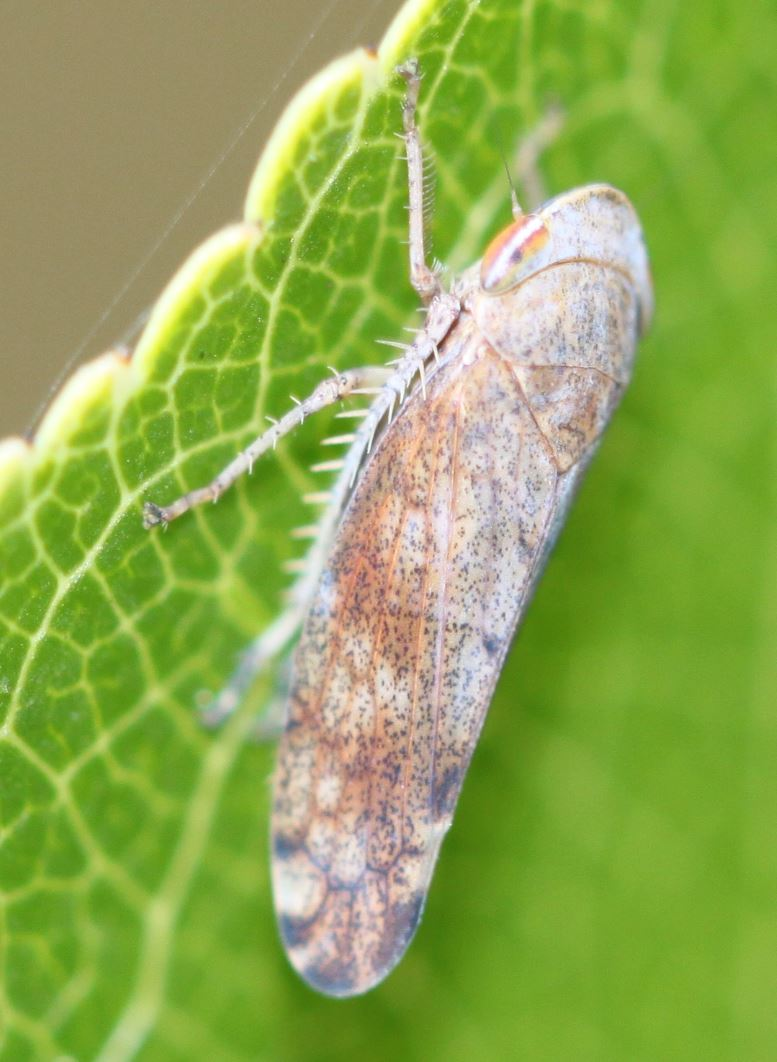

Scientific classification
- Domain: Eukaryota
- Kingdom: Animalia
- Phylum: Arthropoda
- Class: Insecta
- Order: Hemiptera
- Suborder: Auchenorrhyncha
- Family: Cicadellidae
- Genus: Fieberiella
- Species: F. florii

Binomial name
- Fieberiella florii (Stal, 1864)

Synonyms
- Selenocephalus florii Stal, 1864

= Fieberiella florii =

Species of true bug

Fieberiella florii, known generally as privet leafhopper, is a species of leafhopper in the family Cicadellidae. Other common names include the Flor's leafhopper and cherry leafhopper. It is native to Europe and has been established in the United States and Canada.

Fieberiella florii nymph leafhopper

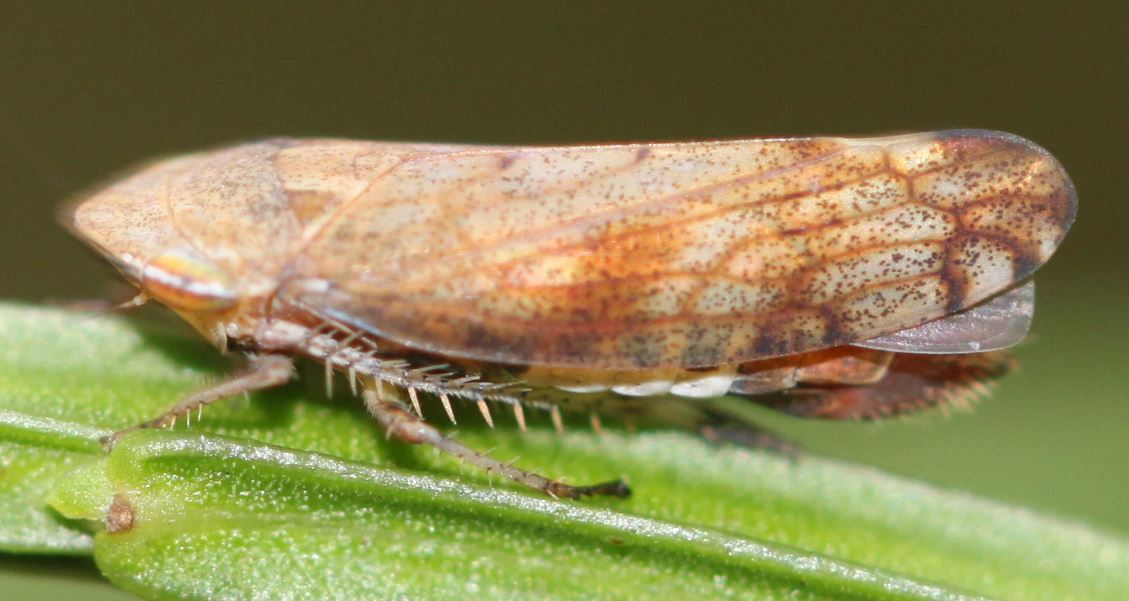
Privet leafhopper, Fieberiella florii
