= Αr14 RNA =

αr14 is a family of bacterial small non-coding RNAs with representatives in a broad group of α-proteobacteria. The first member of this family (Smr14C2) was found in a Sinorhizobium meliloti 1021 locus located in the chromosome (C). It was later renamed NfeR1 (Nodule Formation Efficiency RNA) and shown to be highly expressed in salt stress and during the symbiotic interaction on legume roots. Further homology and structure conservation analysis identified 2 other chromosomal copies and 3 plasmidic ones. Moreover, full-length Smr14C homologs have been identified in several nitrogen-fixing symbiotic rhizobia (i.e. R. leguminosarum bv.viciae, R. leguminosarum bv. trifolii, R. etli, and several Mesorhizobium species), in the plant pathogens belonging to Agrobacterium species (i.e. A. tumefaciens, A. vitis, A. radiobacter, and Agrobacterium H13) as well as in a broad spectrum of Brucella species (B. ovis, B. canis, B. abortus and B. microtis, and several biovars of B. melitensis). αr14C RNA species are 115-125 nt long (Table 1) and share a well defined common secondary structure (Figure 1). Most of the αr14 transcripts can be catalogued as trans-acting sRNAs expressed from well-defined promoter regions of independent transcription units within intergenic regions (IGRs) of the α-proteobacterial genomes (Figure 5).

Table 1: αr14 homologs in other symbionts and pathogens
CM model	Name	GI accession number	begin	end	strand	%GC	length	Organism
αr14	Smr14C1	gi|15963753|ref|NC_003047.1|	206862	206980	-	63	119	Sinorhizobium meliloti 1021
αr14	Smr14C2	gi|15963753|ref|NC_003047.1|	1667491	1667613	-	65	123	Sinorhizobium meliloti 1021
αr14	Smr14C3	gi|15963753|ref|NC_003047.1|	1667769	1667891	-	62	123	Sinorhizobium meliloti 1021
αr14	Smr14A1	gi|16262453|ref|NC_003037.1|	1220690	1220808	+	62	119	Sinorhizobium meliloti 1021 plasmid pSymA
αr14	Smr14A2	gi|16262453|ref|NC_003037.1|	1328176	1328301	-	60	126	Sinorhizobium meliloti 1021 plasmid pSymA
αr14	Smr14B	gi|16263748|ref|NC_003078.1|	1605826	1605943	+	64	118	Sinorhizobium meliloti 1021 plasmid pSymB
αr14	Smedr14C1	gi|150395228|ref|NC_009636.1|	1258038	1258160	-	63	123	Sinorhizobium medicae WSM419 chromosome
αr14	Smedr14C2	gi|150395228|ref|NC_009636.1|	1258311	1258431	-	65	121	Sinorhizobium medicae WSM419 chromosome
αr14	Smedr14C3	gi|150395228|ref|NC_009636.1|	3590299	3590417	-	63	119	Sinorhizobium medicae WSM419 chromosome
αr14	Smedr14p01	gi|150375726|ref|NC_009620.1|	679043	679160	-	66	118	Sinorhizobium medicae WSM419 plasmid pSMED01
αr14	Smedr14p021	gi|150377168|ref|NC_009621.1|	316304	316428	+	64	125	Sinorhizobium medicae WSM419 plasmid pSMED02
αr14	Smedr14p022	gi|150377168|ref|NC_009622.1|	338866	338990	+	63	125	Sinorhizobium medicae WSM419 plasmid pSMED02
αr14	Sfr14C1	gi|227820587|ref|NC_012587.1|	1434171	1434293	-	64	123	Sinorhizobium fredii NGR234 chromosome
αr14	Sfr14C2	gi|227820587|ref|NC_012587.1|	1434463	1434586	-	60	124	Sinorhizobium fredii NGR234 chromosome
αr14	Sfr14C3	gi|227820587|ref|NC_012587.1|	3720579	3720700	+	66	122	Sinorhizobium fredii NGR234 chromosome
αr14	Sfr14b	gi|227818258|ref|NC_012586.1|	2205311	2205428	+	64	118	Sinorhizobium fredii NGR234 plasmid pNGR234b
αr14	Atr14C1	gi|159184118|ref|NC_003062.2|	109473	109601	+	59	129	Agrobacterium tumefaciens str. C58 chromosome circular
αr14	Atr14C2	gi|159185562|ref|NC_003063.2|	1230297	1230426	+	60	130	Agrobacterium tumefaciens str. C58 chromosome linear
αr14	Atr14C3	gi|159185562|ref|NC_003063.2|	1831483	1831614	+	57	132	Agrobacterium tumefaciens str. C58 chromosome linear
αr14	AH13r14C1	gi|325291453|ref|NC_015183.1|	109372	109501	+	58	130	Agrobacterium sp. H13-3 chromosome
αr14	ReCIATr14C1	gi|190889639|ref|NC_010994.1|	513993	514114	+	60	122	Rhizobium etli CIAT 652
αr14	ReCIATr14C2	gi|190889639|ref|NC_010994.1|	1173512	1173639	+	59	128	Rhizobium etli CIAT 652
αr14	ReCIATr14C3	gi|190889639|ref|NC_010994.1|	1912478	1912597	-	64	120	Rhizobium etli CIAT 652
αr14	ReCIATr14C4	gi|190889639|ref|NC_010994.1|	4444894	4445016	-	55	123	Rhizobium etli CIAT 652
αr14	ReCIATr14A	gi|190895317|ref|NC_010998.1|	345900	346021	-	63	122	Rhizobium etli CIAT 652 plasmid pA
αr14	ReCIATr14B	gi|190893983|ref|NC_010996.1|	112292	112425	+	61	134	Rhizobium etli CIAT 652 plasmid pB
αr14	Arr14CI1	gi|222084201|ref|NC_011985.1|	597903	598030	+	61	128	Agrobacterium radiobacter K84 chromosome 1
αr14	Arr14CI2	gi|222084201|ref|NC_011985.1|	1693278	1693409	-	60	132	Agrobacterium radiobacter K84 chromosome 1
αr14	Arr14CI3	gi|222084201|ref|NC_011985.1|	3945511	3945639	-	59	129	Agrobacterium radiobacter K84 chromosome 1
αr14	Arr14CII1	gi|222080781|ref|NC_011983.1|	957687	957817	+	58	131	Agrobacterium radiobacter K84 chromosome 2
αr14	Arr14CII2	gi|222080781|ref|NC_011983.1|	1921110	1921242	-	61	133	Agrobacterium radiobacter K84 chromosome 2
αr14	Arr14Atc	gi|222101962|ref|NC_011987.1|	138495	138625	-	60	131	Agrobacterium radiobacter K84 plasmid pAtK84c
αr14	Rlt2304r14C1	gi|209547612|ref|NC_011369.1|	98050	98171	+	60	122	Rhizobium leguminosarum bv. trifolii WSM2304 chromosome
αr14	Rlt2304r14C2	gi|209547612|ref|NC_011369.1|	1534501	1534621	-	63	121	Rhizobium leguminosarum bv. trifolii WSM2304 chromosome
αr14	Rlt2304r14C3	gi|209547612|ref|NC_011369.1|	4019326	4019446	-	57	121	Rhizobium leguminosarum bv. trifolii WSM2304 chromosome
αr14	Rlt2304r14p011	gi|209546450|ref|NC_011368.1|	306339	306454	-	70	116	Rhizobium leguminosarum bv trifolii WSM2304 plasmid pRLG201
αr14	Rlt2304r14p012	gi|209546450|ref|NC_011368.1|	607636	607759	+	62	124	Rhizobium leguminosarum bv trifolii WSM2304 plasmid pRLG201
αr14	Rlt2304r14p02	gi|209545999|ref|NC_011366.1|	50814	50936	+	63	123	Rhizobium leguminosarum bv trifolii WSM2304 plasmid pRLG202
αr14	Avr14CI1	gi|222147015|ref|NC_011989.1|	115126	115257	+	58	132	Agrobacterium vitis S4 chromosome 1
αr14	Avr14CI2	gi|222147015|ref|NC_011989.1|	2043913	2044044	-	64	132	Agrobacterium vitis S4 chromosome 1
αr14	Avr14CI3	gi|222147015|ref|NC_011989.1|	2793803	2793939	+	63	137	Agrobacterium vitis S4 chromosome 1
αr14	Avr14CII1	gi|222106127|ref|NC_011988.1|	598426	598556	+	62	131	Agrobacterium vitis S4 chromosome 2
αr14	Avr14CII2	gi|222106127|ref|NC_011988.1|	901035	901159	-	63	125	Agrobacterium vitis S4 chromosome 2
αr14	Avr14Atc	gi|222083145|ref|NC_011984.1|	7318	7444	+	61	127	Agrobacterium vitis S4 plasmid pAtS4c
αr14	Rlvr14C1	gi|116249766|ref|NC_008380.1|	512658	512779	+	59	122	Rhizobium leguminosarum bv. viciae 3841
αr14	Rlvr14C2	gi|116249766|ref|NC_008380.1|	2174956	2175074	-	65	119	Rhizobium leguminosarum bv. viciae 3841
αr14	Rlvr14C3	gi|116249766|ref|NC_008380.1|	4988030	4988158	-	58	129	Rhizobium leguminosarum bv. viciae 3841
αr14	Rlvr14p11	gi|116255200|ref|NC_008384.1|	574471	574593	-	59	123	Rhizobium leguminosarum bv. viciae 384 plasmid pRL11
αr14	Rlvr14p12	gi|116248676|ref|NC_008378.1|	407202	407316	+	65	115	Rhizobium leguminosarum bv. viciae 384 plasmid pRL12
αr14	Rlt1325r14C1	gi|241202755|ref|NC_012850.1|	107063	107184	+	58	122	Rhizobium leguminosarum bv. trifolii WSM1325
αr14	Rlt1325r14C2	gi|241202755|ref|NC_012850.1|	1697038	1697156	-	63	119	Rhizobium leguminosarum bv. trifolii WSM1325
αr14	Rlt1325r14C3	gi|241202755|ref|NC_012850.1|	4296632	4296749	-	58	118	Rhizobium leguminosarum bv. trifolii WSM1325
αr14	Rlt1325r14p012	gi|241113003|ref|NC_012848.1|	265945	266069	+	62	125	Rhizobium leguminosarum bv. trifolii WSM1325 plasmid pR132501
αr14	Rlt1325r14p011	gi|241113003|ref|NC_012848.1|	112604	112728	+	66	125	Rhizobium leguminosarum bv. trifolii WSM1325 plasmid pR132501
αr14	Rlt1325r14p02	gi|241666492|ref|NC_012858.1|	28646	28767	+	60	122	Rhizobium leguminosarum bv. trifolii WSM1325 plasmid pR132502
αr14	Rlt1325r14p04	gi|241258599|ref|NC_012852.1|	119314	119443	+	59	130	Rhizobium leguminosarum bv. trifolii WSM1325 plasmid pR132504
αr14	Rlt1325r14p05	gi|241554070|ref|NC_012854.1|	2286	2409	-	65	124	Rhizobium leguminosarum bv. trifolii WSM1325 plasmid pR132505
αr14	ReCFNr14C1	gi|86355669|ref|NC_007761.1|	462566	462687	-	58	122	Rhizobium etli CFN 42
αr14	ReCFNr14C2	gi|86355669|ref|NC_007761.1|	1926239	1926358	+	65	120	Rhizobium etli CFN 42
αr14	ReCFNr14C3	gi|86355669|ref|NC_007761.1|	4314384	4314505	+	58	122	Rhizobium etli CFN 42
αr14	ReCFNr14e	gi|86360278|ref|NC_007765.1|	443001	443129	+	64	129	Rhizobium etli CFN 42 plasmid p42e
αr14	ReCFNr14f	gi|86360734|ref|NC_007766.1|	22818	22935	-	64	118	Rhizobium etli CFN 42 plasmid p42f
αr14	ReCFNr14d	gi|89255298|ref|NC_004041.2|	77668	77794	-	61	127	Rhizobium etli CFN 42 symbiotic plasmid p42d
αr14	Mlr14C1	gi|57165207|ref|NC_002678.2|	890582	890702	+	68	121	Mesorhizobium loti MAFF303099 chromosome
αr14	Mlr14C2	gi|57165207|ref|NC_002678.2|	890760	890880	+	64	121	Mesorhizobium loti MAFF303099 chromosome
αr14	Mlr14C3	gi|57165207|ref|NC_002678.2|	890941	891061	+	63	121	Mesorhizobium loti MAFF303099 chromosome
αr14	Mlr14C4	gi|57165207|ref|NC_002678.2|	5350767	5350882	+	65	116	Mesorhizobium loti MAFF303099 chromosome
αr14	Mlr14C5	gi|57165207|ref|NC_002678.2|	6092423	6092540	-	64	118	Mesorhizobium loti MAFF303099 chromosome
αr14	Mcr14C1	gi|319779749|ref|NC_014923.1|	3674843	3674963	-	64	121	Mesorhizobium ciceri biovar biserrulae WSM1271 chromosome
αr14	Mcr14C2	gi|319779749|ref|NC_014923.1|	3675022	3675142	-	67	121	Mesorhizobium ciceri biovar biserrulae WSM1271 chromosome
αr14	Mcr14C3	gi|319779749|ref|NC_014923.1|	3675197	3675318	-	65	122	Mesorhizobium ciceri biovar biserrulae WSM1271 chromosome
αr14	Mcr14C4	gi|319779749|ref|NC_014923.1|	2545673	2545788	+	64	116	Mesorhizobium ciceri biovar biserrulae WSM1271 chromosome
αr14	Mcr14C5	gi|319779749|ref|NC_014923.1|	5265891	5266009	+	63	119	Mesorhizobium ciceri biovar biserrulae WSM1271 chromosome
αr14	Mcr14p01	gi|319777789|ref|NC_014918.1|	241412	241531	-	63	120	Mesorhizobium ciceri biovar biserrulae WSM1271 plasmid pMESCI01
αr14	Bcr14CI1	gi|161617991|ref|NC_010103.1|	338021	338128	+	56	108	Brucella canis ATCC 23365 chromosome I
αr14	Bcr14CI2	gi|161617991|ref|NC_010103.1|	867217	867335	-	60	119	Brucella canis ATCC 23365 chromosome I
αr14	Bs23445r14CI1	gi|163842277|ref|NC_010169.1|	355557	355664	+	57	108	Brucella suis ATCC 23445 chromosome I
αr14	Bs23445r14CI2	gi|163842277|ref|NC_010169.1|	888713	888831	-	60	119	Brucella suis ATCC 23445 chromosome I
αr14	Bm16Mr14CI1	gi|17986284|ref|NC_003317.1|	1116661	1116787	+	59	127	Brucella melitensis bv. 1 str. 16M chromosome
αr14	Bm16Mr14CI2	gi|17986284|ref|NC_003317.1|	1644167	1644273	-	56	107	Brucella melitensis bv. 1 str. 16M chromosome
αr14	BaS19r14CI1	gi|189023268|ref|NC_010742.1|	358310	358417	+	56	108	Brucella abortus S19 chromosome 1
αr14	BaS19r14CI2	gi|189023268|ref|NC_010742.1|	888877	888995	-	59	119	Brucella abortus S19 chromosome 1
αr14	Bm23457r14CI2	gi|225851546|ref|NC_012441.1|	890343	890461	-	59	119	Brucella melitensis ATCC 23457 chromosome I
αr14	Bm23457r14CI1	gi|225851546|ref|NC_012441.1|	358976	359082	+	56	107	Brucella melitensis ATCC 23457 chromosome I
αr14	Bs1330r14CI1	gi|56968325|ref|NC_004310.3|	338032	338139	+	56	108	Brucella suis 1330 chromosome I
αr14	Bs1330r14CI2	gi|56968325|ref|NC_004310.3|	868847	868965	-	60	119	Brucella suis 1330 chromosome I
αr14	Ba19941r14CI1	gi|62288991|ref|NC_006932.1|	359925	360032	+	56	108	Brucella abortus bv. 1 str. 9-941 chromosome I
αr14	Ba19941r14CI2	gi|62288991|ref|NC_006932.1|	890576	890694	-	59	119	Brucella abortus bv. 1 str. 9-941 chromosome I
αr14	Bmar14CI2	gi|82698932|ref|NC_007618.1|	886854	886972	-	59	119	Brucella melitensis biovar Abortus 2308 chromosome I
αr14	Bmar14CI1	gi|82698932|ref|NC_007618.1|	356293	356400	+	56	108	Brucella melitensis biovar Abortus 2308 chromosome I
αr14	Bor14CI1	gi|148558820|ref|NC_009505.1|	359682	359789	+	56	108	Brucella ovis ATCC 25840 chromosome I
αr14	Bor14CI2	gi|148558820|ref|NC_009505.1|	895749	895867	-	60	119	Brucella ovis ATCC 25840 chromosome I
αr14	Bmir14CI1	gi|256368465|ref|NC_013119.1|	339699	339806	+	57	108	Brucella microti CCM 4915 chromosome 1
αr14	Bmir14CI2	gi|256368465|ref|NC_013119.1|	873049	873167	-	60	119	Brucella microti CCM 4915 chromosome 1
αr14	Oar14CII1	gi|153010078|ref|NC_009668.1|	274684	274807	+	55	124	Brucella anthropi ATCC 49188 chromosome 2
αr14	Oar14CII2	gi|153010078|ref|NC_009668.1|	1275649	1275772	+	58	124	Brucella anthropi ATCC 49188 chromosome 2
αr14	Oar14CI1	gi|153007346|ref|NC_009667.1|	448505	448614	+	58	110	Brucella anthropi ATCC 49188 chromosome 1
αr14	Oar14CI2	gi|153007346|ref|NC_009667.1|	2453973	2454100	+	56	128	Brucella anthropi ATCC 49188 chromosome 1
αr14	MsBCNr14C1	gi|110632362|ref|NC_008254.1|	1916694	1916817	+	60	124	Mesorhizobium sp. BNC1
αr14	MsBCNr14C2	gi|110632362|ref|NC_008254.1|	3977086	3977208	-	60	123	Mesorhizobium sp. BNC1
αr14	MsBCNr14p1	gi|110346917|ref|NC_008242.1|	135270	135386	-	66	117	Mesorhizobium sp. BNC1 plasmid 1

== Discovery and structure ==
Smr14C2 sRNA was described by del Val et al., as a result of a computational comparative genomic approach consisting in the integration of complementary strategies, designed to search for novel sRNA-encoding genes in the intergenic regions (IGRs) of the reference S. meliloti 1021 strain (http://iant.toulouse.inra.fr/bacteria/annotation/cgi/rhime.cgi) . Northern hybridization experiments confirmed that the predicted smr14C2 locus did express a single transcript of the expected size, which accumulated differentially in free-living and endosymbiotic bacteria. TAP-based 5′-RACE experiments mapped the transcription start site (TSS) of the full-length Smr14C transcript to the 1,667,613 nt position in the S. meliloti 1021 genome (http://iant.toulouse.inra.fr/bacteria/annotation/cgi/rhime.cgi) whereas the 3′-end was assumed to be located at the 1,667,491 nt position matching the last residue of the consecutive stretch of Us of a bona fide Rho-independent terminator (Figure 5). Parallel and later studies in which Smr14C2 transcript is referred to as sra38 or Sm7', independently confirmed the expression this sRNA in S. melilloti and in its closely related strain 2011. Recent deep sequencing-based characterization of the small RNA fraction (50-350 nt) of S. meliloti 2011 further confirmed the expression of Smr14C2 (here referred to as SmelC397), and mapped the 5′- and 3′-ends of the full-length transcript to the same position in the S. meliloti 1021 genome.

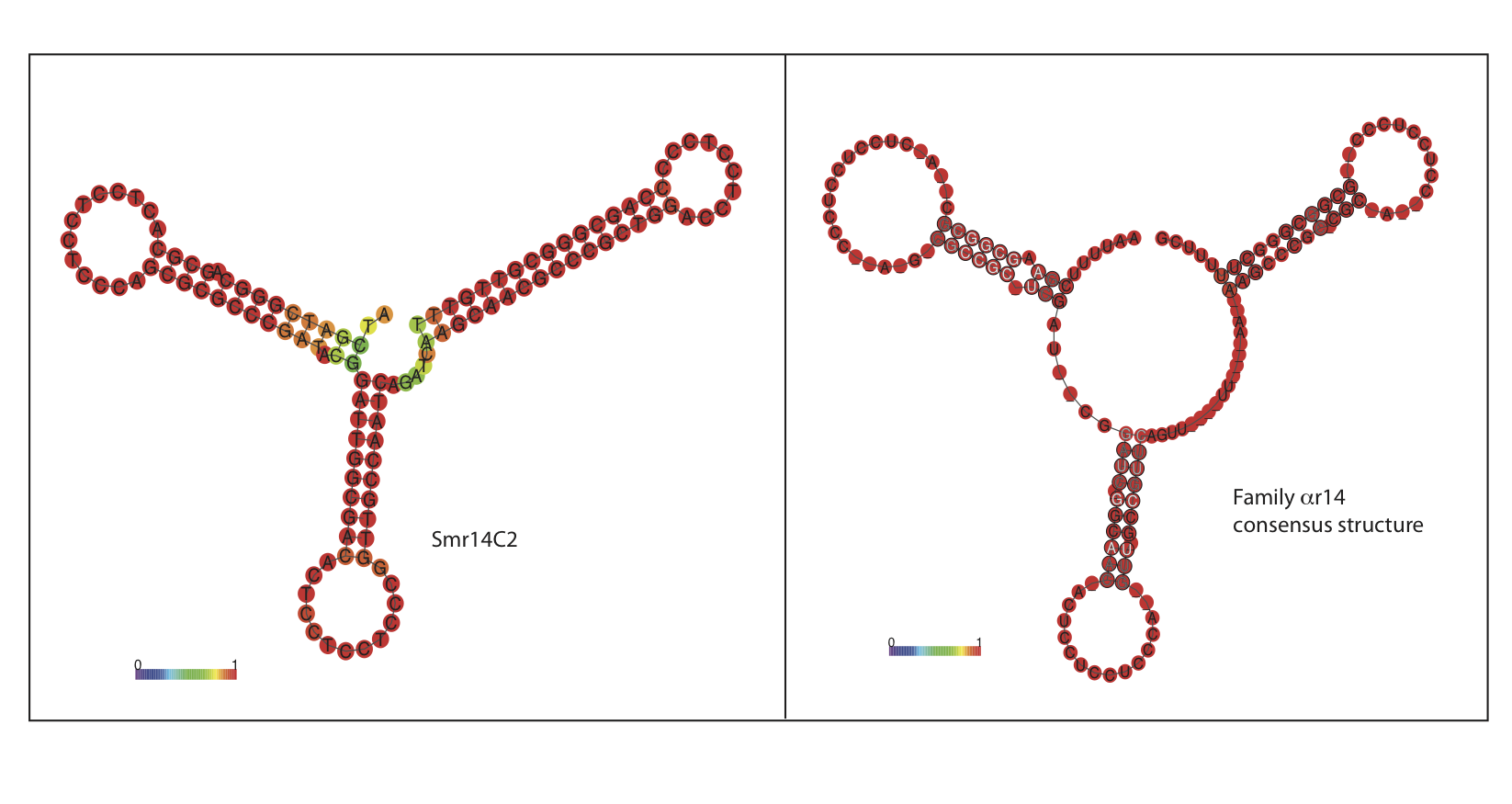
Figure 1: Consensus secondary structure of Smr14C2 and the ar14 family predicted by RNA and RNAalifold. The color scheme represent the base pair probabilities.

The nucleotide sequence of Smr14C2 was initially used as query to search against the Rfam database (version 10.0;https://www.sanger.ac.uk/Software/Rfam). This homology search rendered no matches to known bacterial sRNA in this database. Smr14C2 was next BLASTed with default parameters against all the currently available bacterial genomes (1,615 sequences at 20 April 2011; https://www.ncbi.nlm.nih.gov;). The regions exhibiting significant homology to the query sequence (78-89% similarity) were extracted to create a Covariance Model (CM) from a seed alignment using Infernal (version1.0) (Figure 2). This CM was used in a further search for new members of the αr9 family in the existing bacterial genomic databases and resumed in the following Table 2:

Table 2: Number of copies
Organism	Nr. of αr14 chromosomal homologs	Nr. of αr14 plasmids homologs	Total nr Nr. of αr14 copies
Sinorhizobium meliloti 1021	3	3	6
Sinorhizobium medicae WSM419	3	3	6
Sinorhizobium fredii NGR234	3	3	6
Rhizobium etli CIAT 652	3	3	6
Rhizobium etli CFN 42	3	3	6
Rhizobium leguminosarum bv. trifolii WSM2304	3	2	5
Rhizobium leguminosarum bv. trifolii WSM1325	3	5	8
Rhizobium leguminosarum bv. viciae 3841	4	2	6
Agrobacterium sp. H13-3	2		
Agrobacterium vitis S4	3 CI / 2 CII	1	6
Agrobacterium radiobacter K84	3 CI / 2 CII	1	6
Agrobacterium tumefaciens str. C58	3		3
Brucella suis ATCC 23445	2		2
Brucella microti CCM 4915	2		2
Brucella ovis ATCC 25840	2		2
Brucella canis ATCC 23365	2		2
Brucella melitensis ATCC 23457	2		2
Brucella abortus S19	2		2
Brucella abortus bv 1 str 9-941	2		2
Brucella melitensis biovar Abortus 2308	2		2
Brucella suis 1330	2		2
Mesorhizobium loti MAFF303099	5		5
Mesorhizobium sp. BNC1	2	1	3
Mesorhizobium ciceri biovar biserrulae WSM127	4	1	5
Brucella anthropi ATCC 49188	2 CI / 2 CII		4

The results were manually inspected to deduce a consensus secondary structure for the family (Figure 1 and Figure 2). The consensus structure was also independently predicted with the program locARNATE with very similar predictions. The manual inspection of the sequences found with the CM using Infernal allowed finding 101 homolog sequences. The rhizobial species encoding the 36 closer homologs to Smr14C2 were: S. medicae and S. fredii, two R. leguminosarum trifolii strains (WSM2304 and WSM1325), two R. etli strains CFN 42 and CIAT 652, the reference R. leguminosarum bv. viciae 3841 strain, and the Agrobacterium species A. vitis,A. tumefaciens, A. radiobacter and A. H13. All these sequences showed significant Infernal E-values (5.63E-29 - 8.16E-18) and bit-scores. The rest of the sequences found with the model showed high E-values between (1.33E-17 and 8.79E-03) but lower bit-scores and are encoded by Brucella species (B. ovis, B. canis, B. abortus, B. microtis, and several biobars of B. melitensis), Brucella anthropi and the Mesorhizobum species loti, M. ciceri and M. BNC.

The model identified five additional copies in the S. meliloti genome, locating two of them in tandem in the same IGR (Smr14C2, Smr14C3). The same results were obtained for S. medicae (Smedr14C1, Smedr14C2), S. fredii (Sfr14C1, Sfr14C2), M. loti (Mlr14C1, Mlr14C2) and M. ciceri (Mcr14C1, Mcr14C2).

Concerning the additional copies found in the S. meliloti genome, the expression of four out of the five copies have been independently confirmed in recent studies:

- Smr14C3 referred as: sra38, Sm7 or SmelC398
- Smr14A1 referred as: sma8 or SmelA075
- Smr14A2 referred as: SmelA099
- Smr14B referred as: SmelB161

There are no experimental evidences up to now for the predicted copy Smr14C1.

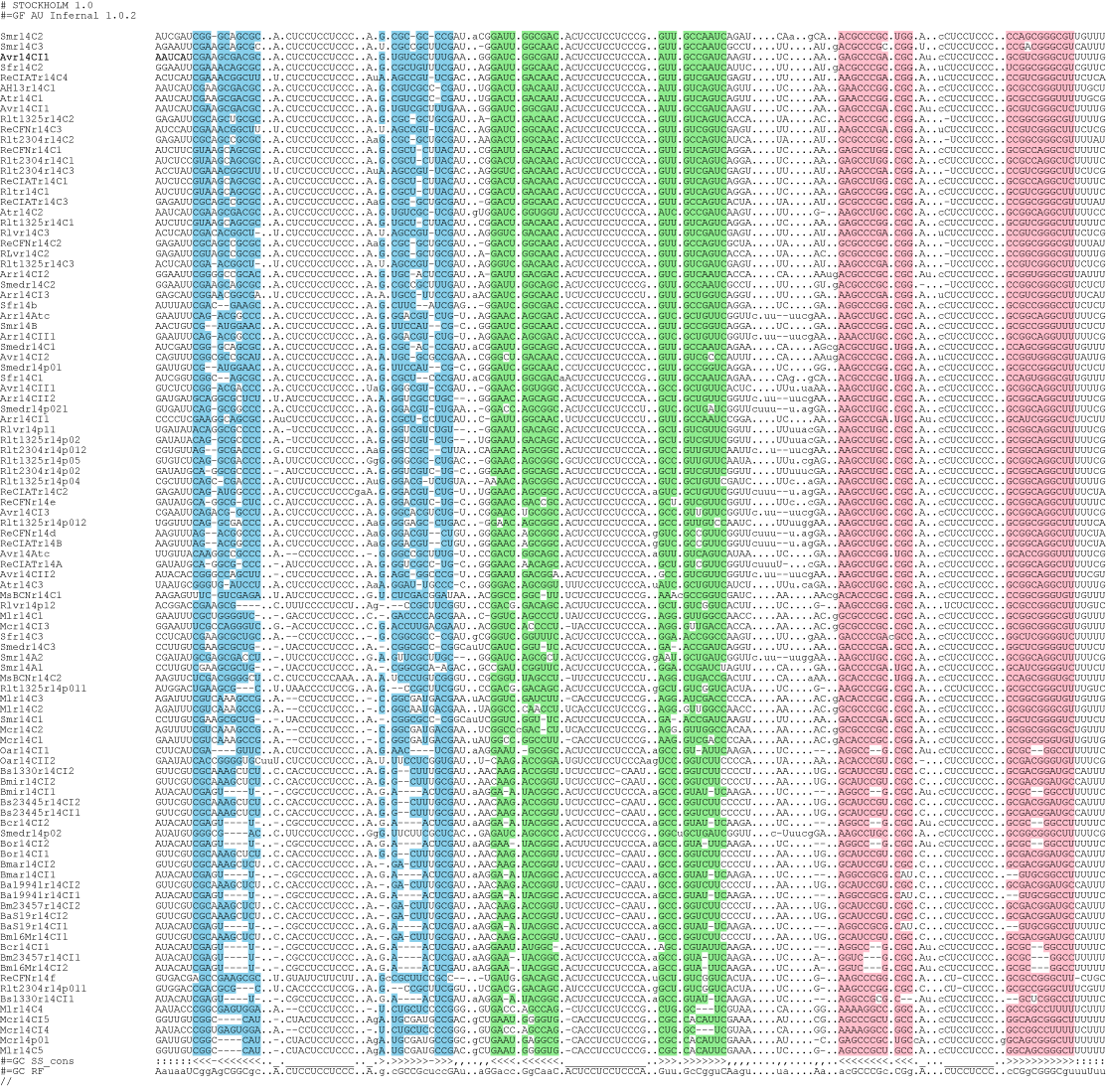
Figure 2: Covariance Model in stockholm format showing the consensus structure for the αr15 family. Each of the stems represented by the structure line #=GC SS_cons is in a different color, corresponding the red one to the rho independent terminator stem. Covariance Model in stockholm format can be downloaded here.

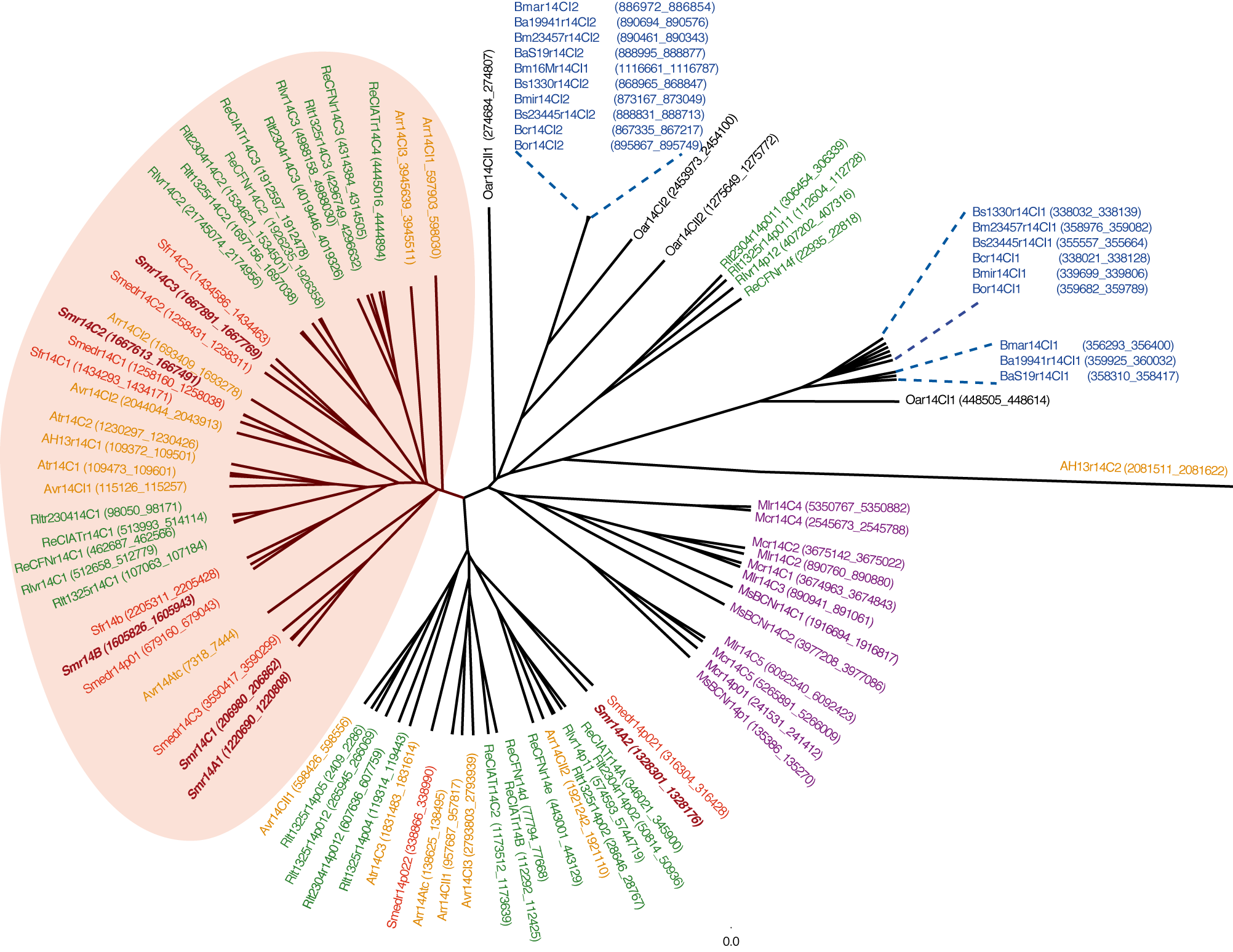
Figure 3: Phylogenetic distribution of known and predicted αr14 genes. Gene numbers are based on computational analysis using the program Infernal. Shadowed in red are the closer homologs with high Infernal E-values and bit scores. Legend: αr14_Smr14C2 = Sinorhizobium meliloti 1021 (NC_003047) (NC_010994), αr14_Smr14C3 = Sinorhizobium meliloti 1021 (NC_003047) (NC_011985), αr14_Smedr14C1 = Sinorhizobium medicae WSM419 chromosome (NC_009636) (NC_011983), αr14_Smedr14C2 = Sinorhizobium medicae WSM419 chromosome (NC_009636) (NC_011369), αr14_ReCIATr14C3 = Rhizobium etli CIAT 652 (NC_010994) (NC_012850), αr14_Atr14C2 = Agrobacterium tumefaciens str. C58 chromosome linear (NC_003063) (NC_007761), αr14_Rlt1325r14C2 = Rhizobium leguminosarum bv. trifolii WSM1325 (NC_012850) (NC_012441), αr14_ReCFNr14C2 = Rhizobium etli CFN 42 (NC_007761) (NC_010994), αr14_Rlt2304r14C2 = Rhizobium leguminosarum bv. trifolii WSM2304 chromosome (NC_011369) (NC_011985), αr14_AH13r14C1 = Agrobacterium sp. H13-3 chromosome (NC_015183) (NC_011983), αr14_Sfr14C2 = Sinorhizobium fredii NGR234 chromosome (NC_012587) (NC_011369), αr14_Sfr14C1 = Sinorhizobium fredii NGR234 chromosome (NC_012587) (NC_012850), αr14_Rlt2304r14C1 = Rhizobium leguminosarum bv. trifolii WSM2304 chromosome (NC_011369) (NC_007761), αr14_Atr14C1 = Agrobacterium tumefaciens str. C58 chromosome circular (NC_003062) (NC_012441), αr14_ReCIATr14C1 = Rhizobium etli CIAT 652 (NC_010994) (NC_010994), αr14_Rlvr14C1 = Rhizobium leguminosarum bv. viciae 3841 (NC_008380) (NC_011985), αr14_ReCFNr14C1 = Rhizobium etli CFN 42 (NC_007761) (NC_011983), αr14_Avr14CI1 = Agrobacterium vitis S4 chromosome 1 chromosome 1 (NC_011989) (NC_011369), αr14_Arr14CI2 = Agrobacterium radiobacter K84 chromosome 1 (NC_011985) (NC_012850), αr14_ReCIATr14C4 = Rhizobium etli CIAT 652 (NC_010994) (NC_007761), αr14_Rlt1325r14C1 = Rhizobium leguminosarum bv. trifolii WSM1325 (NC_012850) (NC_012441), αr14_Avr14CI2 = Agrobacterium vitis S4 chromosome 1 chromosome 1 (NC_011989) (NC_010994), αr14_Sfr14b = Sinorhizobium fredii NGR234 plasmid pNGR234b (NC_012586) (NC_011985), αr14_Arr14CI3 = Agrobacterium radiobacter K84 chromosome 1 (NC_011985) (NC_011983), αr14_ReCFNr14C3 = Rhizobium etli CFN 42 (NC_007761) (NC_011369), αr14_Rlt1325r14C3 = Rhizobium leguminosarum bv. trifolii WSM1325 (NC_012850) (NC_012850), αr14_Rlvr14C3 = Rhizobium leguminosarum bv. viciae 3841 (NC_008380) (NC_007761), αr14_Rlt2304r14C3 = Rhizobium leguminosarum bv. trifolii WSM2304 chromosome (NC_011369) (NC_012441), αr14_Arr14Atc = Agrobacterium radiobacter K84 plasmid pAtK84c (NC_011987) (NC_010994), αr14_Arr14CII1 = Agrobacterium radiobacter K84 chromosome 2 (NC_011983) (NC_011985), αr14_Smr14B = Sinorhizobium meliloti 1021 plasmid pSymB (NC_003078) (NC_011983), αr14_Avr14CII1 = Agrobacterium vitis S4 chromosome 2 (NC_011988) (NC_011369), αr14_Smedr14p01 = Sinorhizobium medicae WSM419 plasmid pSMED01 (NC_009620) (NC_012850), αr14_Rlt1325r14p05 = Rhizobium leguminosarum bv. trifolii WSM1325 plasmid pR132505 (NC_012854) (NC_007761), αr14_Rlt1325r14p02 = Rhizobium leguminosarum bv. trifolii WSM1325 plasmid pR132502(NC_012858) (NC_012441), αr14_Smedr14p022 = Sinorhizobium medicae WSM419 plasmid pSMED02 (NC_009621) (NC_010994), αr14_Rlvr14p11 = Rhizobium leguminosarum bv. viciae 3841 plasmid pRL11 (NC_008384) (NC_011985), αr14_Arr14CII2 = Agrobacterium radiobacter K84 chromosome 2 (NC_011983) (NC_011983), αr14_Arr14CI1 = Agrobacterium radiobacter K84 chromosome 1 (NC_011985) (NC_011369), αr14_ReCFNr14e = Rhizobium etli CFN 42 plasmid p42e (NC_007765) (NC_012850), αr14_Rlt1325r14p012 = Rhizobium leguminosarum bv. trifolii WSM1325 plasmid pR132501 (NC_012848) (NC_007761), αr14_Rlt2304r14p02 = Rhizobium leguminosarum bv. trifolii WSM2304 plasmid pR132501 (NC_011366) (NC_012441), αr14_Rlt2304r14p012 = Rhizobium leguminosarum bv. trifolii WSM2304 plasmid pR132501 (NC_011368) (NC_010994), αr14_Rlt1325r14p04 = Rhizobium leguminosarum bv. trifolii WSM1325 plasmid pR132504 (NC_012852) (NC_011985), αr14_Avr14CI3 = Agrobacterium vitis S4 chromosome 1 (NC_011989) (NC_011983), αr14_ReCIATr14A = Rhizobium etli CIAT 652 plasmid pA (NC_010998) (NC_011369), αr14_MsBCNr14C1 = Mesorhizobium sp. BNC1 (NC_008254) (NC_012850), αr14_Avr14CII2 = Agrobacterium vitis S4 chromosome 2 (NC_011988) (NC_007761), αr14_Avr14Atc = Agrobacterium vitis S4 plasmid pAtS4c (NC_011984) (NC_012441), αr14_ReCIATr14C2 = Rhizobium etli CIAT 652 (NC_010994) (NC_010994), αr14_Atr14C3 = Agrobacterium tumefaciens str. C58 chromosome linear (NC_003063) (NC_011985), αr14_ReCIATr14B = Rhizobium etli CIAT 652 plasmid pB (NC_010996) (NC_011983), αr14_ReCFNr14d = Rhizobium etli CFN 42 symbiotic plasmid p42d (NC_004041) (NC_011369), αr14_Sfr14C3 = Sinorhizobium fredii NGR234 chromosome (NC_012587) (NC_012850), αr14_Smedr14C3 = Sinorhizobium medicae WSM419 chromosome (NC_009636) (NC_007761), αr14_Smr14C1 = Sinorhizobium meliloti 1021 (NC_003047) (NC_012441), αr14_Mlr14C1 = Mesorhizobium loti MAFF303099 chromosome (NC_002678) (NC_010994), αr14_Mlr14C2 = Mesorhizobium loti MAFF303099 chromosome (NC_002678) (NC_011985), αr14_Smr14A1 = Sinorhizobium meliloti 1021 plasmid pSymA (NC_003037) (NC_011983), αr14_Rlvr14p12 = Rhizobium leguminosarum bv. viciae 3841 plasmid pRL12 (NC_008378) (NC_011369), αr14_Mcr14C1 = Mesorhizobium ciceri biovar biserrulae WSM1271 chromosome (NC_014923) (NC_012850), αr14_Mcr14C2 = Mesorhizobium ciceri biovar biserrulae WSM1271 chromosome (NC_014923) (NC_007761), αr14_Oar14CI1 = Brucella anthropi ATCC 49188 chromosome 1 (NC_009667) (NC_012441), αr14_Oar14CII1 = Brucella anthropi ATCC 49188 chromosome 2 (NC_009668) (NC_010994), αr14_Smr14A2 = Sinorhizobium meliloti 1021 plasmid pSymA (NC_003037) (NC_011985), αr14_Oar14CI2 = Brucella anthropi ATCC 49188 chromosome 1 (NC_009667) (NC_011983), αr14_Rlt1325r14p011 = Rhizobium leguminosarum bv. trifolii WSM1325 plasmid pR132501 (NC_012848) (NC_011369), αr14_MsBCNr14C2 = Mesorhizobium sp. BNC1 (NC_008254) (NC_012850), αr14_Bs23445r14CI1 = Brucella suis ATCC 23445 chromosome I (NC_010169) (NC_007761), αr14_Bmir14CI1 = Brucella microti CCM 4915 chromosome I (NC_013119) (NC_012441), αr14_Bor14CI1 = Brucella ovis ATCC 25840 chromosome I (NC_009505) (NC_010994), αr14_Bcr14CI1 = Brucella canis ATCC 23365 chromosome I (NC_010103) (NC_011985), αr14_Bm23457r14CI1 = Brucella melitensis ATCC 23457 chromosome I (NC_012441) (NC_011983), αr14_BaS19r14CI1 = Brucella abortus S19 chromosome I (NC_010742) (NC_011369), αr14_Ba19941r14CI1 = Brucella abortus bv. 1 str. 9-941 chromosome I (NC_006932) (NC_012850), αr14_Bmar14CI1 = Brucella melitensis biovar Abortus 2308 chromosome I (NC_007618) (NC_007761), αr14_Bs1330r14CI1 = Brucella suis 1330 chromosome I (NC_004310) (NC_012441), αr14_Smedr14p021 = Sinorhizobium medicae WSM419 plasmid pSMED02 (NC_009621) (NC_010994), αr14_ReCFNr14f = Rhizobium etli CFN 42 plasmid p42f (NC_007766) (NC_011985), αr14_Oar14CII2 = Brucella anthropi ATCC 49188 chromosome 2 (NC_009668) (NC_011983), αr14_Rlt2304r14p011 = Rhizobium leguminosarum bv. trifolii WSM2304 plasmid pRLG201 (NC_011368) (NC_011369), αr14_Mcr14p01 = Mesorhizobium ciceri biovar biserrulae WSM1271 chromosome I (NC_014918) (NC_012850), αr14_Mcr14CI4 = Mesorhizobium ciceri biovar biserrulae WSM1271 chromosome I (NC_014923) (NC_007761), αr14_Mcr14CI5 = Mesorhizobium ciceri biovar biserrulae WSM1271 chromosome I (NC_014923) (NC_012441), αr14_Bor14CI2 = Brucella ovis ATCC 25840 chromosome I (NC_009505) (NC_010994), αr14_Bcr14CI2 = Brucella canis ATCC 23365 chromosome I (NC_010103) (NC_011985), αr14_Bs23445r14CI2 = Brucella suis ATCC 23445 chromosome I (NC_010169) (NC_011983), αr14_Bmir14CI2 = Brucella microti CCM 4915 chromosome 1 (NC_013119) (NC_011369), αr14_Bs1330r14CI2 = Brucella suis 1330 chromosome I (NC_004310) (NC_012850), αr14_Mlr14C5 = Mesorhizobium loti MAFF303099 chromosome (NC_002678) (NC_007761), αr14_Bm16Mr14CI1 = Brucella melitensis bv. 1 str. 16M chromosome (NC_003317) (NC_012441), αr14_BaS19r14CI2 = Brucella abortus S19 chromosome 1 (NC_010742) (NC_010994), αr14_Bm23457r14CI2 = Brucella melitensis ATCC 23457 chromosome I (NC_012441) (NC_011985), αr14_Ba19941r14CI2 = Brucella abortus bv. 1 str. 9-941 chromosome I (NC_006932) (NC_011983), αr14_Bmar14CI2 = Brucella melitensis biovar Abortus 2308 chromosome I (NC_007618) (NC_011369), αr14_MsBCNr14p1 = Mesorhizobium sp. BNC1 plasmid 1 (NC_008242) (NC_012850), αr14_Mlr14C4 = Mesorhizobium loti MAFF303099 chromosome (NC_002678) (NC_007761), αr14_Rlvr14C2 = Rhizobium leguminosarum bv. viciae 3841 (NC_008380) (NC_012441).

== Expression information ==
Parallel studies assessed Smr14C expression in S. meliloti 1021 under different biological conditions; i.e. bacterial growth in TY, minimal medium (MM) and luteolin-MM broth and endosymbiotic bacteria (i.e. mature symbiotic alfalfa nodules) and high salt stress, oxidative stress and cold and hot shock stresses. Expression of Smr14C2 in free-living bacteria was found to be growth-dependent, being the gene strongly down-regulated when bacteria entered the stationary phase. Expression of Smr14C2 increased ~5-fold in nodules when compared with free-living bacteria (log phase TY or MM cultures), suggesting the induction of these sRNAs during bacterial infection and/or bacteroid differentiation. Recent deep sequencing data found differential expression of the plasmic copies. Smr14A1 showed differential expression conditions, with a very low expression level in complex medium and in the same medium at decreased temperature. However, it was strongly up-regulated by heat-shock stress. Smr14B showed an increase of its expression in the stationary phase greater that 8 fold. Moreover, also showed a week upregulation (<8 fold) upon acidic, basic and oxidative stress

== Promoter analysis ==
All the promoter regions of the αr14 family members examined so far are very conserved in a sequence stretch extending up to 120 bp upstream of the transcription start site of the sRNA. All closest homolog loci have recognizable σ70-dependent promoters showing a -35/-10 consensus motif CTTAGAC-n17-CTATAT, which has been previously shown to be widely conserved among several other genera in the α-subgroup of proteobacteria. To identify binding sites for other known transcription factors we used the fasta sequences provided by RegPredict(http://regpredict.lbl.gov/regpredict/help.html), and used those position weight matrices (PSWM) provided by RegulonDB (http://regulondb.ccg.unam.mx). We built PSWM for each transcription factor from the RegPredict sequences using the Consensus/Patser program, choosing the best final matrix for motif lengths between 14 and 30 bps a threshold average E-value < 10E-10 for each matrix was established, (see "Thresholded consensus" in http://gps-tools2.its.yale.edu). Moreover, we searched for conserved unknown motifs using MEME (http://meme.sdsc.edu/meme4_6_1/intro.html) and used relaxed regular expressions (i.e. pattern matching) over all Smr14C2 homologs promoters. This studies revealed two well defined groups of loci, the first one represented by the closest homologs (Figure 5) that presented a 26 bp long region very conserved between positions -40 and -75, marked as conserved MEME motif in (Figure 5), but no significant similarity to known transcription factor binding sites matrices could be established. A group of not so closely related members of the αr14 family constituted the second group of conserved promoters (Figure6). They presented a different promoter region, very well conserved across all members and an additional unknown 20 bp motif.

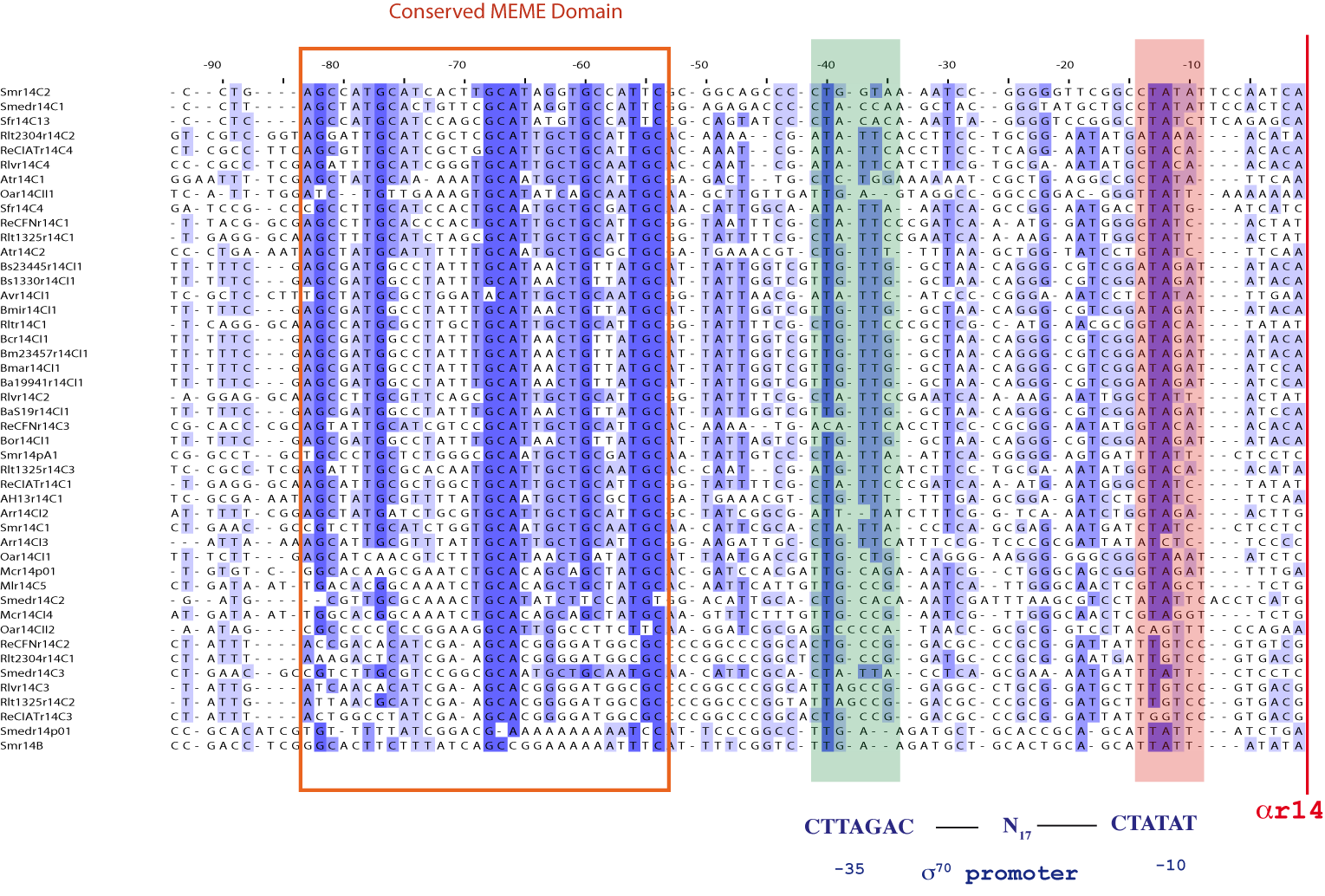
Figure 5: Graphic representation of the αr14 seed members' promoter region. All members presented putative σ70 promoters with -30 and -10 boxes marked in green and red respectively.

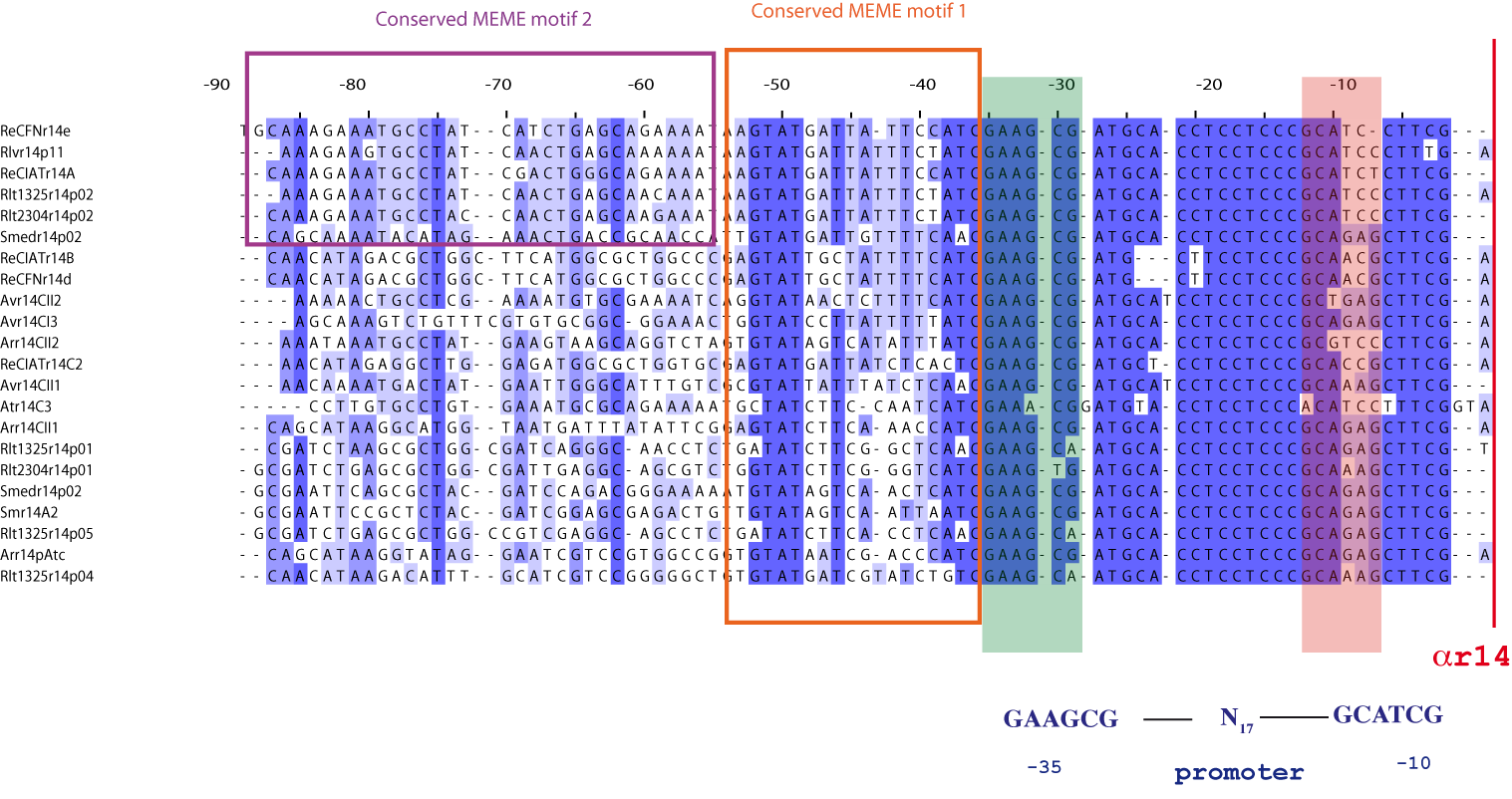
Figure 6: Graphic representation of the αr14 further related members' promoter region.

== Genomic context ==
Most of the members of the αr14 family are trans-encoded sRNAs transcribed from independent promoters in chromosomal IGRs. Many of the neighboring genes of the seed alignment's members were not annotated and thus were further manually curated. The tandem copies in the Sinorhizobium group's genomes (Smr14C2, Smr14C3, Smedr14C1, Smedr14C2, Sfr14C1, Sfr14C2) presented a conserved genomic context. The gene upstream coded for an unknown protein containing the domain DUF1127 and the gene downstream coded for a trigger factor.

Partially conserved genomic context, DUF1127 protein upstream and 5-keto-4-deoxyuronate isomerase downstream, was found for the plasmidic copies of the Rhizobium group Rlt1325r14p02, Rlvr14p11, Rlt2304r14p02, and ReCIATr14A.

A similar case of partial genomic conservation, DUF1127 protein upstream and tRNA (uracil-5-)-methyltransferase downstream, was found in the case of the Mesorhizobium species, which also presented tandem copies M. loti (Mlr14C1, Mlr14C2) and M. ciceri (Mcr14C1, Mcr14C2). The same context was found for the second copy in the chromosome II of Brucella anthropi (Oar14CII2) and the second copy in chromosome I in the Brucella group (Bor14CI2, Bcr14CI2, Bmir14CI2, Bs1330r14CI2, Bm16Mr14CI1, BaS19r14CI2, Bm23457r14CI1, BMEA_A0934, BruAb1_0906, Ba19941r14CI2). In all these cases the sRNAs did appear as single copy in their IGR. Bs23445r14CI2, Bmar14CI2, and Rlvr14C2 shared the gene coding for tRNA (uracil-5-)-methyltransferase downstream, but did not share the genes coding upstream.

The results showed two other well-conserved genomic contexts. One with a gene coding for nicotinic acid mononucleotide adenylyltransferase upstream and a gene coding for a molybdenum ABC transporter downstream, which is shared by the third copy of ar14 family in the A. radiobacter genome (Arr14CI3) and in the Rhizobium group genomes (ReCFNr14C3, Rlt1325r14C3, Rlvr14C3, Rlt2304r14C3). The second group is formed by the first copy in the Chromosome I in the Brucellas genomes that share the gene upstream coding for an LrgB membrane protein and the gene downstream a coding for an alpha/beta hydrolase.

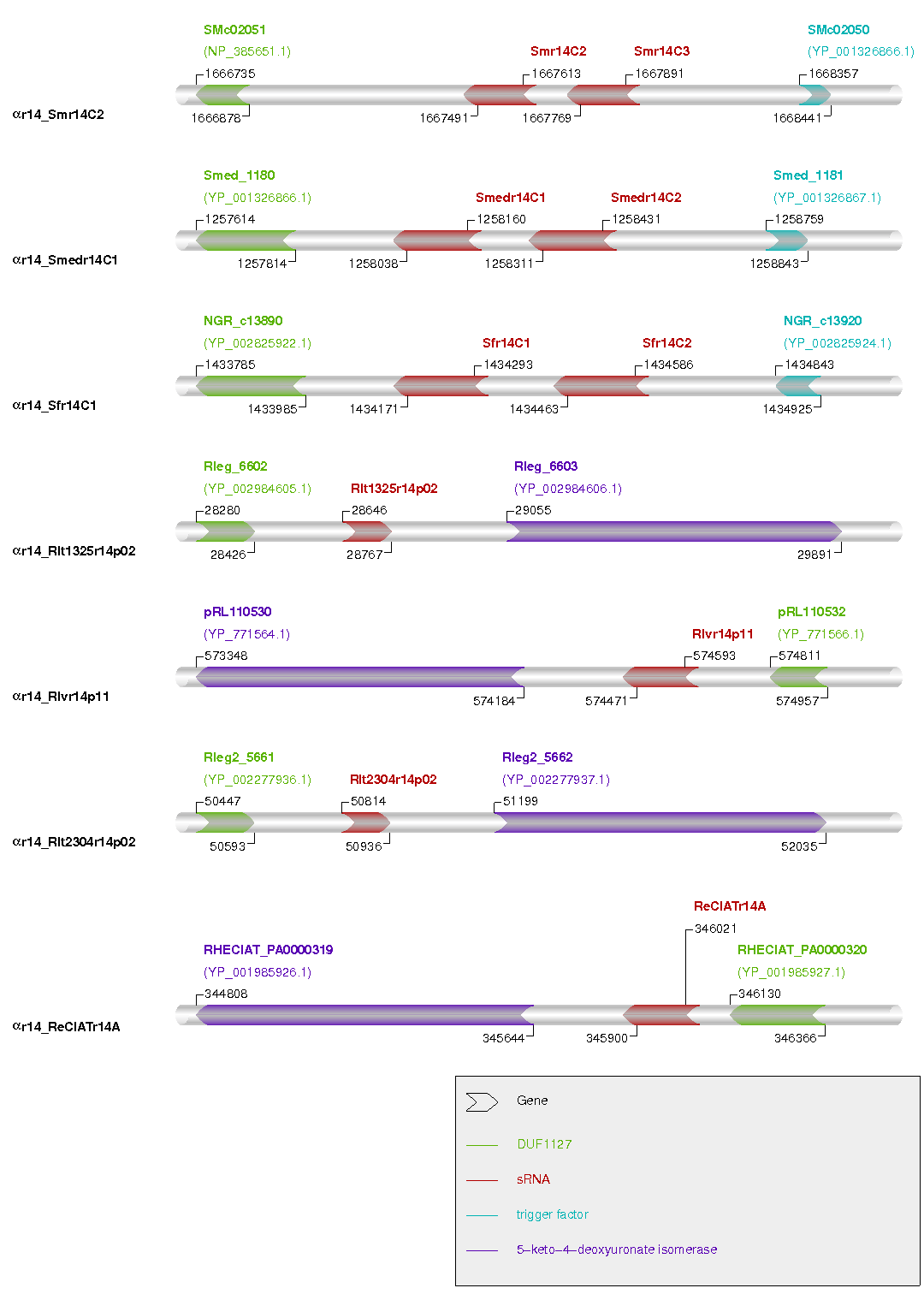
Figure 5: Group I according to the genomic context of the αr14 family.. The αr14 RNA genes are represented by red arrows and the flanking ORFs by arrows on different colors depending on their product function (legend). Numbers indicate the αr14 RNA gene's and flanking ORFs coordinates in each organism genome database. The gene strand is represented with the file direction. On the left of the figure identification names are used which correspond to a certain organism: αr14_Smedr14C1 = Sinorhizobium medicae WSM419 chromosome (NC_009636), αr14_Smr14C2 = Sinorhizobium meliloti 1021 (NC_003047), αr14_Sfr14C1 = Sinorhizobium fredii NGR234 chromosome (NC_012587), αr14_ReCIATr14A = Rhizobium etli CIAT 65 plasmid pA (NC_010998), αr14_Rlt2304r14p02 = Rhizobium leguminosarum bv trifolii WSM2304 plasmid pRLG202 (NC_011366), αr14_Rlvr14p11 = Rhizobium leguminosarum bv viciae 384 plasmid pRL11 (NC_008384), αr14_Rlt1325r14p02 = Rhizobium leguminosarum bv trifolii WSM1325 plasmid pR132502 (NC_012858).

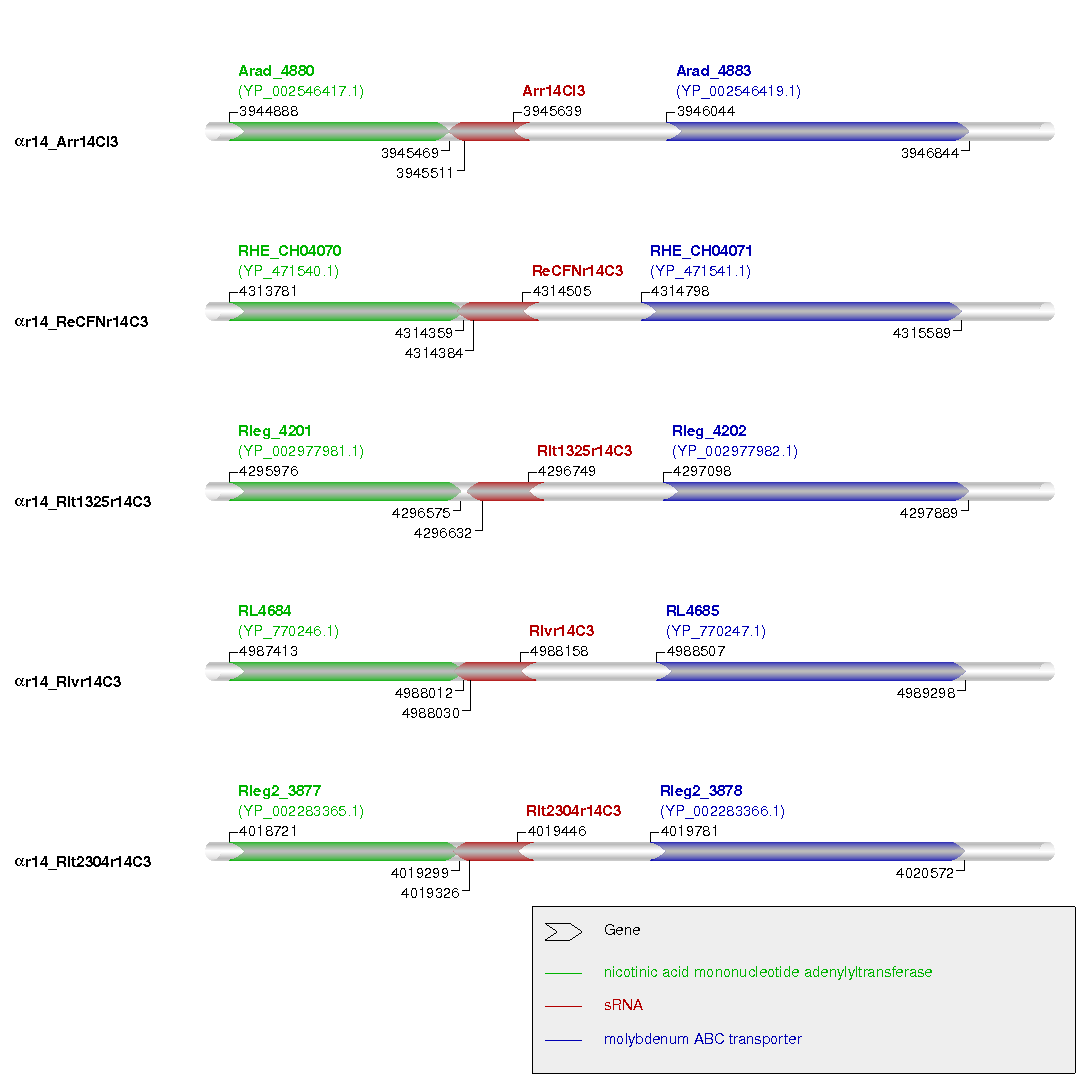
Figure 6: Group II according to the genomic context of the αr14 family.. The αr14 RNA genes are represented by red arrows and the flanking ORFs by arrows on different colors depending on their product function (legend). Numbers indicate the αr14 RNA gene's and flanking ORFs coordinates in each organism genome database. The gene strand is represented with the file direction. On the left of the figure identification names are used which correspond to a certain organism: αr14_Arr14CI3 = Agrobacterium radiobacter K84 chromosome 1 (NC_011985), αr14_Rlt2304r14C3 = Rhizobium leguminosarum bv trifolii WSM2304 (NC_011369), αr14_Rlvr14C3 = Rhizobium leguminosarum bv viciae 3841 (NC_008380), αr14_Rlt1325r14C3 = Rhizobium leguminosarum bv trifolii WSM1325 (NC_012850), αr14_ReCFNr14C3 = Rhizobium etli CFN 42 (NC_007761).

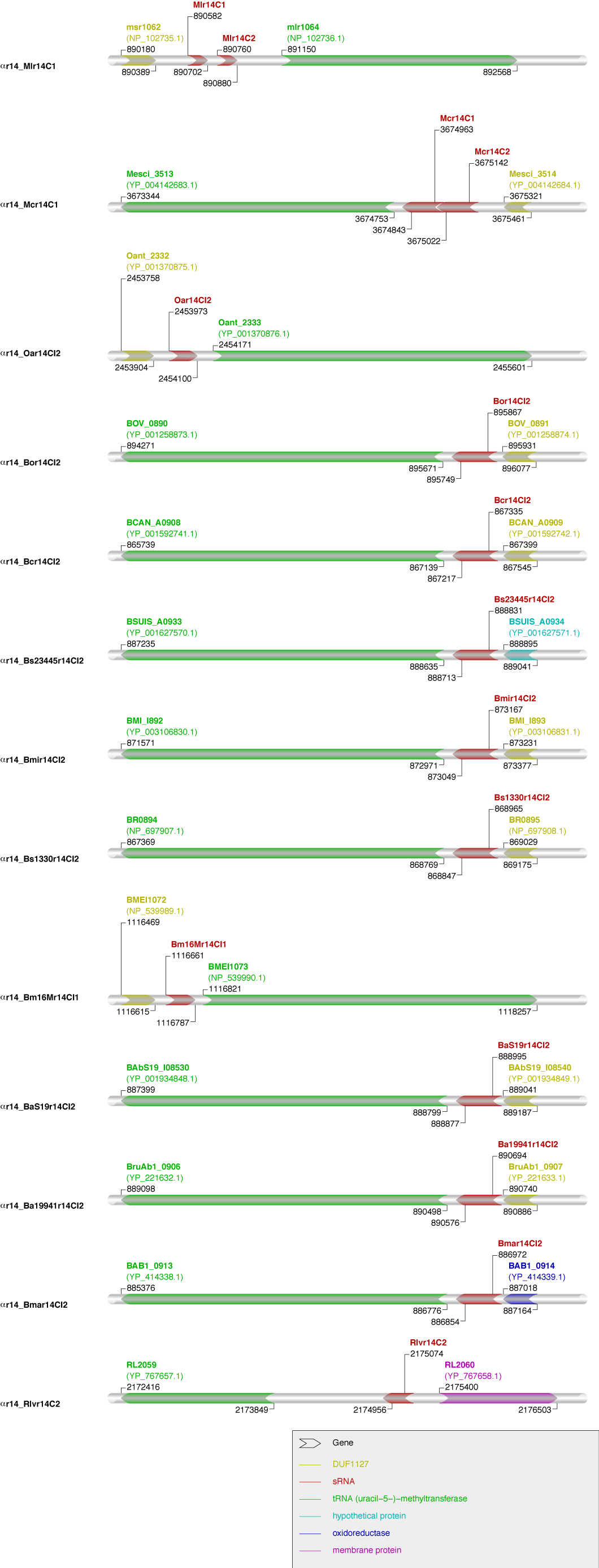
Figure 7: Group III according to the genomic context of the αr14 family. The αr14 RNA genes are represented by red arrows and the flanking ORFs by arrows on different colors depending on their product function (legend). Numbers indicate the αr14 RNA gene's and flanking ORFs coordinates in each organism genome database. The gene strand is represented with the file direction. On the left of the figure identification names are used which correspond to a certain organism: αr14_Rlvr14C2 = Rhizobium leguminosarum bv viciae 3841 (NC_008380), αr14_Mlr14C1 = Mesorhizobium loti MAFF303099 chromosome (NC_002678), αr14_Mcr14C1 = Mesorhizobium ciceri biovar biserrulae WSM127 chromosome (NC_014923), αr14_Bcr14CI2 = Brucella canis ATCC 23365 chromosome I (NC_010103), αr14_Bs23445r14CI2 = Brucella suis ATCC 23445 chromosome I (NC_010169), αr14_Bm16Mr14CI1 = Brucella melitensis bv str 16M chromosome I (NC_003317), αr14_BaS19r14CI2 = Brucella abortus S19 chromosome 2 (NC_010742), αr14_Bm23457r14CI1 = Brucella melitensis ATCC 23457 chromosome II (NC_012441), αr14_Bs1330r14CI2 = Brucella suis 1330 chromosome I (NC_004310), αr14_Ba19941r14CI2 = Brucella abortus bv str 9-94chromosome I (NC_006932), αr14_Bmar14CI2 = Brucella melitensis biovar Abortus 2308 chromosome I (NC_007618), αr14_Bor14CI2 = Brucella ovis ATCC 25840 chromosome I (NC_009505), αr14_Bmir14CI2 = Brucella microti CCM 4915 chromosome 2 (NC_013119), αr14_Oar14CI2 = Brucella anthropi ATCC 49188 chromosome 1 (NC_009667).

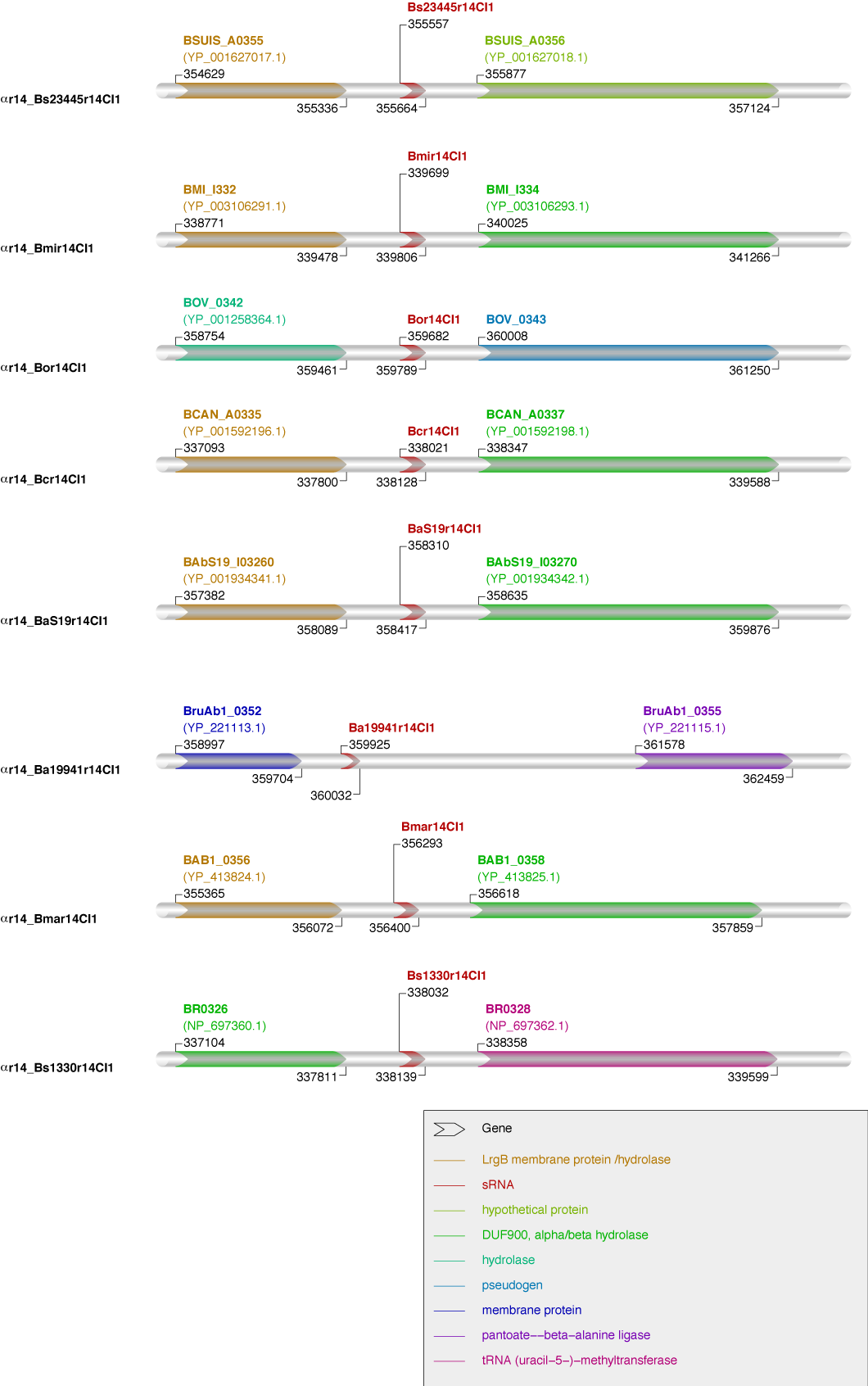
Figure 8: Group IV according to the genomic context of the αr14 family.. The αr14 RNA genes are represented by red arrows and the flanking ORFs by arrows on different colors depending on their product function (legend). Numbers indicate the αr14 RNA gene's and flanking ORFs coordinates in each organism genome database. The gene strand is represented with the file direction. On the left of the figure identification names are used which correspond to a certain organism: αr14_Bcr14CI1 = Brucella canis ATCC 23365 chromosome I (NC_010103), αr14_Bs23445r14CI1 = Brucella suis ATCC 23445 chromosome I (NC_010169), αr14_BaS19r14CI1 = Brucella abortus S19 chromosome 1 (NC_010742), αr14_Bs1330r14CI1 = Brucella suis 1330 chromosome I (NC_004310), αr14_Ba19941r14CI1 = Brucella abortus bv str 9-94chromosome I (NC_006932), αr14_Bor14CI1 = Brucella ovis ATCC 25840 chromosome I (NC_009505), αr14_Bmir14CI1 = Brucella microti CCM 4915 chromosome 1 (NC_013119).

Additional files:

- Additional file 1
- Additional file 2
- Additional file 3
- Additional file 4
- Additional file 5
- Additional file 6
- Additional file 7
- Additional file 8
- Additional file 9
- Additional file 10
- Additional file 11

Table 3: Detailed Genomic context information of the α14 sRNA seed members.
Family	Feature	Name	Strand	Begin	End	Protein name	Annotation	Organism
αr14	gene	SMc02051	R	1666735	1666878	NP_385651.1	DUF1127	Sinorhizobium meliloti 1021 (NC_003047)
αr14	sRNA	Smr14C2	R	1667491	1667613	-	sRNA	Sinorhizobium meliloti 1021 (NC_003047)
αr14	sRNA	Smr14C3	R	1667769	1667891	-	sRNA	Sinorhizobium meliloti 1021 (NC_003047)
αr14	gene	SMc02050	D	1668357	1668441	YP_001326866.1	trigger factor	Sinorhizobium meliloti 1021 (NC_003047)
αr14	gene	Smed_1180	R	1257614	1257814	YP_001326866.1	DUF1127	Sinorhizobium medicae WSM419 (NC_009636)
αr14	sRNA	Smedr14C1	R	1258038	1258160	-	sRNA	Sinorhizobium medicae WSM419 chromosome (NC_009636)
αr14	sRNA	Smedr14C2	R	1258311	1258431	-	sRNA	Sinorhizobium medicae WSM419 chromosome (NC_009636)
αr14	gene	Smed_1181	D	1258759	1258843	YP_001326867.1	trigger factor	Sinorhizobium medicae WSM419 chromosome (NC_009636)
αr14	gene	RHECIAT_CH0001925	D	1911937	1912446	YP_001978070.1	hypothetical protein	Rhizobium etli CIAT 652 (NC_010994)
αr14	sRNA	ReCIATr14C3	R	1912478	1912597	-	sRNA	Rhizobium etli CIAT 652 (NC_010994)
αr14	gene	RHECIAT_CH0001926	D	1912923	1914026	YP_001978071.1	membrane protein	Rhizobium etli CIAT 652 (NC_010994)
αr14	gene	Atu4110	D	1229427	1230176	NP_356536.1	serine dehydrogenase	Agrobacterium tumefaciens str. C58 chromosome linear (NC_003063)
αr14	sRNA	Atr14C2	D	1230297	1230426	-	sRNA	Agrobacterium tumefaciens str. C58 chromosome linear (NC_003063)
αr14	gene	Atu4112	D	1230719	1231906	NP_356534.2	proline dipeptidase-metalloexopeptidase	Agrobacterium tumefaciens str. C58 chromosome linear (NC_003063)
αr14	gene	Rleg_1700	R	1696657	1696803	YP_002975526.1	DUF1127	Rhizobium leguminosarum bv. trifolii WSM1325 (NC_012850)
αr14	sRNA	Rlt1325r14C2	R	1697038	1697156	-	sRNA	Rhizobium leguminosarum bv. trifolii WSM1325 (NC_012850)
αr14	gene	Rleg_1701	D	1697482	1698585	YP_002975527.1	membrane protein	Rhizobium leguminosarum bv. trifolii WSM1325 (NC_012850)
αr14	gene	RHE_CH01838	D	1925699	1926187	YP_469358.1	hypothetical protein	Rhizobium etli CFN 42 (NC_007761)
αr14	sRNA	ReCFNr14C2	R	1926239	1926358	-	sRNA	Rhizobium etli CFN 42 (NC_007761)
αr14	gene	RHE_CH01839	D	1926684	1927778	YP_469359.1	membrane protein	Rhizobium etli CFN 42 (NC_007761)
αr14	gene	Rleg2_1502	R	1533929	1534075	YP_002281020.1	DUF1127	Rhizobium leguminosarum bv. trifolii WSM2304 chromosome (NC_011369)
αr14	sRNA	Rlt2304r14C2	R	1534501	1534621	-	sRNA	Rhizobium leguminosarum bv. trifolii WSM2304 chromosome (NC_011369)
αr14	gene	Rleg2_1503	D	1534947	1536050	YP_002281021.1	membrane protein	Rhizobium leguminosarum bv. trifolii WSM2304 chromosome (NC_011369)
αr14	gene	AGROH133_02958	R	108794	109252	YP_004277412.1	aminoacyl-tRNA ligase	Agrobacterium sp. H13-3 chromosome (NC_015183)
αr14	sRNA	AH13r14C1	D	109372	109501	-	sRNA	Agrobacterium sp. H13-3 chromosome (NC_015183)
αr14	gene	AGROH133_02961	D	109733	109942	YP_004277414.1	cold shock protein	Agrobacterium sp. H13-3 chromosome (NC_015183)
αr14	gene	NGR_c13890	R	1433785	1433985	YP_002825922.1	DUF1127	Sinorhizobium fredii NGR234 chromosome (NC_012587)
αr14	sRNA	Sfr14C2	R	1434463	1434586	-	sRNA	Sinorhizobium fredii NGR234 chromosome (NC_012587)
αr14	sRNA	Sfr14C1	R	1434171	1434293	-	sRNA	Sinorhizobium fredii NGR234 chromosome (NC_012587)
αr14	gene	NGR_c13920	R	1434843	1434925	YP_002825924.1	trigger factor	Sinorhizobium fredii NGR234 chromosome (NC_012587)
αr14	gene	Rleg2_0104	D	96796	97677	YP_002279632.1	aldo/keto reductase	Rhizobium leguminosarum bv. trifolii WSM2304 chromosome (NC_011369)
αr14	sRNA	Rlt2304r14C1	D	98050	98171	-	sRNA	Rhizobium leguminosarum bv. trifolii WSM2304 chromosome (NC_011369)
αr14	gene	Rleg2_0105	D	98282	99559	YP_002279633.1	DUF900, alpha/beta hydrolase	Rhizobium leguminosarum bv. trifolii WSM2304 chromosome (NC_011369)
αr14	gene	Atu0104	R	108895	109353	NP_353139.1	aminoacyl-tRNA ligase	Agrobacterium tumefaciens str. C58 chromosome circular (NC_003062)
αr14	sRNA	Atr14C1	D	109473	109601	-	sRNA	Agrobacterium tumefaciens str. C58 chromosome circular (NC_003062)
αr14	gene	Atu0106	D	109823	110032	NP_353140.2	cold shock protein	Agrobacterium tumefaciens str. C58 chromosome circular (NC_003062)
αr14	gene	RHECIAT_CH0000515	D	512732	513613	YP_001976686.1	oxidoreductase	Rhizobium etli CIAT 652 (NC_010994)
αr14	sRNA	ReCIATr14C1	D	513993	514114	-	sRNA	Rhizobium etli CIAT 652 (NC_010994)
αr14	gene	RHECIAT_CH0000517	D	514221	515498	YP_001976688.1	DUF900, alpha/beta hydrolase	Rhizobium etli CIAT 652 (NC_010994)
αr14	gene	RL0474	D	511376	512272	YP_766083.1	aldo/keto reductase	Rhizobium leguminosarum bv. viciae 3841 (NC_008380)
αr14	sRNA	Rlvr14C1	D	512658	512779	-	sRNA	Rhizobium leguminosarum bv. viciae 3841 (NC_008380)
αr14	gene	RL0475	R	512816	513202	YP_766084.1	hypothetical protein	Rhizobium leguminosarum bv. viciae 3841 (NC_008380)
αr14	gene	RHE_CH00449	D	461301	462182	YP_467997.1	oxidoreductase	Rhizobium etli CFN 42 (NC_007761)
αr14	sRNA	ReCFNr14C1	D	462566	462687	-	sRNA	Rhizobium etli CFN 42 (NC_007761)
αr14	gene	RHE_CH00450	D	462794	464071	YP_467998.1	DUF900, alpha/beta hydrolase	Rhizobium etli CFN 42 (NC_007761)
αr14	gene	Avi_0122	R	113190	114716	YP_002548072.1	sulfatase	Agrobacterium vitis S4 chromosome 1 chromosome 1 (NC_011989)
αr14	sRNA	Avr14CI1	D	115126	115257	-	sRNA	Agrobacterium vitis S4 chromosome 1 chromosome 1 (NC_011989)
αr14	gene	Avi_0126	D	115395	116840	YP_002548074.1	phosphomannomutase	Agrobacterium vitis S4 chromosome 1 chromosome 1 (NC_011989)
αr14	gene	Arad_2144	R	1692677	1692823	YP_002544330.1	DUF1127	Agrobacterium radiobacter K84 chromosome 1 (NC_011985)
αr14	sRNA	Arr14CI2	R	1693278	1693409	-	sRNA	Agrobacterium radiobacter K84 chromosome 1 (NC_011985)
αr14	gene	Arad_2145	D	1693731	1694870	YP_002544331.1	membrane protein	Agrobacterium radiobacter K84 chromosome 1 (NC_011985)
αr14	gene	RHECIAT_CH0004359	D	4444289	4444867	YP_001980464.1	nicotinic acid mononucleotide adenylyltransferase	Rhizobium etli CIAT 652 (NC_010994)
αr14	sRNA	ReCIATr14C4	R	4444894	4445016	-	sRNA	Rhizobium etli CIAT 652 (NC_010994)
αr14	gene	RHECIAT_CH0004360	R	4445118	4445327	YP_001980465.1	hypothetical protein	Rhizobium etli CIAT 652 (NC_010994)
αr14	gene	Rleg_0114	D	105825	106706	YP_002973964.1	aldo/keto reductase	Rhizobium leguminosarum bv. trifolii WSM1325 (NC_012850)
αr14	sRNA	Rlt1325r14C1	D	107063	107184	-	sRNA	Rhizobium leguminosarum bv. trifolii WSM1325 (NC_012850)
αr14	gene	Rleg_0115	D	107377	108654	YP_002973965.1	DUF900, alpha/beta hydrolase	Rhizobium leguminosarum bv. trifolii WSM1325 (NC_012850)
αr14	gene	Avi_2480	R	2042548	2043660	YP_002549780.1	membrane protein	Agrobacterium vitis S4 chromosome 1 chromosome 1 (NC_011989)
αr14	sRNA	Avr14CI2	D	2043913	2044044	-	sRNA	Agrobacterium vitis S4 chromosome 1 chromosome 1 (NC_011989)
αr14	gene	Avi_2481	D	2044292	2044441	YP_002549781.1	DUF1127	Agrobacterium vitis S4 chromosome 1 chromosome 1 (NC_011989)
αr14	gene	NGR_b21490	R	2204845	2205168	YP_002824347.1	acylphosphatase	Sinorhizobium fredii NGR234 plasmid pNGR234b (NC_012586)
αr14	sRNA	Sfr14b	D	2205311	2205428	-	sRNA	Sinorhizobium fredii NGR234 plasmid pNGR234b (NC_012586)
αr14	gene	NGR_b21500	D	2205588	2206316	YP_002824348.1	RNA polymerase sigma factor	Sinorhizobium fredii NGR234 plasmid pNGR234b (NC_012586)
αr14	gene	Arad_4880	D	3944888	3945469	YP_002546417.1	nicotinic acid mononucleotide adenylyltransferase	Agrobacterium radiobacter K84 chromosome 1 (NC_011985)
αr14	sRNA	Arr14CI3	R	3945511	3945639	-	sRNA	Agrobacterium radiobacter K84 chromosome 1 (NC_011985)
αr14	gene	Arad_4883	D	3946044	3946844	YP_002546419.1	molybdenum ABC transporter	Agrobacterium radiobacter K84 chromosome 1 (NC_011985)
αr14	gene	RHE_CH04070	D	4313781	4314359	YP_471540.1	nicotinic acid mononucleotide adenylyltransferase	Rhizobium etli CFN 42 (NC_007761)
αr14	sRNA	ReCFNr14C3	R	4314384	4314505	-	sRNA	Rhizobium etli CFN 42 (NC_007761)
αr14	gene	RHE_CH04071	D	4314798	4315589	YP_471541.1	molybdenum ABC transporter	Rhizobium etli CFN 42 (NC_007761)
αr14	gene	Rleg_4201	D	4295976	4296575	YP_002977981.1	nicotinic acid mononucleotide adenylyltransferase	Rhizobium leguminosarum bv. trifolii WSM1325 (NC_012850)
αr14	sRNA	Rlt1325r14C3	R	4296632	4296749	-	sRNA	Rhizobium leguminosarum bv. trifolii WSM1325 (NC_012850)
αr14	gene	Rleg_4202	D	4297098	4297889	YP_002977982.1	molybdenum ABC transporter	Rhizobium leguminosarum bv. trifolii WSM1325 (NC_012850)
αr14	gene	RL4684	D	4987413	4988012	YP_770246.1	nicotinic acid mononucleotide adenylyltransferase	Rhizobium leguminosarum bv. viciae 3841 (NC_008380)
αr14	sRNA	Rlvr14C3	R	4988030	4988158	-	sRNA	Rhizobium leguminosarum bv. viciae 3841 (NC_008380)
αr14	gene	RL4685	D	4988507	4989298	YP_770247.1	molybdenum ABC transporter	Rhizobium leguminosarum bv. viciae 3841 (NC_008380)
αr14	gene	Rleg2_3877	D	4018721	4019299	YP_002283365.1	nicotinic acid mononucleotide adenylyltransferase	Rhizobium leguminosarum bv. trifolii WSM2304 chromosome (NC_011369)
αr14	sRNA	Rlt2304r14C3	R	4019326	4019446	-	sRNA	Rhizobium leguminosarum bv. trifolii WSM2304 chromosome (NC_011369)
αr14	gene	Rleg2_3878	D	4019781	4020572	YP_002283366.1	molybdenum ABC transporter	Rhizobium leguminosarum bv. trifolii WSM2304 chromosome (NC_011369)
αr14	gene	Arad_12190	D	137950	138255	YP_002546688.1	FAD dependent oxidoreductase	Agrobacterium radiobacter K84 plasmid pAtK84c (NC_011987)
αr14	sRNA	Arr14Atc	R	138495	138625	-	sRNA	Agrobacterium radiobacter K84 plasmid pAtK84c (NC_011987)
αr14	gene	Arad_12193	R	139226	140683	YP_002546689.1	Cytochrome c2C mono- and diheme oxidoreductase	Agrobacterium radiobacter K84 plasmid pAtK84c (NC_011987)
αr14	gene	Arad_8084	D	957315	957461	YP_002541036.1	DUF1127	Agrobacterium radiobacter K84 chromosome 2 (NC_011983)
αr14	sRNA	Arr14CII1	D	957686	957817	-	sRNA	Agrobacterium radiobacter K84 chromosome 2 (NC_011983)
αr14	gene	Arad_8086	R	957909	958754	YP_002541037.1	DUF900, alpha/beta hydrolase	Agrobacterium radiobacter K84 chromosome 2 (NC_011983)
αr14	gene	SM_b20590	R	1605382	1605705	NP_438042.1	acylphosphatase	Sinorhizobium meliloti 1021 plasmid pSymB (NC_003078)
αr14	sRNA	Smr14B	D	1605826	1605943	-	sRNA	Sinorhizobium meliloti 1021 plasmid pSymB (NC_003078)
αr14	gene	SM_b20592	D	1606089	1606772	NP_438044.1	RNA polymerase sigma factor	Sinorhizobium meliloti 1021 plasmid pSymB (NC_003078)
αr14	gene	Avi_5586	D	597555	598229	YP_002547399.1	hypothetical protein	Agrobacterium vitis S4 chromosome 2 (NC_011988)
αr14	sRNA	Avr14CII1	R	598426	598556	-	sRNA	Agrobacterium vitis S4 chromosome 2 (NC_011988)
αr14	gene	Avi_5587	R	598779	598925	YP_002547400.1	DUF1127	Agrobacterium vitis S4 chromosome 2 (NC_011988)
αr14	gene	Smed_4197	R	678214	678885	YP_001312935.1	RNA polymerase sigma factor	Sinorhizobium medicae WSM419 plasmid pSMED01 (NC_009620)
αr14	sRNA	Smedr14p01	R	679043	679160	-	sRNA	Sinorhizobium medicae WSM419 plasmid pSMED01 (NC_009620)
αr14	gene	Smed_4198	D	679315	679599	YP_001312936.1	acylphosphatase	Sinorhizobium medicae WSM419 plasmid pSMED01 (NC_009620)
αr14	gene	Rleg_6288	D	1484	2256	YP_002979285.1	hypothetical protein	Rhizobium leguminosarum bv. trifolii WSM1325 plasmid pR132505 (NC_012854)
αr14	sRNA	Rlt1325r14p05	R	2286	2409	-	sRNA	Rhizobium leguminosarum bv. trifolii WSM1325 plasmid pR132505 (NC_012854)
αr14	gene	Rleg_6290	D	3237	3734	YP_002979286.1	hypothetical protein	Rhizobium leguminosarum bv. trifolii WSM1325 plasmid pR132505 (NC_012854)
αr14	gene	Rleg_6602	D	28280	28426	YP_002984605.1	DUF1127	Rhizobium leguminosarum bv. trifolii WSM1325 plasmid pR132502 (NC_012858)
αr14	sRNA	Rlt1325r14p02	D	28646	28767	-	sRNA	Rhizobium leguminosarum bv. trifolii WSM1325 plasmid pR132502(NC_012858)
αr14	gene	Rleg_6603	D	29055	29891	YP_002984606.1	5-keto-4-deoxyuronate isomerase	Rhizobium leguminosarum bv. trifolii WSM1325 plasmid pR132502 (NC_012858)
αr14	gene	Smed_5370	D	338535	338681	YP_001314073.1	DUF1127	Sinorhizobium medicae WSM419 plasmid pSMED02 (NC_009621)
αr14	sRNA	Smedr14p022	D	338866	338990	-	sRNA	Sinorhizobium medicae WSM419 plasmid pSMED02 (NC_009621)
αr14	gene	Smed_5371	R	339017	339226	YP_001314074.1	hypothetical protein	Sinorhizobium medicae WSM419 plasmid pSMED02 (NC_009621)
αr14	gene	pRL110530	R	573348	574184	YP_771564.1	5-keto-4-deoxyuronate isomerase	Rhizobium leguminosarum bv. viciae 3841 plasmid pRL11 (NC_008384)
αr14	sRNA	Rlvr14p11	R	574471	574593	-	sRNA	Rhizobium leguminosarum bv. viciae 3841 plasmid pRL11 (NC_008384)
αr14	gene	pRL110532	R	574811	574957	YP_771566.1	DUF1127	Rhizobium leguminosarum bv. viciae 3841 plasmid pRL11 (NC_008384)
αr14	gene	Arad_9216	R	1920052	1920927	YP_002541901.1	glutathione S-transferase Ygh	Agrobacterium radiobacter K84 chromosome 2 (NC_011983)
αr14	sRNA	Arr14CII2	R	1921110	1921242	-	sRNA	Agrobacterium radiobacter K84 chromosome 2 (NC_011983)
αr14	gene	Arad_9217	R	1921485	1921631	YP_002541902.1	DUF1127	Agrobacterium radiobacter K84 chromosome 2 (NC_011983)
αr14	gene	Arad_0725	D	596785	597666	YP_002543276.1	oxidoreductase	Agrobacterium radiobacter K84 chromosome 1 (NC_011985)
αr14	sRNA	Arr14CI1	D	597903	598030	-	sRNA	Agrobacterium radiobacter K84 chromosome 1 (NC_011985)
αr14	gene	Arad_0727	D	598187	599503	YP_002543277.1	DUF900, alpha/beta hydrolase	Agrobacterium radiobacter K84 chromosome 1 (NC_011985)
αr14	gene	RHE_PE00400	R	441962	442798	YP_472562.1	5-keto-4-deoxyuronate isomerase	Rhizobium etli CFN 42 plasmid p42e (NC_007765)
αr14	sRNA	ReCFNr14e	R	443001	443129	-	sRNA	Rhizobium etli CFN 42 plasmid p42e (NC_007765)
αr14	gene	RHE_PE00401	R	443336	443482	YP_472563.1	hypothetical protein	Rhizobium etli CFN 42 plasmid p42e (NC_007765)
αr14	gene	Rleg_4483	D	265481	265806	-	pseudogen	Rhizobium leguminosarum bv. trifolii WSM1325 plasmid pR132501 (NC_012848)
αr14	sRNA	Rlt1325r14p012	D	265945	266069	-	sRNA	Rhizobium leguminosarum bv. trifolii WSM1325 plasmid pR132501 (NC_012848)
αr14	gene	Rleg_4484	R	266933	267917	-	pseudogen	Rhizobium leguminosarum bv. trifolii WSM1325 plasmid pR132501 (NC_012848)
αr14	gene	Rleg2_5661	D	50447	50593	YP_002277936.1	DUF1127	Rhizobium leguminosarum bv. trifolii WSM2304 plasmid pR132501 (NC_011366)
αr14	sRNA	Rlt2304r14p02	D	50814	50936	-	sRNA	Rhizobium leguminosarum bv. trifolii WSM2304 plasmid pR132501 (NC_011366)
αr14	gene	Rleg2_5662	D	51199	52035	YP_002277937.1	5-keto-4-deoxyuronate isomerase	Rhizobium leguminosarum bv. trifolii WSM2304 plasmid pR132501 (NC_011366)
αr14	gene	Rleg2_4962	R	606812	607117	YP_002278931.1	hypothetical protein	Rhizobium leguminosarum bv. trifolii WSM2304 plasmid pR132501 (NC_011368)
αr14	sRNA	Rlt2304r14p012	D	607636	607759	-	sRNA	Rhizobium leguminosarum bv. trifolii WSM2304 plasmid pR132501 (NC_011368)
αr14	gene	Rleg2_4963	R	607786	608067	-	pseudogen	Rhizobium leguminosarum bv. trifolii WSM2304 plasmid pR132501 (NC_011368)
αr14	gene	Rleg_6084	D	118943	119089	YP_002978590.1	DUF1127	Rhizobium leguminosarum bv. trifolii WSM1325 plasmid pR132504 (NC_012852)
αr14	sRNA	Rlt1325r14p04	D	119314	119443	-	sRNA	Rhizobium leguminosarum bv. trifolii WSM1325 plasmid pR132504 (NC_012852)
αr14	gene	Rleg_6085	R	119664	120056	YP_002978591.1	Cell wall assembly/cell proliferation coordinating protein, KNR4-like	Rhizobium leguminosarum bv. trifolii WSM1325 plasmid pR132504 (NC_012852)
αr14	gene	Avi_3374	D	2792636	2793793	YP_002550427.1	DNA polymerase I	Agrobacterium vitis S4 chromosome 1 (NC_011989)
αr14	sRNA	Avr14CI3	R	2793803	2793939	-	sRNA	Agrobacterium vitis S4 chromosome 1 (NC_011989)
αr14	gene	Avi_3375	R	2794154	2794300	YP_002550428.1	DUF1127	Agrobacterium vitis S4 chromosome 1 (NC_011989)
αr14	gene	RHECIAT_PA0000319	R	344808	345644	YP_001985926.1	5-keto-4-deoxyuronate isomerase	Rhizobium etli CIAT 652 plasmid pA (NC_010998)
αr14	sRNA	ReCIATr14A	R	345900	346021	-	sRNA	Rhizobium etli CIAT 652 plasmid pA (NC_010998)
αr14	gene	RHECIAT_PA0000320	R	346130	346366	YP_001985927.1	DUF1127	Rhizobium etli CIAT 652 plasmid pA (NC_010998)
αr14	gene	Meso_1791	D	1916546	1916686	YP_674350.1	DUF1127	Mesorhizobium sp. BNC1 (NC_008254)
αr14	sRNA	MsBCNr14C1	D	1916694	1916817	-	sRNA	Mesorhizobium sp. BNC1 (NC_008254)
αr14	gene	Meso_1793	R	1918307	1920064	YP_674352.1	hypothetical protein	Mesorhizobium sp. BNC1 (NC_008254)
αr14	gene	Avi_5890	D	899428	900909	YP_002547646.1	sulfate permease	Agrobacterium vitis S4 chromosome 2 (NC_011988)
αr14	sRNA	Avr14CII2	D	901035	901159	-	sRNA	Agrobacterium vitis S4 chromosome 2 (NC_011988)
αr14	gene	Avi_5891	R	901178	902659	YP_002547647.1	siroheme synthase	Agrobacterium vitis S4 chromosome 2 (NC_011988)
αr14	gene	Avi_9007	D	6113	7192	YP_002542553.1	two component sensor kinase	Agrobacterium vitis S4 plasmid pAtS4c (NC_011984)
αr14	sRNA	Avr14Atc	D	7318	7444	-	sRNA	Agrobacterium vitis S4 plasmid pAtS4c (NC_011984)
αr14	gene	Avi_9008	R	7500	8633	YP_002542554.1	phage integrase family protein	Agrobacterium vitis S4 plasmid pAtS4c (NC_011984)
αr14	gene	RHECIAT_CH0001166	R	1172125	1173279	YP_001977325.1	polyhydroxybutyrate depolymerase protein	Rhizobium etli CIAT 652 (NC_010994)
αr14	sRNA	ReCIATr14C2	D	1173512	1173639	-	sRNA	Rhizobium etli CIAT 652 (NC_010994)
αr14	gene	RHECIAT_CH0001168	D	1173948	1174214	YP_001977327.1	DUF2277	Rhizobium etli CIAT 652 (NC_010994)
αr14	gene	Atu4670	R	1831052	1831294	NP_535148.1	hypothetical protein	Agrobacterium tumefaciens str. C58 chromosome linear (NC_003063)
αr14	sRNA	Atr14C3	D	1831483	1831614	-	sRNA	Agrobacterium tumefaciens str. C58 chromosome linear (NC_003063)
αr14	gene	Atu4671	R	1831642	1832085	NP_355992.2	response regulator	Agrobacterium tumefaciens str. C58 chromosome linear (NC_003063)
αr14	gene	RHECIAT_PB0000101	R	111975	112217	YP_001984364.1	hypothetical protein	Rhizobium etli CIAT 652 plasmid pB (NC_010996)
αr14	sRNA	ReCIATr14B	D	112292	112425	-	sRNA	Rhizobium etli CIAT 652 plasmid pB (NC_010996)
αr14	gene	RHECIAT_PB0000102	D	112536	113108	YP_001984365.1	hypothetical protein	Rhizobium etli CIAT 652 plasmid pB (NC_010996)
αr14	gene	RHE_PD00068	D	76637	77354	NP_659968.2	hypothetical protein	Rhizobium etli CFN 42 symbiotic plasmid p42d (NC_004041)
αr14	sRNA	ReCFNr14d	D	77668	77794	-	sRNA	Rhizobium etli CFN 42 symbiotic plasmid p42d (NC_004041)
αr14	gene	RHE_PD00069	D	77912	78484	NP_659967.1	hydrolase	Rhizobium etli CFN 42 symbiotic plasmid p42d (NC_004041)
αr14	gene	NGR_c35080	R	3718015	3720336	YP_002827985.1	penicillin-binding	Sinorhizobium fredii NGR234 chromosome (NC_012587)
αr14	sRNA	Sfr14C3	D	3720579	3720700	-	sRNA	Sinorhizobium fredii NGR234 chromosome (NC_012587)
αr14	gene	NGR_c35100	D	3721900	3722382	YP_002827987.1	hypothetical protein	Sinorhizobium fredii NGR234 chromosome (NC_012587)
αr14	gene	Smed_3386	R	3589318	3590205	YP_001329042.1	membrane protein	Sinorhizobium medicae WSM419 chromosome (NC_009636)
αr14	sRNA	Smedr14C3	R	3590299	3590417	-	sRNA	Sinorhizobium medicae WSM419 chromosome (NC_009636)
αr14	gene	Smed_3387	R	3590494	3590925	YP_001329043.1	pyrimidine dimer DNA glycosylase	Sinorhizobium medicae WSM419 chromosome (NC_009636)
αr14	gene	SMc02855	R	205860	206783	NP_384286.1	membrane protein	Sinorhizobium meliloti 1021 (NC_003047)
αr14	sRNA	Smr14C1	R	206862	206980	-	sRNA	Sinorhizobium meliloti 1021 (NC_003047)
αr14	gene	SMc02856	D	207244	209547	NP_384287.1	penicillin-binding protein	Sinorhizobium meliloti 1021 (NC_003047)
αr14	gene	msr1062	D	890180	890389	NP_102735.1	DUF1127	Mesorhizobium loti MAFF303099 chromosome (NC_002678)
αr14	sRNA	Mlr14C1	D	890582	890702	-	sRNA	Mesorhizobium loti MAFF303099 chromosome (NC_002678)
αr14	sRNA	Mlr14C2	D	890760	890880	-	sRNA	Mesorhizobium loti MAFF303099 chromosome (NC_002678)
αr14	gene	mlr1064	D	891150	892568	NP_102736.1	tRNA (uracil-5-)-methyltransferase	Mesorhizobium loti MAFF303099 chromosome (NC_002678)
αr14	gene	SMa2165	D	1219615	1220355	NP_436422.1	oxidoreductase	Sinorhizobium meliloti 1021 plasmid pSymA (NC_003037)
αr14	sRNA	Smr14A1	D	1220690	1220808	-	sRNA	Sinorhizobium meliloti 1021 plasmid pSymA (NC_003037)
αr14	gene	SMa2167	D	1221480	1221947	NP_436423.1	transcription factor regulator	Sinorhizobium meliloti 1021 plasmid pSymA (NC_003037)
αr14	gene	pRL120374	R	403573	404652	YP_764884.1	ribonuclease domain-containing protein	Rhizobium leguminosarum bv. viciae 3841 plasmid pRL12 (NC_008378)
αr14	sRNA	Rlvr14p12	D	407202	407316	-	sRNA	Rhizobium leguminosarum bv. viciae 3841 plasmid pRL12 (NC_008378)
αr14	gene	pRL120378	R	408099	409010	YP_764885.1	L-isoaspartate O-methyltransferase	Rhizobium leguminosarum bv. viciae 3841 plasmid pRL12 (NC_008378)
αr14	gene	Mesci_3513	R	3673344	3674753	YP_004142683.1	tRNA (uracil-5-)-methyltransferase	Mesorhizobium ciceri biovar biserrulae WSM1271 chromosome (NC_014923)
αr14	sRNA	Mcr14C1	R	3674843	3674963	-	sRNA	Mesorhizobium ciceri biovar biserrulae WSM1271 chromosome (NC_014923)
αr14	sRNA	Mcr14C2	R	3675022	3675142	-	sRNA	Mesorhizobium ciceri biovar biserrulae WSM1271 chromosome (NC_014923)
αr14	gene	Mesci_3514	R	3675321	3675461	YP_004142684.1	DUF1127	Mesorhizobium ciceri biovar biserrulae WSM1271 chromosome (NC_014923)
αr14	gene	Oant_0422	D	447656	448351	YP_001368982.1	LrgB membrane protein /hydrolase	Brucella anthropi ATCC 49188 chromosome 1 (NC_009667)
αr14	sRNA	Oar14CI1	D	448505	448614	-	sRNA	Brucella anthropi ATCC 49188 chromosome 1 (NC_009667)
αr14	gene	Oant_0423	D	448748	450301	YP_001368983.1	glyoxalase bleomycin resistance protein dioxygenase/hydrolase	Brucella anthropi ATCC 49188 chromosome 1 (NC_009667)
αr14	gene	Oant_2969	R	272174	273850	YP_001371506.1	hypothetical protein	Brucella anthropi ATCC 49188 chromosome 2 (NC_009668)
αr14	sRNA	Oar14CII1	D	274684	274807	-	sRNA	Brucella anthropi ATCC 49188 chromosome 2 (NC_009668)
αr14	gene	Oant_2970	D	275652	276380	YP_001371507.1	septum formation inhibitor	Brucella anthropi ATCC 49188 chromosome 2 (NC_009668)
αr14	gene	SMa2355	D	1327042	1328151	NP_436520.4	DNA polymerase I	Sinorhizobium meliloti 1021 plasmid pSymA (NC_003037)
αr14	sRNA	Smr14A2	R	1328176	1328301	-	sRNA	Sinorhizobium meliloti 1021 plasmid pSymA (NC_003037)
αr14	gene	SMa2357	D	1329978	1330670	NP_436521.2	adenylate guanylate cyclase	Sinorhizobium meliloti 1021 plasmid pSymA (NC_003037)
αr14	gene	Oant_2332	D	2453758	2453904	YP_001370875.1	DUF1127	Brucella anthropi ATCC 49188 chromosome 1 (NC_009667)
αr14	sRNA	Oar14CI2	D	2453973	2454100	-	sRNA	Brucella anthropi ATCC 49188 chromosome 1 (NC_009667)
αr14	gene	Oant_2333	D	2454171	2455601	YP_001370876.1	tRNA (uracil-5-)-methyltransferase	Brucella anthropi ATCC 49188 chromosome 1 (NC_009667)
αr14	gene	Rleg_4742	D	111695	112336	YP_002972933.1	hypothetical protein	Rhizobium leguminosarum bv. trifolii WSM1325 plasmid pR132501 (NC_012848)
αr14	sRNA	Rlt1325r14p011	D	112604	112728	-	sRNA	Rhizobium leguminosarum bv. trifolii WSM1325 plasmid pR132501 (NC_012848)
αr14	gene	Rleg_4743	R	112925	113309	-	hypothetical protein	Rhizobium leguminosarum bv. trifolii WSM1325 plasmid pR132501 (NC_012848)
αr14	gene	Meso_3687	R	3975340	3976962	YP_676220.1	alpha amylase-C hydrolase	Mesorhizobium sp. BNC1 (NC_008254)
αr14	sRNA	MsBCNr14C2	R	3977086	3977208	-	sRNA	Mesorhizobium sp. BNC1 (NC_008254)
αr14	gene	Meso_3688	D	3977363	3978682	YP_676221.1	homoserine dehydrogenase-C NAD-binding	Mesorhizobium sp. BNC1 (NC_008254)
αr14	gene	BSUIS_A0355	D	354629	355336	YP_001627017.1	LrgB membrane protein /hydrolase	Brucella suis ATCC 23445 chromosome I (NC_010169)
αr14	sRNA	Bs23445r14CI1	D	355557	355664	-	sRNA	Brucella suis ATCC 23445 chromosome I (NC_010169)
αr14	gene	BSUIS_A0356	D	355877	357124	YP_001627018.1	hypothetical protein	Brucella suis ATCC 23445 chromosome I (NC_010169)
αr14	gene	BMI_I332	D	338771	339478	YP_003106291.1	LrgB membrane protein /hydrolase	Brucella microti CCM 4915 chromosome I (NC_013119)
αr14	sRNA	Bmir14CI1	D	339699	339806	-	sRNA	Brucella microti CCM 4915 chromosome I (NC_013119)
αr14	gene	BMI_I334	D	340025	341266	YP_003106293.1	DUF900, alpha/beta hydrolase	Brucella microti CCM 4915 chromosome I (NC_013119)
αr14	gene	BOV_0342	D	358754	359461	YP_001258364.1	hydrolase	Brucella ovis ATCC 25840 chromosome I (NC_009505)
αr14	sRNA	Bor14CI1	D	359682	359789	-	sRNA	Brucella ovis ATCC 25840 chromosome I (NC_009505)
αr14	gene	BOV_0343	D	360008	361250	-	pseudogen	Brucella ovis ATCC 25840 chromosome I (NC_009505)
αr14	gene	BCAN_A0335	D	337093	337800	YP_001592196.1	LrgB membrane protein /hydrolase	Brucella canis ATCC 23365 chromosome I (NC_010103)
αr14	sRNA	Bcr14CI1	D	338021	338128	-	sRNA	Brucella canis ATCC 23365 chromosome I (NC_010103)
αr14	gene	BCAN_A0337	D	338347	339588	YP_001592198.1	DUF900, alpha/beta hydrolase	Brucella canis ATCC 23365 chromosome I (NC_010103)
αr14	gene	BMEA_A0364	D	358048	358755	YP_002732104.1	LrgB membrane protein /hydrolase	Brucella melitensis ATCC 23457 chromosome I (NC_012441)
αr14	sRNA	Bm23457r14CI1	D	358976	359082	-	sRNA	Brucella melitensis ATCC 23457 chromosome I (NC_012441)
αr14	gene	BMEA_A0366	D	359302	360543	YP_002732106.1	DUF900, alpha/beta hydrolase	Brucella melitensis ATCC 23457 chromosome I (NC_012441)
αr14	gene	BAbS19_I03260	D	357382	358089	YP_001934341.1	LrgB membrane protein /hydrolase	Brucella abortus S19 chromosome I (NC_010742)
αr14	sRNA	BaS19r14CI1	D	358310	358417	-	sRNA	Brucella abortus S19 chromosome I (NC_010742)
αr14	gene	BAbS19_I03270	D	358635	359876	YP_001934342.1	DUF900, alpha/beta hydrolase	Brucella abortus S19 chromosome I (NC_010742)
αr14	gene	BruAb1_0352	D	358997	359704	YP_221113.1	membrane protein	Brucella abortus bv. 1 str. 9-941 chromosome I (NC_006932)
αr14	sRNA	Ba19941r14CI1	D	359925	360032	-	sRNA	Brucella abortus bv. 1 str. 9-941 chromosome I (NC_006932)
αr14	gene	BruAb1_0355	D	361578	362459	YP_221115.1	pantoate—beta-alanine ligase	Brucella abortus bv. 1 str. 9-941 chromosome I (NC_006932)
αr14	gene	BAB1_0356	D	355365	356072	YP_413824.1	LrgB membrane protein /hydrolase	Brucella melitensis biovar Abortus 2308 chromosome I (NC_007618)
αr14	sRNA	Bmar14CI1	D	356293	356400	-	sRNA	Brucella melitensis biovar Abortus 2308 chromosome I (NC_007618)
αr14	gene	BAB1_0358	D	356618	357859	YP_413825.1	DUF900, alpha/beta hydrolase	Brucella melitensis biovar Abortus 2308 chromosome I (NC_007618)
αr14	gene	BR0326	D	337104	337811	NP_697360.1	DUF900, alpha/beta hydrolase	Brucella suis 1330 chromosome I (NC_004310)
αr14	sRNA	Bs1330r14CI1	D	338032	338139	-	sRNA	Brucella suis 1330 chromosome I (NC_004310)
αr14	gene	BR0328	D	338358	339599	NP_697362.1	tRNA (uracil-5-)-methyltransferase	Brucella suis 1330 chromosome I (NC_004310)
αr14	gene	Smed_5352	R	313859	314596	YP_001314057.1	adenylate guanylate cyclase	Sinorhizobium medicae WSM419 plasmid pSMED02 (NC_009621)
αr14	sRNA	Smedr14p021	D	316304	316428	-	sRNA	Sinorhizobium medicae WSM419 plasmid pSMED02 (NC_009621)
αr14	gene	Smed_5353	R	316485	317621	YP_001314058.1	DNA polymerase I	Sinorhizobium medicae WSM419 plasmid pSMED02 (NC_009621)
αr14	gene	RHE_PF00022	R	22159	22494	YP_472643.1	hypothetical protein	Rhizobium etli CFN 42 plasmid p42f (NC_007766)
αr14	sRNA	ReCFNr14f	D	22818	22935	-	sRNA	Rhizobium etli CFN 42 plasmid p42f (NC_007766)
αr14	gene	RHE_PF00023	D	23286	23726	YP_472644.1	carbon-sulfur lyase	Rhizobium etli CFN 42 plasmid p42f (NC_007766)
αr14	gene	Oant_3865	D	1275426	1275572	YP_001372399.1	DUF1127	Brucella anthropi ATCC 49188 chromosome 2 (NC_009668)
αr14	sRNA	Oar14CII2	D	1275649	1275772	-	sRNA	Brucella anthropi ATCC 49188 chromosome 2 (NC_009668)
αr14	gene	Oant_3866	R	1275787	1277010	YP_001372400.1	membrane protein	Brucella anthropi ATCC 49188 chromosome 2 (NC_009668)
αr14	gene	Rleg2_4668	D	305380	306273	YP_002278660.1	L-isoaspartate O-methyltransferase	Rhizobium leguminosarum bv. trifolii WSM2304 plasmid pRLG201 (NC_011368)
αr14	sRNA	Rlt2304r14p011	R	306339	306454	-	sRNA	Rhizobium leguminosarum bv. trifolii WSM2304 plasmid pRLG201 (NC_011368)
αr14	gene	Rleg2_4670	R	306976	307923	YP_002278662.1	transposase IS110 family protein	Rhizobium leguminosarum bv. trifolii WSM2304 plasmid pRLG201 (NC_011368)
αr14	gene	Mesci_6302	D	240660	240910	YP_004134462.1	hypothetical protein	Mesorhizobium ciceri biovar biserrulae WSM1271 chromosome I (NC_014918)
αr14	sRNA	Mcr14p01	R	241412	241531	-	sRNA	Mesorhizobium ciceri biovar biserrulae WSM1271 chromosome I (NC_014918)
αr14	gene	Mesci_6303	R	241784	242047	YP_004134463.1	hypothetical protein	Mesorhizobium ciceri biovar biserrulae WSM1271 chromosome I (NC_014918)
αr14	gene	Mesci_2426	D	2545134	2545592	YP_004141622.1	phasin	Mesorhizobium ciceri biovar biserrulae WSM1271 chromosome I (NC_014923)
αr14	sRNA	Mcr14CI4	D	2545673	2545788	-	sRNA	Mesorhizobium ciceri biovar biserrulae WSM1271 chromosome I (NC_014923)
αr14	gene	Mesci_2427	D	2545962	2546038	YP_004141623	FAD dependent oxidoreductase	Mesorhizobium ciceri biovar biserrulae WSM1271 chromosome I (NC_014923)
αr14	gene	Mesci_5119	D	5264750	5265772	YP_004144269.1	LacI family transcription regulator	Mesorhizobium ciceri biovar biserrulae WSM1271 chromosome I (NC_014923)
αr14	sRNA	Mcr14CI5	D	5265891	5266009	-	sRNA	Mesorhizobium ciceri biovar biserrulae WSM1271 chromosome I (NC_014923)
αr14	gene	Mesci_5121	R	5266103	5266693	YP_004144271.1	TetR family transcription regulator	Mesorhizobium ciceri biovar biserrulae WSM1271 chromosome I (NC_014923)
αr14	gene	BOV_0890	R	894271	895671	YP_001258873.1	tRNA (uracil-5-)-methyltransferase	Brucella ovis ATCC 25840 chromosome I (NC_009505)
αr14	sRNA	Bor14CI2	R	895749	895867	-	sRNA	Brucella ovis ATCC 25840 chromosome I (NC_009505)
αr14	gene	BOV_0891	R	895931	896077	YP_001258874.1	DUF1127	Brucella ovis ATCC 25840 chromosome I (NC_009505)
αr14	gene	BCAN_A0908	R	865739	867139	YP_001592741.1	tRNA (uracil-5-)-methyltransferase	Brucella canis ATCC 23365 chromosome I (NC_010103)
αr14	sRNA	Bcr14CI2	R	867217	867335	-	sRNA	Brucella canis ATCC 23365 chromosome I (NC_010103)
αr14	gene	BCAN_A0909	R	867399	867545	YP_001592742.1	DUF1127	Brucella canis ATCC 23365 chromosome I (NC_010103)
αr14	gene	BSUIS_A0933	R	887235	888635	YP_001627570.1	tRNA (uracil-5-)-methyltransferase	Brucella suis ATCC 23445 chromosome I (NC_010169)
αr14	sRNA	Bs23445r14CI2	R	888713	888831	-	sRNA	Brucella suis ATCC 23445 chromosome I (NC_010169)
αr14	gene	BSUIS_A0934	R	888895	889041	YP_001627571.1	hypothetical protein	Brucella suis ATCC 23445 chromosome I (NC_010169)
αr14	gene	BMI_I892	R	871571	872971	YP_003106830.1	tRNA (uracil-5-)-methyltransferase	Brucella microti CCM 4915 chromosome 1 (NC_013119)
αr14	sRNA	Bmir14CI2	R	873049	873167	-	sRNA	Brucella microti CCM 4915 chromosome 1 (NC_013119)
αr14	gene	BMI_I893	R	873231	873377	YP_003106831.1	DUF1127	Brucella microti CCM 4915 chromosome 1 (NC_013119)
αr14	gene	BR0894	R	867369	868769	NP_697907.1	tRNA (uracil-5-)-methyltransferase	Brucella suis 1330 chromosome I (NC_004310)
αr14	sRNA	Bs1330r14CI2	R	868847	868965	-	sRNA	Brucella suis 1330 chromosome I (NC_004310)
αr14	gene	BR0895	R	869029	869175	NP_697908.1	DUF1127	Brucella suis 1330 chromosome I (NC_004310)
αr14	gene	mlr7359	D	6091731	6092324	NP_107697.1	transcription factor regulator	Mesorhizobium loti MAFF303099 chromosome (NC_002678)
αr14	sRNA	Mlr14C5	R	6092423	6092540	-	sRNA	Mesorhizobium loti MAFF303099 chromosome (NC_002678)
αr14	gene	mll7360	R	6092659	6093681	NP_107698.1	transcription factor regulator	Mesorhizobium loti MAFF303099 chromosome (NC_002678)
αr14	gene	BMEI1072	D	1116469	1116615	NP_539989.1	DUF1127	Brucella melitensis bv. 1 str. 16M chromosome (NC_003317)
αr14	sRNA	Bm16Mr14CI1	D	1116661	1116787	-	sRNA	Brucella melitensis bv. 1 str. 16M chromosome (NC_003317)
αr14	gene	BMEI1073	D	1116821	1118257	NP_539990.1	tRNA (uracil-5-)-methyltransferase	Brucella melitensis bv. 1 str. 16M chromosome (NC_003317)
αr14	gene	BAbS19_I08530	R	887399	888799	YP_001934848.1	tRNA (uracil-5-)-methyltransferase	Brucella abortus S19 chromosome 1 (NC_010742)
αr14	sRNA	BaS19r14CI2	R	888877	888995	-	sRNA	Brucella abortus S19 chromosome 1 (NC_010742)
αr14	gene	BAbS19_I08540	R	889041	889187	YP_001934849.1	DUF1127	Brucella abortus S19 chromosome 1 (NC_010742)
αr14	gene	BMEA_A0933	R	888865	890265	YP_002732640.1	tRNA (uracil-5-)-methyltransferase	Brucella melitensis ATCC 23457 chromosome I (NC_012441)
αr14	sRNA	Bm23457r14CI2	R	890343	890461	-	sRNA	Brucella melitensis ATCC 23457 chromosome I (NC_012441)
αr14	gene	BMEA_A0934	R	890507	890653	YP_002732641.1	DUF1127	Brucella melitensis ATCC 23457 chromosome I (NC_012441)
αr14	gene	BruAb1_0906	R	889098	890498	YP_221632.1	tRNA (uracil-5-)-methyltransferase	Brucella abortus bv. 1 str. 9-941 chromosome I (NC_006932)
αr14	sRNA	Ba19941r14CI2	R	890576	890694	-	sRNA	Brucella abortus bv. 1 str. 9-941 chromosome I (NC_006932)
αr14	gene	BruAb1_0907	R	890740	890886	YP_221633.1	DUF1127	Brucella abortus bv. 1 str. 9-941 chromosome I (NC_006932)
αr14	gene	BAB1_0913	R	885376	886776	YP_414338.1	tRNA (uracil-5-)-methyltransferase	Brucella melitensis biovar Abortus 2308 chromosome I (NC_007618)
αr14	sRNA	Bmar14CI2	R	886854	886972	-	sRNA	Brucella melitensis biovar Abortus 2308 chromosome I (NC_007618)
αr14	gene	BAB1_0914	R	887018	887164	YP_414339.1	oxidoreductase	Brucella melitensis biovar Abortus 2308 chromosome I (NC_007618)
αr14	gene	Meso_4235	R	134555	135097	YP_665858.1	hypothetical protein	Mesorhizobium sp. BNC1 plasmid 1 (NC_008242)
αr14	sRNA	MsBCNr14p1	R	135270	135386	-	sRNA	Mesorhizobium sp. BNC1 plasmid 1 (NC_008242)
αr14	gene	Meso_4236	R	135539	136099	YP_665859.1	hypothetical protein	Mesorhizobium sp. BNC1 plasmid 1 (NC_008242)
αr14	gene	mlr6541	D	5350228	5350686	NP_107027.1	phasin	Mesorhizobium loti MAFF303099 chromosome (NC_002678)
αr14	sRNA	Mlr14C4	D	5350767	5350882	-	sRNA	Mesorhizobium loti MAFF303099 chromosome (NC_002678)
αr14	gene	mlr6543	D	5351042	5351115	-	two component regulator	Mesorhizobium loti MAFF303099 chromosome (NC_002678)
αr14	gene	RL2059	R	2172416	2173849	YP_767657.1	tRNA (uracil-5-)-methyltransferase	Rhizobium leguminosarum bv. viciae 3841 (NC_008380)
αr14	sRNA	Rlvr14C2	R	2174956	2175074	-	sRNA	Rhizobium leguminosarum bv. viciae 3841 (NC_008380)
αr14	gene	RL2060	D	2175400	2176503	YP_767658.1	membrane protein	Rhizobium leguminosarum bv. viciae 3841 (NC_008380)
